= 1999–2000 Djurgårdens IF (men's hockey) season =

Swedish ice hockey team season 1999 – 2000

1999–2000 Djurgårdens IF
- Elitserien 1999/2000 champions
- League: 1st SHL
- 1999–2000 record: 23–12–15
- Goals for: 180
- Goals against: 127

Team information
- Coach: Hardy Nilsson, Mats Waltin
- Captain: Charles Berglund
- Arena: Globen
- Average attendance: 7,437 (2nd)

Team leaders
- Goals: (Sweden) Kristofer Ottosson (25)
- Assists: (Norway) Espen Knutsen (35)
- Points: (Norway) Espen Knutsen (53)
- Penalty minutes: (Sweden) Mikael Magnusson (73)
- Goals against average: (Sweden) Mikael Tellqvist (2.22)

The 1999–2000 Djurgårdens IF Hockey season was the season in which the Swedish Djurgården ice hockey team finished first in the league, one point ahead of Brynäs. Djurgården was going to play rival Färjestad in quarterfinals. After a tough 7-game series Djurgården won and got to play Luleå and won pretty easily with a score of 3–0. Then in the finals Djurgården played against Modo Hockey with the Sedin twins (Daniel Sedin and Henrik Sedin). Djurgården won 3–0 and became Swedish champions for the first time since 1991. It was also the season in which Djurgården's coach Hardy Nilsson created the new play called Torpedo hockey.

== Playoffs ==
1999–2000 Playoffs

Quarterfinals: 4–3 (Home: 2–1–1; Road: 1–1–1)
Round	Date	Opponent	Score	Goaltender	Venue	Attendance	Series	Recap
1	12/3 2000	Färjestad	2–3	Tellqvist	Globe Arena	7,699	0–1
2	14/3 2000	Färjestad	1–0	Tellqvist	Färjestads Ishall	4,679	1–1
3	16/3 2000	Färjestad	5–3	Tellqvist	Globe Arena	12,362	2–1
4	18/3 2000	Färjestad	1–3	Tellqvist	Färjestads Ishall	4,642	2–2
5	20/3 2000	Färjestad	2 – 3 OT	Tellqvist	Globe Arena	10,554	2–3
6	22/3 2000	Färjestad	4 – 3 OT	Tellqvist	Färjestads Ishall	4,682	3–3
7	24/3 2000	Färjestad	4–1	Tellqvist	Globe Arena	13,052	4–3

Semifinals: 3–0 (Home: 2–0–0; Road: 1–0–0)
Round	Date	Opponent	Score	Goaltender	Venue	Attendance	Series	Recap
8	26/3 2000	Luleå	6–0	Tellqvist	Globe Arena	8,589	1–0
9	28/3 2000	Luleå	5–1	Tellqvist	Delfinens ishall	5,675	2–0
10	30/3 2000	Luleå	2 – 1 OT	Tellqvist	Globe Arena	13,850	3–0

Finals: 3–0 (Home: 2–0–0; Road: 1–0–0)
Round	Date	Opponent	Score	Goaltender	Venue	Attendance	Series	Recap
11	7/4 2000	Modo	5–0	Tellqvist	Globe Arena	13,850	1–0
12	9/4 2000	Modo	3 – 2 OT	Tellqvist	Kempehallen	6, 050	2–0
13	11/4 2000	Modo	4–1	Tellqvist	Globe Arena	13,850	3–0

== Player statistics ==
=== Regular season ===
==== Skaters Top-10 ====
Note: GP = Games played; G = Goals; A = Assists; Pts = Points; +/- = Plus/Minus; PIM = Penalty Minutes;

Player	GP	G	A	Pts	+/–	PIM
(Norway) Espen Knutsen	48	18	35	53	+22	65
(Sweden) Kristofer Ottosson	47	25	15	40	+20	12
(Sweden) Mikael Johansson	49	17	22	39	+22	13
(Sweden) Mikael Håkanson	48	17	17	34	+19	26
(Sweden) Per Eklund	50	20	13	33	+10	38
(Sweden) Thomas Johansson	39	15	14	29	−2	20
(Sweden) Björn Nord	49	17	11	28	−6	62
(Sweden) Nichlas Falk	49	4	23	27	+6	18
(Sweden) Mathias Tjärnqvist	50	12	12	24	+8	20
(Sweden) Daniel Tjärnqvist	42	3	16	19	+15	8

=== Playoffs ===
==== Skaters Top-10 ====
Note: GP = Games played; G = Goals; A = Assists; Pts = Points; +/- = Plus/Minus; PIM = Penalty Minutes;

Player	GP	G	A	Pts	+/–	PIM
(Norway) Espen Knutsen	13	5	16	21	+12	2
(Sweden) Mikael Johansson	13	8	8	16	+11	0
(Sweden) Mikael Håkanson	13	3	8	11	+10	12
(Sweden) Kristofer Ottosson	13	7	2	9	+12	2
(Sweden) Nichlas Falk	13	2	5	7	+2	4
(Sweden) Björn Nord	13	4	2	6	+3	8
(Sweden) Mathias Tjärnqvist	13	3	2	5	0	16
(Sweden) Mikael Magnusson	13	3	2	5	0	34
(Sweden) Charles Berglund	13	1	4	5	0	8
(Sweden) Per Eklund	13	3	1	4	−2	6
