= Sall =

Sall can refer to:

- Sall, Denmark, a village and a church parish in the Danish region of Midtjylland
- Sall, Norfolk, England
- Sall (patronymic), the patronymic of the Lam Toro dynasty of Senegal in the 15th century
- Sall (river), a river of Baden-Württemberg, Germany
- SALL, the symbol for the sal-like proteins:
  - SALL1
  - SALL2
  - SALL3
  - SALL4
- In Assembly language, the "shift arithmetic left long" command

== People ==
- Andrew Sall (1624–1682), Irish Jesuit, later a convert to the Church of England
- Bob Sall (1908–1974), American racecar driver
- Agustín Millares Sall (1917–1989), Spanish poet
- John Sall (born 1948), American businessman and computer software developer
- Moustapha Sall (1967–2025), Mauritanian football manager and player
- Moustapha Bayal Sall (born 1985), Senegalese footballer

== See also ==
- Sal (disambiguation)
- Salle (disambiguation)
