= Salo =

Salo or Salò may refer to:

== Places ==
=== Finland ===
- Salo, Finland, a town in Western Finland
  - Salo sub-region, a subdivision of Finland Proper and one of the Sub-regions of Finland since 2009
- An old name of Saloinen, a former municipality in Ostrobothnia

=== Spain ===
- Salo, Spain, a singular population entity in Sant Mateu de Bages, Spain

=== Other places ===
- Salò, a town in Lombardy, Italy
  - Salò Republic, a puppet state of Nazi Germany
- Salo Township, Aitkin County, Minnesota, a township in Minnesota, U.S.
- Salo, the Latin name for the modern Jalón river in Spain
- Salo, Central African Republic, a village in Sangha-Mbaéré prefecture

=== Rivers ===
- Jalón (river), formerly known as Salo, a river in Spain.

== People ==
- Salo (surname)
- Salo (given name)
- Salo (footballer) (born 1998), Portuguese footballer

== Other ==
- Salo (food), salted unrendered pork fat, popular in Eastern Europe
- Salo (instrument), a Thai musical instrument
- Salò, or the 120 Days of Sodom, a 1975 film by Pier Paolo Pasolini
- Salo, a character in The Sirens of Titan by Kurt Vonnegut
