= Sal =

Sal, SAL, or S.A.L. may refer to:

== Personal name ==
- Sal (name), a list of people and fictional characters with the given name or nickname

== Places ==
- Sal, Cape Verde, an island and municipality
- Sal, Iran, a village in East Azerbaijan Province
- Cay Sal, a small island between Florida, Cuba and the Bahamas
- Sal Glacier, Queen Maud Land, Antarctica
- Sal River (India), Goa
- Sal (Russia), a tributary of the Don in southern Russia

== Arts and entertainment ==
- Sal (film), a 2011 film about Sal Mineo
- Laffing Sal, an automated character

== Science ==
- Sal (tree) (Shorea robusta), from the Indian subcontinent
- Saharan Air Layer, or SAL
- Salivary lipocalin, or SAL, the pig major urinary protein homologue
- Society of Antiquaries of London, a British historical and archaeological learned society
- Sterility assurance level, or SAL, in microbiology

== Transportation ==
- Seaboard Air Line Railroad, reporting mark SAL
- Shah Alam Line, a rapid transit line in Malaysia
- Sociedade de Aviação Ligeira, or SAL, Luanda, Angola, an air taxi operator
- Suid-Afrikaanse Lugdiens, or SAL, the Afrikaans name for South African Airways
- Swedish American Line, or SAL, a former passenger line
- Amílcar Cabral International Airport, also known as Sal International Airport, Cape Verde
- El Salvador International Airport, IATA code SAL

== Other uses ==
- Sal languages, a family of Tibeto-Burman languages
- Salam Zgharta FC, a Lebanese association football club
- Saskatchewan Accelerator Laboratory, or SAL
- Semi-active laser, a laser guidance technique mostly used in military applications
- Shropshire (Salop), England, Chapman code SAL, in genealogy
- Société anonyme libanaise, or SAL
- Sons of the American Legion, or SAL, a patriotic service organization
- South Atlantic League, or SAL, a minor US baseball league
- Structural Adjustment Loan, or SAL, to developing countries
- Surface Air Lift/Surface Air Lifted, or SAL, a postal classification
- Finnish Shooting Sport Federation (Finnish: Suomen Ampumaurheiluliitto, SAL)

== See also ==
- Sall (disambiguation)
- Salle (disambiguation)
- Sally (disambiguation)
- Salo (disambiguation)
