= Salle =

Salle is the French word for 'hall', 'room' or 'auditorium', as in:

- Salle des Concerts Herz, a former Paris concert hall
- Salle Favart, theatre of the Paris Opéra-Comique
- Salle Le Peletier, former home of the Paris Opéra
- Salle Pleyel, a Paris concert hall
- Salle Ventadour, a former Paris theatre
- Salle Wilfrid-Pelletier, a multipurpose venue in Montréal

It may also refer to:

Places:

- Salle, Norfolk, a village and civil parish in England, pronounced "Saul"
- Salle, Abruzzo, Italy
- Salle, Nepal

People:

- Abraham Salle (1670–1719), Huguenot ancestor, immigrant, and colonist
- Alexander Östlund, Swedish football player, nicknamed "Salle"
- Auguste Sallé French traveller and entomologist
- David Salle, American painter
- Fred Salle, English long jumper
- Jérôme Salle, French film director
- Johan Sälle, Swedish ice hockey player
- Mary Lou Sallee, American politician from Missouri

== See also ==
- La Salle (disambiguation) (including LaSalle)
- Sal (disambiguation)
- Sall (disambiguation)
