= Adam Larsson =

Swedish ice hockey player (born 1992)

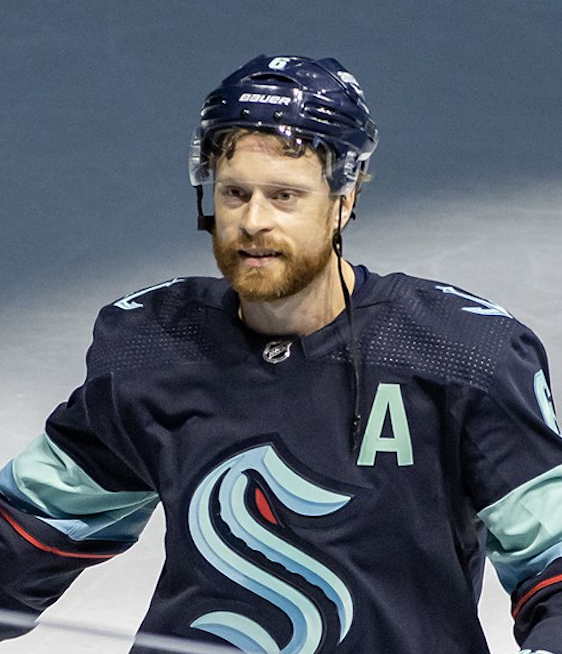
- Larsson with the Seattle Kraken in 2023
- Born: 12 November 1992 (age 34) Skellefteå, Sweden
- Height: 6 ft 3 in (191 cm)
- Weight: 215 lb (98 kg; 15 st 5 lb)
- Position: Defence
- Shoots: Right
- NHL team Former teams: Seattle Kraken; Skellefteå AIK; New Jersey Devils; Edmonton Oilers
- National team: Sweden
- NHL draft: 4th overall, 2011; New Jersey Devils
- Playing career: 2009–present

Nils Erik Adam Larsson (born 12 November 1992) is a Swedish professional ice hockey player who is a defenceman and alternate captain for the Seattle Kraken of the National Hockey League (NHL). He was selected fourth overall by the New Jersey Devils in the 2011 NHL entry draft. The youngest player on the Skellefteå AIK squad at the time of his draft, Larsson was the first defenceman and first European-trained player to be drafted in 2011.

Larsson spent five seasons with the Devils before being traded to the Edmonton Oilers in 2016. Before the start of the 2017–18 season, he became the first Swede in franchise history to be named an alternate captain for the Oilers. On 21 July 2021, Larsson joined the Seattle Kraken in the 2021 NHL expansion draft. While with the Kraken, Larsson has reached numerous milestones, including playing in his 1,000th NHL game in March 2026.

Internationally, Larsson has represented Sweden at the IIHF World Championship and World Junior Championship, winning a gold medal at the 2018 IIHF World Championship and being named to the tournament's All-Star team.

== Personal life ==
Larsson was born on 12 November 1992 in Skellefteå, Sweden, to ice hockey player Robert Larsson. His father played 249 games with Skellefteå AIK from 1985 to 1995. Despite being drafted in the sixth round, 112th overall, by the Los Angeles Kings during the 1988 NHL entry draft, he never played in North America. Larsson is the middle child between his older brother Hampus and younger sister Julia.

Larsson and his wife Vera have one child together.

== Playing career ==
=== Skellefteå AIK (2009–2011) ===
In the 2008–09 season, Larsson played with his older brother Hampus in the J20 SuperElit, Sweden's junior league. The 2009–10 Elitserien season turned out to be a breakthrough season for Larsson. He scored two goals in an Elitserien game against Timrå IK on 15 October 2009. By the end of the season, Larsson had tied Tomas Jonsson's record for points collected by Elitserien defencemen under age 18 with 17 points.

Larsson played a limited number of games during the 2010–11 season due to a groin injury and finished with only nine points. On 2 November 2010, Larsson fought Timrå IK forward Daniel Corso, receiving a cut eyebrow during the altercation. Larsson commented that he kept his gloves on because removing them during a fight in the Elitserien leads to an automatic one-game suspension. Although Larsson did not remove his gloves, both he and Corso were suspended for two games and received fines as a result of the fight. Larsson's play in the 2010–11 season earned him a nomination for the Elitserien Rookie of the Year award, which Mattias Ekholm would eventually win.

=== New Jersey Devils (2011–2016) ===
Leading up to the 2011 NHL entry draft, Larsson was considered a highly ranked prospect and was expected to be a first-round draft pick. He was rated by the NHL Central Scouting Bureau as the top European-based prospect available in the draft. Larsson was eventually selected in the first round, fourth overall, by the New Jersey Devils. He signed a three-year, entry-level contract with no bonuses at the NHL rookie maximum of US$925,000 per year with the Devils on 15 July 2011, due to general manager Lou Lamoriello's disapproval of performance bonuses. Larsson's agent J.P. Barry said this was unusual for a top-10 draft pick. The signing had to occur before 16 July or they would be forced to pay Skelleftea $100,000 to extend the deadline. After attending the Devils' July training camp, he flew home to Sweden for a few weeks before returning to New Jersey to start working out and skating at the Prudential Center.

Larsson made his NHL debut on 8 October 2011 against the Philadelphia Flyers. Upon making his debut, Larsson became the first 18-year-old defenceman to dress for the Devils since Petr Sykora in the 1995–96 season. He also became the sixth under-20 defenceman to play for the Devils, and the first 18-year-old defenceman in the NHL since 2008. Through his first few games in the NHL, Larsson often played alongside defencemen Andy Greene or Henrik Tallinder. Shortly after his 19th birthday, Larsson scored his first career NHL goal in a 3–1 loss to the Washington Capitals on 11 November. By mid-November, Larsson had accumulated six points while playing 22:49 per game as one of the Devils' top defencemen. At the same time, he also tied a team rookie defenceman record by collecting points in five straight games between November 19 and 26. While he was originally skating on the Devils power-play unit, Pete DeBoer removed him after too many mistakes so he could focus on his overall play. In spite of this, and missing two games to attend his grandmother's funeral, Larsson led all rookie defencemen with two goals and 11 assists for 13 points. Due to his play during the first three months of the season, Larsson was selected to the NHL All-Star Rookie SuperSkills Competition on 12 January 2012, along with teammate Adam Henrique. At the time of the selection, Larsson led all rookie defencemen with 13 assists and 15 points while averaging 21:46 of ice time per game. However, he chose to pull out due to a sore wrist and was replaced by Montreal Canadiens rookie defenceman Raphael Diaz.

Through his first 48 games in the NHL, Larsson averaged 21:48 minutes per game while tallying two goals and 14 assists. However, he missed 10 games to recover from a hit by Canadiens defenceman P.K. Subban on 2 February 2012. Although he missed numerous games to recover, Larsson returned to the Devils' lineup still leading all Devils defencemen in points. However, he only scored two assists through the final 16 games and he served as a healthy scratch for five of the team's last six regular season games. He finished the regular season with two goals and 16 assists through 65 games and received one fifth-place vote for the Calder Memorial Trophy. Beyond his point total, Larsson played an average of 26 seconds per game on the penalty kill, while averaging 1:38 on the power play. Despite his success during the regular season, Larsson struggled to enter the Devils' lineup in the 2012 Stanley Cup playoffs as he failed to make an appearance during their opening-round matchup against the Florida Panthers. He eventually made his postseason debut in Game 2 of the Eastern Conference semifinals against the Philadelphia Flyers after Ilya Kovalchuk suffered an injury. During his debut, he recorded five hits and tallied the game-tying goal in their eventual 4–1 win. Upon scoring the game-tying goal, Larsson also became the first Devils rookie defenceman to score a goal in his first playoff game. Due to his debut, Larsson remained in the Devils' lineup for Game 3 despite Kovalchuk returning. He played in four more playoff games, going pointless through all, before being replaced by Peter Harrold prior to Game 2 of the Eastern Conference finals against the New York Rangers.

Due to the 2012–13 NHL lockout, Larsson was assigned to the Devils' American Hockey League (AHL) affiliate, the Albany Devils, to start the season. He tallied four goals and 15 assists in 33 games with Albany before the 2012–13 NHL lockout ended. When the NHL resumed play for the shortened 2012–13 season, Larsson sat out as a healthy scratch for five games before making his season debut on 31 January 2013 in place of Mark Fayne. Upon rejoining the team, Larsson was again paired with Greene and saw increased time on the Devils' penalty kill. He finished with six assists through 37 games, while also averaging 18:06 of ice time per game.

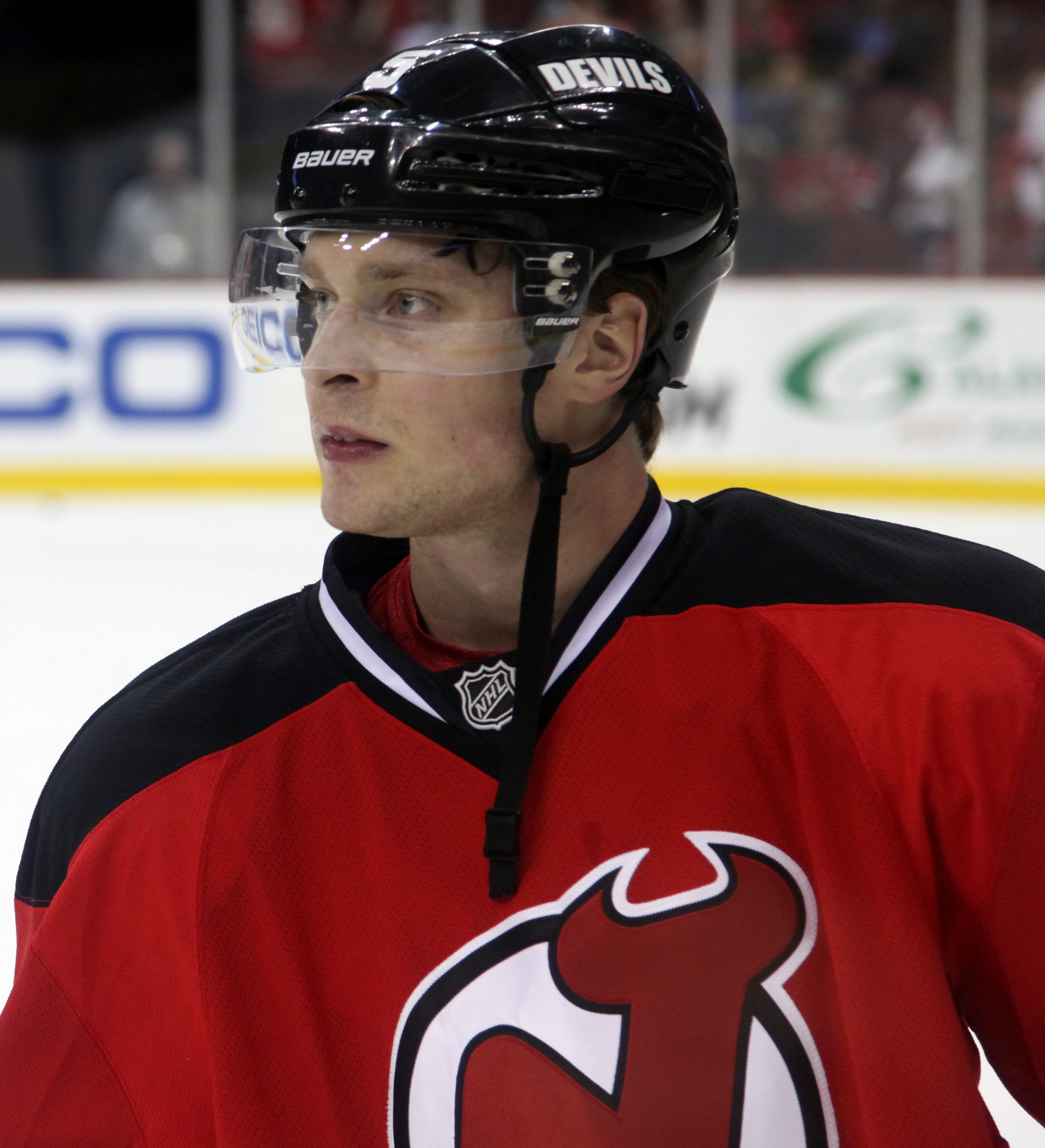
Larsson with the New Jersey Devils in April 2014.

Larsson made the Devils' opening night roster prior to the start of the 2013–14 season. After suffering a lower-body injury on 23 November 2013 during a game against the San Jose Sharks, Larsson was placed on injured reserve. At the time, he had one goal and two assists through his first 20 games of the season. He did not skate for the first few weeks but began skating lightly after three weeks of rest. However, he suffered a setback while rehabbing and his knee locked up again. This resulted in a longer recovery period than originally predicted. He returned to the ice after missing 21 games and was immediately reassigned to the AHL to work on his conditioning. He remained with the Albany Devils for 32 games before being recalled to the NHL level on 31 March. At the time of his recall, he led the team in scoring among defencemen with three goals and 16 assists for 19 points. He scored one goal and two assists through 26 games with the Devils, while the team failed to qualify for the Stanley Cup playoffs for the third consecutive season. He was then one of many players reassigned to the AHL to help the Albany Devils in their 2014 Calder Cup playoffs run.

Larsson made his 2014–15 season debut on 21 October but was a healthy scratch until 30 October. He later missed 10 games starting from 2 December while recovering from the mumps. Upon recovering, he was reassigned to the Albany Devils for a conditioning stint on 19 December. After tallying two assists in Albany, he returned to the NHL lineup on 23 December. Following the 2014–15 season, Larsson became a restricted free agent under the NHL Collective Bargaining Agreement (CBA). The Devils made him a qualifying offer to retain his NHL rights and on 5 July 2015, he filed for salary arbitration under the CBA. On 25 July, he signed a six-year, $25 million contract with an average annual value of $4,166,667 to remain with the Devils.

=== Edmonton Oilers (2016–2021) ===
On 29 June 2016, Larsson was traded to the Edmonton Oilers in exchange for Taylor Hall. The trade was immediately met with derision and shock from hockey pundits who felt that the trade was lopsided in favor of the Devils. Oilers President and General Manager Peter Chiarelli defended the trade, saying: "(Larsson) is a younger player, not by much, by a year. It’s a need-based trade. I feel very strongly about this player. I think he’s only scratched the surface." Through the preseason and exhibition games, Larsson played on the Oilers’ top pairing with fellow countryman Oscar Klefbom. This continued into the regular season, with the pair playing together throughout the campaign as they gained experience in their defensive roles. Although Larsson only tallied three points while averaging 20:19 of ice time through 16 games, coach Todd McLellan praised him for being a "stabilizing factor" on the blue line. By late December, Larsson and the Oilers were contending for first place in the Pacific Division with an 18–12–6 record. As a member of the Oilers' top defensive pairing, Larsson had tallied two goals and four assists through 36 games and was tied for eighth in the NHL in hits with 106. Due to an injury to defenceman Darnell Nurse, Larsson was praised as being the Oilers' most physical defenceman.

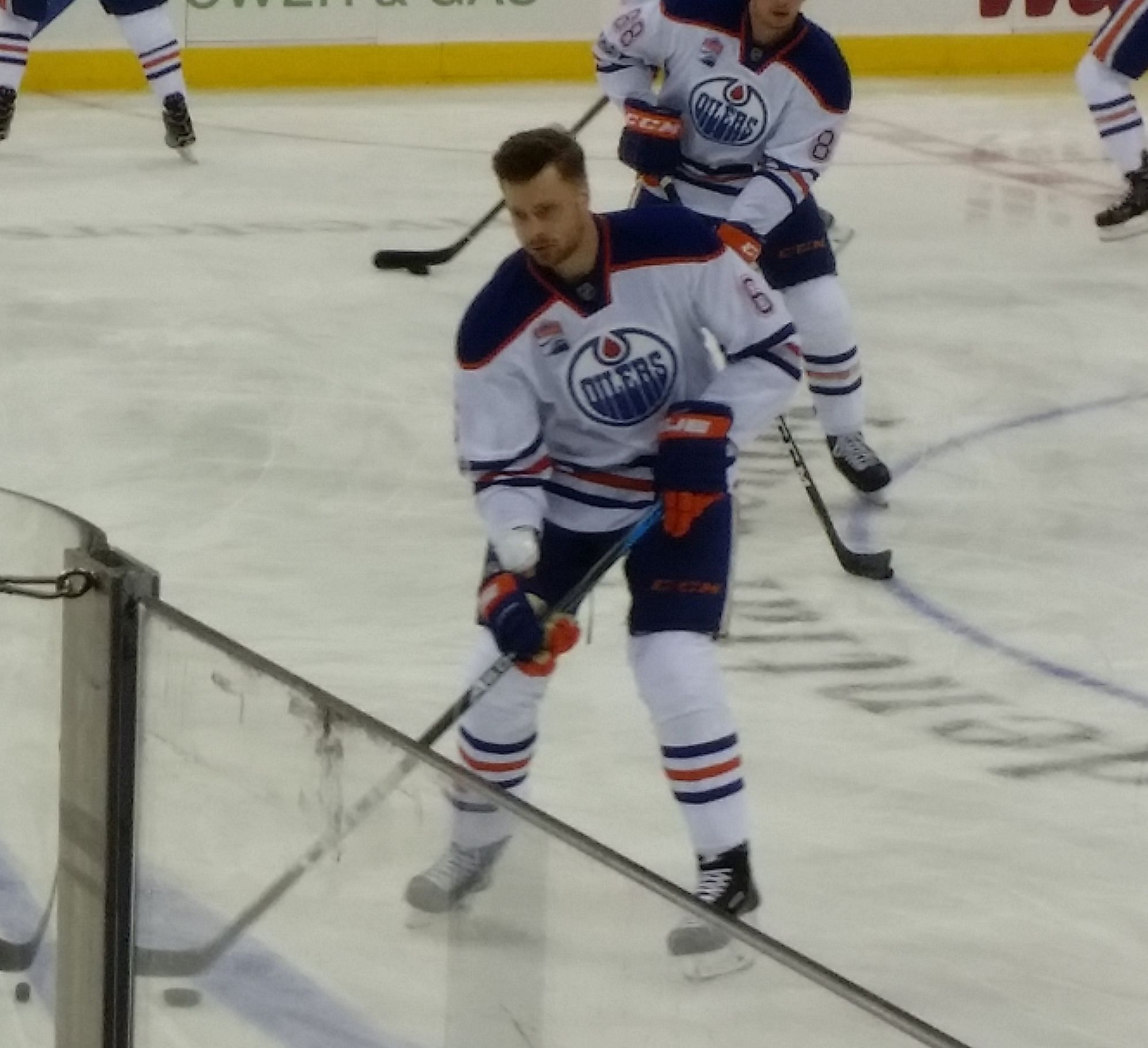
Larsson with the Oilers in January 2017.

Through the second half of the season, Larsson and Klefbom continued to be relied on as the Oilers' top defensive pairing. Despite missing numerous games to recover from an injury in February, Larsson finished the season with four goals and 15 assists for 19 points through 79 games. As the Oilers faced the San Jose Sharks in the 2017 Stanley Cup playoffs, Larsson and Klefbom were often charged with covering Sharks captain Joe Pavelski. They eventually beat the Sharks in six games and met the Anaheim Ducks in the Western Conference Second Round. Larsson played an important role in their second round, despite the team failing to qualify for the Western Conference Final. In Game 1 against the Ducks, Larsson scored two goals in 7½ minutes of the third period to lift the Oilers to a 5–3 win. During the Oilers 4–3 double-overtime loss in Game 5, Larrson logged a team-high 44:58 minutes of ice time as he was one of two Oilers defencemen who didn't miss a shift due to an injury examination. While the Oilers eventually fell to the Ducks in seven games, Larsson finished the postseason with two goals and four assists through 13 games.

Before the start of the 2017–18 season, Larsson became the first Swede in franchise history to be named an alternate captain for the Oilers. Due to injuries throughout the lineup, Larsson spent the 2017–18 season playing with Klefbom or Nurse on the Oilers' top defensive unit. Larsson began the season tallying three goals and one assist through his first 25 games, before being placed on injured reserve on 1 December. The Oilers posted a 4–4–0 record over Larsson's injury stint before he returned to the lineup on 18 December. Larsson missed more games during the season following his father's cardiac arrest on 25 January. He missed eight games directly following his father's death, played in seven when funeral arrangements were pending, and then missed another two to return to Sweden for the funeral. After returning to the Oilers lineup, Larsson tallied his 100th NHL point in a 3–2 win over the Los Angeles Kings on 24 March. He subsequently finished the season with four goals and 12 points through 57 games. As a result of his personal struggles during the 2017–18 season, Larsson was the Oilers nominee for the Bill Masterton Memorial Trophy as a player who most exemplifies "perseverance, sportsmanship and dedication to hockey."

Larsson returned to the Oilers for the 2018–19 preseason but suffered a back injury during an exhibition game against the Calgary Flames. He subsequently missed two exhibition games with back tightness but returned to the ice for the Oilers' season opener in Gothenburg, Sweden. Larsson started the season immediately reconnecting with Klefbom as the Oilers' top defensive pairing, before the latter suffered an injury in late December. As well, the Oilers losing record of 10-10–1 to begin the season resulted in head coach Todd McLellan being replaced with Ken Hitchcock. Following the injury to Klefbom, Nurse joined Larsson as the Oilers' top defensive pair. However, following the return of Kris Russell, Larsson gained rookie Caleb Jones as his new defensive partner. As Larsson struggled without Klefbom in the lineup, so did the team who were seventh in the Pacific Division with 52 points in mid-January. Although Larsson finished the season with 17 assists and 20 points through all 82 games, the Oilers failed to qualify for the 2019 Stanley Cup playoffs.

During the 2019 offseason, Larsson endured a different training regimen to become quicker on the ice and returned to the Oilers lineup down 10 pounds. After blocking a shot during the Oiler's 2019–20 season opener against the Vancouver Canucks, Larsson was placed on long-term injured reserve with a fractured right fibula. He returned to the Oilers lineup in November after missing 22 games to recover. Shortly after returning, Larsson played in his 500th NHL game on 22 November in a loss to the Los Angeles Kings. He also endured a lenghty scoring drought that was snapped on 15 February 2020 in a 4–1 win over the Florida Panthers. He reunited with Klefbom and the two played over 500 minutes of ice time together before the NHL was paused due to the COVID-19 pandemic. At the time of the pause in March, he had tallied one goal and five assists through 49 games.

=== Seattle Kraken (2021–present) ===
On 21 July 2021, Larsson was selected from the Oilers at the 2021 NHL expansion draft by the Seattle Kraken. He was immediately signed to a four-year, $16 million contract by the Kraken. It was later revealed that one of the reasons he had left the Oilers was due to the trauma of his father's death. He had been informed of his father's cardiac arrest while on the practice ice with the Oilers and, as such, found it "tough to come back." Prior to the start of the 2021–22 season, Larsson, Jordan Eberle, Yanni Gourde, and Jaden Schwartz were named the four alternative captains for the Kraken. He began the season strong, tallying 14 shots on goal in his first 10 games, while on a defensive pairing with Jérémy Lauzon. Larsson's play in high-risk situations subsequently earned him praise from Kraken coach Dave Hakstol, who described him as a measured professional who is a warrior for the team. He continued to be an asset for the Kraken on the penalty kill as he led the team with 52 minutes of ice time while shorthanded by early December. However, later that month, the Kraken were forced to postpone numerous games due to ongoing coronavirus concerns. Larson was one of numerous Kraken players added to the teams' COVID-19 protocol list within one week in mid-December.

Larsson (left) and Marcus Foligno battling for puck possession during a game in December 2023.

Larsson missed 10 days to recover from COVID-19 but immediately joined the team for their 3–2 loss against the Flyers on 29 December. Despite missing significant playing time and lacking a full practice, Larsson led all Seattle skaters with 22:38 of ice time. He continued to improve offensively through January as he scored in back-to-back games for the first time in his NHL career. He also scored the first overtime game-winning goal in franchise history on 27 January to lead the Kraken over the Pittsburgh Penguins. Once Giordano and Lauzon were dealt at the NHL trade deadline, Larsson and Vince Dunn became consistent defensive partners for the remainder of the season. He finished the season with a career-high 25 points through 81 games while also recording 183 hits, 140 blocked shots, 119 shots on net, and a minus-21 rating.

Before the start of the 2022–23 season, Larsson was again named one of four alternate captains for the Kraken alongside Eberle, Gourde, and Schwartz. He immediately reunited with Dunn as his defensive partner. Larsson played in his 700th career NHL game in a 1–0 loss to the Minnesota Wild on 11 November 2022. By December, Larsson had accumulated two goals and five assists while playing with Dunn. The following month, Larsson tied Eberle's record for the longest points streak in franchise history by scoring a goal and six assists through seven consecutive games. Larsson and Dunn continued to play together through the remainder of the season and into the 2023 Stanley Cup playoffs. Larsson finished the regular season with eight goals and 25 assists, while also continuing his iron man streak by playing in all 82 games.

Larsson's production dipped through the 2023–24 season, ending with four goals and 18 assists. He missed his first game as a Kraken on 5 April 2024 for the birth of his daughter. On 10 September 2024, Larsson signed a four-year contract extension with the Kraken, averaging $5.25 million per year. He recorded an assist in his 1000th career NHL game on 24 March 2026.

== International play ==
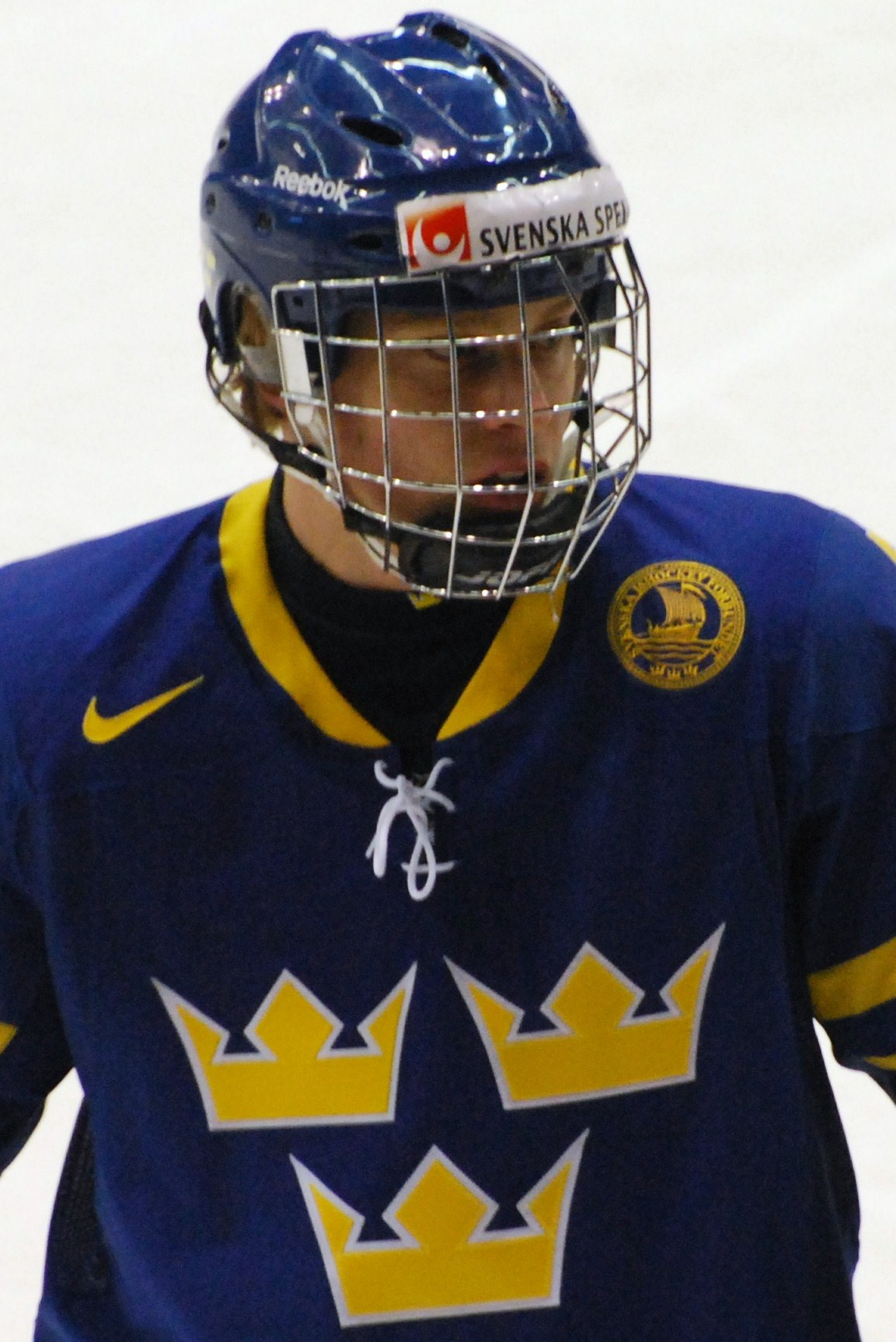
- Larsson playing for Sweden at the 2010 World Junior Ice Hockey Championships

Medal record

Representing Sweden

Men's ice hockey

World Championships
| Gold medal – first place | 2018 Denmark | |
| Bronze medal – third place | 2025 Sweden/Denmark | |

World Junior Championship
| Bronze medal – third place | 2010 Canada | |

IIHF World U18 Championship
| Silver medal – second place | 2010 Belarus | |

As a native of Sweden, Larsson has represented his home country at both the junior and senior levels on the international stage. He first represented Sweden at the 2009 IIHF World U18 Championships. The following year, he played alongside Tim Erixon and David Rundblad on Team Sweden at the 2010 World Junior Championships where he earned a bronze medal. At the 2010 World U18 Championships, Larsson recorded three points over five games and was selected as the best defenceman of the tournament. When Larsson played for Sweden at the 2011 World Junior Championships, he repeated his scoring of one goal and three assists from the previous tournament. This earned him the distinction of being Sweden's highest-scoring defenceman at the tournament.

Larsson made his Sweden senior team debut at the 2016 IIHF World Championship, where he scored one goal and three assists. He represented the Sweden senior team again at the 2018 IIHF World Championship, where he was named to the All-Star team after earning a gold medal. Larsson played for Team Sweden at the 2019 IIHF World Championship, although they failed to medal. Following a two-year break, Larsson was selected to represent Sweden at the 2022 IIHF World Championship, where he recorded one goal and one assist.

== Career statistics ==
=== Regular season and playoffs ===
| | | | Regular season | | | | | Playoffs |
| Season | Team | League | GP | G | A | Pts | PIM | GP | G | A | Pts | PIM |
|---|---|---|---|---|---|---|---|---|---|---|---|---|
| 2007–08 | Skellefteå AIK | J18 | 13 | 5 | 11 | 16 | 8 | — | — | — | — | — |
| 2007–08 | Skellefteå AIK | J18 Allsv | 11 | 0 | 4 | 4 | 22 | — | — | — | — | — |
| 2007–08 | Skellefteå AIK | J20 | 3 | 0 | 5 | 5 | 6 | — | — | — | — | — |
| 2008–09 | Skellefteå AIK | J18 | 5 | 2 | 3 | 5 | 2 | — | — | — | — | — |
| 2008–09 | Skellefteå AIK | J18 Allsv | 2 | 1 | 5 | 6 | 4 | 8 | 0 | 6 | 6 | 6 |
| 2008–09 | Skellefteå AIK | J20 | 26 | 2 | 7 | 9 | 28 | 5 | 0 | 4 | 4 | 2 |
| 2008–09 | Skellefteå AIK | SEL | 1 | 0 | 0 | 0 | 0 | — | — | — | — | — |
| 2009–10 | Skellefteå AIK | SEL | 49 | 4 | 13 | 17 | 18 | 11 | 0 | 1 | 1 | 31 |
| 2010–11 | Skellefteå AIK | SEL | 37 | 1 | 8 | 9 | 41 | 17 | 0 | 4 | 4 | 12 |
| 2011–12 | New Jersey Devils | NHL | 65 | 2 | 16 | 18 | 20 | 5 | 1 | 0 | 1 | 4 |
| 2012–13 | Albany Devils | AHL | 33 | 4 | 15 | 19 | 24 | — | — | — | — | — |
| 2012–13 | New Jersey Devils | NHL | 37 | 0 | 6 | 6 | 12 | — | — | — | — | — |
| 2013–14 | New Jersey Devils | NHL | 26 | 1 | 2 | 3 | 12 | — | — | — | — | — |
| 2013–14 | Albany Devils | AHL | 33 | 3 | 16 | 19 | 16 | 4 | 0 | 0 | 0 | 2 |
| 2014–15 | New Jersey Devils | NHL | 64 | 3 | 21 | 24 | 34 | — | — | — | — | — |
| 2014–15 | Albany Devils | AHL | 1 | 0 | 2 | 2 | 0 | — | — | — | — | — |
| 2015–16 | New Jersey Devils | NHL | 82 | 3 | 15 | 18 | 77 | — | — | — | — | — |
| 2016–17 | Edmonton Oilers | NHL | 79 | 4 | 15 | 19 | 55 | 13 | 2 | 4 | 6 | 4 |
| 2017–18 | Edmonton Oilers | NHL | 63 | 4 | 9 | 13 | 34 | — | — | — | — | — |
| 2018–19 | Edmonton Oilers | NHL | 82 | 3 | 17 | 20 | 44 | — | — | — | — | — |
| 2019–20 | Edmonton Oilers | NHL | 49 | 1 | 5 | 6 | 35 | 2 | 0 | 0 | 0 | 0 |
| 2020–21 | Edmonton Oilers | NHL | 56 | 4 | 6 | 10 | 24 | 4 | 0 | 2 | 2 | 2 |
| 2021–22 | Seattle Kraken | NHL | 82 | 8 | 17 | 25 | 55 | — | — | — | — | — |
| 2022–23 | Seattle Kraken | NHL | 82 | 8 | 25 | 33 | 47 | 14 | 2 | 2 | 4 | 8 |
| 2023–24 | Seattle Kraken | NHL | 81 | 4 | 14 | 18 | 55 | — | — | — | — | — |
| 2024–25 | Seattle Kraken | NHL | 82 | 7 | 21 | 28 | 31 | — | — | — | — | — |
| 2025–26 | Seattle Kraken | NHL | 82 | 7 | 18 | 25 | 42 | — | — | — | — | — |
| SEL totals | | | 87 | 5 | 21 | 26 | 59 | 28 | 0 | 5 | 5 | 43 |
| NHL totals | | | 1,012 | 59 | 207 | 266 | 577 | 38 | 5 | 8 | 13 | 18 |

=== International ===
| Year | Team | Event | Result | GP | G | A | Pts | PIM |
|---|---|---|---|---|---|---|---|---|
| 2009 | Sweden | U18 | 5th | 6 | 0 | 2 | 2 | 4 |
| 2010 | Sweden | WJC | 3rd place, bronze medalist(s) | 6 | 1 | 3 | 4 | 0 |
| 2010 | Sweden | U18 | 2nd place, silver medalist(s) | 5 | 2 | 1 | 3 | 12 |
| 2011 | Sweden | WJC | 4th | 6 | 1 | 3 | 4 | 4 |
| 2016 | Sweden | WC | 6th | 8 | 1 | 3 | 4 | 4 |
| 2018 | Sweden | WC | 1st place, gold medalist(s) | 10 | 1 | 2 | 3 | 10 |
| 2019 | Sweden | WC | 5th | 8 | 1 | 3 | 4 | 8 |
| 2022 | Sweden | WC | 6th | 8 | 1 | 1 | 2 | 6 |
| 2025 | Sweden | WC | 3rd place, bronze medalist(s) | 10 | 1 | 3 | 4 | 4 |
| Junior totals | | | | 23 | 4 | 9 | 13 | 20 |
| Senior totals | | | | 44 | 5 | 12 | 17 | 32 |

== Awards and honours ==
| Award | Year | Ref |
International
| World Championship All-Star Team | 2018 | |

Awards and achievements
| Preceded by Jacob Josefson | New Jersey Devils first-round draft pick 2011 | Succeeded by Stefan Matteau |
