= Darcy Loewen =

Canadian ice hockey player

- Born: February 26, 1969 (age 57) Calgary, Alberta, Canada
- Height: 5 ft 10 in (178 cm)
- Weight: 185 lb (84 kg; 13 st 3 lb)
- Position: Left wing
- Shot: Left
- Played for: Buffalo Sabres; Ottawa Senators
- NHL draft: 55th overall, 1988; Buffalo Sabres
- Playing career: 1989–2001

Darcy Loewen (born February 26, 1969) is a Canadian former professional ice hockey player. Loewen played 135 games in the National Hockey League with the Buffalo Sabres and Ottawa Senators between 1989 and 1994. He played in minor leagues in the United States and Europe for the remainder of his career, retiring in 2001. He became a minor ice hockey coach and firefighter in his post-playing life.

== Early life ==
Loewen was born on February 26, 1969 in Calgary, Alberta, Canada, to parents Gerry and Patricia Loewen. His family lived in Sylvan Lake, Alberta, where his father was a business owner. Loewen was born deaf in his left ear and had a spinal condition as a child. He played hockey growing and was named captain of the all-provincial team. His brother, Terry, also played hockey and made it to the major junior level before his career ended due to knee injuries.

== Career ==
=== Amateur ===
Loewen first gained attention of the Western Hockey League (WHL)'s Spokane Chiefs at 14 years old, and they placed him on their protected list. He made his WHL debut when he was 16 in the 1985–86 season, but his parents convinced him to finish his education before playing hockey full time. He appeared in eight games with the Chiefs, scoring two goals, one assist and three points. His first full season with the Chiefs in 1986–87 he played in 68 games, scoring 15 goals and 40 points. He was supposed to serve an automatic one-game suspension in December 1986 after receiving three game misconduct penalties during the season. However, Spokane played Loewen in the game he was supposed to be suspended for, automatically adding two games to the suspension. Loewen sat out the three games in January 1987 instead. His play during the season as a 17-year-old saw the newspapers referring to him as the "heart and soul" of the Chiefs' team. The Chiefs made the 1987 WHL playoffs but were swept in the first round by the Portland Winterhawks in five games. Loewen added one goal in the five games.

In his second season in the WHL in 1987–88, Loewen was named co-captain of the Chiefs by new head coach Butch Goring, leading the team for home games. He improved his scoring, marking 30 goals and 74 points in 72 games. He played in the WHL's 1988 All-Star Game alongside teammates Troy Gamble, Link Gaetz, and Todd Decker. The Chiefs made the 1988 WHL playoffs and advanced to the semi-finals, eventually losing to the Kamloops Blazers. In 15 playoff games, Loewen added seven goals and 12 points. He returned for a third season with Spokane in 1988–89, retaining the captaincy. In a game versus the Kamloops Blazers on November 11, 1988, Loewen cross-checked Ed Bertuzzi from behind, igniting a brawl that led to the referees ending the game prematurely as they and security attempted to get the two teams under control. For his role in the altercation, Loewen was suspended indefinitely until the league sorted the matter out, eventually being ordered to sit out three games. He was selected again to represent the Chiefs at the 1989 WHL All-Star Game. He finished the season with 31 goals and 58 points in 60 games.

=== Professional ===
==== Buffalo Sabres ====
Loewen was drafted by the Buffalo Sabres of the National Hockey League (NHL) in the third round, 55th overall, of the 1988 NHL entry draft. He signed an entry-level contract with Buffalo on March 17, 1989. After signing his contract, he was to play with Buffalo's American Hockey League (AHL) affiliate, the Rochester Americans, but Loewen broke his collarbone in his final junior game and missed the rest of the season. He signed a new contract in the 1989 offseason and was assigned to Rochester to start the 1989–90 season. He played in his first professional game against the Newmarket Saints on October 8, 1989. He appeared in 50 games for the Americans, scoring seven goals and 18 points. He was recalled by Buffalo alongside Bob Corkum, François Guay, and Darrin Shannon on March 17 and made his NHL debut on March 18 against the Winnipeg Jets. Both he and Guay were returned to Rochester on March 19. However, he was immediately recalled on March 21, and played in three more games for Buffalo that season, going scoreless. He was returned to Rochester to play in the 1990 Calder Cup playoffs, however he missed time after suffering a broken cheekbone. He played in five playoff games, scoring one goal. The Americans advanced to the Calder Cup final, but lost to the Springfield Indians in six games.

Loewen began the 1990–91 season with the Sabres playing on the fourth line alongside Mike Hartman and Rob Ray. As the Sabres struggled to open the season, he moved up the lineup, playing on a with Dale Hawerchuk and Rick Vaive. He played in five games, going scoreless, before being assigned to the AHL on October 24, 1990. He spent the majority of the season with Rochester, playing 71 games and registering 13 goals and 28 points. He was recalled one more time by Buffalo on November 13 after Dave Snuggerud became ill and played in one more game, going scoreless. The Americans made the 1991 Calder Cup playoffs and Loewen appeared in 15 playoff games, adding one goal and six points. Rochester advanced the Calder Cup final again, but were defeated by Springfield for the second year in a row.

The 1991–92 season was spent mostly in the AHL with Rochester. There, Loewen played in 73 games, scoring 11 goals and 31 points. He was recalled by Buffalo on March 1, 1992 after Colin Patterson suffered an injury. He made his NHL season debut that night against the Chicago Blackhawks. He played one more game for the Sabres, going scoreless, before being sent back to the AHL on March 11. The Americans made the 1992 Calder Cup playoffs, with Loewen playing in four games, registering one assist. However, he partially tore a ligament in his right knee on April 10 in Game 2 of their first round series against the Hershey Bears and was out for three weeks. He returned to play on May 12 in the semi-final against the Adirondack Red Wings. He played one more game before missing the final game due to back spasms as the Americans were eliminated by the Red Wings.

==== Ottawa Senators ====
In the 1992 offseason, the NHL expanded by two teams, the Ottawa Senators and the Tampa Bay Lightning. Loewen was among the players left unprotected by the Sabres in the 1992 NHL expansion draft. He was selected by Ottawa and signed a two-year, two-way contract with the team. Though he was invited to their training camp, he was not expected to make the team. However, after surprising the team with his play, he made the Senators and was a member of Ottawa's opening night roster on October 8, 1992. Loewen's hard work and intensity made him a fan favourite in Ottawa, becoming the team's "heart and soul" during its first season. He scored his first NHL goal on October 27 in a 7–2 loss to the Pittsburgh Penguins. He played in 79 games with the Senators during their inaugural season in 1992–93 recording four goals and nine points. However, the season was not without controversy. The general manager of the Senators, Mel Bridgman, who had negotiated his contract in the offseason, came to Loewen just before a clause in his contract activated that would convert his two-way contract to a one-way contract and demand he renegotiate or Bridgman would assign Loewen to the AHL for the rest of the season. Loewen, asked others such as family, other players, and his agent for advice, all of which told him to refuse to renegotiate. Loewen, fearing the loss of his dream of playing in the NHL, acquiesced and renegotiated the contract. Bridgman also approached Andrew McBain with the same terms, but McBain rebuffed his attempt. The story was leaked to the local newspaper, endearing Loewen even more to the fanbase and making both the team and Bridgman look bad. Bridgman was fired as general manager later that season.

His second season with the Senators in 1993–94 was injury-plagued. He started the season on a line with Dave McLlwain and Bill Huard. On October 18, 1993, Loewen signed a new, two-year contract with Ottawa. However, the injuries started to pile up beginning at the start of December. First he had a bruised foot, but still managed to get into games. Then, he suffered a bruised thigh/charley horse that kept him out for four games. Then, at the end of December, he suffered his worst injury, straining his knee ligaments, sidelining him until February 1994. He played in 44 games for the Senators that season, registering only three assists.

==== Minor leagues ====
In June 1994, Loewen was issued a termination contract by the Senators, which allowed him to become an unrestricted free agent for 30 days. At the end of 30 days, the Senators then could either buy out his remaining contract or retain his services for one more year. He did not sign with another team in that period and the Senators bought out his remaining contract. On August 5, it was announced that he had signed a one-year contract with the Las Vegas Thunder of the International Hockey League (IHL). In the 1994–95 season, Loewen appeared in 64 games, scoring 9 goals and 30 points. The Thunder made the 1995 Turner Cup playoffs, in which he played seven games, scoring one goal and two points.

He signed a three-year contract with the Thunder in July 1995 and put up a career-high 14 goals and 37 points in 72 games. The following season he tied his career-high in goals with 14, but only got 33 points in 76 games. In his third season he scored four goals and ten points in 42 games with Las Vegas before he was acquired by his old coach, Butch Goring, who was now the general manager of the Utah Grizzlies of the IHL. Loewen was traded for Tyler Prosofsky on January 19, 1998. He finished the season with the Grizzlies, playing in 34 games, scoring one goal and eight points. He spent the next season splitting time between the Idaho Steelheads of the West Coast Hockey League (WCHL) and the Nottingham Panthers of the British Ice Hockey Superleague (BISL). He signed with Idaho on November 16, 1998, becoming the first former NHL player to play for the Steelheads. He appeared in three games with Idaho, marking one goal and three points. He signed with Nottingham on November 26 and appeared in Nottingham's win over the Manchester Storm in the Benson & Hedges Cup. He played 28 games in the BISL, registering three goals and six points.

He returned to North America later that year and on May 6, re-signed with Idaho. He spent the 1999–00 season in the WCHL with Idaho, playing in 62 games, scoring nine goals and 25 points. He announced his retirement from hockey on June 2, 2000. However, the retirement was short-lived and Loewen returned in December for the 2000–01 season, scoring two goals and six points in 39 games. He retired for the final time in the 2001 offseason.

== International play ==
Loewen was chosen for Canada's junior team at the 1989 World Junior Championships. He scored his only goal of the tournament in a 7–4 victory over West Germany on December 28, 1988. Canada went on to place fourth in tournament and Loewen registered the one goal and two points in seven games. In March 1989, Loewen joined Canada's senior team for two exhibition games against Finland. He went scoreless in the two games.

== Personal life ==
After retiring from playing hockey, Loewen became an assistant coach in minor ice hockey in Alberta in 2001. He later became a firefighter with the North Las Vegas Fire Department.

== Career statistics ==
=== Regular season and playoffs ===
			Regular season					Playoffs
Season	Team	League	GP	G	A	Pts	PIM	GP	G	A	Pts	PIM
1985–86	Spokane Chiefs	WHL	8	2	1	3	19	—	—	—	—	—
1986–87	Spokane Chiefs	WHL	68	15	25	40	129	5	0	0	0	16
1987–88	Spokane Chiefs	WHL	72	30	44	74	231	15	7	5	12	54
1988–89	Spokane Chiefs	WHL	60	31	27	58	194	—	—	—	—	—
1988–89	Canadian National Team	Intl	2	0	0	0	0	—	—	—	—	—
1989–90	Buffalo Sabres	NHL	4	0	0	0	4	—	—	—	—	—
1989–90	Rochester Americans	AHL	50	7	11	18	193	5	1	0	1	6
1990–91	Buffalo Sabres	NHL	6	0	0	0	8	—	—	—	—	—
1990–91	Rochester Americans	AHL	71	13	15	28	130	15	1	5	6	14
1991–92	Buffalo Sabres	NHL	2	0	0	0	2	—	—	—	—	—
1991–92	Rochester Americans	AHL	73	11	20	31	193	4	0	1	1	8
1992–93	Ottawa Senators	NHL	79	4	5	9	145	—	—	—	—	—
1993–94	Ottawa Senators	NHL	44	0	3	3	52	—	—	—	—	—
1994–95	Las Vegas Thunder	IHL	64	9	21	30	183	7	1	1	2	16
1995–96	Las Vegas Thunder	IHL	72	14	23	37	198	—	—	—	—	—
1996–97	Las Vegas Thunder	IHL	76	14	19	33	177	3	0	0	0	0
1997–98	Las Vegas Thunder	IHL	42	4	6	10	117	—	—	—	—	—
1997–98	Utah Grizzlies	IHL	34	1	7	8	99	4	0	1	1	15
1998–99	Idaho Steelheads	WCHL	3	1	2	3	21	—	—	—	—	—
1998–99	Nottingham Panthers	BISL	28	3	3	6	37	8	0	3	3	31
1999–00	Idaho Steelheads	WCHL	62	9	16	25	62	3	0	0	0	0
2000–01	Idaho Steelheads	WCHL	39	2	4	6	32	9	0	1	1	6
NHL totals			135	4	8	12	211	—	—	—	—	—

=== International ===
Year	Team	Event	GP	G	A	Pts	PIM
1989	Canada	WJC	7	1	1	2	12
Junior totals			7	1	1	2	12

== Bibliography ==
- MacGregor, Roy (1993). Road Games: A Year in the Life of the NHL. Toronto: MacFarlane Walter & Ross. ISBN 0-921912-70-6.
- Podnieks, Andrew (1998). Red, White, and Gold: Canada at the World Junior Championships 1974–1999. Toronto: ECW Press. ISBN 1-55022-382-8.
