= 1988 NHL entry draft =

1988 North American ice hockey draft

General information
- Date: June 11, 1988
- Location: Montreal Forum; Montreal, Quebec, Canada

Overview
- 252 total selections in 12 rounds
- First selection: (United States) Mike Modano (Minnesota North Stars)
- Hall of Famers: 6: C Mike Modano; C Jeremy Roenick; RW Teemu Selanne; RW Mark Recchi; D Rob Blake; RW Alexander Mogilny

The 1988 NHL entry draft was the 26th draft for the National Hockey League. It was held at the Montreal Forum in Montreal.

The last active player in the NHL from this draft class was Teemu Selanne, who retired after the 2013–14 season.

== Selections by round ==
Below are listed the selections in the 1988 NHL entry draft. Club teams are located in North America unless otherwise noted.

=== Round one ===
= NHL All-Star team ·	= NHL All-Star (Note: Players are identified as an All-Star if they were selected for the All-Star game at any time in their career.) ·	= NHL All-Star and NHL All-Star team ·	= Hall of Famers

#	Player	Nationality	NHL team	College/junior/club team
1	Mike Modano (C)	United States	Minnesota North Stars	Prince Albert Raiders (WHL)
2	Trevor Linden (C/RW)	Canada	Vancouver Canucks	Medicine Hat Tigers (WHL)
3	Curtis Leschyshyn (D)	Canada	Quebec Nordiques	Saskatoon Blades (WHL)
4	Darrin Shannon (LW)	Canada	Pittsburgh Penguins	Windsor Spitfires (OHL)
5	Daniel Dore (RW)	Canada	Quebec Nordiques	Drummondville Voltigeurs (QMJHL)
6	Scott Pearson (LW)	Canada	Toronto Maple Leafs	Kingston Canadians (OHL)
7	Martin Gelinas (LW)	Canada	Los Angeles Kings	Hull Olympiques (QMJHL)
8	Jeremy Roenick (C)	United States	Chicago Blackhawks	Thayer Academy (USHS–MA)
9	Rod Brind'Amour (C/RW)	Canada	St. Louis Blues	Notre Dame Hounds (SJHL)
10	Teemu Selanne (RW)	Finland	Winnipeg Jets	Jokerit (Finland)
11	Chris Govedaris (LW)	Canada	Hartford Whalers	Toronto Marlboros (OHL)
12	Corey Foster (D)	Canada	New Jersey Devils	Peterborough Petes (OHL)
13	Joel Savage (RW)	Canada	Buffalo Sabres	Victoria Cougars (WHL)
14	Claude Boivin (LW)	Canada	Philadelphia Flyers	Drummondville Voltigeurs (QMJHL)
15	Reggie Savage (RW)	Canada	Washington Capitals	Victoriaville Tigres (QMJHL)
16	Kevin Cheveldayoff (D)	Canada	New York Islanders	Brandon Wheat Kings (WHL)
17	Kory Kocur (RW)	Canada	Detroit Red Wings	Saskatoon Blades (WHL)
18	Robert Cimetta (LW)	Canada	Boston Bruins	Toronto Marlboros (OHL)
19	Francois Leroux (D)	Canada	Edmonton Oilers	Saint-Jean Castors (QMJHL)
20	Eric Charron (D)	Canada	Montreal Canadiens	Trois-Rivieres Draveurs (QMJHL)
21	Jason Muzzatti (G)	Canada	Calgary Flames	Michigan State University (CCHA)
^{Reference:}

=== Round two ===
#	Player	Nationality	NHL team	College/junior/club team
22	Troy Mallette (LW)	Canada	New York Rangers (from Minnesota)^{1}	Sault Ste. Marie Greyhounds (OHL)
23	Jeff Christian (LW)	Canada	New Jersey Devils (from Vancouver)^{2}	London Knights (OHL)
24	Stephane Fiset (G)	Canada	Quebec Nordiques	Victoriaville Tigres (QMJHL)
25	Mark Major (LW)	Canada	Pittsburgh Penguins	North Bay Centennials (OHL)
26	Murray Duval (D)	Canada	New York Rangers	Spokane Chiefs (WHL)
27	Tie Domi (RW)	Canada	Toronto Maple Leafs	Peterborough Petes (OHL)
28	Paul Holden (D)	Canada	Los Angeles Kings	London Knights (OHL)
29	Wayne Doucet (LW)	Canada	New York Islanders (from Chicago)^{3}	Hamilton Steelhawks (OHL)
30	Adrien Plavsic (D)	Canada	St. Louis Blues	University of New Hampshire (Hockey East)
31	Russ Romaniuk (LW)	Canada	Winnipeg Jets	St. Boniface Saints (MJHL)
32	Barry Richter (D)	United States	Hartford Whalers	Culver Military Academy (USHS–IN)
33	Leif Rohlin (D)	Sweden	Vancouver Canucks (from New Jersey)^{4}	Vasteras HK (Sweden)
34	Martin St. Amour (LW)	Canada	Montreal Canadiens (from Buffalo)^{5}	Verdun Junior Canadiens (QMJHL)
35	Pat Murray (LW)	Canada	Philadelphia Flyers	Michigan State University (CCHA)
36	Tim Taylor (C)	Canada	Washington Capitals	London Knights (OHL)
37	Sean LeBrun (LW)	Canada	New York Islanders	New Westminster Bruins (WHL)
38	Serge Anglehart (D)	Canada	Detroit Red Wings	Drummondville Voltigeurs (QMJHL)
39	Petro Koivunen (RW)	Finland	Edmonton Oilers (from Boston)^{6}	Kiekko-Espoo (Finland)
40	Link Gaetz (D)	Canada	Minnesota North Stars (from Edmonton)^{7}	Spokane Chiefs (WHL)
41	Wade Bartley (D)	Canada	Washington Capitals (from Montreal via St. Louis)^{8}	Dauphin Kings (MJHL)
42	Todd Harkins (C)	United States	Calgary Flames	Miami University (CCHA)
^{Reference:}

1. Minnesota's second-round pick went to the Rangers as the result of a trade on November 13, 1986 that sent Bob Brooke and the Rangers fourth-round pick in 1988 Entry Draft to Minnesota in exchange for Curt Giles, Tony McKegney and this pick.
2. Vancouver's second-round pick went to New Jersey as the result of a trade on September 15, 1987 that sent Greg Adams and Kirk McLean to Vancouver in exchange for Patrik Sundstrom, Vancouver's fourth-round pick in the 1988 Entry Draft and New Jersey's option to swap second-round pick in the 1988 Entry Draft. New Jersey exercised the option and swap the 33rd overall pick for this pick.
3. Chicago's second-round pick went to the Islanders as the result of a trade on September 9, 1987 that sent Duane Sutter to Chicago in exchange for this pick.
4. New Jersey's second-round pick went to Vancouver as the result of a trade on September 15, 1987 that sent Patrik Sundstrom, Vancouver's fourth-round pick in the 1988 Entry Draft and New Jersey's option to swap second-round pick in the 1988 Entry Draft to New Jersey in exchange for Greg Adams and Kirk McLean to Vancouver. New Jersey exercised the option and swap the 23rd overall pick for this pick.
5. Buffalo's second-round pick went to Montreal as the result of a trade on November 18, 1986 that sent Tom Kurvers to Buffalo in exchange for this pick.
6. Boston's second-round pick went to Edmonton as the result of a trade on March 8, 1988 that sent Andy Moog to the Bruins in exchange for Geoff Courtnall, Bill Ranford and this pick.
7. Edmonton's pick went to Minnesota as the result of a trade on March 2, 1988 that sent Kent Nilsson to Edmonton in exchange for cash and this pick.
8. St. Louis' second-round pick went to Washington as the result of a trade on December 11, 1987 that sent Paul Cavallini to St. Louis in exchange for Washington's option of St. Louis' second-round pick in 1988 Entry Draft or 1989 entry draft. Washington selected in the 1988 Entry Draft.
  St. Louis previously acquired this pick as the result of a trade with Montreal on June 12, 1987 that sent that sent St. Louis' second-round pick in 1987 entry draft and fifth-round pick in 1988 Entry Draft to Montreal in exchange for Montreal's third-round pick in 1987 entry draft and this pick.

=== Round three ===
#	Player	Nationality	NHL team	College/junior/club team
43	Shaun Kane (D)	United States	Minnesota North Stars	Springfield Olympics (EJHL)
44	Dane Jackson (RW)	Canada	Vancouver Canucks	Vernon Vipers (BCJHL)
45	Petri Aaltonen (C)	Finland	Quebec Nordiques	HIFK (Finland)
46	Neil Carnes (C)	United States	Montreal Canadiens (from Pittsburgh)^{1}	Verdun Junior Canadiens (QMJHL)
47	Guy Dupuis (D)	Canada	Detroit Red Wings (from NY Rangers)^{2}	Hull Olympiques (QMJHL)
48	Peter Ing (G)	Canada	Toronto Maple Leafs	Windsor Spitfires (OHL)
49	John Van Kessel (RW)	Canada	Los Angeles Kings	North Bay Centennials (OHL)
50	Trevor Dam (RW)	Canada	Chicago Blackhawks	London Knights (OHL)
51	Rob Fournier (G)	Canada	St. Louis Blues	North Bay Centennials (OHL)
52	Stephane Beauregard (G)	Canada	Winnipeg Jets	Saint-Jean Castors (QMJHL)
53	Trevor Sim (RW)	Canada	Edmonton Oilers (from Hartford)^{3}	Seattle Thunderbirds (WHL)
54	Zdeno Ciger (LW)	Czechoslovakia	New Jersey Devils	ZTS Martin (Czechoslovakia)
55	Darcy Loewen (LW)	Canada	Buffalo Sabres	Spokane Chiefs (WHL)
56	Craig Fisher (LW)	Canada	Philadelphia Flyers	Oshawa Legionaires (MetJHL)
57	Duane Derksen (G)	Canada	Washington Capitals	Winkler Flyers (MJHL)
58	Danny Lorenz (G)	Canada	New York Islanders	Seattle Thunderbirds (WHL)
59	Petr Hrbek (RW)	Czechoslovakia	Detroit Red Wings	Sparta Prague (Czechoslovakia)
60	Steve Heinze (RW)	United States	Boston Bruins	Lawrence Academy (USHS–MA)
61	Collin Bauer (D)	Canada	Edmonton Oilers	Saskatoon Blades (WHL)
62	Daniel Gauthier (C)	Canada	Pittsburgh Penguins (from Montreal)^{4}	Victoriaville Tigres (QMJHL)
63	Dominic Roussel (G)	Canada	Philadelphia Flyers (from Calgary)^{5}	Trois-Rivieres Draveurs (QMJHL)

1. Pittsburgh's third-round pick went to Montreal as the result of a trade on December 17, 1987 that sent Perry Ganchar and future considerations to Pittsburgh in exchange for future considerations. The considerations became a third-round pick swap. Pittsburgh received the 62nd overall pick for this pick.
2. The Rangers' third-round pick went to Detroit as the result of a trade on July 29, 1986 that sent Kelly Kisio, Lane Lambert, Jim Leavins and Detroit's fifth-round pick in the 1988 Entry Draft to the Rangers in exchange for Glen Hanlon, the Rangers' third-round pick in the 1987 entry draft and this pick.
3. Hartford's third-round pick went to Edmonton as the result of a trade on December 12, 1986 that sent Dave Semenko to the Whalers in exchange for this pick.
4. Montreal's third-round pick went to Pittsburgh as the result of a trade on December 17, 1987 that sent future considerations to Montreal in exchange for Perry Ganchar and future considerations. The considerations became a third-round pick swap. Montreal received the 46th overall pick for this pick.
5. Calgary's third-round pick went to Philadelphia as the result of a trade on August 26, 1987 that sent Brad McCrimmon to Calgary in exchange for Calgary's first-round pick in the 1989 entry draft and this pick.

=== Round four ===
#	Player	Nationality	NHL team	College/junior/club team
64	Jeffrey Stolp (G)	United States	Minnesota North Stars (from Minnesota via the Rangers)^{1}	Greenway High School (USHS–MN)
65	Matt Ruchty (LW)	Canada	New Jersey Devils (from Vancouver)^{2}	Bowling Green State University (CCHA)
66	Darin Kimble (RW)	Canada	Quebec Nordiques	Prince Albert Raiders (WHL)
67	Mark Recchi (RW)	Canada	Pittsburgh Penguins	Kamloops Blazers (WHL)
68	Tony Amonte (RW)	United States	New York Rangers	Thayer Academy (USHS–MA)
69	Ted Crowley (D)	United States	Toronto Maple Leafs	Lawrence Academy (USHS–MA)
70	Rob Blake (D)	Canada	Los Angeles Kings	Bowling Green State University (CCHA)
71	Stefan Elvenes (RW)	Sweden	Chicago Blackhawks	Rogle BK (Sweden)
72	Jaan Luik (D)	Canada	St. Louis Blues (from NY Rangers)^{3}	Miami University (CCHA)
73	Brian Hunt (C)	Canada	Winnipeg Jets	Oshawa Generals (OHL)
74	Dean Dyer (C)	Canada	Hartford Whalers	Lake Superior State University (CCHA)
75	Scott Luik (RW)	Canada	New Jersey Devils	Miami University (CCHA)
76	Keith Carney (D)	United States	Buffalo Sabres	Mount Saint Charles Academy (USHS–RI)
77	Scott LaGrand (G)	United States	Philadelphia Flyers	Hotchkiss School (USHS–CT)
78	Rob Krauss (D)	Canada	Washington Capitals	Lethbridge Hurricanes (WHL)
79	Andre Brassard (D)	Canada	New York Islanders	Trois-Rivieres Draveurs (QMJHL)
80	Sheldon Kennedy (RW)	Canada	Detroit Red Wings	Swift Current Broncos (WHL)
81	Joe Juneau (C)	Canada	Boston Bruins	Rensselaer Polytechnic Institute (ECAC)
82	Cam Brauer (D)	Canada	Edmonton Oilers	Rennsselaer Polytehcnic Institute (ECAC)
83	Patric Kjellberg (LW)	Sweden	Montreal Canadiens	Falu IF (Sweden)
84	Gary Socha (C)	United States	Calgary Flames	Tabor Academy (USHS–MA)

1. The New York Rangers' fourth-round pick went to the Minnesota North Stars as the result of a trade on November 13, 1986 that sent Curt Giles, Tony McKegney and Minnesota's second-round pick in 1988 NHL Entry Draft to the Rangers in exchange for Bob Brooke and this pick.
  The Rangers previously acquired this pick as the result of a trade with the Minnesota North Stars on October 24, 1986 that sent that sent Mark Pavelich to Minnesota in exchange for this pick.
2. Vancouver's fourth-round pick went to New Jersey as the result of a trade on September 15, 1987 that sent Greg Adams and Kirk McLean to Vancouver in exchange for Patrik Sundstrom, New Jersey's option to swap second-round pick in the 1988 Entry Draft and this pick.
3. The St. Louis Blues' fourth-round pick went to the New York Rangers as the result of a trade on May 28, 1987 that sent Tony McKegney and Rob Whistle to the Blues in exchange for Bruce Bell and future considerations. Jim Pavese and this pick completed the trade on October 23, 1987.

=== Round five ===
#	Player	Nationality	NHL team	College/junior/club team
85	Tomas Forslund (RW)	Sweden	Calgary Flames (from Minnesota)^{1}	Leksands IF (Sweden)
86	Len Esau (D)	Canada	Toronto Maple Leafs (from Vancouver)^{2}	Humboldt Broncos (SJHL)
87	Stephene Venne (D)	Canada	Quebec Nordiques	University of Vermont (Hockey East)
88	Greg Andrusak (D)	Canada	Pittsburgh Penguins	University of Minnesota Duluth (WCHA)
89	Alexander Mogilny (RW)	Soviet Union	Buffalo Sabres (from NY Rangers)^{3}	CSKA Moscow (USSR)
90	Scott Matusovich (D)	United States	Calgary Flames (from Toronto)^{4}	Canterbury School (USHS–CT)
91	Jeff Robison (D)	United States	Los Angeles Kings	Mount St. Charles Academy (USHS–RI)
92	Joe Cleary (D)	United States	Chicago Blackhawks	Stratford Cullitons (MetJHL)
93	Peter Popovic (D)	Sweden	Montreal Canadiens (from St. Louis)^{5}	Vasteras HK (Sweden)
94	Tony Joseph (RW)	Canada	Winnipeg Jets	Oshawa Generals (OHL)
95	Scott Morrow (LW)	United States	Hartford Whalers	Northwood School (USHS–NY)
96	Chris Nelson (D)	United States	New Jersey Devils	Rochester Mustangs (USHL)
97	Rob Ray (RW)	Canada	Buffalo Sabres	Cornwall Royals (OHL)
98	Ed O'Brien (LW)	United States	Philadelphia Flyers	Cushing Academy (USHS–MA)
99	Martin Bergeron (C)	Canada	New York Rangers (from Washington)^{6}	Drummondville Voltigeurs (QMJHL)
100	Paul Rutherford (C)	Canada	New York Islanders	Ohio State University (CCHA)
101	Benoit LeBeau (LW)	Canada	Winnipeg Jets (from Detroit via NY Rangers)^{7}	Merrimack College (NCAA Independent)
102	Daniel Murphy (D)	United States	Boston Bruins	The Gunnery (USHS–CT)
103	Don Martin (LW)	Canada	Edmonton Oilers	London Knights (OHL)
104	Jean-Claude Bergeron (G)	Canada	Montreal Canadiens	Verdun Junior Canadiens (QMJHL)
105	Dave LaCouture (RW)	United States	St. Louis Blues (from Calgary)^{8}	Natick High School (USHS–MA)

1. Minnesota's fifth-round pick went to Calgary as a result of a trade on May 20, 1988 that sent the rights to Igor Liba to Minnesota in exchange for this pick.
2. Vancouver's fifth-round pick went to Toronto as a result of a trade on October 2, 1986 that sent Brad Maxwell to Vancouver in exchange for this pick.
3. The Rangers pick went to Buffalo as the result of a trade on December 31, 1987 that sent Paul Cyr and tenth-round pick in 1988 Entry Draft to the Rangers in exchange for Mike Donnelly and this pick.
4. Toronto's fifth-round pick went to Calgary as a result of a trade on September 17, 1987 that sent Dale Degray to Toronto in exchange for this pick.
5. St. Louis' fifth-round pick went to Montreal as the result of a trade on June 12, 1987 that sent Montreal's third-round pick in 1987 entry draft and second-round pick in 1988 Entry Draft in exchange for St. Louis' second-round pick in 1987 entry draft and this pick.
6. Washington's fifth-round pick went to the Rangers as the result of a trade on August 27, 1987 that sent Peter Sundstrom to Washington in exchange for this pick.
7. The Rangers' fifth-round pick went to the Winnipeg Jets as the result of a trade on June 8, 1987 that sent Brian Mullen and Winnipeg's tenth-round pick in 1987 entry draft to the Rangers in exchange for the Rangers' third-round pick in 1989 entry draft and this pick.
  The Rangers previously acquired this pick as the result of a trade with the Detroit Red Wings on July 29, 1986 that sent that sent Glen Hanlon, the Rangers' third-round picks in 1987 entry draft and in 1988 Entry Draft to Detroit in exchange for Kelly Kisio, Lane Lambert, Jim Leavins and this pick.
8. Calgary's fifth-round pick went to St. Louis as the result of a trade on June 13, 1987 that sent Ric Nattress to Calgary in exchange for a fourth-round pick in the 1987 entry draft and this pick.

=== Round six ===
#	Player	Nationality	NHL team	College/junior/club team
106	David DiVita (D)	United States	Buffalo Sabres (from Minnesota)^{1}	Lake Superior State University (CCHA)
107	Corrie D'Alessio (G)	Canada	Vancouver Canucks	Cornell University (ECAC)
108	Ed Ward (RW)	Canada	Quebec Nordiques	University of Michigan (CCHA)
109	Micah Aivazoff (RW)	Canada	Los Angeles Kings (from Pittsburgh)^{2}	Victoria Cougars (WHL)
110	Dennis Vial (D)	Canada	New York Rangers	Hamilton Steelhawks (OHL)
111	Pavel Gross (RW)	Czechoslovakia	New York Islanders (from Toronto)^{3}	Sparta Prague (Czechoslovakia)
112	Robert Larsson (D)	Sweden	Los Angeles Kings	Skelleftea AIK (Sweden)
113	Justin Lafayette (C)	Canada	Chicago Blackhawks	Ferris State University (CCHA)
114	Dan Fowler (D)	Canada	St. Louis Blues	University of Maine (Hockey East)
115	Ronald Jones (RW)	United States	Winnipeg Jets	Windsor Spitfires (OHL)
116	Corey Beaulieu (D)	Canada	Hartford Whalers	Seattle Thunderbirds (WHL)
117	Chad Johnson (C)	United States	New Jersey Devils	Rochester Mustangs (USHL)
118	Mike McLaughlin (LW)	United States	Buffalo Sabres	Choate Rosemary Hall (USHS–CT)
119	Gordie Frantti (D)	United States	Philadelphia Flyers	Calumet High School (USHS–MI)
120	Dmitri Khristich (RW/C)	Soviet Union	Washington Capitals	Sokil Kyiv (USSR)
121	Jason Rathbone (RW)	United States	New York Islanders	Brookline High School (USHS–MA)
122	Phil von Stefenelli (D)	Canada	Vancouver Canucks (from Detroit)^{4}	Boston University (Hockey East)
123	Derek Geary (RW)	United States	Boston Bruins	Gloucester High School (USHS–MA)
124	Len Barrie (C)	Canada	Edmonton Oilers	Victoria Cougars (WHL)
125	Patrik Carnback (RW)	Sweden	Montreal Canadiens	Vastra Frolunda HC (Sweden)
126	Jonas Bergqvist (RW)	Sweden	Calgary Flames	Leksands IF (Sweden)

1. Minnesota's sixth-round pick went to Buffalo as the result of a trade on October 13, 1987 that sent Andy Ristau to Minnesota in exchange for this pick.
2. Pittsburgh's sixth-round pick went to Los Angeles as the result of a trade on February 4, 1988 that sent Bryan Erickson to Pittsburgh in exchange for Chris Kontos and future considerations that became this pick.
3. Toronto's sixth-round pick went to the Islanders as the result of a trade on March 8, 1988 that sent Brian Curran to Toronto in exchange for this pick.
4. Detroit's sixth-round pick went to Vancouver as the result of a trade on November 21, 1986 that sent Doug Halward to Detroit in exchange for this pick.

=== Round seven ===
#	Player	Nationality	NHL team	College/junior/club team
127	Markus Akerblom (RW)	Sweden	Winnipeg Jets (from Minnesota)^{1}	IF Bjorkloven (Sweden)
128	Dixon Ward (RW)	Canada	Vancouver Canucks	Red Deer Rustlers (AJHL)
129	Valeri Kamensky (LW)	Soviet Union	Quebec Nordiques	CSKA Moscow (USSR)
130	Troy Mick (D)	Canada	Pittsburgh Penguins	Portland Winter Hawks (WHL)
131	Mike Rosati (G)	Canada	New York Rangers	Hamilton Steelhawks (OHL)
132	Matt Mallgrave (C)	United States	Toronto Maple Leafs	St. Paul's School (USHS–NH)
133	Jeff Kruesel (RW)	United States	Los Angeles Kings	John Marshall High School (USHS–MN)
134	Craig Woodcroft (C)	Canada	Chicago Blackhawks	Colgate University (ECAC)
135	Matt Hayes (D)	United States	St. Louis Blues	New Hampton School (USHS–NH)
136	Jukka Marttila (D)	Finland	Winnipeg Jets	Tappara (Finland)
137	Kerry Russell (C)	Canada	Hartford Whalers	Michigan State University (CCHA)
138	Chad Erickson (G)	United States	New Jersey Devils	Warroad High School (USHS–MN)
139	Mike Griffith (RW)	Canada	Buffalo Sabres	Ottawa 67's (OHL)
140	Jamie Cooke (RW)	Canada	Philadelphia Flyers	Bramalea Blues (MetJHL)
141	Keith Jones (RW)	Canada	Washington Capitals	Niagara Falls Canucks (NDJBHL)
142	Yves Gaucher (LW)	Canada	New York Islanders	Chicoutimi Sagueneens (QMJHL)
143	Kelly Hurd (RW)	Canada	Detroit Red Wings	Michigan Technological University (WCHA)
144	Brad Schlegel (D)	Canada	Washington Capitals (from Boston)^{2}	London Knights (WHL)
145	Mike Glover (RW)	Canada	Edmonton Oilers	Sault Ste. Marie Greyhounds (OHL)
146	Tim Chase (D)	United States	Montreal Canadiens	Tabor Academy (USHS–MA)
147	Stefan Nilsson (C)	Sweden	Calgary Flames	HV71 (Sweden)

Notes

1. Minnesota's seventh-round pick went to Winnipeg as the result of a trade on March 7, 1988 that sent the rights to John Blue to Minnesota in exchange for this pick.
2. Boston's seventh-round pick went to Washington as the result of a trade on June 1, 1987 that sent John Blum to Boston in exchange for this pick.

=== Round eight ===
#	Player	Nationality	NHL team	College/junior/club team
148	Ken MacArthur (D)	Canada	Minnesota North Stars	University of Denver (WCHA)
149	Greg Geldart (C)	Canada	Vancouver Canucks	St. Albert Saints (AJHL)
150	Sakari Lindfors (G)	Finland	Quebec Nordiques	HIFK (Finland)
151	Jeff Blaeser (LW)	United States	Pittsburgh Penguins	St. John's Preparatory School (USHS–MA)
152	Eric Couvrette (LW)	Canada	New York Rangers	Saint-Jean Castors (QMJHL)
153	Roger Elvenes (C)	Sweden	Toronto Maple Leafs	Rogle BK (Sweden)
154	Timo Peltomaa (RW)	Finland	Los Angeles Kings	Ilves (Finland)
155	Jon Pojar (LW)	United States	Chicago Blackhawks	Roseville High School (USHS–MN)
156	John McCoy (LW)	United States	St. Louis Blues	Edina High School (USHS–MN)
157	Mark Smith (LW)	United States	Winnipeg Jets	Trinity High School (USHS–OH)
158	Jim Burke (D)	United States	Hartford Whalers	University of Maine (Hockey East)
159	Brian LaFort (G)	United States	New Jersey Devils	Waltham High School (USHS–MA)
160	Dan Ruoho (LW)	United States	Buffalo Sabres	James Madison Memorial High School (USHS–WI)
161	Johann Salle (D)	Sweden	Philadelphia Flyers	Malmo IF (Sweden)
162	Todd Hilditch (D)	Canada	Washington Capitals	Penticton Knights (BCJHL)
163	Marty McInnis (LW)	United States	New York Islanders	Milton Academy (USHS–MA)
164	Brian McCormack (D)	United States	Detroit Red Wings	St. Paul's School (USHS–NH)
165	Mark Krys (D)	Canada	Boston Bruins	Boston University (Hockey East)
166	Shjon Podein (LW)	United States	Edmonton Oilers	University of Minnesota Duluth (WCHA)
167	Sean Hill (D)	United States	Montreal Canadiens	East High School (USHS–MN)
168	Troy Kennedy (LW)	Canada	Calgary Flames	Brandon Wheat Kings (WHL)

=== Round nine ===
#	Player	Nationality	NHL team	College/junior/club team
169	Travis Richards (D)	United States	Minnesota North Stars	Robbinsdale Armstrong High School (USHS–MN)
170	Roger Akerstrom (D)	Sweden	Vancouver Canucks	Lulea HF (Sweden)
171	Dan Wiebe (LW)	Canada	Quebec Nordiques	University of Alberta (CIAU)
172	Rob Gaudreau (RW)	United States	Pittsburgh Penguins	Bishop Hendricken High School (USHS–RI)
173	Patrick Forrest (D)	United States	New York Islanders	St. Cloud State University (NCAA Independent)
174	Mike DeLay (D)	United States	Toronto Maple Leafs	Canterbury School (USHS–CT)
175	Jim Larkin (LW)	United States	Los Angeles Kings	Mount Saint Joseph Academy (USHS–VT)
176	Matt Hentges (D)	United States	Chicago Blackhawks	Edina High School (USHS–MN)
177	Tony Twist (LW)	Canada	St. Louis Blues	Saskatoon Blades (WHL)
178	Mike Helber (C)	United States	Winnipeg Jets	Ann Arbor High School (USHS–MI)
179	Mark Hirth (C)	United States	Hartford Whalers	Michigan State University (CCHA)
180	Sergei Svetlov (RW)	Soviet Union	New Jersey Devils	Dynamo Moscow (USSR)
181	Wade Flaherty (G)	Canada	Buffalo Sabres	Victoria Cougars (WHL)
182	Brian Arthur (D)	Canada	Philadelphia Flyers	Etobicoke Capitals (CJBHL)
183	Petr Pavlas (D)	Czechoslovakia	Washington Capitals	Dukla Trencin (Czechoslovakia)
184	Jeff Blumer (RW)	United States	New York Islanders	St. Thomas College (MIAC)
185	Jody Praznik (D)	Canada	Detroit Red Wings	Colorado College (WCHA)
186	Jon Rohloff (D)	United States	Boston Bruins	Grand Rapids High School (USHS–MN)
187	Tom Cole (G)	United States	Edmonton Oilers	Woburn Memorial High School (USHS–MA)
188	Harijs Vitolinsh (C)	Soviet Union	Montreal Canadiens	Dinamo Riga (USSR)
189	Brett Peterson (D)	United States	Calgary Flames	St. Paul Vulcans (USHL)

=== Round ten ===
#	Player	Nationality	NHL team	College/junior/club team
190	Ari Matilainen (RW)	Finland	Minnesota North Stars	Assat (Finland)
191	Paul Constantin (LW)	Canada	Vancouver Canucks	Burlington Cougars (CJBHL)
192	Mark Sorensen (D)	Canada	Washington Capitals (from Quebec)^{1}	University of Michigan (CCHA)
193	Donald Pancoe (D)	Canada	Pittsburgh Penguins	Hamilton Steelhawks (OHL)
194	Paul Cain (C)	Canada	New York Rangers	Cornwall Royals (OHL)
195	David Sacco (C)	United States	Toronto Maple Leafs	Medford High School (USHS–MA)
196	Brad Hyatt (D)	Canada	Los Angeles Kings	Windsor Spitfires (OHL)
197	Daniel Maurice (C)	Canada	Chicago Blackhawks	Chicoutimi Sagueneens (QMJHL)
198	Bret Hedican (D)	United States	St. Louis Blues	North High School (USHS–MN)
199	Pavel Kostichkin (RW)	Soviet Union	Winnipeg Jets	CSKA Moscow (USSR)
200	Wayde Bucsis (LW)	Canada	Hartford Whalers	Prince Albert Raiders (WHL)
201	Bob Woods (D)	Canada	New Jersey Devils	Brandon Wheat Kings (WHL)
202	Eric Fenton (RW)	United States	New York Rangers (from Buffalo)^{2}	North Yarmouth Academy (USHS–ME)
203	Jeff Dandreta (RW)	United States	Philadelphia Flyers	Cushing Academy (USHS–MA)
204	Claudio Scremin (D)	Canada	Washington Capitals	University of Maine (Hockey East)
205	Jeff Kampersal (D)	United States	New York Islanders	St. John's Preparatory School (USHS–MA)
206	Glen Goodall (C)	Canada	Detroit Red Wings	Seattle Thunderbirds (WHL)
207	Alexander Semak (C)	Soviet Union	New Jersey Devils (from Boston)^{3}	Dynamo Moscow (USSR)
208	Vladimir Zubkov (D)	Soviet Union	Edmonton Oilers	CSKA Moscow (USSR)
209	Yuri Krivokhizha (D)	Soviet Union	Montreal Canadiens	Dinamo Minsk (USSR)
210	Guy Darveau (D)	Canada	Calgary Flames	Victoriaville Tigres (QMJHL)

1. Quebec's tenth-round pick went to Washington as the result of a trade on June 12, 1987 that sent Washington's ninth-round pick in the 1987 entry draft in exchange for Quebec's twelfth-round pick in the 1987 entry draft and this pick.
2. Buffalo's tenth-round pick went to the Rangers as the result of a trade on December 31, 1987 that sent Mike Donnelly and the 89th overall pick to the Sabres in exchange for Paul Cyr and this pick.
3. Boston's tenth-round pick went to New Jersey as the result of a trade on March 8, 1988 that sent Steve Tsujiura to Boston in exchange for this pick.

=== Round eleven ===
#	Player	Nationality	NHL team	College/junior/club team
211	Grant Bischoff (LW)	United States	Minnesota North Stars	University of Minnesota (WCHA)
212	Chris Wolanin (D)	United States	Vancouver Canucks	University of Illinois at Chicago (CCHA)
213	Alexei Gusarov (D)	Soviet Union	Quebec Nordiques	CSKA Moscow (USSR)
214	Cory Laylin (D)	United States	Pittsburgh Penguins	Apollo High School (USHS–MN)
215	Peter Fiorentino (D)	Canada	New York Rangers	Sault Ste. Marie Greyhounds (OHL)
216	Mike Gregorio (G)	United States	Toronto Maple Leafs	Cushing Academy (USHS–MA)
217	Doug Laprade (RW)	Canada	Los Angeles Kings	Lake Superior State University (NCAA)
218	Dirk Tenzer (D)	United States	Chicago Blackhawks	St. Paul's School (USHS–NH)
219	Heath DeBoer (D)	United States	St. Louis Blues	Spring Lake Park High School (USHS–MN)
220	Kevin Heise (LW)	Canada	Winnipeg Jets	Lethbridge Hurricanes (WHL)
221	Rob White (D)	Canada	Hartford Whalers	St. Lawrence University (ECAC)
222	Chuck Hughes (G)	United States	New Jersey Devils	Catholic Memorial High School (USHS–MA)
223	Tom Nieman (C)	United States	Buffalo Sabres	Choate Rosemary Hall (USHS–CT)
224	Scott Billey (RW)	United States	Philadelphia Flyers	Madison Capitols (USHL)
225	Chris Venkus (RW)	United States	Washington Capitals	Western Michigan University (CCHA)
226	Phil Neururer (D)	United States	New York Islanders	Osseo Senior High School (USHS–MN)
227	Darren Colbourne (RW)	Canada	Detroit Red Wings	Cornwall Royals (OHL)
228	Eric Reisman (D)	United States	Boston Bruins	Ohio State University (CCHA)
229	Darin MacDonald (LW)	Canada	Edmonton Oilers	Boston University (Hockey East)
230	Kevin Dahl (D)	Canada	Montreal Canadiens	Bowling Green State University (CCHA)
231	Dave Tretowicz (D)	United States	Calgary Flames	Clarkson University (ECAC)

=== Round twelve ===
#	Player	Nationality	NHL team	College/junior/club team
232	Trent Andison (LW)	United States	Minnesota North Stars	Cornell University (ECAC)
233	Stefan Nilsson (C)	Sweden	Vancouver Canucks	Troja (Sweden)
234	Claude Lapointe (C)	Canada	Quebec Nordiques	Laval Titan (QMJHL)
235	Darren Stolk (D)	Canada	Pittsburgh Penguins	Lethbridge Hurricanes (WHL)
236	Keith Slifstein (D)	United States	New York Rangers	Choate Rosemary Hall (USHS–CT)
237	Peter DeBoer (RW)	Canada	Toronto Maple Leafs	Windsor Spitfires (OHL)
238	Joe Flanagan (C)	United States	Los Angeles Kings	Canterbury School (USHS–CT)
239	Andreas Lupzig (C)	West Germany	Chicago Blackhawks	EV Landshut (West Germany)
240	Mike Francis (G)	United States	St. Louis Blues	Harvard University (ECAC)
241	Kyle Galloway (D)	Canada	Winnipeg Jets	University of Manitoba (CIAU)
242	Dan Slatalla (C)	United States	Hartford Whalers	Deerfield Academy (USHS–MA)
243	Michael Pohl (C)	West Germany	New Jersey Devils	Starbulls Rosenheim (West Germany)
244	Bobby Wallwork (LW)	United States	Buffalo Sabres	Miami University (CCHA)
245	Drahomir Kadlec (D)	Czechoslovakia	Philadelphia Flyers	Dukla Jihlava (Czechoslovakia)
246	Ron Pascucci (D)	United States	Washington Capitals	Belmont Hill School (USHS–MA)
247	Joe Capprini (G)	United States	New York Islanders	Babson College (NEWMAC)
248	Don Stone (C)	United States	Detroit Red Wings	University of Michigan (CCHA)
249	Doug Jones (D)	Canada	Boston Bruins	Kitchener Rangers (OHL)
250	Tim Tisdale (C)	Canada	Edmonton Oilers	Swift Current Broncos (WHL)
251	Dave Kunda (D)	Canada	Montreal Canadiens	University of Guelph (CIAU)
252	Sergei Pryakhin (RW)	Soviet Union	Calgary Flames	Krylya Sovetov (USSR)

== Draftees based on nationality ==
Rank	Country	Amount
	North America	213
1	Canada	129
2	United States	84
	Europe	39
3	Sweden	14
4	Soviet Union	11
5	Finland	7
6	Czechoslovakia	5
7	West Germany	2

== See also ==
- 1988 NHL supplemental draft
- 1988–89 NHL season
- List of NHL players
