= Roger Åkerström =

Swedish ice hockey player and coach

- Born: 5 April 1967 (age 59) Överkalix, Sweden
- Height: 6 ft 0 in (183 cm)
- Weight: 181 lb (82 kg; 12 st 13 lb)
- Position: Defenceman
- Shot: Left
- Played for: Luleå HF; VIK Västerås HK; HC Bolzano
- National team: Sweden
- NHL draft: 170th overall, 1988; Vancouver Canucks
- Playing career: 1985–2007

Roger Åkerström (born 5 April 1967) is a Swedish former professional ice hockey player, currently employed as an assistant coach with Luleå HF of the Swedish Hockey League (SHL, formerly named Elitserien).

== Playing career ==
Born in Överkalix, Norrbotten, Åkerström grew up in Luleå. He was drafted in the 1988 NHL entry draft in the ninth round as 170th overall by the Vancouver Canucks, but he never played a single National Hockey League (NHL) game. Åkerström played for Luleå HF in 19 of his professional seasons and won the Swedish Championship with the team in 1996, scoring the Championship-clinching goal.

Åkerström is perhaps best known for being a former record holder as the player with the most Elitserien games—regulation and playoff games included—with 911 games, 792 of these with Luleå HF. This record, however, was beaten on 22 September 2011 when Linköpings HC forward Mikael Håkanson played his 912th Elitserien game.

Apart from Luleå HF, Åkerström also played three seasons for Västerås IK in the same league. He also spent one season in Italy, with the Bolzano-Bozen Foxes of the Serie A league. Internationally, Åkerström participated at the 1993 and 1994 World Ice Hockey Championships as a member of Sweden's national team, winning silver and bronze medals. He retired from ice hockey as a player after the 2006–07 season, which he played with Luleå HF.
