= Duane-radial ray syndrome =

- Other names: Okihiro syndrome, DRRS
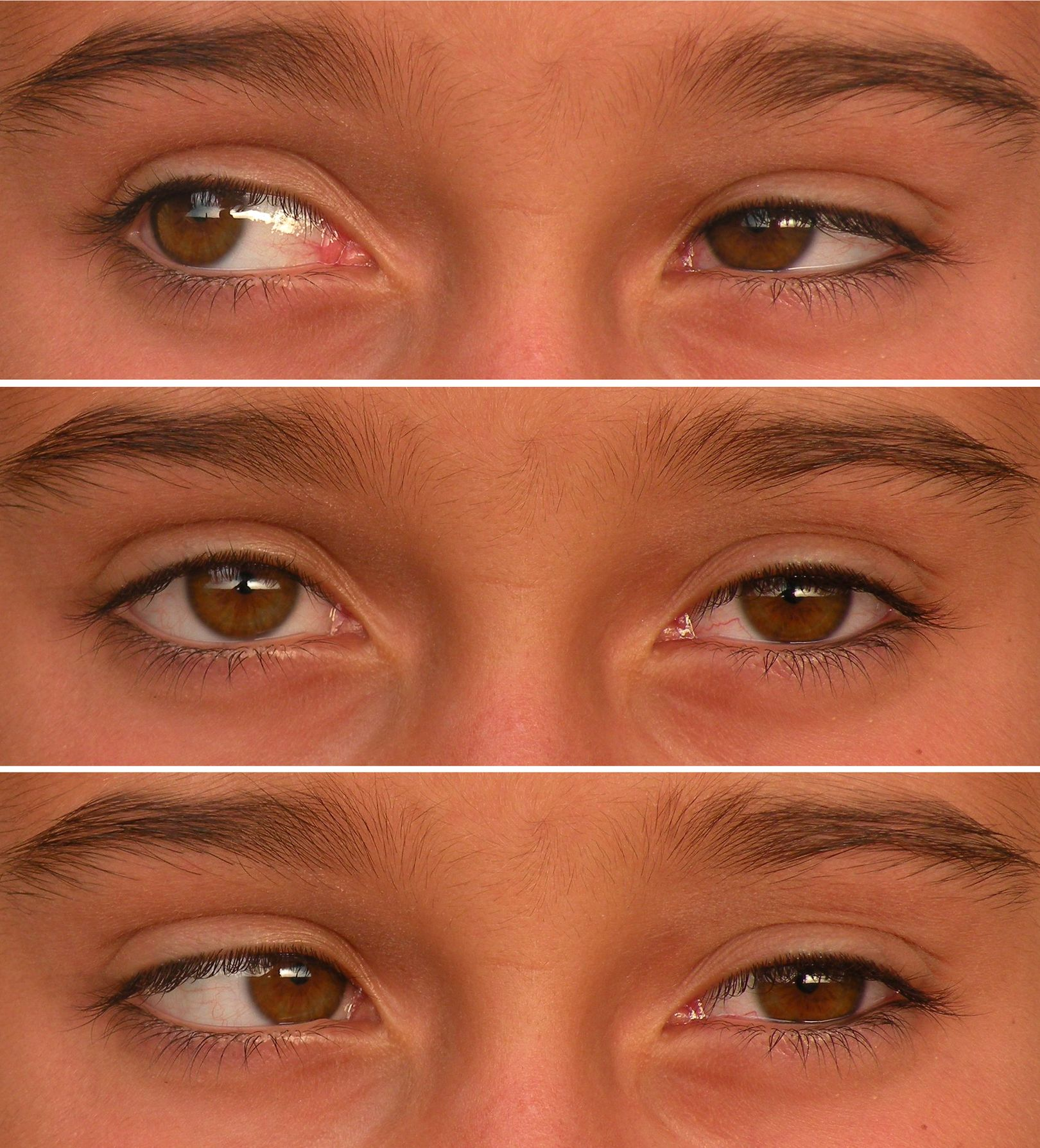
- Left Duane Type I
- Specialty: Medical genetics

Duane-radial ray syndrome, also known as Okihiro syndrome, is a rare autosomal dominant disorder that primarily affects the eyes (Duane anomaly) and causes abnormalities of bones in the arms and hands (radial ray malformations). This disorder is considered to be a SALL4-related disorder due to the SALL4 gene mutations leading to these abnormalities. It is diagnosed by clinical findings on a physical exam as well as genetic testing and imaging. After being diagnosed, there are other evaluations that one may go through in order to determine the extent of the disease. There are various treatments for the symptoms of this disorder.

== Symptoms ==
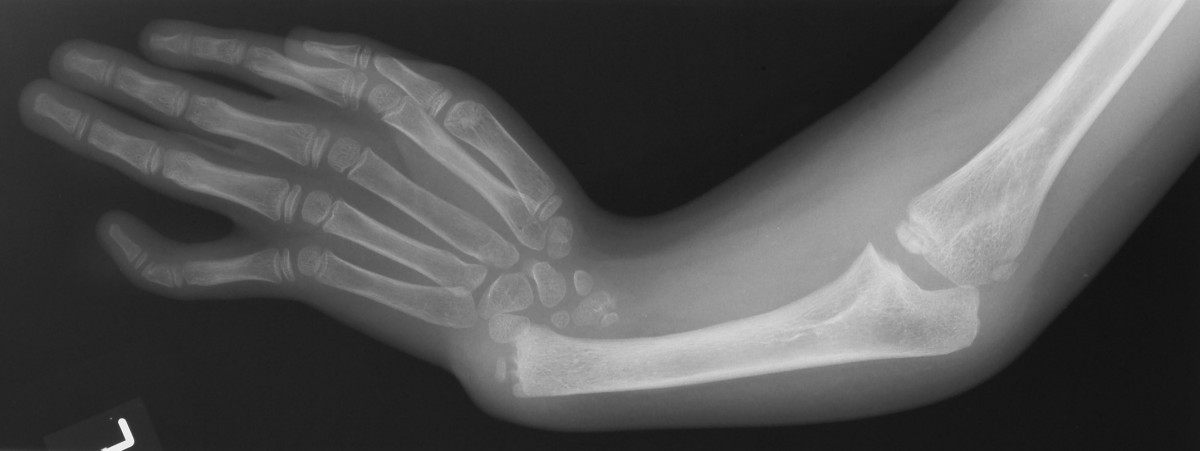
X-ray of arm showing absent radius and radially deviated hand, caused by thrombocytopenia and absent radius syndrome

Duane-radial ray syndrome has two major features that appear in the majority of cases. These two features are Duane anomaly and radial ray malformations. Each feature appears in 65% and 91% of cases respectively.

=== Duane anomaly ===
Also known as Duane syndrome, Duane anomaly is a congenital strabismus syndrome that is characterized by certain eye movements. This results from improper nerve development for eye movement.

The following are characteristics of Duane anomaly:

- Inability to fully abduct (away from the midline) the eye either unilaterally or bilaterally
- Narrowing of the palpebral fissure
- Retraction of the globe on adduction (toward the midline)
- Absence of the abducens nucleus and nerve (cranial nerve VI)
- Abnormal eye movement due to the lateral rectus muscle being innervated by a branch of the oculomotor nerve (cranial nerve III)

=== Radial ray malformations ===
This is characterized by hand and arm abnormalities. The following are specific characteristics:

- Malformed or absent (aplasia) thumb
- A thumb that looks more like a finger
- Partial or complete absence of a radius
- Shortening and radial deviation of the forearms
- Triphalangeal thumb
- Duplication of the thumb (preaxial polydactyly)

=== Other various symptoms ===
People with the combination of Duane anomaly and radial ray malformations may have a variety of other signs and symptoms. These features include:

- Unusually shaped ears
- Hearing loss
- Heart and kidney defects
- A distinctive facial appearance
- An inward- and downward-turning foot (a clubfoot)
- Fused vertebrae.

== Causes ==
=== Genetics ===
Duane-radial ray syndrome is caused by mutations in the SALL4 gene which is a part of a group of genes called the SALL family. This gene plays an important role in embryonic development by providing instructions to make proteins that are involved in the formation of tissues and organs. SALL proteins act as transcription factors in that they attach themselves to certain regions in DNA in order to help control certain gene activities. Due to the mutations in the SALL4 gene, proteins can not be made because one copy of the gene in each cell is stopped from performing its duty. These mutations are heterozygous and can be nonsense, short duplications, or deletions. At this time, there is no clear reason as to why a reduced amount of the SALL4 protein causes the symptoms of Duane-radial ray syndrome and similar conditions.

Duane-radial ray syndrome is inherited through autosomal dominance meaning that a mutation in one copy of the SALL 4 gene is all it takes to cause this syndrome. Those with this condition can have affected parents, but it can also manifest for the first time with no family history which is called de novo. Since Duane-radial ray syndrome is an autosomal dominant disorder, there is a 50% chance of passing the mutation on to offspring.

== Mechanism ==
The mechanism for this disorder is somewhat unclear. What is known is that Duane-radial ray syndrome begins with mutations in the SALL4 gene. Due to these mutations, the proteins involved in embryonic development for making tissues and organs are not functioning properly. These proteins then cause improper development of bones (e.g. absence of the radius), abnormal eye movements, and other miscellaneous symptoms.

== Diagnosis ==
The diagnosis for this syndrome is based on clinical findings on a physical exam and the presence of a heterozygous SALL4 pathogenic variant. During the physical exam, Duane-radial ray syndrome is clinically established by the following clinical findings:

- Duane anomaly
  - Limitation of abduction of the eye
  - Retraction of the globe
  - Narrowing of the palpebral fissure during adduction
- Radial ray malformations
  - Malformed, absent, or extra thumb
  - A thumb that looks more like a finger
  - Duplication of the thumb (preaxial polydactyly)
  - Deformity of the arm due to a lack of the radius
- Any of the symptoms above that can observed
  - Hearing loss
  - Clubfoot
  - Unusually shaped ears

=== Related conditions ===
The varied signs and symptoms of Duane-radial ray syndrome often overlap with features of other disorders.

- For example, acro-renal-ocular syndrome is characterized by Duane anomaly and other eye abnormalities, radial ray malformations, and kidney defects. Both conditions can be caused by mutations in the same gene. Based on these similarities, researchers are investigating whether Duane-radial ray syndrome and acro-renal-ocular syndrome are separate disorders or part of a single syndrome with many possible signs and symptoms.
- The features of Duane-radial ray syndrome also overlap with those of a condition called Holt–Oram syndrome; however, these two disorders are caused by mutations in different genes.

=== Evaluations after initial diagnosis ===
Evaluations by certain specialists should be performed following the initial diagnosis of Duane-radial ray syndrome. These evaluations will be used to determine the extent of the disease as well as the needs of the individual.

- Eyes - Complete eye exam by an optometrist or ophthalmologist especially focusing on the extraocular movements of the eye and the structural eye defects
- Heart - evaluation by a cardiologist along with an echocardiogram and ECG
- Kidneys - Laboratory tests to check kidney function and a renal ultrasound
- Hearing
- Endocrine - evaluation for growth hormone deficit if growth retardation present
- Blood - CBC to check for thrombocytopenia and leukocytosis
- Clinical genetics consultation

=== Testing ===
Since Duane-radial ray syndrome is a genetic disorder, a genetic test would be performed. One test that can be used is the SALL4 sequence analysis that is used to detect if SALL4 is present. If there is no pathogenic variant observed, a deletion/duplication analysis can be ordered following the SALL4 sequence analysis. As an alternative, another genetic test called a multi-gene panel can be ordered to detect SALL4 and any other genes of interest. The methods used for this panel vary depending on the laboratory.

=== Imaging ===
MRI imaging can be used to detect whether the abducens nerve is present.

== Treatment ==
Typically, treatment for this condition requires a team of specialists and surgery. Below are the treatments based on the symptom.

=== Duane anomaly ===
- Surgery for correction of severe strabismus

=== Radial ray malformations ===
- Surgery for correction of severe malformations of the forearms
- Construction of a functional thumb via surgery if aplasia of the thumb is present

=== Heart defects ===
- If a congenital heart defect is present, cardiac surgery may be necessary
- If a severe heart block is present, a pacemaker may have to be implanted
- Antiarrhythmic medications and surgery as necessitated by a cardiologist

=== Hearing deficits ===
- Hearing aids

=== Growth retardation ===
- Growth hormone therapy

== Recent research ==
There is currently recruitment for a clinical trial at Boston's Children Hospital.
