= Robert Larsson =

Swedish ice hockey player (1967–2018)

- Born: 20 February 1967 Skellefteå, Sweden
- Died: 1 February 2018 (aged 50) Edmonton, Alberta, Canada
- Height: 6 ft 2 in (188 cm)
- Weight: 203 lb (92 kg; 14 st 7 lb)
- Position: Defence
- Shot: Left
- Played for: Skellefteå AIK
- NHL draft: 112th overall, 1988; Los Angeles Kings
- Playing career: 1985–1995

Robert Larsson (20 February 1967 – 1 February 2018) was a Swedish professional ice hockey player who played 249 games with Skellefteå AIK from 1985 to 1995. Larsson was selected by the Los Angeles Kings in the 6th round (112th overall) of the 1988 NHL entry draft, but he never played in North America.

Larsson died on 1 February 2018. He was the father of Seattle Kraken defenceman Adam Larsson.

== Career statistics ==
			Regular season					Playoffs
Season	Team	League	GP	G	A	Pts	PIM	GP	G	A	Pts	PIM
1985–86	Skellefteå HC J20	Juniorserien	—	—	—	—	—	—	—	—	—	—
1985–86	Skellefteå HC	Division 1	18	5	2	7	8	—	—	—	—	—
1986–87	Skellefteå HC J20	Juniorserien	—	—	—	—	—	—	—	—	—	—
1986–87	Skellefteå HC	Elitserien	5	0	0	0	2	—	—	—	—	—
1987–88	Skellefteå HC	Elitserien	17	2	2	4	16	—	—	—	—	—
1987–88	Skellefteå HC	Allsvenskan D1	18	4	5	9	31	—	—	—	—	—
1988–89	Skellefteå HC	Elitserien	35	8	6	14	32	—	—	—	—	—
1989–90	Skellefteå HC	Elitserien	22	7	6	13	12	—	—	—	—	—
1989–90	Skellefteå HC	Allsvenskan D1	17	6	7	13	20	3	1	0	1	8
1990–91	Skellefteå HC	Division 1	24	4	8	12	18	—	—	—	—	—
1991–92	Skellefteå HC	Division 1	29	9	13	22	16	3	0	0	0	2
1992–93	Skellefteå HC	Division 1	30	14	13	27	22	5	2	1	3	6
1993–94	Skellefteå HC	Division 1	27	7	14	21	22	8	1	0	1	12
1994–95	Skellefteå HC	Division 1	7	0	2	2	6	—	—	—	—	—
Elitserien totals			79	17	14	31	62	—	—	—	—	—
Division 1 totals			135	39	52	91	92	16	3	1	4	20
