= Per Eklund (ice hockey) =

Swedish ice hockey player (born 1970)

- Born: July 9, 1970 (age 54); Sollentuna, Sweden
- Height: 1.80 m (5 ft 11 in)
- Weight: 88 kg (194 lb; 13 st 12 lb)
- Position: Right Wing
- Shot: Right
- Played for: SEL; Djurgårdens IF; Linköpings HC; AHL; Adirondack Red Wings; DEL; Krefeld Pinguine; Straubing Tigers
- NHL draft: 182nd overall, 1995; Detroit Red Wings
- Playing career: 1994–2007

Per Eklund (born July 9, 1970) is a Swedish former professional ice hockey player.

Eklund began playing hockey in Sollentuna HC but moved to Väsby IK to play in a higher level.

He played one game in Allsvenskan, where Väsby had been relegated to from Elitserien, during the 1987–88 season. After a few years unsuccessful attempts to reach Elitserien, Eklund moved to Huddinge IK in the same division after the 1991–92 season. The team managed to reach the last promotion playoff two seasons in a row, however did not manage to go all the way to Elitserien.

He made his Elitserien debut in Djurgårdens IF during the 1994–95 season. Eklund managed to score 19 goals and 29 point and was awarded Rookie of the Year. His achievements in Elitserien drew attention from NHL, and he was drafted by Detroit Red Wings in 1995, 182nd overall. He played the following two seasons in Djurgården before moving to Detroit's AHL franchise Adirondack Red Wings in 1997. The team made it to the Calder Cup but lost all three games in the first round against Albany River Rats.

Eklund returned to Djurgården after just one season in North America. He became Swedish champion with Djurgården in 2000, before moving abroad again, this time to the German team Krefeld Pinguine. He was not able to help the team to make the playoffs, and he moved back to Sweden and Linköpings HC the following season. After a total of five seasons in Linköping he moved back for a final Elitserien season in Djurgården. His last professional team was German Straubing Tigers which he played for during the 2006–07 season. He started playing hockey at a lower level in his first club, Sollentuna. After the 2008–09 season, he ended his playing career and became general manager for the senior team.

Per Eklund
Medal record

Men's ice hockey

World Championships
Silver medal – second place	1997	Team

Elitserien
Gold medal – first place	2000	Team

== Career statistics ==
=== Regular season and playoffs ===
			Regular season					Playoffs
Season	Team	League	GP	G	A	Pts	PIM	GP	G	A	Pts	PIM
1987–88	Väsby IK	SWE.2	1	0	0	0	0	—	—	—	—	—
1988–89	Väsby IK	SWE.2	17	3	8	11	8	7	4	1	5	2
1989–90	Väsby IK	SWE.2	32	12	21	33	40	2	0	1	1	2
1990–91	Väsby IK	SWE.2	30	18	13	31	24	4	0	0	0	0
1991–92	Väsby IK	SWE.2	29	13	24	37	26	—	—	—	—	—
1992–93	Huddinge IK	SWE.2	36	23	22	45	14	9	3	1	4	2
1993–94	Huddinge IK	SWE.2	35	20	11	31	40	2	0	0	0	2
1994–95	Djurgårdens IF	SEL	40	19	10	29	20	3	1	1	2	4
1995–96	Djurgårdens IF	SEL	39	17	10	27	10	1	0	0	0	0
1996–97	Djurgårdens IF	SEL	50	20	16	36	12	4	1	0	1	4
1997–98	Adirondack Red Wings	AHL	73	21	29	50	12	3	0	0	0	0
1998–99	Djurgårdens IF	SEL	48	14	9	23	49	4	0	0	0	0
1999–2000	Djurgårdens IF	SEL	50	20	13	33	38	13	3	1	4	6
2000–01	Krefeld Pinguine	DEL	60	14	12	26	8	—	—	—	—	—
2001–02	Linköpings HC	SEL	50	16	18	34	16	—	—	—	—	—
2002–03	Linköpings HC	SEL	50	7	27	34	56	—	—	—	—	—
2003–04	Linköpings HC	SEL	50	15	17	32	24	5	1	3	4	0
2004–05	Linköpings HC	SEL	49	6	9	15	18	6	0	0	0	2
2005–06	Djurgårdens IF	SEL	50	17	8	25	24	—	—	—	—	—
2006–07	Straubing Tigers	DEL	20	4	2	6	18	—	—	—	—	—
2006–07	Sollentuna HC	SWE.4	10	6	11	17	14	—	—	—	—	—
2007–08	Sollentuna HC	SWE.4	23	11	22	33	28	—	—	—	—	—
2008–09	Sollentuna HC	SWE.4	11	3	13	16	8	—	—	—	—	—
SWE.2 totals			175	88	101	189	152	24	7	3	10	8
SEL totals			476	151	137	288	267	36	6	5	11	12

=== International ===
Year	Team	Event	GP	G	A	Pts	PIM
1988	Sweden	EJC	5	5	1	6	0
1997	Sweden	WC	11	3	3	6	0
Senior totals			11	3	3	6	0
