= Johan Sälle =

Swedish ice hockey player

- Born: February 21, 1967 (age 59) Örebro, Sweden
- Height: 6 ft 2 in (188 cm)
- Weight: 203 lb (92 kg; 14 st 7 lb)
- Position: Defense
- Shot: Left
- Played for: Örebro IK; Malmö Redhawks; IK Pantern; EC Ratingen
- NHL draft: 161st overall, 1988; Philadelphia Flyers
- Playing career: 1984–2003

Johan Sälle (born February 21, 1967) is a Swedish former professional ice hockey player who primarily played in the Swedish Hockey League and Hockeyettan. Sälle was drafted in the eighth round of the 1988 NHL entry draft by the Philadelphia Flyers, but he never played professionally in North America. He spent most of his professional career in Sweden, playing eight seasons with the Malmö Redhawks.

== Career statistics ==
			Regular season					Playoffs
Season	Team	League	GP	G	A	Pts	PIM	GP	G	A	Pts	PIM
1983–84	Örebro IK	Division 1	1	0	0	0	0	—	—	—	—	—
1984–85	Örebro IK	Division 1	4	1	2	3	2	—	—	—	—	—
1985–86	Örebro IK	Division 1	5	0	0	0	0	—	—	—	—	—
1986–87	Örebro IK	Division 1	19	1	5	6	20	—	—	—	—	—
1987–88	Örebro IK	Division 1	36	9	4	13	48	—	—	—	—	—
1988–89	Malmö IF	Division 1	32	10	19	29	60	—	—	—	—	—
1989–90	Malmö IF	Division 1	32	11	16	27	103	—	—	—	—	—
1990–91	Malmö IF	SHL	38	4	5	9	34	2	0	0	0	12
1991–92	Malmö IF	SHL	29	2	5	7	62	10	2	0	2	12
1992–93	Malmö IF	SHL	30	3	2	5	38	6	0	0	0	8
1993–94	Malmö IF	SHL	24	3	2	5	26	11	1	0	1	12
1993–94	IK Pantern	Division 1	4	2	0	2	12	—	—	—	—	—
1994–95	Malmö IF	SHL	38	2	3	5	12	9	0	0	0	8
1995–96	Malmö IF	SHL	33	1	2	3	26	5	0	0	0	0
1996–97	EC Ratingen	DEL	11	2	3	5	4	—	—	—	—	—
1997–98	EC Bad Tölz	Germany2	46	19	19	38	42	—	—	—	—	—
1998–99	EC Bad Tölz	Germany2	58	8	23	31	46	—	—	—	—	—
1999–00	EC Bad Tölz	Germany2	39	2	9	11	18	—	—	—	—	—
2000–01	Hvidovre IK	Denmark2	18	13	16	29	29	—	—	—	—	—
2001–02	Hvidovre IK	Denmark	39	9	11	20	46	—	—	—	—	—
2002–03	Hvidovre IK	Denmark	25	6	7	13	28	—	—	—	—	—
2002–03	Rødovre Mighty Bulls	Denmark	4	0	2	2	12	5	1	1	2	2
SHL totals			192	15	19	34	198	43	3	0	3	52
