= Salo, Central African Republic =

Salo
- Location in Central African Republic
- Coordinates: 3°11′7″N 16°7′1″E
- Country: Central African Republic
- Prefecture: Sangha-Mbaéré
- Sub-prefecture: Nola
- Commune: Salo

Population (2021)
  - Total: 4,896

Salo is a village situated in Sangha-Mbaéré prefecture, Central African Republic.

== History ==
Seleka captured Salo in March 2013, and the Christians fled to the bush. In January 2014, Seleka withdrew from the village, and Anti-balaka seized it. Due to the presence of Anti-balaka, the Muslim residents fled to Cameroon while the Christians remained in the bush, although they occasionally visited Salo.

The villagers waged an uprising against Anti-balaka in November 2014, and they fled from the town. As of 2015, Salo was under the control of the government forces.

== Economy ==
Salo is heavily dependent on the logging, diamond, and gold mining sector. Coffee was a primary source of income for the residents before it stopped operating in 1967.

== Education ==
There are two schools in Salo.

== Infrastructure ==
The village has an oil port with depots that have capacity of 3500 m3. The depots were abandoned in 2000 and reoperated in 2008 after rehabilitation. However, Seleka looted and destroyed the oil depots on 7 May 2013. Nevertheless, the government planned to rehabilitate the oil depot in 2020, together with the Nola-Salo road, which was in poor condition.

== Healthcare ==
Salo has one health center.

== Bibliographies ==
- Première Urgence (April 2016). RCA RRM : Evaluation Multisectorielle à Salo (Sangha Mbaere), Rapport Préliminaire (PU/ 05.04.2016) (Report).
