= Hardy Nilsson =

Swedish ice hockey player and coach

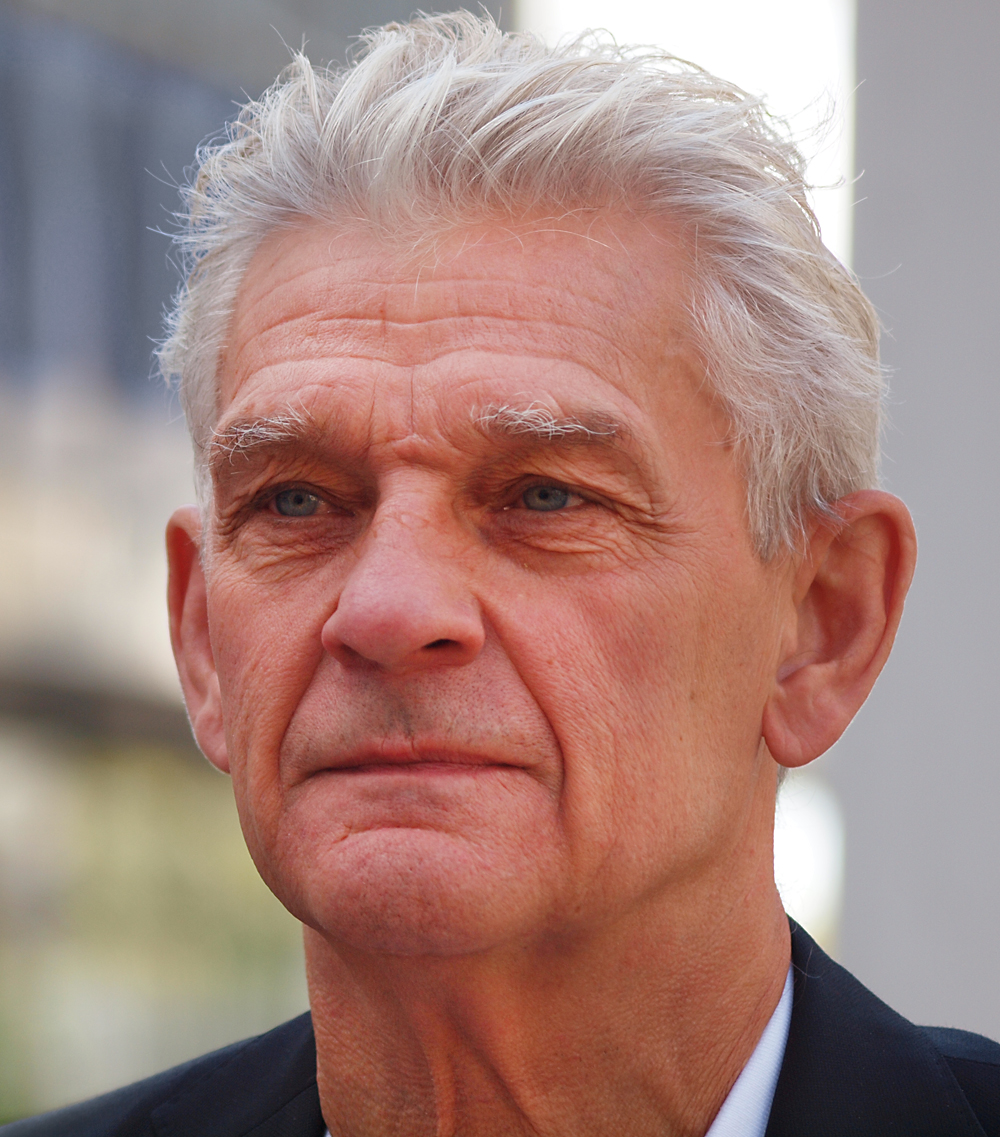
- Hardy Nilsson in September 2010
- Born: 23 June 1947 (age 78) Skellefteå, Sweden
- Height: 5 ft 11 in (180 cm)
- Weight: 189 lb (86 kg; 13 st 7 lb)
- Position: Forward
- Played for: Skellefteå AIK; Kölner Haie; Örebro IK
- Playing career: 1965–1982

Hardy Nilsson (born 23 June 1947) is a Swedish retired ice hockey player and coach. During his playing career he mainly played for Skellefteå AIK where he won the Swedish championships in 1978. In 1978 Nilsson moved to the German team Kölner Haie where he was very successful, scoring 21 goals and 102 points in 45 games. He ended his playing career in Örebro IK.

== Coaching career ==
Nilsson started his coaching career in 1982 in Bofors IK before moving on to Modo Hockey which he coached for two seasons. He moved on to his former team Kölner Haie for the 1985-86 season winning three German championships in a row 1986–88. He coached the team to third place in the 1989 European cup and runners-up in the bundesliga in 1991 before leaving Kölner in 1992. Nilsson stayed in Germany to coach EC Hedos München. He led the team to become German champions during the 1993–94 season. Nilsson began his international coaching career when he coached Team Switzerland for one season. He coached another German team, Düsseldorfer EG which he led to win the German championship in 1996. He then took a break from hockey until 1999 when he signed on for Djurgårdens IF for two seasons. Both seasons ended with Djurgården being Swedish champions. During the time he coached Djurgården, he implemented the torpedo hockey system. While coaching Djurgården, Nilsson was also head coach for Team Sweden, a position he kept until 2004. He moved to Austria to coach EC Salzburg in 2005. His contract ended in 2009 and he returned to Djurgården on May 1. He worked for Djurgården for another three years and left the club in January 2012 after three Swedish Championships with them as a coach.
