= Sall (patronymic) =

Sall is the surname of the Lam Toro dynasty (King of Toro) of Senegal in the 15th century.

- Moustapha Bayal Sall (born 1985), Senegalese football central defender
- Abdou Sall (born 1980), Senegalese footballer
- Khalifa Sall (born 1956), Senegalese politician
- Malick Sall (born 1956), Senegalese lawyer and politician
- Marieme Faye Sall, Senegalese engineer and public figure who has served as the First Lady of Senegal since 2012
- Ralph Sall, American record producer, music supervisor, composer, songwriter, and screenwriter
