= Salo, Spain =

Salo
- Singular population entity
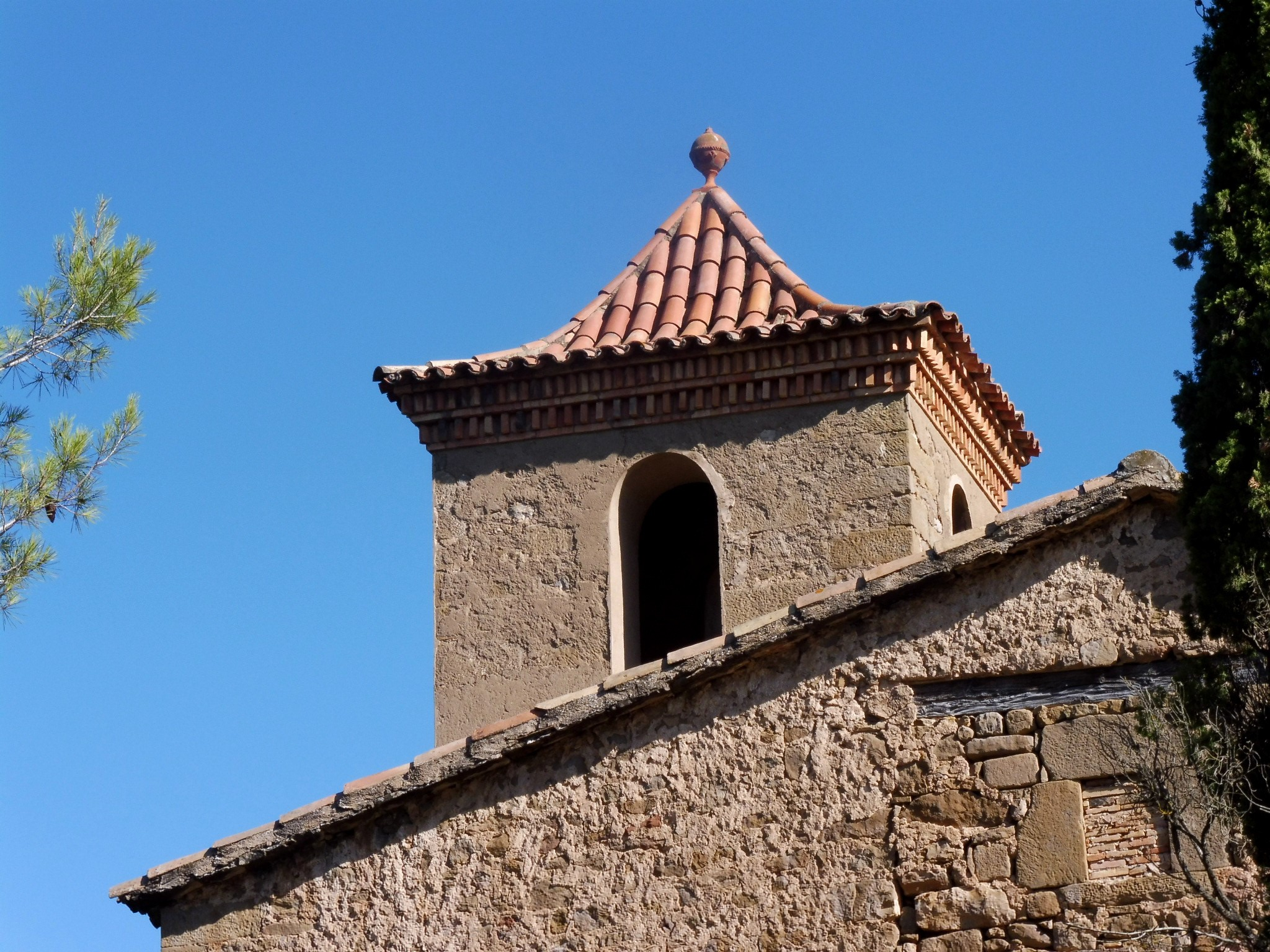
- Sant Pere i Sant Feliu de Salo

- Location within Spain Location within Catalonia Location within Province of Barcelona
- Coordinates: 41°50′39.9″N 1°38′37.7″E
- Country: Spain
- A. community: Catalunya
- Province: Barcelona
- Municipality: Sant Mateu de Bages

Population (January 1, 2024)
  - Total: 103
- Time zone: UTC+01:00
- Postal code: 08269
- MCN: 08229000300

Salo is a singular population entity in the municipality of Sant Mateu de Bages, in Catalonia, Spain.

As of 2024 it has a population of 103 people.
