= Torpedo system =

Positional strategy in ice hockey

Schematic demonstrating the torpedo system. The offensive team is moving from right to left. The torpedoes are marked T, halfbacks are marked H, the defenseman, or libero is marked D, and the goaltender is marked G.

The torpedo system is an ice hockey on-ice system first used by the Swedish team Djurgårdens IF. The coach of Djurgårdens IF, Hardy Nilsson, took the system with him and it was used extensively by the Swedish national hockey team in international competition. The system converts the traditional hockey layout of three forwards and two defensemen, into two torpedoes up front, two halfbacks, and one lone defenceman (or libero). The torpedoes are responsible for forechecking in the corners when the puck is in the offensive zone and stay around the neutral zone to be sprung into a scoring position (by a stretch pass or torpedo pass). The halfbacks are all-purpose players who run the offense from the faceoff circles in the offensive zone and defend against the other team's torpedoes. The libero protects the rear of the ice.

The system is used in international hockey by the Swedish team, due to the large ice surface, and the lack of a two-line pass offside (which would stop play with a two-line pass). It contrasted the neutral zone trap, which was popular in the 1990s, and which stifled fast skating and playmaking by crowding the neutral zone with players. The system was originated by the Boston Bruins in the late 1950s; it was later adopted by the Chicago Blackhawks during the 1960s. The torpedo mode could not be completely implemented in the National Hockey League until 2005 when the red line was eliminated, allowing for two-line passes to spring the torpedoes.

The system was used to describe the Swedish national men's hockey team's approach during the 2002 Winter Games, which was punctuated by a preliminary 5-2 win over the eventual gold-medal winning Canadian team.
