= Mikael Håkanson =

Swedish ice hockey player

- Born: May 31, 1974 (age 51) Spånga, Sweden
- Height: 6 ft 2 in (188 cm)
- Weight: 202 lb (92 kg; 14 st 6 lb)
- Position: Right wing
- Shot: Left
- Played for: Djurgårdens IF; Modo Hockey; St. John's Maple Leafs; Linköpings HC
- NHL draft: 125th overall, 1992; Toronto Maple Leafs
- Playing career: 1992–2012

Mikael Håkanson (born May 31, 1974) is a Swedish former professional ice hockey player who last played with the Linköpings HC team in the Swedish Hockey League (SHL, formerly named Elitserien or SEL), the top-tier league in Sweden.

== Playing career ==
Håkanson used to be the record holder for the number of SHL games played, both for the number of regular season games played and the combined total number of games played including playoff games. He surpassed Roger Åkerström's combined record on September 22, 2011, when he and his Linköpings HC team played a game against Skellefteå AIK at Cloetta Center which ended 4–0 in Skellefteå's favour. It was his 912th game.

At the time of his retirement after the end of the 2011–12 season, he had played 950 SHL games, 808 of which were regular-season ones. His regular season record was beaten on September 14, 2013, when David Petrasek played his 809th regular season game. After playing another four games in the 2013–14 season, Petrasek also beat Håkanson's combined record when he had played his 951st SHL game overall.

== Career statistics ==
=== Regular season and playoffs ===
			Regular season					Playoffs
Season	Team	League	GP	G	A	Pts	PIM	GP	G	A	Pts	PIM
1990–91	Nacka HK	SWE.2	27	2	5	7	6	—	—	—	—	—
1991–92	Nacka HK	SWE.2	29	3	15	18	24	—	—	—	—	—
1992–93	Djurgårdens IF	SEL	40	0	1	1	6	3	0	0	0	0
1993–94	Djurgårdens IF	SWE U20	4	2	5	7	4	—	—	—	—	—
1993–94	Djurgårdens IF	SEL	37	3	3	6	12	4	0	0	0	0
1994–95	Modo Hockey	SEL	37	3	7	10	16	—	—	—	—	—
1995–96	Modo Hockey	SEL	40	8	4	12	18	8	2	0	2	0
1996–97	Djurgårdens IF	SEL	48	8	12	20	12	4	0	0	0	0
1997–98	Djurgårdens IF	SEL	43	9	2	11	8	15	3	0	3	14
1998–99	Djurgårdens IF	SEL	50	13	12	25	14	4	1	0	1	0
1999–2000	Djurgårdens IF	SEL	48	17	17	34	26	13	3	8	11	12
2000–01	St. John's Maple Leafs	AHL	64	10	40	50	46	4	0	0	0	0
2001–02	Djurgårdens IF	SEL	49	13	24	37	86	2	0	0	0	4
2002–03	Linköpings HC	SEL	39	3	9	12	28	—	—	—	—	—
2003–04	Linköpings HC	SEL	35	6	12	18	24	5	2	0	2	16
2004–05	Linköpings HC	SEL	46	8	6	14	24	6	1	0	1	10
2005–06	Linköpings HC	SEL	40	9	12	21	46	12	5	4	9	16
2006–07	Linköpings HC	SEL	53	12	18	30	72	15	2	5	7	24
2007–08	Linköpings HC	SEL	44	11	21	32	40	16	5	5	10	10
2008–09	Linköpings HC	SEL	53	10	25	35	26	6	0	2	2	4
2009–10	Linköpings HC	SEL	39	15	20	35	16	12	2	5	7	27
2010–11	Linköpings HC	SEL	36	7	6	13	14	7	1	1	2	0
2011–12	Linköpings HC	SEL	31	3	5	8	6	—	—	—	—	—
SEL totals			808	158	216	374	494	132	27	30	57	137

=== International ===
Year	Team	Event	GP	G	A	Pts	PIM
1992	Sweden	EJC	6	0	1	1	10
1993	Sweden	WJC	7	0	1	1	4
1994	Sweden	WJC	7	2	0	2	6
2000	Sweden	WC	7	1	0	1	0
Junior totals			20	2	2	4	20
Senior totals			7	1	0	1	0
