= Salo (given name) =

The given name Salo may refer to:

== People ==
- Salo Finkelstein (1896 or 1897–date of death unknown), Polish mental calculator
- Salo Flohr (1908–1983), Czech chess player
- Salo Grenning (1918–1986), Norwegian illustrator
- Salo Landau (1903–1944), Dutch chess player
- Salo Weisselberger (1867–1931), Jewish leader, jurist and politician during the Austro-Hungarian Empire and later in Romania
- Salo Wittmayer Baron (1895–1989), American historian of Jewish ancestry

== Fictional characters ==
- Salo, character in The Sirens of Titan by Kurt Vonnegut
