= Jim Leavins =

Canadian ice hockey player

- Born: July 28, 1960 (age 65) Dinsmore, Saskatchewan, Canada
- Height: 6 ft 1 in (185 cm)
- Weight: 180 lb (82 kg; 12 st 12 lb)
- Position: Defence
- Shot: Left
- Played for: Detroit Red Wings; New York Rangers
- NHL draft: Undrafted
- Playing career: 1984–1995

James T. Leavins (born July 28, 1960) is a Canadian former professional ice hockey player who played 41 games in the National Hockey League for the Detroit Red Wings and New York Rangers during the 1985–86 and 1986–7 seasons. The rest of his career, which lasted from 1984 to 1995, was spent in various minor leagues.

On July 29, 1986, the Detroit Red Wings traded Leavins to the New York Rangers (along with Kelly Kisio, Lane Lambert, and a fifth round draft choice), in exchange for goalie Glen Hanlon and two future draft picks.

He was an all WCHA and all-American player at the University of Denver

== Career statistics ==
=== Regular season and playoffs ===
| | | | Regular season | | | | | Playoffs |
| Season | Team | League | GP | G | A | Pts | PIM | GP | G | A | Pts | PIM |
|---|---|---|---|---|---|---|---|---|---|---|---|---|
| 1978–79 | Regina Pats | WHL | 9 | 1 | 1 | 2 | 0 | — | — | — | — | — |
| 1980–81 | University of Denver | NCAA | 40 | 8 | 18 | 26 | 18 | — | — | — | — | — |
| 1981–82 | University of Denver | NCAA | 41 | 8 | 34 | 42 | 56 | — | — | — | — | — |
| 1982–83 | University of Denver | NCAA | 33 | 16 | 24 | 40 | 20 | — | — | — | — | — |
| 1983–84 | University of Denver | NCAA | 39 | 13 | 26 | 39 | 38 | — | — | — | — | — |
| 1984–85 | Fort Wayne Komets | IHL | 76 | 5 | 50 | 55 | 57 | 13 | 3 | 8 | 11 | 10 |
| 1985–86 | Detroit Red Wings | NHL | 37 | 2 | 11 | 13 | 23 | — | — | — | — | — |
| 1985–86 | Adirondack Red Wings | AHL | 36 | 4 | 21 | 25 | 19 | — | — | — | — | — |
| 1986–87 | New York Rangers | NHL | 4 | 0 | 1 | 1 | 4 | — | — | — | — | — |
| 1986–87 | New Haven Nighthawks | AHL | 54 | 7 | 21 | 28 | 16 | 7 | 0 | 4 | 4 | 2 |
| 1987–88 | New Haven Nighthawks | AHL | 11 | 2 | 5 | 7 | 6 | — | — | — | — | — |
| 1987–88 | Salt Lake Golden Eagles | IHL | 67 | 12 | 46 | 58 | 47 | 16 | 5 | 5 | 10 | 8 |
| 1988–89 | KooKoo | FIN | 42 | 12 | 11 | 23 | 59 | — | — | — | — | — |
| 1988–89 | Salt Lake Golden Eagles | IHL | 25 | 8 | 13 | 21 | 14 | 14 | 2 | 11 | 13 | 6 |
| 1989–90 | KooKoo | FIN | 44 | 7 | 24 | 31 | 36 | — | — | — | — | — |
| 1989–90 | Salt Lake Golden Eagles | IHL | 11 | 0 | 6 | 6 | 2 | 11 | 0 | 8 | 8 | 2 |
| 1990–91 | Färjestad BK | SWE | 40 | 9 | 8 | 17 | 24 | 8 | 0 | 3 | 3 | 8 |
| 1992–93 | HC Varese | ITA | 45 | 9 | 28 | 37 | 25 | 2 | 0 | 0 | 0 | 0 |
| IHL totals | | | 179 | 25 | 115 | 140 | 120 | 54 | 10 | 32 | 42 | 26 |
| NHL totals | | | 41 | 2 | 12 | 14 | 30 | — | — | — | — | — |

== Awards and honours ==
| Award | Year |
|---|---|
| All-WCHA First Team | 1983–84 |
