= SALL3 =

Protein-coding gene in the species Homo sapiens

Identifiers
- Aliases: SALL3, ZNF796, spalt-like transcription factor 3, spalt like transcription factor 3
- External IDs: OMIM: 605079; MGI: 109295; GeneCards: SALL3

Gene location (Human)
Chr.	Chromosome 18 (human)
Band	18q23	Start	78,979,818 bp
Band	18q23	End	79,002,677 bp

Gene location (Mouse)
Chr.	Chromosome 18 (mouse)
Band	18|18 E3	Start	81,009,591 bp
Band	18|18 E3	End	81,029,986 bp
RNA expression pattern
Bgee	Human / Mouse (ortholog); Top expressed in: ventricular zone; ganglionic eminence; amygdala; C1 segment; caudate nucleus; nucleus accumbens; putamen; hypothalamus; substantia nigra; testicle / Top expressed in: Rostral migratory stream; tail of embryo; Bowman's capsule; epiblast; ventricular zone; genital tubercle; primitive streak; olfactory bulb; perirhinal cortex; embryo; More reference expression data
BioGPS	n/a
Gene ontology
Molecular function	DNA-binding transcription factor activity; sequence-specific DNA binding; DNA binding; metal ion binding; nucleic acid binding; DNA-binding transcription factor activity, RNA polymerase II-specific
Cellular component	nucleus
Biological process	forelimb morphogenesis; neurogenesis; regulation of transcription, DNA-templated; negative regulation of smoothened signaling pathway; transcription by RNA polymerase II; olfactory bulb interneuron development; hindlimb morphogenesis; signal transduction; transcription, DNA-templated; regulation of transcription by RNA polymerase II
Sources:Amigo / QuickGO
Orthologs
Databases	NCBI: entry; OMA: entry
Species	Human	Mouse
Entrez	27164	20689
Ensembl	ENSG00000256463	ENSMUSG00000024565
UniProt	Q9BXA9	Q62255
RefSeq (mRNA)	NM_171999	NM_178280; NM_001369133
RefSeq (protein)	NP_741996	NP_840064; NP_001356062
Location (UCSC)	Chr 18: 78.98 – 79 Mb	Chr 18: 81.01 – 81.03 Mb
PubMed search
- Wikidata
View/Edit Human	View/Edit Mouse

Sal-like protein 3, also known as zinc finger protein SALL3, is a protein that in humans in encoded by the SALL3 gene.
