= Jens Öhling =

Swedish ice hockey player (born 1962)

- Born: 3 April 1962 (age 64) Nacka, Sweden
- Height: 6 ft 0 in (183 cm)
- Weight: 196 lb (89 kg; 14 st 0 lb)
- Position: Left wing
- Shot: Left
- Played for: Djurgårdens IF; Södertälje SK
- National team: Sweden
- NHL draft: 207th overall, 1980; Boston Bruins
- Playing career: 1979–1998

Jens Erik Öhling (born 3 April 1962) is a retired professional Swedish ice hockey player. He played for Djurgårdens IF during most of his professional career. He made his debut in Elitserien in 1979 against Västra Frölunda. Öhling was the team captain during the 1995–96 season. After 18 seasons in Djurgården, Öhling ended his career in Södertälje SK in 1998. The number 11 has been retired in his honour by Djurgården.

== Career statistics ==
=== Regular season and playoffs ===
| | | | Regular season | | | | | Playoffs |
| Season | Team | League | GP | G | A | Pts | PIM | GP | G | A | Pts | PIM |
|---|---|---|---|---|---|---|---|---|---|---|---|---|
| 1977–78 | NSA-76 | SWE II | 20 | 4 | 1 | 5 | 2 | — | — | — | — | — |
| 1978–79 | NSA-76 | SWE II | 24 | 6 | 6 | 12 | 6 | — | — | — | — | — |
| 1979–80 | Djurgårdens IF | SEL | 2 | 0 | 0 | 0 | 0 | — | — | — | — | — |
| 1980–81 | Djurgårdens IF | SEL | 33 | 10 | 2 | 12 | 10 | — | — | — | — | — |
| 1981–82 | Djurgårdens IF | SEL | 34 | 6 | 4 | 10 | 2 | — | — | — | — | — |
| 1982–83 | Djurgårdens IF | SEL | 35 | 17 | 15 | 32 | 10 | 8 | 2 | 2 | 4 | 0 |
| 1983–84 | Djurgårdens IF | SEL | 32 | 14 | 15 | 29 | 6 | — | — | — | — | — |
| 1984–85 | Djurgårdens IF | SEL | 36 | 15 | 16 | 31 | 4 | 8 | 3 | 3 | 6 | 0 |
| 1985–86 | Djurgårdens IF | SEL | 35 | 14 | 9 | 23 | 10 | — | — | — | — | — |
| 1986–87 | Djurgårdens IF | SEL | 30 | 4 | 11 | 15 | 4 | 2 | 0 | 0 | 0 | 0 |
| 1987–88 | Djurgårdens IF | SEL | 38 | 27 | 19 | 46 | 6 | 3 | 0 | 0 | 0 | 2 |
| 1988–89 | Djurgårdens IF | SEL | 38 | 9 | 10 | 19 | 14 | 8 | 6 | 2 | 8 | 2 |
| 1989–90 | Djurgårdens IF | SEL | 36 | 16 | 16 | 32 | 10 | 8 | 2 | 5 | 7 | 2 |
| 1990–91 | Djurgårdens IF | SEL | 38 | 11 | 16 | 27 | 2 | 4 | 2 | 1 | 3 | 2 |
| 1991–92 | Djurgårdens IF | SEL | 35 | 10 | 9 | 19 | 8 | 9 | 5 | 5 | 10 | 2 |
| 1992–93 | Djurgårdens IF | SEL | 23 | 2 | 8 | 10 | 9 | 6 | 2 | 3 | 5 | 0 |
| 1993–94 | Djurgårdens IF | SEL | 33 | 6 | 11 | 17 | 2 | 6 | 2 | 0 | 2 | 0 |
| 1994–95 | Djurgårdens IF | SEL | 36 | 9 | 13 | 22 | 6 | 3 | 0 | 2 | 2 | 0 |
| 1995–96 | Djurgårdens IF | SEL | 26 | 9 | 7 | 16 | 0 | 4 | 0 | 1 | 1 | 0 |
| 1996–97 | Djurgårdens IF | SEL | 47 | 13 | 11 | 24 | 6 | 4 | 0 | 0 | 0 | 0 |
| 1997–98 | Södertälje SK | SEL | 45 | 15 | 10 | 25 | 0 | — | — | — | — | — |
| SEL totals | | | 632 | 207 | 202 | 409 | 109 | 73 | 24 | 24 | 48 | 10 |

=== International ===
Jens Öhling
Medal record

Men's ice hockey

Olympic Games
| Bronze medal – third place | 1988 Calgary | Team |
| Bronze medal – third place | 1984 Sarajevo | Team |

| Year | Team | Event | GP | G | A | Pts | PIM |
|---|---|---|---|---|---|---|---|
| 1979 | Sweden | EJC | 5 | 2 | 0 | 2 | — |
| 1980 | Sweden | EJC | 5 | 4 | 3 | 7 | 6 |
| 1981 | Sweden | WJC | 5 | 1 | 3 | 4 | 6 |
| 1982 | Sweden | WJC | 7 | 0 | 9 | 9 | 6 |
| 1984 | Sweden | OG | 7 | 4 | 4 | 8 | 0 |
| 1985 | Sweden | WC | 10 | 1 | 2 | 3 | 8 |
| 1988 | Sweden | OG | 8 | 1 | 4 | 5 | 2 |
| 1989 | Sweden | WC | 10 | 0 | 1 | 1 | 0 |
| Junior totals | | | 22 | 7 | 15 | 22 | 18 |
| Senior totals | | | 35 | 6 | 11 | 17 | 10 |
