= Sweden at the 1988 Winter Olympics =

- IOC code: SWE
- NOC: Swedish Olympic Committee
- Website: www.sok.se (in Swedish and English)

in Calgary
- Competitors: 67 (54 men, 13 women) in 9 sports
- Flag bearer: Thomas Wassberg (cross-country skiing)
- Medals Ranked 5th: Gold 4 Silver 0 Bronze 2 Total 6

Winter Olympics appearances (overview)
- 1924; 1928; 1932; 1936; 1948; 1952; 1956; 1960; 1964; 1968; 1972; 1976; 1980; 1984; 1988; 1992; 1994; 1998; 2002; 2006; 2010; 2014; 2018; 2022; 2026

Sweden competed at the 1988 Winter Olympics in Calgary, Alberta, Canada.

== Medalists ==
Medal	Name	Sport	Event	Date
Gold	Tomas Gustafson	Speed skating	Men's 5000 metres	17 February
Gold	Tomas Gustafson	Speed skating	Men's 10,000 metres	21 February
Gold	Torgny Mogren; Jan Ottosson; Gunde Svan; Thomas Wassberg	Cross-country skiing	Men's 4 × 10 kilometre relay	22 February
Gold	Gunde Svan	Cross-country skiing	Men's 50 kilometre freestyle	27 February
Bronze	Lars-Börje Eriksson	Alpine skiing	Men's super-G	21 February
Bronze	Sweden men's national ice hockey team: Mikael Andersson; Peter Andersson; Peter Åslin; Jonas Bergqvist; Bo Berglund; Thom Eklund; Ulf Sandström; Anders Eldebrink; Peter Eriksson; Thomas Eriksson; Michael Hjälm; Lars Ivarsson; Mikael Johansson; Lars Karlsson; Håkan Södergren; Mats Kihlström; Peter Lindmark; Lars Molin; Jens Öhling; Lars-Gunnar Pettersson; Thomas Rundqvist; Tommy Samuelsson	Ice hockey	Men's competition	28 February

== Competitors ==
The following is the list of number of competitors in the Games.

Sport	Men	Women	Total
Alpine skiing	8	4	12
Biathlon	4	–	4
Bobsleigh	2	–	2
Cross-country skiing	5	7	12
Figure skating	1	1	2
Ice hockey	22	–	22
Luge	2	0	2
Ski jumping	4	–	4
Speed skating	6	1	7
Total	54	13	67

== Alpine skiing ==
Men

Athlete	Event	Race 1	Race 2	Total	
Athlete	Event	Time	Time	Time	Rank
Niklas Lindqvist	Downhill			2:09.41	40
Niklas Henning	Downhill			2:05.52	30
Lars-Börje Eriksson	Downhill			2:05.02	27
Niklas Henning	Super-G			DNF	–
Niklas Lindqvist	Super-G			1:44.88	20
Lars-Börje Eriksson	Super-G			1:41.08	3rd place, bronze medalist(s)
Ingemar Stenmark	Giant Slalom	1:08.49	DNF	DNF	–
Jörgen Sundqvist	Giant Slalom	1:07.68	1:04.43	2:12.11	22
Jonas Nilsson	Giant Slalom	1:07.58	1:04.40	2:11.98	21
Johan Wallner	Giant Slalom	1:06.84	1:04.46	2:11.30	16
Johan Wallner	Slalom	54.05	DNF	DNF	–
Lars-Göran Halvarsson	Slalom	53.33	DSQ	DSQ	–
Ingemar Stenmark	Slalom	52.71	47.51	1:40.22	5
Jonas Nilsson	Slalom	51.44	48.79	1:40.23	6

Men's combined

Athlete	Downhill	Slalom		Total	
Athlete	Time	Time 1	Time 2	Points	Rank
Niklas Lindqvist	1:56.63	46.02	DNF	DNF	–
Niklas Henning	1:51.16	46.11	45.06	96.25	10
Lars-Börje Eriksson	1:49.52	DNF	–	DNF	–

Women

Athlete	Event	Race 1	Race 2	Total	
Athlete	Event	Time	Time	Time	Rank
Monika Äijä	Giant Slalom	DNF	–	DNF	–
Kristina Andersson	Giant Slalom	1:04.01	1:11.08	2:15.09	22
Catharina Glassér-Bjerner	Giant Slalom	1:03.17	DNF	DNF	–
Camilla Nilsson	Giant Slalom	1:00.96	DNF	DNF	–
Kristina Andersson	Slalom	DNF	–	DNF	–
Monika Äijä	Slalom	DNF	–	DNF	–
Catharina Glassér-Bjerner	Slalom	50.88	DNF	DNF	–
Camilla Nilsson	Slalom	48.82	DNF	DNF	–

== Biathlon ==
Men

Event	Athlete	Misses ^{1}	Time	Rank
10 km Sprint	Leif Andersson	4	28:48.9	57
10 km Sprint	Roger Westling	4	28:24.8	54
10 km Sprint	Peter Sjödén	2	28:13.3	47
10 km Sprint	Mikael Löfgren	1	27:01.0	22

Event	Athlete	Time	Misses	Adjusted time ^{2}	Rank
20 km	Roger Westling	DNF	–	DNF	–
20 km	Mikael Löfgren	58:12.0	7	1'05:12.0	51
20 km	Leif Andersson	58:27.3	5	1'03:27.3	37
20 km	Peter Sjödén	59:07.9	3	1'02:07.8	31

Men's 4 x 7.5 km relay

Athletes	Race		
Athletes	Misses ^{1}	Time	Rank
Peter Sjödén; Mikael Löfgren; Roger Westling; Leif Andersson	3	1'29:11.9	7

^{1} A penalty loop of 150 metres had to be skied per missed target.
^{2} One minute added per missed target.

== Bobsleigh ==
Sled	Athletes	Event	Run 1		Run 2		Run 3		Run 4		Total	
Sled	Athletes	Event	Time	Rank	Time	Rank	Time	Rank	Time	Rank	Time	Rank
SWE-1	Per-Anders Persson; Rolf Åkerström	Two-man	58.40	16	59.99	14	1:00.99	17	59.71	13	3:59.09	14

== Cross-country skiing ==
Men

Event	Athlete	Race	
Event	Athlete	Time	Rank
15 km C	Torgny Mogren	44:12.1	24
15 km C	Jan Ottosson	43:18.1	16
15 km C	Gunde Svan	43:07.3	13
15 km C	Christer Majbäck	42:58.6	11
30 km C	Thomas Wassberg	1'34:07.6	42
30 km C	Jan Ottosson	1'28:51.7	16
30 km C	Torgny Mogren	1'27:55.7	11
30 km C	Gunde Svan	1'27:30.8	10
50 km F	Thomas Wassberg	DNF	–
50 km F	Torgny Mogren	2'12:20.2	28
50 km F	Jan Ottosson	2'07:34.8	6
50 km F	Gunde Svan	2'04:30.9	1st place, gold medalist(s)

C = Classical style, F = Freestyle

Men's 4 × 10 km relay

Athletes	Race	
Athletes	Time	Rank
Jan Ottosson; Thomas Wassberg; Gunde Svan; Torgny Mogren	1'43:58.6	1st place, gold medalist(s)

Women

Event	Athlete	Race	
Event	Athlete	Time	Rank
5 km C	Karin Svingstedt	16:15.0	23
5 km C	Marie Johansson	16:12.1	21
5 km C	Anna-Lena Fritzon	15:55.6	17
5 km C	Marie-Helene Westin	15:28.9	7
10 km C	Annika Dahlman	32:31.4	28
10 km C	Karin Svingstedt	31:57.0	22
10 km C	Anna-Lena Fritzon	31:19.3	13
10 km C	Marie-Helene Westin	30:53.5	8
20 km F	Karin Lamberg-Skog	1'00:34.6	22
20 km F	Lis Frost	59:59.6	21
20 km F	Marie-Helene Westin	58:39.4	10
20 km F	Anna-Lena Fritzon	58:37.4	9

C = Classical style, F = Freestyle

Women's 4 × 5 km relay

Athletes	Race	
Athletes	Time	Rank
Lis Frost; Anna-Lena Fritzon; Karin Lamberg-Skog; Marie-Helene Westin	1'02:24.9	6

== Figure skating ==
Men

Athlete	CF	SP	FS	TFP	Rank
Peter Johansson	23	22	24	46.6	24

Women

Athlete	CF	SP	FS	TFP	Rank
Lotta Falkenback	25	13	21	41.2	21

== Ice hockey ==
Summary

Team	Event	Group stage						Medal round / Placement match			
Team	Event	Opposition Score	Opposition Score	Opposition Score	Opposition Score	Opposition Score	Rank	Opposition Score	Opposition Score	Opposition Score	Rank
Sweden men's	Men's tournament	France; W 13–2	Poland; T 1–1	Switzerland; W 4–2	Finland; T 3–3	Canada; T 2–2	2 Q	Czechoslovakia; W 6–2	Soviet Union; L 1–7	West Germany; W 3–2	3rd place, bronze medalist(s)

=== Group A ===
Top three teams (shaded ones) entered the medal round.

	Pld	W	L	T	GF	GA	Pts
Finland	5	3	1	1	22	8	7
Sweden	5	2	0	3	23	10	7
Canada	5	3	1	1	17	12	7
Switzerland	5	3	2	0	19	10	6
Poland	5	1	3	1	9	13	3
France	5	0	5	0	10	47	0

- Sweden 13-2 France
- Sweden 1-1 Poland
- Sweden 4-2 Switzerland
- Finland 3-3 Sweden
- Canada 2-2 Sweden

=== Medal round ===
The top three teams from each group play the top three teams from the other group once. Points from previous games against their own group carry over.

	Pld	W	L	T	GF	GA	Pts
Soviet Union	5	4	1	0	25	7	8
Finland	5	3	1	1	18	10	7
Sweden (bronze)	5	2	1	2	15	16	6
Canada	5	2	2	1	17	14	5
West Germany	5	1	4	0	8	26	2
Czechoslovakia	5	1	4	0	12	22	2

- Sweden 6-2 Czechoslovakia
- Soviet Union 7-1 Sweden
- Sweden 3-2 West Germany

=== Leading scorers ===
Rk		GP	G	A	Pts	PIM
8th	Anders Eldebrink	8	4	6	10	4

- Team roster

- Peter Lindmark
- Peter Åslin
- Peter Andersson
- Anders Eldebrink
- Thomas Eriksson
- Lars Ivarsson
- Mats Kihlström
- Lars Karlsson
- Tommy Samuelsson
- Mikael Andersson
- Jonas Bergqvist
- Bo Berglund
- Thom Eklund
- Peter Eriksson
- Michael Hjälm
- Mikael Johansson
- Lars Molin
- Lars-Gunnar Pettersson
- Thomas Rundqvist
- Ulf Sandström
- Håkan Södergren
- Jens Öhling

- Head coach: Tommy Sandlin

== Luge ==
Men

Athlete	Run 1		Run 2		Run 3		Run 4		Total	
Athlete	Time	Rank	Time	Rank	Time	Rank	Time	Rank	Time	Rank
Anders Näsström	47.517	23	47.931	28	48.083	26	48.191	27	3:11.722	25
Mikael Holm	47.409	21	47.165	17	47.423	19	47.661	20	3:09.658	20

== Ski jumping ==
Athlete	Event	Jump 1		Jump 2		Total	
Athlete	Event	Distance	Points	Distance	Points	Points	Rank
Jan Boklöv	Normal hill	78.0	85.4	80.5	92.4	177.8	28
Per-Inge Tällberg	Normal hill	79.5	89.3	78.0	84.9	174.2	36
Anders Daun	Normal hill	79.5	90.8	78.0	88.4	179.2	27
Staffan Tällberg	Normal hill	83.0	99.9	81.0	98.2	198.1	8
Anders Daun	Large hill	104.5	95.2	100.0	87.9	183.1	21
Per-Inge Tällberg	Large hill	106.0	97.8	99.0	84.0	181.8	22
Jan Boklöv	Large hill	109.0	99.5	100.0	85.9	185.4	18
Staffan Tällberg	Large hill	110.0	104.9	102.0	91.7	196.6	8

Men's team large hill

Athletes	Result	
Athletes	Points ^{1}	Rank
Per-Inge Tällberg; Anders Daun; Jan Boklöv; Staffan Tällberg	539.7	7

^{1} Four teams members performed two jumps each. The best three were counted.

== Speed skating ==
Men

Event	Athlete	Race	
Event	Athlete	Time	Rank
500 m	Claes Bengtsson	38.66	32
500 m	Hans Magnusson	38.60	30
500 m	Göran Johansson	37.69	18
1000 m	Göran Johansson	1:16.33	30
1000 m	Hans Magnusson	1:15.79	27
1000 m	Claes Bengtsson	1:15.07	21
1500 m	Joakim Karlberg	DNF	–
1500 m	Hans Magnusson	1:56.44	24
1500 m	Claes Bengtsson	1:55.16	13
5000 m	Joakim Karlberg	7:02.30	30
5000 m	Per Bengtsson	6:57.05	19
5000 m	Tomas Gustafson	6:44.63 OR	1st place, gold medalist(s)
10,000 m	Joakim Karlberg	14:22.94	12
10,000 m	Tomas Gustafson	13:48.20 WR	1st place, gold medalist(s)

Women

Event	Athlete	Race	
Event	Athlete	Time	Rank
500 m	Jasmin Krohn	42.81	28
3000 m	Jasmin Krohn	4:25.06	10
5000 m	Jasmin Krohn	7:36.56	8
