= Lars Ivarsson =

Swedish ice hockey player

Medal record

Representing Sweden

Men's Ice Hockey
Bronze medal – third place	1988 Calgary	Team

Lars-Göran Ivarsson (born October 21, 1963) is an ice hockey player who played for the Swedish national team. He won a bronze medal at the 1988 Winter Olympics. He played for Brynäs from 1984 until 1988, for HV71 from 1988 until 1993 and for Vasteras IK from 1978 until 1984, 1994–1997. And for KaiPa from 1997 to 1998.

== Career statistics ==
=== Regular season and playoffs ===
			Regular season					Playoffs
Season	Team	League	GP	G	A	Pts	PIM	GP	G	A	Pts	PIM
1978–79	Västerås IK	SWE II	10	0	1	1	4	—	—	—	—	—
1979–80	Västerås IK	SWE II	24	1	3	4	4	—	—	—	—	—
1980–81	Västerås IK	SWE II	23	2	2	4	30	3	1	1	2	0
1981–82	Västerås IK	SWE II	34	4	13	17	28	4	0	0	0	8
1982–83	Västerås IK	SWE II	31	8	5	13	26	5	0	0	0	4
1983–84	Västerås IK	SWE II	30	8	16	24	22	12	4	5	9	6
1984–85	Brynäs IF	SEL	36	6	21	27	40	—	—	—	—	—
1985–86	Brynäs IF	SEL	36	4	21	25	36	3	1	4	5	0
1986–87	Brynäs IF	SEL	36	9	19	28	42	—	—	—	—	—
1987–88	Brynäs IF	SEL	38	7	12	19	38	—	—	—	—	—
1988–89	HV71	SEL	40	1	20	21	34	3	1	3	4	2
1989–90	HV71	SEL	40	5	4	9	24	—	—	—	—	—
1990–91	HV71	SEL	40	5	15	20	28	2	0	0	0	0
1991–92	HV71	SEL	36	3	20	23	18	3	0	0	0	0
1992–93	HV71	SEL	35	0	8	8	20	—	—	—	—	—
1993–94	Västerås IK	SEL	40	1	12	13	28	4	0	2	2	6
1994–95	Surahammars IF	SWE II	4	0	5	5	4	—	—	—	—	—
1994–95	Västerås IK	SEL	32	3	7	10	24	3	0	0	0	2
1995–96	Västerås IK	SEL	39	2	5	7	12	—	—	—	—	—
1996–97	Västerås IK	SEL	46	4	11	15	24	—	—	—	—	—
1997–98	KalPa	Liiga	12	0	4	4	8	—	—	—	—	—
1997–98	Kapfenberger SV	AUT	28	1	4	5	6	—	—	—	—	—
1998–99	HC Bolzano	ITA	22	1	14	15	4	—	—	—	—	—
1998–99	HC Bolzano	Alp	27	3	13	16	6	—	—	—	—	—
2000–01	Västerås IK Ungdom	SWE III	20	0	13	13	12	—	—	—	—	—
2001–02	Västerås IK Ungdom	SWE II	42	3	19	22	24	10	0	3	3	4
SWE II totals			198	26	64	90	142	34	5	9	14	22
SEL totals			494	50	175	225	368	18	2	9	11	10

=== International ===
Year	Team	Event	GP	G	A	Pts	PIM
1980	Sweden	EJC	4	0	2	2	4
1981	Sweden	EJC	5	3	2	5	4
1988	Sweden	OG	2	1	2	3	0
