= Leif Carlsson =

Swedish ice hockey player and general manager

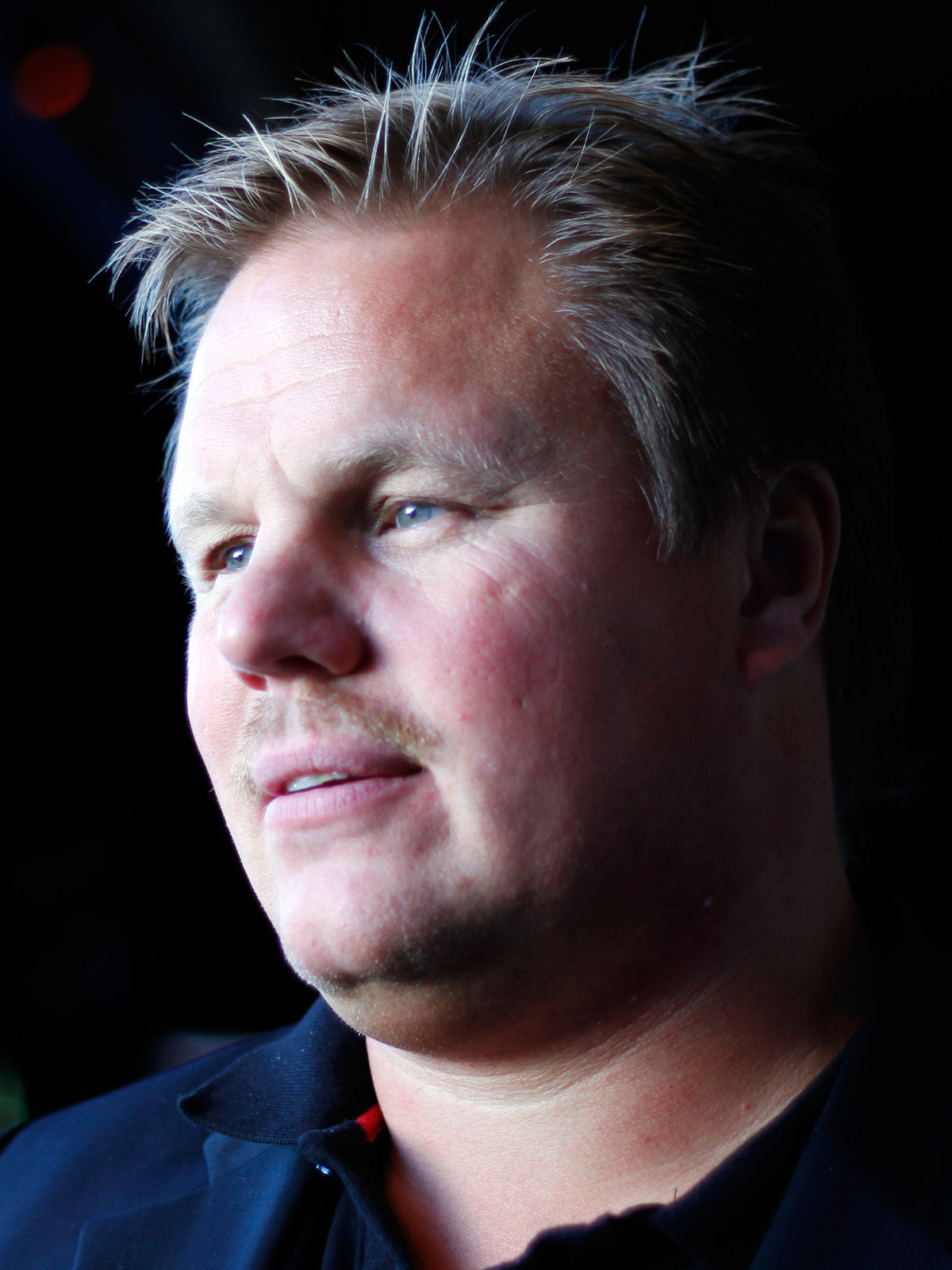
- Leif Carlsson (2012)
- Born: February 18, 1965 (age 61) Ludvika, Sweden
- Height: 6 ft 1 in (185 cm)
- Weight: 216 lb (98 kg; 15 st 6 lb)
- Position: Defence
- Shot: Left
- Played for: Mora IK; Färjestad BK; Västra Frölunda HC; EHC Biel-Bienne; Eisbären Berlin; Revierlöwen Oberhausen; Grums IK
- NHL draft: 61st overall, 1983; Hartford Whalers
- Playing career: 1982–2003

Leif Carlsson (born February 18, 1965) is a Swedish former professional ice hockey defenceman. Until November 2021 he was the head coach of EV Landshut of the DEL2. Carlsson was selected by the Hartford Whalers in the 3rd round (61st overall) of the 1983 NHL entry draft.

== Career statistics ==
			Regular season					Playoffs
Season	Team	League	GP	G	A	Pts	PIM	GP	G	A	Pts	PIM
1981–82	Mora IK J20	Juniorserien	—	—	—	—	—	—	—	—	—	—
1982–83	Mora IK J20	Juniorserien	—	—	—	—	—	—	—	—	—	—
1982–83	Mora IK	Division 1	30	2	7	9	20	—	—	—	—	—
1983–84	Färjestad BK J20	Juniorserien	—	—	—	—	—	—	—	—	—	—
1983–84	Färjestad BK	Elitserien	19	3	0	3	10	—	—	—	—	—
1984–85	Färjestad BK	Elitserien	36	4	8	12	24	3	0	0	0	0
1985–86	Färjestad BK	Elitserien	36	7	6	13	22	7	1	3	4	4
1986–87	Färjestad BK	Elitserien	33	9	4	13	18	7	2	2	4	10
1987–88	Färjestad BK	Elitserien	40	10	14	24	26	9	2	1	3	4
1988–89	Färjestad BK	Elitserien	39	6	6	12	38	2	1	0	1	0
1989–90	Västra Frölunda HC	Elitserien	37	2	9	11	24	—	—	—	—	—
1990–91	Västra Frölunda HC	Elitserien	22	1	3	4	10	—	—	—	—	—
1990–91	Västra Frölunda HC	Allsvenskan D1	8	1	1	2	4	—	—	—	—	—
1991–92	Färjestad BK	Elitserien	40	8	13	21	26	6	2	1	3	0
1992–93	Färjestad BK	Elitserien	40	11	11	22	18	3	1	0	1	0
1993–94	Färjestad BK	Elitserien	22	6	4	10	12	—	—	—	—	—
1993–94	Färjestad BK	Allsvenskan D1	18	6	11	17	12	—	—	—	—	—
1994–95	EHC Biel-Bienne	NLA	31	5	10	15	4	—	—	—	—	—
1995–96	Färjestad BK	Elitserien	37	13	13	26	16	8	1	2	3	2
1996–97	Eisbären Berlin	DEL	47	5	25	30	8	8	2	3	5	0
1997–98	Eisbären Berlin	DEL	45	3	13	16	10	10	1	2	3	4
1998–99	Eisbären Berlin	DEL	50	9	23	32	18	8	1	5	6	4
1999–00	Eisbären Berlin	DEL	55	8	18	26	16	—	—	—	—	—
2000–01	Revierlöwen Oberhausen	DEL	60	6	27	33	30	3	1	0	1	2
2001–02	Grums IK	Division 1	—	—	—	—	—	—	—	—	—	—
2002–03	Grums IK	Division 1	—	—	—	—	—	10	1	4	5	6
Elitserien totals			401	80	91	171	244	45	10	9	19	20
DEL totals			257	31	106	137	82	29	5	10	15	10
NLA totals			31	5	10	15	4	—	—	—	—	—
