= Ricard Persson =

Swedish professional ice hockey player (born 1969)

- Born: August 24, 1969 (age 57) Östersund, Sweden
- Height: 6 ft 2 in (188 cm)
- Weight: 205 lb (93 kg; 14 st 9 lb)
- Position: Defence
- Shot: Left
- Played for: Leksands IF; Malmö IF; New Jersey Devils; St. Louis Blues; Ottawa Senators; Eisbären Berlin; EC KAC; Oji Eagles; SG Cortina
- National team: Sweden
- NHL draft: 23rd overall, 1987; New Jersey Devils
- Playing career: 1987–2010

Lars Ricard Persson (born August 24, 1969) is a Swedish professional ice hockey player. Persson played in the NHL with the New Jersey Devils, St. Louis Blues, and Ottawa Senators.

== Playing career ==
Persson was drafted by the New Jersey Devils in the 2nd round, 23rd overall in the 1987 NHL entry draft. Rather than join the Devils though Persson chose to stay in his native Sweden where he played in the Elitserien where played for eight seasons, six with Leksands IF and two with Malmö IF. The 1994–1995 season finally saw Persson arrive to North America when he joined the Albany River Rats of the AHL for the playoffs after finishing the regular season in Sweden.

Persson then played the majority of the following season with the River Rats but also made his NHL debut with the Devils, appearing in 12 games. The 1996–1997 season saw Persson start the year off with the River Rats, along with one game with the Devils, before he was traded to the St. Louis Blues. With the Blues Persson had a chance to crack the starting lineup. He played the majority of his NHL career with the Blues but thanks to injuries and numerous stints with the Blues minor league affiliate Worcester IceCats never played more than 54 games in a season. He recorded the primary assist of a series-winning goal during the first overtime of game 7 of the Blues' first round matchup against the Phoenix Coyotes in 1999 when his shot from the top of the faceoff circle was deflected into the net by Pierre Turgeon.

Prior to the 2000–2001 season Persson signed as a free agent with the Ottawa Senators. During his first year though he missed the majority of the games due to an ankle injury, and the following season he was a healthy reserve for the majority of the season. After taking a foolish penalty for a check on Tie Domi, he was widely blamed for the Senators losing a playoff series to the Toronto Maple Leafs, and ending the Senators' hope for a Stanley Cup that season. Domi would later admit in his autobiography to throwing himself to the boards intentionally to draw the penalty.

Following his two years with the Senators, Persson played in Germany with Eisbären Berlin for three years. He then played in Austria for EC KAC before joining the Oji Eagles of the Asia League Ice Hockey, spending two seasons with each team. He would play one more season afterwards in Italy for SG Cortina before retiring.

== Career statistics ==
=== Regular season and playoffs ===
			Regular season					Playoffs
Season	Team	League	GP	G	A	Pts	PIM	GP	G	A	Pts	PIM
1984–85	Östersunds IK	SWE.2	13	0	3	3	6	—	—	—	—	—
1985–86	Östersunds IK	SWE.2	24	2	2	4	16	—	—	—	—	—
1986–87	Östersunds IK	SWE.2	31	10	11	21	28	—	—	—	—	—
1987–88	Leksands IF	SEL	21	2	0	2	8	2	0	1	1	2
1988–89	Leksands IF	SEL	33	2	4	6	28	9	0	1	1	6
1989–90	Leksands IF	SEL	40	9	10	19	56	3	0	0	0	6
1990–91	Leksands IF	SEL	19	3	4	7	20	—	—	—	—	—
1990–91	Leksands IF	Allsv	18	3	5	8	18	4	0	0	0	4
1991–92	Leksands IF	SEL	21	0	7	7	28	—	—	—	—	—
1991–92	Leksands IF	Allsv	18	6	3	9	18	11	4	3	7	16
1992–93	Leksands IF	SEL	36	7	15	22	56	2	0	2	2	0
1993–94	Malmö IF	SEL	40	11	9	20	38	11	2	0	2	12
1994–95	Malmö IF	SEL	31	3	13	16	34	9	0	2	2	8
1994–95	Albany River Rats	AHL	—	—	—	—	—	9	3	5	8	7
1995–96	Albany River Rats	AHL	67	15	31	46	59	4	0	0	0	7
1995–96	New Jersey Devils	NHL	12	2	1	3	8	—	—	—	—	—
1996–97	Albany River Rats	AHL	13	1	4	5	8	—	—	—	—	—
1996–97	New Jersey Devils	NHL	1	0	0	0	0	—	—	—	—	—
1996–97	St. Louis Blues	NHL	53	4	8	12	45	6	0	0	0	27
1997–98	Worcester IceCats	AHL	32	2	16	18	58	10	3	7	10	24
1997–98	St. Louis Blues	NHL	1	0	0	0	0	—	—	—	—	—
1998–99	Worcester IceCats	AHL	19	6	4	10	42	—	—	—	—	—
1998–99	St. Louis Blues	NHL	54	1	12	13	94	13	0	3	3	17
1999–2000	Worcester IceCats	AHL	2	0	1	1	0	—	—	—	—	—
1999–2000	St. Louis Blues	NHL	41	0	8	8	38	3	1	0	1	0
2000–01	Ottawa Senators	NHL	33	1	8	9	35	2	0	0	0	0
2001–02	Ottawa Senators	NHL	34	2	7	9	42	2	0	0	0	15
2002–03	Eisbären Berlin	DEL	42	11	24	35	80	9	1	5	6	2
2003–04	Eisbären Berlin	DEL	25	6	7	13	36	11	3	5	8	10
2004–05	Eisbären Berlin	DEL	52	4	14	18	40	12	0	1	1	4
2005–06	EC KAC	AUT	48	17	18	35	40	—	—	—	—	—
2006–07	EC KAC	AUT	36	7	14	21	98	—	—	—	—	—
2007–08	Oji Eagles	ALH	30	11	17	28	54	9	4	7	11	24
2008–09	Oji Eagles	ALH	32	12	25	37	68	2	0	2	2	2
2009–10	SG Cortina	ITA	40	10	20	30	30	—	—	—	—	—
SEL totals			241	37	62	99	268	36	2	6	8	34
NHL totals			229	10	44	54	262	26	1	3	4	59

=== International ===
Ricard Persson
Medal record

Representing Sweden

World Junior Championships
Silver medal – second place	1989 Anchorage	Ice hockey

Year	Team	Event	GP	G	A	Pts	PIM
1987	Sweden	EJC	7	2	1	3	0
1988	Sweden	WJC	7	2	5	7	12
1989	Sweden	WJC	7	3	6	9	10
2000	Sweden	WC	7	0	0	0	6
Junior totals			21	7	12	19	22
Senior totals			7	0	0	0	6
