= Petri Liimatainen =

Swedish ice hockey player

- Born: July 20, 1969 (age 56) Hässelby, SWE
- Height: 5 ft 11 in (180 cm)
- Weight: 196 lb (89 kg; 14 st 0 lb)
- Position: Defence
- Shot: Left
- Played for: AIK (SEL); Malmö IF (SEL); Krefeld Pinguine (DEL); SC Bern (NLA); Berlin Capitals (DEL); Kölner Haie (DEL); Södertälje SK (SEL); HC Lugano (NLA); EHC Basel (NLA); Füchse Duisburg (DEL); Linköpings HC (SEL); EHC Black Wings Linz (EBEL); Hvidovre Fighters (Metal Ligaen)
- National team: Sweden
- Playing career: 1987–2010

Petri Mikael Liimatainen (born July 20, 1969, in Hässelby, Sweden) is a former professional ice hockey defenceman. He currently serves as an assistant coach for Malmö Redhawks in the SHL.

== Career ==
Liimatainen began his career with AIK IF in Sweden's Elitserien. After seven seasons he moved to Malmö IF in 1993. In 1995, Liimatainen moved to Germany's Deutsche Eishockey Liga and signed with the Krefeld Pinguine. After a four-year stay, he moved to Switzerland's Nationalliga A with SC Bern but after one season he returned to the DEL and spent the next two seasons playing for the Berlin Capitals and the Kölner Haie

In 2002, he returned to Elitserien and returned to Malmö for a second spell. He stayed for two seasons before moving to Södertälje SK in 2004. He then spent the next three seasons playing in Switzerland for HC Lugano and EHC Basel, Germany for Füchse Duisburg and in Sweden for Linköpings HC as well as a spell in Austria's Erste Bank Eishockey Liga for EHC Black Wings Linz. In 2009, he signed for the Hvidovre Fighters in Denmark's Metal Ligaen.

At the end of the 2009/2010 season, Liimatainen ended his career as a player.

== Career statistics ==
=== Regular season and playoffs ===
			Regular season					Playoffs
Season	Team	League	GP	G	A	Pts	PIM	GP	G	A	Pts	PIM
1985–86	AIK	SWE U20
1986–87	AIK	SWE U20
1986–87	AIK	SWE.2	1	0	0	0	0	—	—	—	—	—
1987–88	AIK	SEL	27	1	3	4	5	5	0	1	1	2
1988–89	AIK	SEL	33	4	4	8	6	2	0	0	0	2
1989–90	AIK	SEL	40	7	11	18	18	3	0	0	0	2
1990–91	AIK	SEL	35	5	3	8	10	—	—	—	—	—
1991–92	AIK	SEL	40	4	13	17	24	3	1	0	1	0
1992–93	AIK	SEL	22	3	4	7	14	—	—	—	—	—
1992–93	AIK	Allsv	18	5	9	14	8	2	0	0	0	4
1993–94	Malmö IF	SEL	40	5	14	19	20	11	1	3	4	8
1994–95	Malmö IF	SEL	34	3	9	12	8	9	2	5	7	6
1995–96	Krefeld Pinguine	DEL	47	13	26	39	10	6	3	5	8	6
1996–97	Krefeld Pinguine	DEL	46	11	35	46	18	3	1	0	1	2
1997–98	Krefeld Pinguine	DEL	42	10	19	29	32	10	4	3	7	14
1998–99	Krefeld Pinguine	DEL	51	14	24	38	46	4	0	1	1	8
1999–2000	SC Bern	NLA	44	9	13	22	38	5	1	0	1	10
2000–01	Berlin Capitals	DEL	59	11	26	37	48	5	0	0	0	4
2001–02	Kölner Haie	DEL	54	6	26	32	28	13	3	1	4	12
2002–03	MIF Redhawks	SEL	50	6	19	25	73	—	—	—	—	—
2003–04	Malmö Redhawks	SEL	50	5	11	16	51	—	—	—	—	—
2004–05	Södertälje SK	SEL	48	10	5	15	67	10	3	1	4	6
2005–06	Södertälje SK	SEL	38	3	12	15	67	—	—	—	—	—
2006–07	HC Lugano	NLA	1	0	0	0	0	—	—	—	—	—
2006–07	EHC Basel	NLA	26	2	5	7	32	—	—	—	—	—
2007–08	Füchse Duisburg	DEL	54	5	21	26	56	—	—	—	—	—
2008–09	Linköpings HC	SEL	7	0	0	0	10	—	—	—	—	—
2008–09	EHC Liwest Black Wings Linz	AUT	28	3	6	9	24	10	0	4	4	10
2009–10	Hvidovre Ligahockey	DEN	36	5	10	15	32	5	1	2	3	6
SEL totals			464	61	103	164	373	43	7	10	17	26
DEL totals			353	70	177	247	238	41	11	10	21	46

=== International ===
Year	Team	Event	GP	G	A	Pts	PIM
1987	Sweden	EJC	7	1	2	3	8
1988	Sweden	WJC	7	0	2	2	2
1989	Sweden	WJC	7	0	0	0	6
1992	Sweden	OG	8	0	0	0	6
1992	Sweden	WC	5	0	0	0	0
Junior totals			21	1	4	5	16
Senior totals			13	0	0	0	6
