= Arto Blomsten =

Swedish ice hockey player

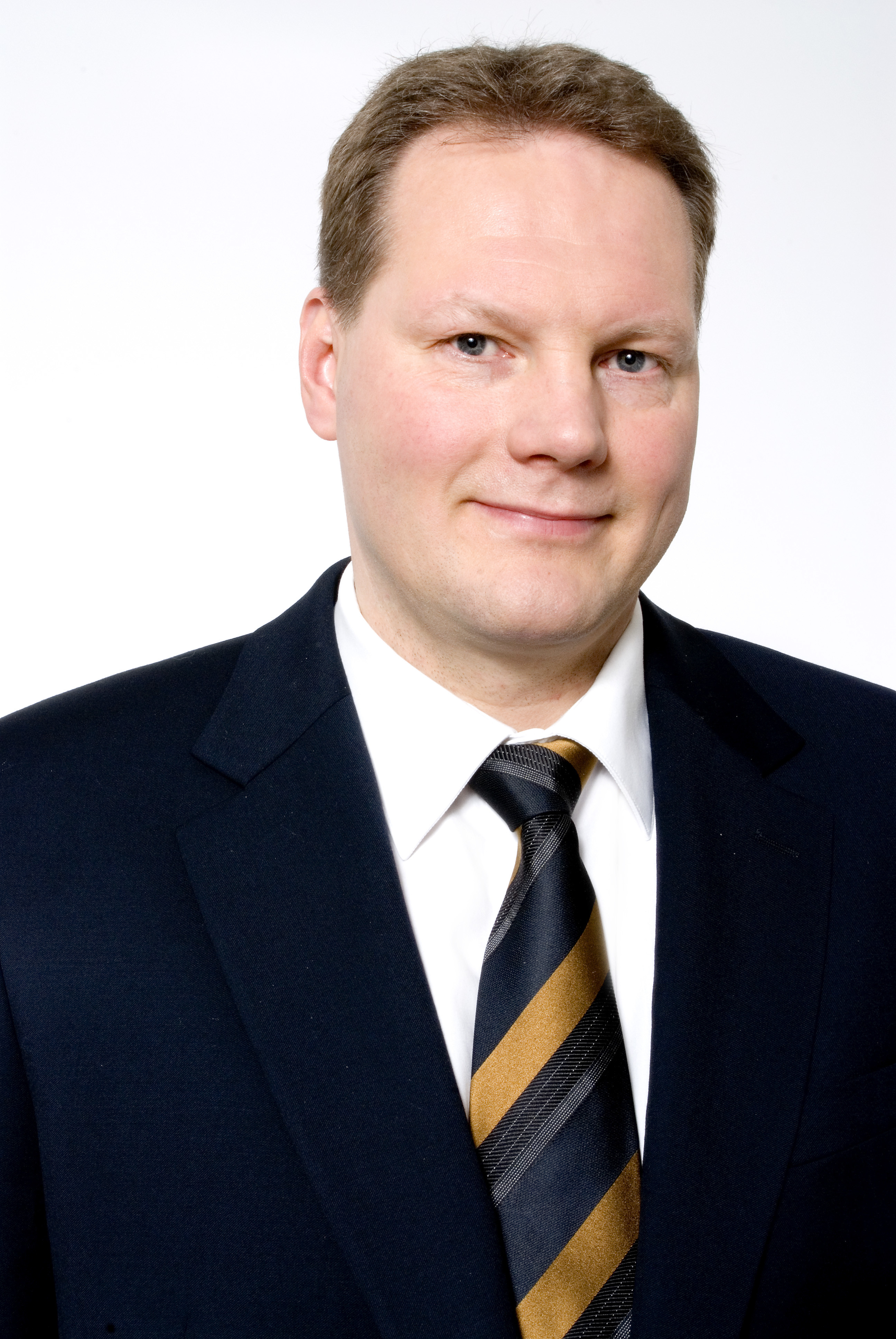
- Arto Blomsten as a colour commentator in February 2013
- Born: March 16, 1965 (age 61) Vaasa, Finland
- Height: 6 ft 4 in (193 cm)
- Weight: 204 lb (93 kg; 14 st 8 lb)
- Position: Defence
- Shot: Left
- Played for: Winnipeg Jets; Los Angeles Kings
- NHL draft: 239th overall, 1986; Winnipeg Jets
- Playing career: 1985–2000

Arto Tapio Blomsten (born March 16, 1965) is a Finnish-born Swedish former professional ice hockey defenceman. He was drafted in the twelfth round, 239th overall, by the Winnipeg Jets in the 1986 NHL entry draft. He played twenty-five games in the National Hockey League: nineteen with the Jets and six with the Los Angeles Kings. Born in Finland, Blomsten moved to Sweden when he was four years old.

== Career statistics ==
=== Regular season and playoffs ===
			Regular season					Playoffs
Season	Team	League	GP	G	A	Pts	PIM	GP	G	A	Pts	PIM
1983–84	Djurgårdens IF	SWE	3	0	0	0	4	—	—	—	—	—
1984–85	Djurgårdens IF	SWE	8	0	0	0	8	8	0	0	0	8
1985–86	Djurgårdens IF	SWE	8	0	3	3	6	—	—	—	—	—
1986–87	Djurgårdens IF	SWE	29	2	4	6	28	2	0	1	1	0
1987–88	Djurgårdens IF	SWE	39	12	6	18	36	2	1	0	1	0
1988–89	Djurgårdens IF	SWE	40	10	8	18	38	8	4	0	4	8
1989–90	Djurgårdens IF	SWE	37	5	20	25	28	8	0	1	1	6
1990–91	Djurgårdens IF	SWE	38	2	9	11	42	7	2	1	3	12
1991–92	Djurgårdens IF	SWE	39	6	8	14	34	10	2	0	2	8
1992–93	Djurgårdens IF	SWE	40	4	16	20	56	—	—	—	—	—
1993–94	Winnipeg Jets	NHL	18	0	2	2	6	—	—	—	—	—
1993–94	Moncton Hawks	AHL	44	6	27	33	25	20	4	10	14	8
1994–95	Winnipeg Jets	NHL	1	0	0	0	2	—	—	—	—	—
1994–95	Springfield Falcons	AHL	27	3	16	19	20	—	—	—	—	—
1994–95	Los Angeles Kings	NHL	4	0	1	1	0	—	—	—	—	—
1994–95	Phoenix Roadrunners	IHL	2	1	2	3	0	8	3	6	9	6
1995–96	Los Angeles Kings	NHL	2	0	1	1	0	—	—	—	—	—
1995–96	Phoenix Roadrunners	IHL	47	4	15	19	10	4	0	4	4	2
1996–97	Västra Frölunda	SWE	41	4	10	14	22	3	0	0	0	0
1997–98	Västra Frölunda	SWE	45	4	4	8	18	7	0	0	0	10
1998–99	Västerås IK	SWE	47	2	2	4	42	—	—	—	—	—
1999–00	Västerås IK	SWE	11	0	0	0	6	—	—	—	—	—
SWE totals			425	51	90	141	368	64	9	4	13	58
NHL totals			25	0	4	4	8	—	—	—	—	—

=== International ===
Year	Team	Event	GP	G	A	Pts	PIM
1985	Sweden	WJC	5	0	0	0	6
1992	Sweden	WC	8	4	0	4	6
1993	Sweden	WC	8	0	0	0	16
Junior totals			5	0	0	0	6
Senior totals			16	4	0	4	22
