= Jonas Bergqvist =

Swedish ice hockey player

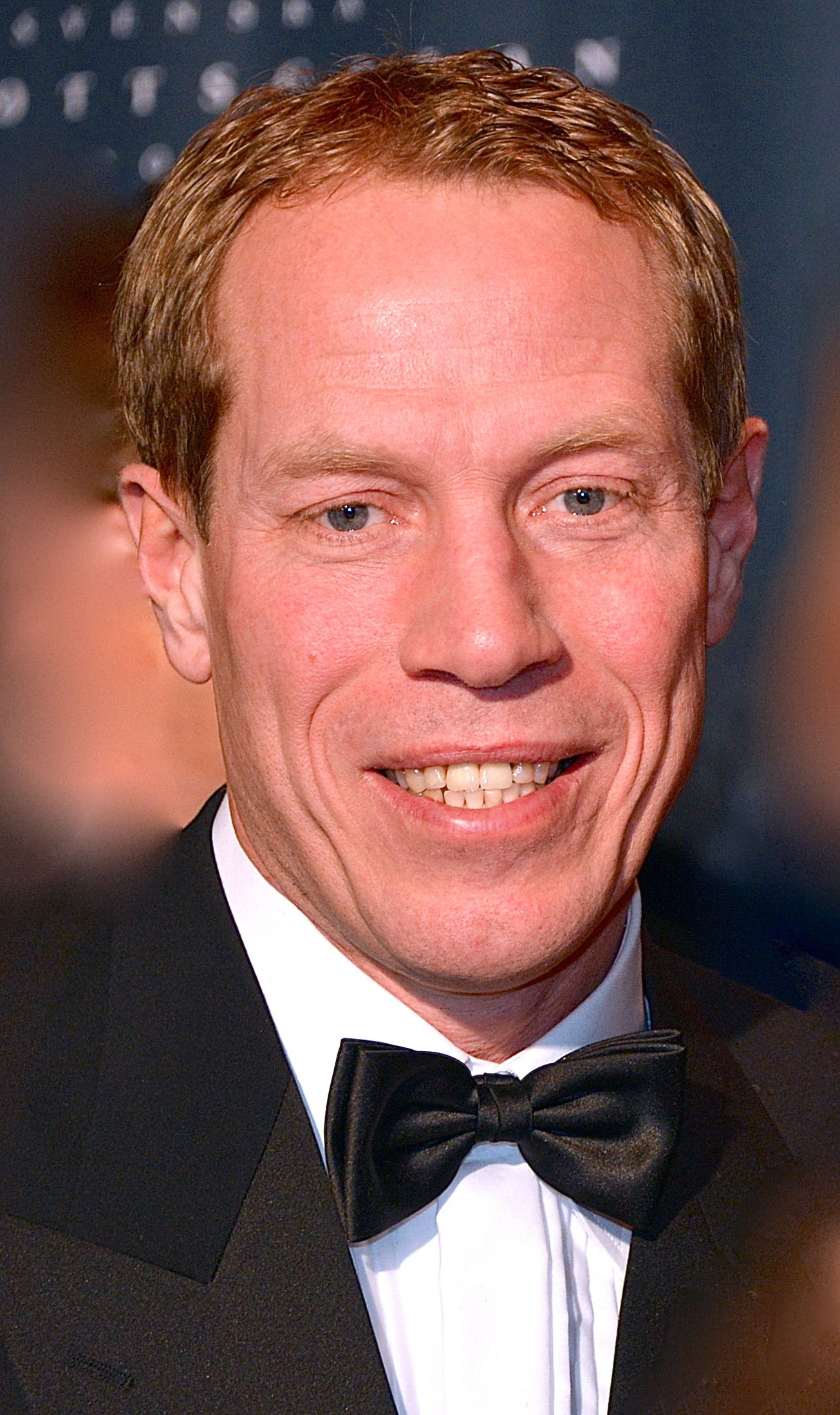
- Jonas Bergqvist at the Swedish Sports Awards inside the Stockholm Globe Arena in Stockholm, Sweden in January 2013
- Born: 26 September 1962 (age 64) Hässleholm, Sweden
- Height: 6 ft 0 in (183 cm)
- Weight: 92 kg (203 lb; 14 st 7 lb)
- Position: Right wing
- Shot: Left
- Played for: Leksands IF; Calgary Flames; Mannheimer ERC; VEU Feldkirch
- National team: Sweden
- NHL draft: 126th overall, 1988; Calgary Flames
- Playing career: 1981–1999

Jonas Pär Bergqvist (born 26 September 1962) is a Swedish former professional ice hockey right winger, who twice won an Olympic medal in his career.

== Playing career ==
Bergqvist played for Rögle BK and Leksands IF between 1981 and 1989. He played 22 games in the National Hockey League (NHL) for the Calgary Flames in 1989–90. He then played in Germany for Mannheimer ERC before returning to Leksands IF in 1991, where he played until 1998. He won the Golden Puck as the top player in Sweden in 1995–96. In 1998–99 he played for VEU Feldkirch in Austria, winning the Alpine championship.

Bergqvist held the record for games played – 272 – for the Swedish national team, prior to his record being broken by Jörgen Jönsson in 2007. He participated in nine IIHF World Championships (on the gold medal team in 1987, 1991 and 1998), the 1988 and 1994 Olympics, the 1987 and 1991 Canada Cups, and the 1996 World Cup of Hockey.

== Career statistics ==
=== Regular season and playoffs ===
			Regular season					Playoffs
Season	Team	League	GP	G	A	Pts	PIM	GP	G	A	Pts	PIM
1981–82	Leksands IF	SEL	33	6	7	13	10	—	—	—	—	—
1982–83	Leksands IF	SEL	35	8	11	19	20	—	—	—	—	—
1983–84	Leksands IF	SEL	29	11	11	22	16	—	—	—	—	—
1984–85	Leksands IF	SEL	35	11	11	22	16	—	—	—	—	—
1985–86	Leksands IF	SEL	36	16	21	37	16	—	—	—	—	—
1986–87	Leksands IF	SEL	39	9	11	20	26	—	—	—	—	—
1987–88	Leksands IF	SEL	37	19	12	31	32	3	0	0	0	0
1988–89	Leksands IF	SEL	27	15	20	35	18	10	4	3	7	2
1989–90	Calgary Flames	NHL	22	2	5	7	10	—	—	—	—	—
1989–90	Salt Lake Golden Eagles	IHL	13	6	10	16	4	—	—	—	—	—
1990–91	Mannheimer ERC	1.GBun	36	16	23	39	22	3	0	0	0	4
1991–92	Leksands IF	SEL	22	11	10	21	4	—	—	—	—	—
1992–93	Leksands IF	SEL	39	15	23	38	40	2	0	0	0	0
1993–94	Leksands IF	SEL	35	12	23	35	29	—	—	—	—	—
1994–95	Leksands IF	SEL	33	17	12	29	16	4	0	0	0	4
1995–96	Leksands IF	SEL	37	16	14	30	30	5	2	1	3	0
1996–97	Leksands IF	SEL	38	13	16	29	22	9	4	2	6	12
1997–98	Leksands IF	SEL	31	14	19	33	18	3	0	1	1	8
1998–99	VEU Feldkirch	Alpenliga	29	17	21	38	24	—	—	—	—	—
1998–99	VEU Feldkirch	AUT	17	5	5	10	4	—	—	—	—	—
SEL totals			503	193	221	414	323	36	10	7	17	26

=== International ===
Olympic medal record

Men's ice hockey
Bronze medal – third place	1988 Calgary	Team competition
Gold medal – first place	1994 Lillehammer	Team competition

World Championships
Gold medal – first place	1987 Austria	Ice hockey
Gold medal – first place	1991 Finland	Ice hockey
Gold medal – first place	1998 Switzerland	Ice hockey
Silver medal – second place	1995 Sweden	Ice hockey
Silver medal – second place	1993 Germany	Ice hockey
Silver medal – second place	1986 Soviet Union	Ice hockey
Bronze medal – third place	1994 Italy	Ice hockey

Year	Team	Event	GP	G	A	Pts	PIM
1982	Sweden	WJC	7	4	5	9	9
1986	Sweden	WC	10	4	3	7	12
1987	Sweden	WC	9	1	3	4	4
1987	Sweden	CC	6	2	0	2	4
1988	Sweden	OLY	8	3	0	3	4
1989	Sweden	WC	10	3	2	5	4
1991	Sweden	WC	9	4	2	6	8
1991	Sweden	CC	6	0	1	1	0
1993	Sweden	WC	8	3	1	4	14
1994	Sweden	OLY	8	1	3	4	4
1994	Sweden	WC	8	3	5	8	4
1995	Sweden	WC	5	1	0	1	0
1996	Sweden	WC	6	4	0	4	0
1996	Sweden	WCH	4	1	0	1	2
1998	Sweden	WC	10	2	0	2	6
Junior totals			7	4	5	9	9
Senior totals			107	32	20	52	66

== Sources ==
- A to Z Encyclopedia of Ice Hockey
- Biographical information and career statistics from NHL.com, or Eliteprospects.com, or Eurohockey.com, or Hockey-Reference.com, or The Internet Hockey Database
- Record broken by J. Jönsson

Preceded by Tomas Jonsson	Golden Puck; 1996	Succeeded by Jörgen Jönsson
