= Peter Popovic =

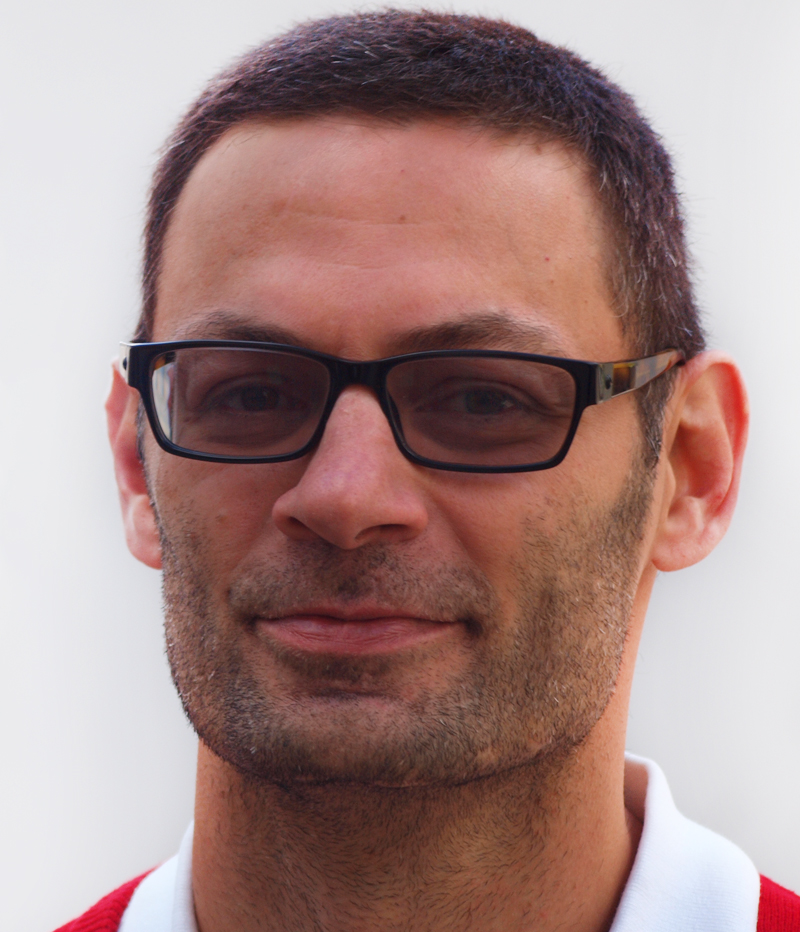
- Peter Popovic in September 2010
- Born: 10 February 1968 (age 58) Arboga, Sweden
- Height: 6 ft 5 in (196 cm)
- Weight: 231 lb (105 kg; 16 st 7 lb)
- Position: Defence
- Shot: Left
- Played for: Västerås IK; Montreal Canadiens; New York Rangers; Pittsburgh Penguins; Boston Bruins; Södertälje SK
- NHL draft: 93rd overall, 1988; Montreal Canadiens
- Playing career: 1988–2006

Peter "Poppe" Popovic (Serbian: Popović; born 10 February 1968) is a Swedish former ice hockey defenceman of Serbian ancestry, and currently an assistant coach of the Sweden men's national team. Popovic was drafted by the Montreal Canadiens in the 5th round (93rd overall) of the 1988 NHL entry draft.

== Playing career ==
Popovic began his National Hockey League career with Montreal in 1994, where he played for five seasons.

In the summer of 1998, the Canadiens traded Popovic to the New York Rangers.

After one year on Broadway, Popovic was on the move again, traded to the Pittsburgh Penguins in exchange for Kevin Hatcher in a cost-cutting movie by the Penguins. Popovic then inked a 2-year free agent deal with the Boston Bruins but played just one year there before He left the NHL after the 2001 season, having played 485 games, then played for five seasons in Södertälje SK.

== Coaching career ==
On 23 April 2009 Popovic was named the new head coach of Södertälje SK. In 2011, after Södertälje's relegation to HockeyAllsvenskan, Popovic was dismissed from the club. He has also been an assistant coach at VIK Västerås HK under Lars Ivarsson. On 14 April 2011, Popovic was named an assistant coach of Tre Kronor. In March 2026, Popovic became sporting director of VIK Västerås HK.

== Career statistics ==
=== Regular season and playoffs ===
			Regular season					Playoffs
Season	Team	League	GP	G	A	Pts	PIM	GP	G	A	Pts	PIM
1986–87	Västerås IK Hockey	SWE U20	10	0	1	1	2	—	—	—	—	—
1986–87	Västerås IK Hockey	SWE.2	24	1	2	3	10	12	2	8	10	6
1987–88	Västerås IK Hockey	SWE.2	28	3	17	20	16	15	1	4	5	20
1988–89	Västerås IK Hockey	SEL	22	1	4	5	32	—	—	—	—	—
1988–89	Västerås IK Hockey	Allsv	17	2	3	5	20	5	0	1	1	16
1989–90	Västerås IK Hockey	SEL	30	2	10	12	24	2	0	1	1	2
1990–91	Västerås IK Hockey	SEL	40	3	2	5	54	4	0	0	0	4
1991–92	Västerås IK Hockey	SEL	34	7	10	17	30	—	—	—	—	—
1992–93	Västerås IK Hockey	SEL	39	6	10	16	46	3	0	1	1	2
1993–94	Montreal Canadiens	NHL	47	2	12	14	26	6	0	1	1	0
1994–95	Västerås IK Hockey	SEL	11	0	3	3	10	—	—	—	—	—
1994–95	Montreal Canadiens	NHL	33	0	5	5	8	—	—	—	—	—
1995–96	Montreal Canadiens	NHL	79	2	12	14	69	6	0	2	2	4
1996–97	Montreal Canadiens	NHL	78	1	13	14	32	—	—	—	—	—
1997–98	Montreal Canadiens	NHL	69	2	6	8	38	10	1	1	2	2
1998–99	New York Rangers	NHL	68	1	4	5	40	—	—	—	—	—
1999–2000	Pittsburgh Penguins	NHL	54	1	5	6	30	10	0	0	0	10
2000–01	Boston Bruins	NHL	60	1	6	7	48	—	—	—	—	—
2001–02	Södertälje SK	SEL	50	3	18	21	52	—	—	—	—	—
2002–03	Södertälje SK	SEL	50	3	9	12	52	—	—	—	—	—
2003–04	Södertälje SK	SEL	49	1	9	10	61	—	—	—	—	—
2004–05	Södertälje SK	SEL	36	1	4	5	34	10	0	0	0	8
2005–06	VIK Västerås HK	SWE.2	34	3	8	11	34	—	—	—	—	—
SEL totals			361	27	79	106	395	19	0	2	2	16
NHL totals			488	10	63	73	291	32	1	4	5	16

=== International ===
Year	Team	Event	GP	G	A	Pts	PIM
1993	Sweden	WC	8	0	1	1	2
1996	Sweden	WCH	3	0	0	0	2
Senior totals			11	0	1	1	4
