= Thomas Eriksson (ice hockey) =

Swedish ice hockey player

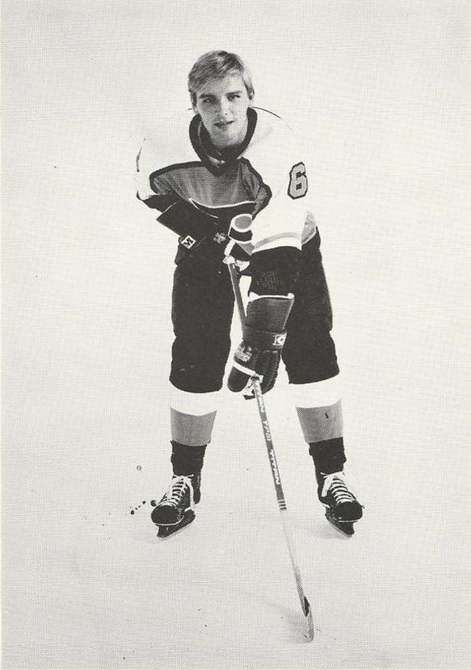
- Eriksson in 1983 photo
- Born: 16 October 1959 (age 67) Stockholm, Sweden
- Height: 6 ft 2 in (188 cm)
- Weight: 182 lb (83 kg; 13 st 0 lb)
- Position: Defence
- Shot: Left
- Played for: Djurgårdens IF; Philadelphia Flyers; Västerås IK
- National team: Sweden
- NHL draft: 98th overall, 1979; Philadelphia Flyers
- Playing career: 1977–1995
Medal record
Men's ice hockey
Bronze medal – third place	1980 Lake Placid	Team competition
Bronze medal – third place	1984 Sarajevo	Team competition
Bronze medal – third place	1988 Calgary	Team competition

Thomas Bo Eriksson (born 16 October 1959) is a Swedish former professional ice hockey player. He played defense in the National Hockey League (NHL) with the Philadelphia Flyers and the Elitserien with Djurgårdens IF and Västerås IK.

On 16 October 1983, Eriksson scored a goal 32 seconds into a game played on his birthday. It established an NHL record for the earliest goal by a player on his birthday. The record was broken in 2009 by Tim Jackman of the New York Islanders.

Djurgården has retired number 27 in his honor.

== Awards ==
- Bronze medal in Lake Placid Winter Olympic Games

== Career statistics ==
=== Regular season and playoffs ===
			Regular season					Playoffs
Season	Team	League	GP	G	A	Pts	PIM	GP	G	A	Pts	PIM
1976–77	Djurgårdens IF	SWE II	13	0	3	3	12	—	—	—	—	—
1977–78	Djurgårdens IF	SEL	25	6	4	10	30	—	—	—	—	—
1978–79	Djurgårdens IF	SEL	35	6	13	19	70	6	1	0	1	6
1979–80	Djurgårdens IF	SEL	36	12	11	23	62	—	—	—	—	—
1980–81	Philadelphia Flyers	NHL	24	1	10	11	14	7	0	2	2	6
1980–81	Maine Mariners	AHL	54	11	20	31	75	—	—	—	—	—
1981–82	Philadelphia Flyers	NHL	1	0	0	0	4	—	—	—	—	—
1981–82	Djurgårdens IF	SEL	27	7	5	12	48	—	—	—	—	—
1982–83	Djurgårdens IF	SEL	32	12	9	21	51	8	1	0	1	26
1983–84	Philadelphia Flyers	NHL	68	11	33	44	37	3	0	1	1	0
1984–85	Philadelphia Flyers	NHL	72	10	29	39	26	9	0	0	0	6
1985–86	Philadelphia Flyers	NHL	43	0	4	4	16	—	—	—	—	—
1986–87	Djurgårdens IF	SEL	34	8	11	19	64	—	—	—	—	—
1987–88	Djurgårdens IF	SEL	39	13	17	30	36	3	0	0	0	2
1988–89	Djurgårdens IF	SEL	38	6	13	19	50	8	3	3	6	20
1989–90	Djurgårdens IF	SEL	39	11	12	23	106	8	2	2	4	14
1990–91	Djurgårdens IF	SEL	39	16	11	27	62	7	3	2	5	12
1991–92	Djurgårdens IF	SEL	31	7	7	14	46	10	1	0	1	2
1992–93	Djurgårdens IF	SEL	37	7	10	17	48	6	1	2	3	4
1993–94	Djurgårdens IF	SEL	38	5	13	18	46	6	1	4	5	10
1994–95	Västerås IK	SEL	40	8	8	16	48	4	0	1	1	0
SEL totals			490	124	144	268	767	66	13	14	27	96
NHL totals			208	22	76	98	97	19	0	3	3	12

=== International ===
Year	Team	Event	GP	G	A	Pts	PIM
1979	Sweden	WJC	6	2	0	2	13
1979	Sweden	WC	7	1	1	2	6
1980	Sweden	OG	7	2	0	2	10
1981	Sweden	CC	2	0	0	0	0
1982	Sweden	WC	10	0	0	0	14
1983	Sweden	WC	10	0	1	1	12
1984	Sweden	OG	7	0	2	2	2
1984	Sweden	CC	7	0	3	3	2
1988	Sweden	OG	7	0	3	3	6
1989	Sweden	WC	8	1	1	2	8
1990	Sweden	WC	9	4	1	5	14
Senior totals			74	8	12	20	74
