= Tomas Jonsson =

Swedish ice hockey player

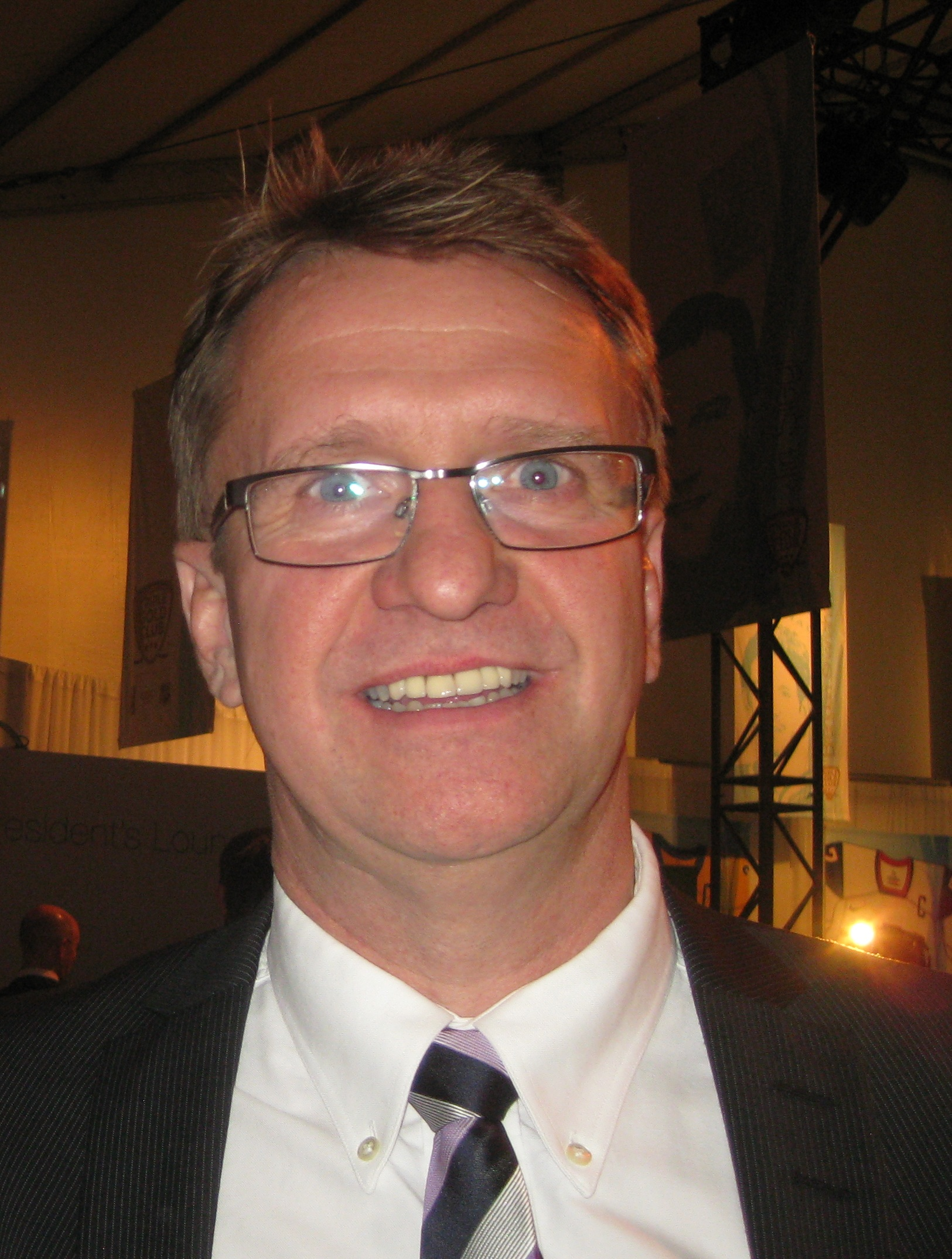
- Jonsson in February 2010
- Born: 12 April 1960 (age 66) Falun, Sweden
- Height: 5 ft 10 in (178 cm)
- Weight: 175 lb (79 kg; 12 st 7 lb)
- Position: Defence
- Shot: Left
- Played for: Modo AIK (SEL); New York Islanders (NHL); Edmonton Oilers (NHL); Leksands IF (SEL)
- National team: Sweden
- NHL draft: 25th overall, 1979; New York Islanders
- Playing career: 1977–1998

Medal record

Representing Sweden

Ice hockey

European Junior Championships
Gold medal – first place	1977 West Germany	

World Junior Championships
Silver medal – second place	1978 Canada	
Bronze medal – third place	1979 Sweden	
Bronze medal – third place	1980 Finland	

World Championships
Gold medal – first place	1991 Finland	
Silver medal – second place	1981 Sweden	
Silver medal – second place	1986 Soviet Union	
Silver medal – second place	1990 Switzerland	
Silver medal – second place	1995 Sweden	
Bronze medal – third place	1979 Soviet Union	

Olympic Games
Gold medal – first place	1994 Lillehammer	
Bronze medal – third place	1980 Lake Placid	

Alf Tomas Jonsson (born 12 April 1960) is a Swedish former professional ice hockey player. He is assistant coach for the Danish national ice hockey team.

Jonsson was drafted by the New York Islanders in the 1979 NHL entry draft in the 2nd round, the 25th overall pick. During the 1980 World Junior Championships he and Reijo Ruotsalainen were the media's selections as the best defencemen of the tournament. Jonsson made his debut for the Islanders in the 1981–82 season, winning a Stanley Cup championship with the team in his first season. The Islanders repeated as Cup champions again the following season.

Jonsson played with the Islanders until 1989, when he was traded to the Edmonton Oilers. He played with the Oilers only for the remainder of the 1988–89 season. After that he moved back to Sweden, playing with Leksands IF until 1998. He was named Swedish Player of the Year in 1994–95.

In 1994 Jonsson won an Olympic gold medal. That made him one of the first three members of the Triple Gold Club, players who have won a Stanley Cup, a World Championship and an Olympic gold medal. Jonsson was inducted into the IIHF Hall of Fame in 2000.

== Career statistics ==
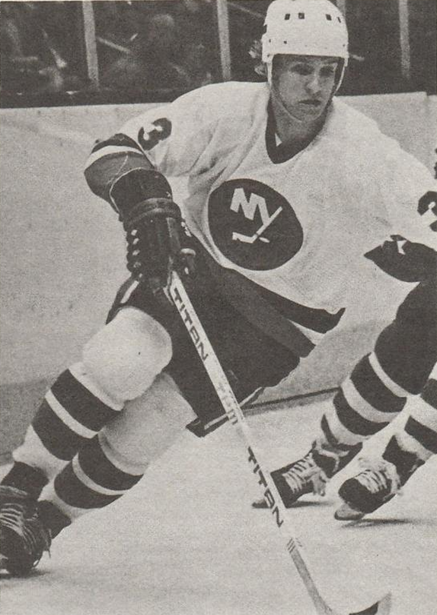
1983 photo of Jonsson for the New York Islanders

=== Regular season and playoffs ===
			Regular season					Playoffs
Season	Team	League	GP	G	A	Pts	PIM	GP	G	A	Pts	PIM
1974–75	Falu IF	SWE III	8	0	0	0	0	—	—	—	—	—
1975–76	Falu IF	SWE II	20	0	4	4	—	—	—	—	—	—
1976–77	Falu IF	SWE II	19	3	7	10	—	—	—	—	—	—
1977–78	Modo AIK	SEL	35	9	8	17	45	2	0	0	0	4
1978–79	Modo AIK	SEL	34	11	9	20	77	5	1	2	3	13
1979–80	Modo AIK	SEL	36	3	13	16	42	—	—	—	—	—
1980–81	Modo AIK	SEL	35	8	12	20	58	—	—	—	—	—
1981–82	Modo AIK	SEL	7	0	2	2	8	—	—	—	—	—
1981–82	New York Islanders	NHL	70	9	25	34	51	10	0	2	2	21
1982–83	New York Islanders	NHL	72	13	35	48	50	20	2	10	12	18
1983–84	New York Islanders	NHL	72	11	36	47	54	21	3	5	8	22
1984–85	New York Islanders	NHL	69	16	34	50	58	7	1	2	3	10
1985–86	New York Islanders	NHL	77	14	30	44	62	3	0	1	1	4
1986–87	New York Islanders	NHL	47	6	25	31	36	10	1	4	5	6
1987–88	New York Islanders	NHL	72	6	41	47	115	5	2	2	4	10
1988–89	New York Islanders	NHL	53	9	23	32	34	—	—	—	—	—
1988–89	Edmonton Oilers	NHL	20	1	10	11	22	4	2	0	2	6
1989–90	Leksands IF	SEL	40	11	15	26	54	3	1	1	2	4
1990–91	Leksands IF	SEL	22	7	7	14	16	—	—	—	—	—
1991–92	Leksands IF	SEL	22	6	7	13	26	—	—	—	—	—
1992–93	Leksands IF	SEL	38	8	15	23	90	2	1	1	2	4
1993–94	Leksands IF	SEL	33	4	14	18	38	4	0	1	1	6
1994–95	Leksands IF	SEL	37	8	17	25	38	4	1	3	4	27
1995–96	Leksands IF	SEL	34	5	17	22	24	5	0	4	4	2
1996–97	Leksands IF	SEL	38	8	13	21	42	9	2	1	3	4
1997–98	Leksands IF	SEL	38	7	10	17	34	4	0	0	0	12
1998–99	Falu IF	SWE IV	1	0	0	0	0	—	—	—	—	—
SEL totals			449	94	160	254	592	38	6	13	19	76
NHL totals			552	85	259	344	482	80	11	26	37	97

=== International ===
Year	Team	Event	GP	G	A	Pts	PIM
1977	Sweden	EJC	6	2	3	5	16
1978	Sweden	WJC	7	1	2	3	10
1979	Sweden	WJC	6	1	1	2	4
1979	Sweden	WC	8	1	3	4	8
1980	Sweden	WJC	5	2	1	3	10
1980	Sweden	OLY	7	2	2	4	6
1981	Sweden	WC	1	0	0	0	0
1981	Sweden	CC	3	0	1	1	4
1986	Sweden	WC	8	0	5	5	10
1987	Sweden	CC	6	1	1	2	2
1990	Sweden	WC	8	0	1	1	8
1991	Sweden	WC	10	0	4	4	8
1994	Sweden	OLY	8	1	3	4	10
1995	Sweden	WC	8	0	2	2	12
Junior totals			24	6	7	13	40
Senior totals			67	5	22	27	68

Preceded by Peter Forsberg	Guldpucken; 1995	Succeeded by Jonas Bergqvist
