= Peter Eriksson (ice hockey) =

Swedish ice hockey player (born 1965)

- Born: July 12, 1965 (age 60) Nässjö, Sweden
- Height: 6 ft 4 in (193 cm)
- Weight: 220 lb (100 kg; 15 st 10 lb)
- Position: Left wing
- Shot: Right
- Played for: Edmonton Oilers
- National team: Sweden
- NHL draft: 64th overall, 1987; Edmonton Oilers
- Playing career: 1985–1994

Peter Kessler Eriksson (born July 12, 1965 in Kramfors, Sweden) is a retired Swedish professional ice hockey left winger.

He played for HV71 Jönköping in the Swedish elite league Elitserien from 1985–1989 before joining the Edmonton Oilers of the National Hockey League for the 1989–90 season. He played 20 games for the NHL club, scoring 3 goals and 3 assists. He also spent part of the season playing for the Oilers' minor league affiliate, the Cape Breton Oilers. He returned to Sweden at the end of the season and played four more years with HV71.

Eriksson played for the Swedish national team several times in his career, including the 1987 Canada Cup, the 1988 Winter Olympics, where he was part of the bronze medal winning team, and the 1989 World Ice Hockey Championships.

== Career statistics ==
=== Regular season and playoffs ===
			Regular season					Playoffs
Season	Team	League	GP	G	A	Pts	PIM	GP	G	A	Pts	PIM
1983–84	Boro/Vetlanda	SWE III	32	17	12	29	—	—	—	—	—	—
1984–85	HV71	SWE II	10	5	2	7	2	—	—	—	—	—
1985–86	HV71	SEL	30	7	8	15	18	1	0	0	0	0
1986–87	HV71	SEL	36	14	5	19	16	—	—	—	—	—
1987–88	HV71	SEL	37	14	9	23	20	2	1	0	1	0
1988–89	HV71	SEL	40	10	27	37	48	3	1	2	3	0
1989–90	Edmonton Oilers	NHL	20	3	3	6	24	—	—	—	—	—
1989–90	Cape Breton Oilers	AHL	21	5	12	17	36	5	2	2	4	2
1990–91	HV71	SEL	35	15	7	22	58	2	1	0	1	2
1991–92	HV71	SEL	34	10	12	22	28	3	1	0	1	0
1992–93	HV71	SEL	40	16	15	31	40	—	—	—	—	—
1993–94	HV71	SEL	38	6	7	13	34	—	—	—	—	—
1994–95	IF Troja/Ljungby	SWE II	36	16	10	26	34	8	3	2	5	10
1995–96	IF Troja/Ljungby	SWE II	31	20	10	30	20	8	2	2	4	12
1996–97	IF Troja/Ljungby	SWE II	29	11	20	31	56	9	4	2	6	6
1997–98	Nürnberg Ice Tigers	DEL	28	3	2	5	26	4	0	2	2	27
SWE II totals			106	52	42	94	112	25	9	6	15	28
SEL totals			290	92	90	182	262	11	4	2	6	2

=== International ===
Olympic medal record

Men's ice hockey
Bronze medal – third place	1988 Calgary	Team

Year	Team	Event	GP	G	A	Pts	PIM
1987	Sweden	CC	3	0	0	0	0
1988	Sweden	OG	3	0	1	1	0
1989	Sweden	WC	7	0	1	1	8
Senior totals			13	0	2	2	8
