= Pär Djoos =

Swedish ice hockey player (born 1968)

Per Djoos
- Born: May 11, 1968 (age 58) Mora, Sweden
- Height: 6 ft 0 in (183 cm)
- Weight: 198 lb (90 kg; 14 st 2 lb)
- Position: Defence
- Shot: Right
- Played for: Brynäs IF; Västra Frölunda HC; Detroit Red Wings; New York Rangers; HC Lugano
- National team: Sweden
- NHL draft: 127th overall, 1986; Detroit Red Wings
- Playing career: 1984–2003

Per Olov Johan Djoos (born May 11, 1968) is a Swedish former ice hockey defenceman who played for the Detroit Red Wings and the New York Rangers of the National Hockey League (NHL) between 1990 and 1993. He most recently played in the Elitserien for Brynäs IF. He is currently coaching IF Sundsvall in the Swedish Allsvenskan. He is the father of former Detroit Red Wings defenseman Christian Djoos.

Djoos was drafted in the 7th round (127th overall) by Detroit in the 1986 NHL entry draft.

== Professional career ==
Djoos grew up playing hockey for his hometown team in Sweden. His solid defensive play earned him local fame and looks from pro scouts. Djoos was drafted in 1986 by the Detroit Red Wings while still playing on his local hockey team. The Red Wings organization felt it best for him to gain more experience in Sweden before coming to America, and so Djoos remained in Sweden.

He was called up to Brynäs IF of the Swedish Elite League in 1988 and remained with the team for two seasons, scoring 18 points each season. The Red Wings wanted to see how his skills would translate into the North American game and so Djoos was brought over to America for the 1990–91 season. He ended up playing for the Adirondack Red Wings of the American Hockey League, but only managed to play 20 games before being called up to the big leagues. Djoos played 26 games for the injury ridden Red Wings, before being traded on March 5, 1991. Djoos was traded, along with Joe Kocur, to the New York Rangers for Kevin Miller, Jim Cummins and Dennis Vial, where he was sent to the Rangers' minor league club, the Binghamton Rangers, for the remainder of the season. Djoos helped lead Binghamton into the playoffs, eventually losing in the semi-finals.

In the 1991–92 season, Djoos played 50 games for the New York Rangers, picking up one goal and 40 penalty minutes. The following season, Djoos found himself back in the minors with Binghamton, where he had his best season to date, scoring 16 goals and 53 assists in 70 games. He also added 10 points in Binghamton's short playoff run. Djoos would also see his last of the NHL in the 1992–93 season, when he was called up to New York for six games, scoring one goal and one assist in that span.

== International play ==
After finishing his career in North America, Djoos headed back across the Atlantic to play for Lugano of the Nationalliga A. Djoos again had a great season and helped Lugano in their short playoff run with 7 assists.

1994–95 would see Djoos back in the SEL playing for Västra Frölunda HC Göteborg. He would spend two short seasons with Frölunda before returning to his old team, Brynäs. Djoos would finish out his career with Brynäs, having his best season with them in 1998–99 when Djoos contributed five goals and 43 assists to lead the team in defensive scoring. Djoos retired after the 2002–03 season after seven seasons with the club.

== Career statistics ==
=== Regular season and playoffs ===
			Regular season					Playoffs
Season	Team	League	GP	G	A	Pts	PIM	GP	G	A	Pts	PIM
1984–85	Mora IK	SWE-2	20	2	3	5	2	—	—	—	—	—
1985–86	Mora IK	SWE-2	30	9	5	14	14	2	0	0	0	2
1986–87	Brynäs IF	SEL	23	1	2	3	16	—	—	—	—	—
1987–88	Brynäs IF	SEL	34	4	11	15	18	—	—	—	—	—
1988–89	Brynäs IF	SEL	40	1	17	18	44	5	0	1	1	0
1989–90	Brynäs IF	SEL	37	5	13	18	36	5	1	5	6	6
1990–91	Detroit Red Wings	NHL	26	0	12	12	16	—	—	—	—	—
1990–91	Adirondack Red Wings	AHL	20	2	9	11	6	—	—	—	—	—
1990–91	Binghamton Rangers	AHL	14	1	8	9	10	9	2	2	4	4
1991–92	New York Rangers	NHL	50	1	18	19	40	—	—	—	—	—
1992–93	New York Rangers	NHL	6	1	1	2	2	—	—	—	—	—
1992–93	Binghamton Rangers	AHL	70	16	53	69	75	14	2	8	10	8
1993–94	HC Lugano	NDA	36	11	23	34	33	9	0	7	7	4
1994–95	Västra Frölunda HC	SEL	22	5	4	9	12	—	—	—	—	—
1994–95	Västra Frölunda HC	Allsv	11	1	7	8	4	—	—	—	—	—
1995–96	Västra Frölunda HC	SEL	9	0	2	2	2	—	—	—	—	—
1995–96	Södertälje SK	SWE.2	8	1	1	2	27	—	—	—	—	—
1996–97	Brynäs IF	SEL	50	3	15	18	74	—	—	—	—	—
1997–98	Brynäs IF	SEL	44	9	23	32	40	3	0	1	1	2
1998–99	Brynäs IF	SEL	50	5	43	48	56	14	1	12	13	6
1999–00	Brynäs IF	SEL	48	5	23	28	40	11	1	5	6	20
2000–01	Brynäs IF	SEL	43	2	17	19	44	4	0	2	2	6
2001–02	Brynäs IF	SEL	18	2	7	9	28	4	0	1	1	4
2002–03	Brynäs IF	SEL	14	0	6	6	8	—	—	—	—	—
SEL totals			432	42	183	225	418	46	3	27	30	44
NHL totals			82	2	31	33	58	—	—	—	—	—

=== International ===
Year	Team	Event	GP	G	A	Pts	PIM
1986	Sweden	EJC	5	2	4	6	2
1988	Sweden	WJC	7	0	2	2	4
1990	Sweden	WC	7	1	0	1	10
1999	Sweden	WC	10	2	3	5	0
Junior totals			12	2	6	8	6
Senior totals			17	3	3	6	10
