= Mats Kihlström =

Swedish ice hockey player (born 1964)

Medal record

Representing Sweden

Men's Ice Hockey
Bronze medal – third place	1988 Calgary	Team

Mats Bernhard Kihlström (born January 3, 1964, in Ludvika) is an ice hockey player who played for the Swedish national team. He won a bronze medal at the 1988 Winter Olympics. He played for Södertälje SK and Brynäs IF throughout his career and he played 147 matches for the Swedish national team he won a silver medal at the 1986 World Championships.

== Career statistics ==
=== Regular season and playoffs ===
			Regular season					Playoffs
Season	Team	League	GP	G	A	Pts	PIM	GP	G	A	Pts	PIM
1981–82	Södertälje SK	SWE II	25	2	3	5	20	10	1	0	1	2
1982–83	Södertälje SK	SWE II	28	6	3	9	47	3	0	2	2	8
1983–84	Södertälje SK	SEL	25	4	4	8	25	3	1	0	1	0
1984–85	Brynäs IF	SEL	35	4	9	13	14	—	—	—	—	—
1985–86	Brynäs IF	SEL	35	3	8	11	48	3	1	0	1	4
1986–87	Södertälje SK	SEL	35	2	4	6	28	—	—	—	—	—
1987–88	Södertälje SK	SEL	37	5	7	12	36	2	0	2	2	0
1988–89	Södertälje SK	SEL	39	3	18	21	45	5	1	5	6	4
1989–90	Södertälje SK	SEL	37	7	15	22	26	2	0	1	1	2
1990–91	Södertälje SK	SEL	29	4	10	14	40	2	0	1	1	0
1991–92	Södertälje SK	SEL	19	1	4	5	10	—	—	—	—	—
1991–92	Södertälje SK	Allsv	18	3	8	11	20	8	2	2	4	10
1992–93	Södertälje SK	SWE II	16	6	6	12	16	1	0	0	0	0
SWE II totals			69	14	12	26	83	14	1	2	3	10
SEL totals			291	33	79	112	272	17	3	9	12	10

=== International ===
Year	Team	Event	GP	G	A	Pts	PIM
1981	Sweden	EJC	5	1	2	3	4
1982	Sweden	EJC	3	1	0	1	6
1983	Sweden	WJC	7	2	0	2	4
1984	Sweden	WJC	5	1	2	3	14
1985	Sweden	WC	7	1	2	3	4
1986	Sweden	WC	10	5	0	5	16
1987	Sweden	WC	9	2	3	5	12
1988	Sweden	OG	8	1	2	3	4
1989	Sweden	WC	8	0	0	0	2
Junior totals			20	5	4	9	28
Senior totals			42	9	7	16	38
