= Ulf Sandström (ice hockey) =

Swedish ice hockey player

Medal record

Men's ice hockey
Bronze medal – third place	1988 Calgary	Team competition

Ulf Hendry Sandström (born 24 April 1967 in Härnösand, Sweden) is a retired Swedish ice hockey player.

Among the clubs he played for are Bodens IK, Luleå HF and Modo Hockey. He has also appeared 47 times in the Swedish national ice hockey team, and participated in 1988 Winter Olympics, where the team took the bronze medal.

Sandström was drafted by the Chicago Blackhawks in the 5th round of the 1987 NHL entry draft, as 92nd overall.

A tragic bicycle accident has left Sandström paralyzed from the waist down.

== Career statistics ==
=== Regular season and playoffs ===
			Regular season					Playoffs
Season	Team	League	GP	G	A	Pts	PIM	GP	G	A	Pts	PIM
1986–87	Modo AIK	SEL	25	2	4	6	14	—	—	—	—	—
1987–88	Modo AIK	SEL	38	26	9	35	12	4	2	1	3	4
1988–89	Modo AIK	SEL	39	19	14	33	16	—	—	—	—	—
1989–90	Modo AIK	SEL	18	6	4	10	2	—	—	—	—	—
1989–90	Modo AIK	Allsv	18	7	7	14	6	6	0	2	2	0
1990–91	Luleå HF	SEL	37	4	5	9	4	5	1	0	1	0
1991–92	Luleå HF	SEL	40	4	4	8	8	2	0	0	0	0
1993–94	Bodens IK	SWE II	35	26	10	36	46	—	—	—	—	—
1994–95	Bodens IK	SWE II	35	17	16	33	14	—	—	—	—	—
1995–96	Bodens IK	SWE II	31	23	12	35	6	—	—	—	—	—
1996–97	KalPa	Liiga	32	7	11	18	6	—	—	—	—	—
1996–97	Tappara	Liiga	18	1	2	3	8	3	0	0	0	0
1997–98	Bodens IK	SWE II	27	15	9	24	20	—	—	—	—	—
SEL totals			197	61	40	101	56	11	3	1	4	4
SWE II totals			128	81	47	128	86	—	—	—	—	—

=== International ===
Year	Team	Event	GP	G	A	Pts	PIM
1985	Sweden	EJC	5	3	1	4	—
1987	Sweden	WJC	7	3	1	4	0
1988	Sweden	OG	7	3	2	5	2
