= List of Djurgårdens IF (men's ice hockey) players selected in the NHL entry draft =

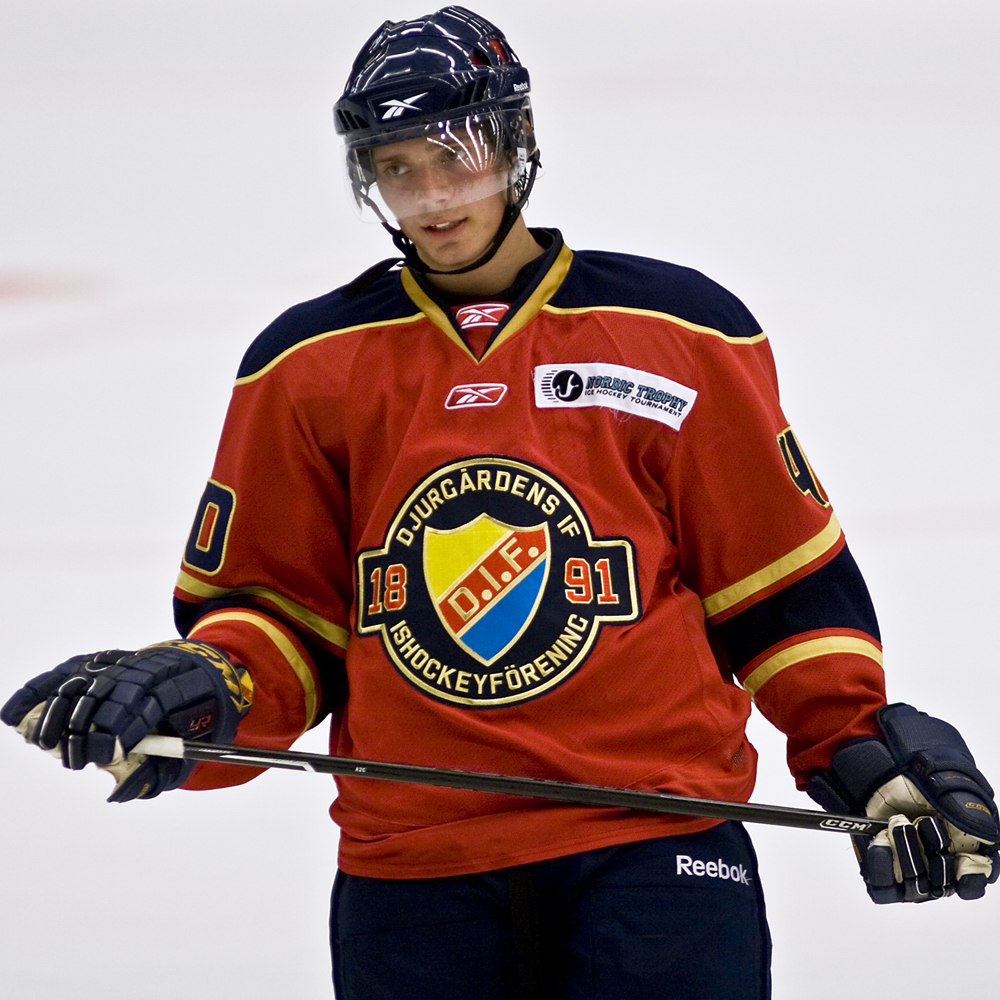
Jacob Josefson, drafted in the 2009 NHL entry draft, 1st round, 20th overall by the New Jersey Devils.

This is a list of drafted Djurgårdens IF players, players who have been drafted in the National Hockey League (NHL) Entry Draft and played the season prior to the draft for the Djurgården ice hockey organization. There have been 84 players drafted in the NHL Entry Draft from the Djurgården organisation. In 2010, the club was ranked second in Sweden and fourth in Europe in number of drafted players. The first Djurgården player to be picked was Sören Johansson in the 1974 NHL amateur draft, he was also the third Swede overall to be picked in an NHL draft.

== Drafted players ==
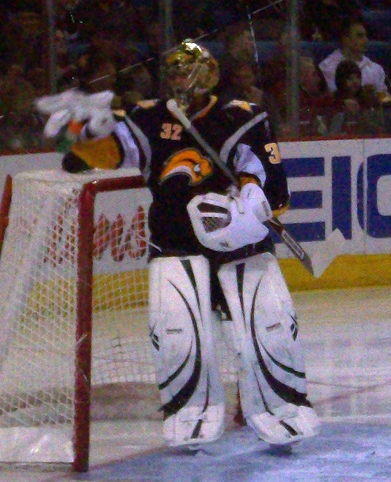
Mikael Tellqvist, drafted in the 2000 NHL entry draft, 3rd round, 70th overall by the Toronto Maple Leafs.

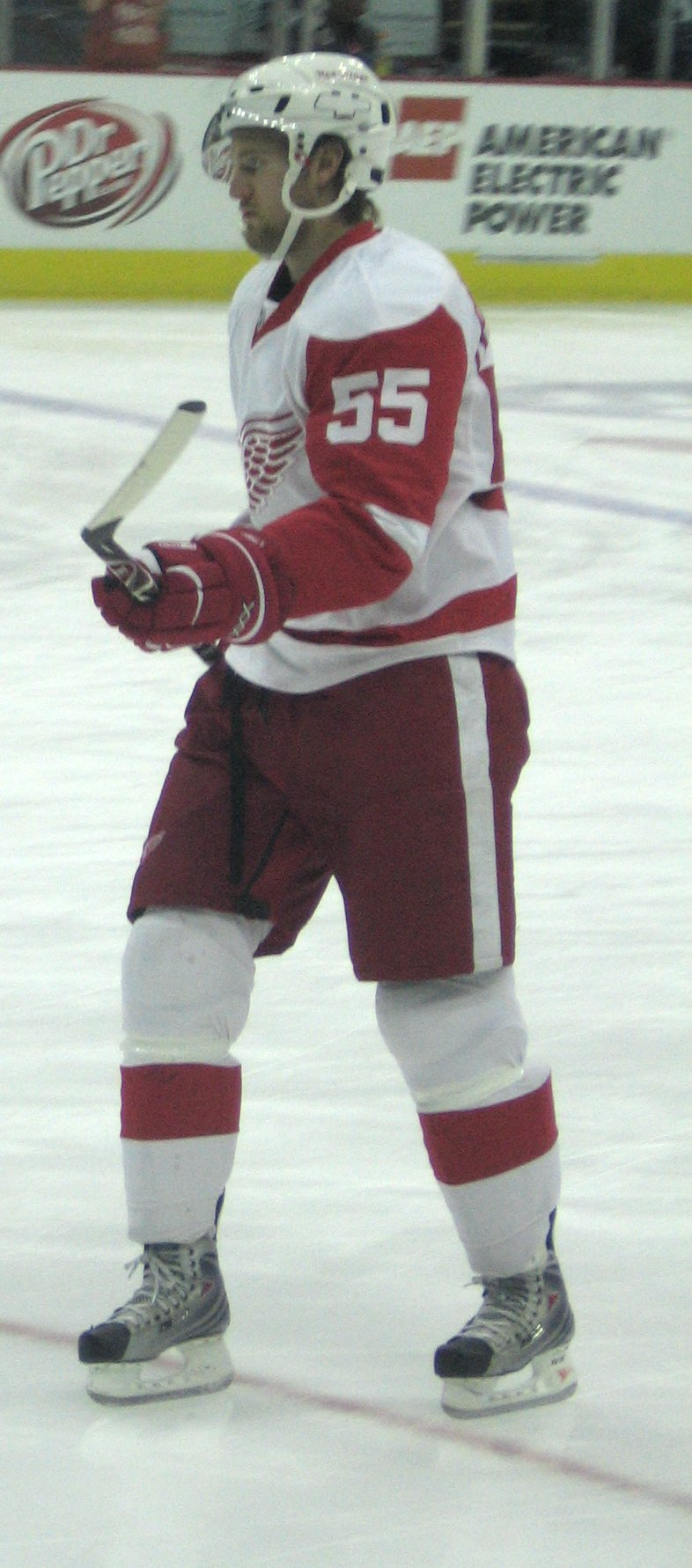
Niklas Kronwall, drafted in the 2000 NHL entry draft, 1st round, 29th overall by the Detroit Red Wings.

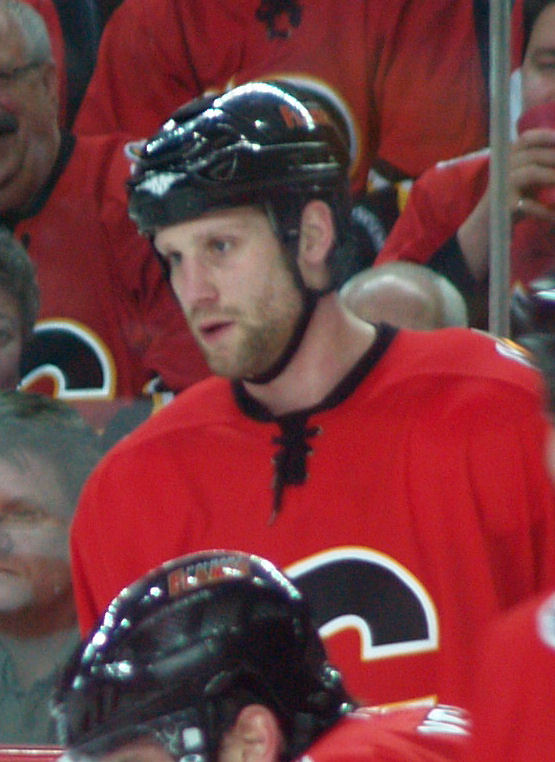
Marcus Nilson, drafted in the 1997 NHL entry draft, 1st round, 20th overall by the Florida Panthers. His son Eric was drafted in the 2025 NHL entry draft, 2nd round, 45th overall by the Anaheim Ducks.

(Note: Position; G—Goaltender, D—Defenceman, C—Centre, LW—Left wing, RW—Right wing)	Player	Nationality	Drafted by	Year	Round	Overall
RW	Sören Johansson	Sweden	Kansas City Scouts	1974	11th	177th
C	Kent Nilsson	Sweden	Atlanta Flames	1976	4th	64th
D	Thomas Eriksson	Sweden	Philadelphia Flyers	1979	5th	98th
D	Michael Thelvén	Sweden	Boston Bruins	1980	9th	186th
LW	Jens Öhling	Sweden	Boston Bruins	1980	10th	207th
F	Martin Linse	Sweden	Hartford Whalers	1982	11th	214th
D	Tommy Albelin	Sweden	Quebec Nordiques	1983	8th	152nd
F	Bo Berglund	Sweden	Quebec Nordiques	1983	12th	232nd
D	Orwar Stambert	Sweden	Buffalo Sabres	1984	8th	165th
D	Arto Blomsten	Sweden	Winnipeg Jets	1986	12th	239th
F	Tomaz Eriksson	Sweden	Philadelphia Flyers	1987	4th	83rd
G	Hans-Göran Elo	Sweden	Winnipeg Jets	1987	12th	247th
D	Kenneth Kennholt	Sweden	Calgary Flames	1989	12th	252nd
G	Tommy Söderström	Sweden	Philadelphia Flyers	1990	11th	214th
RW	Fredrik Lindquist	Sweden	New Jersey Devils	1991	3rd	55th
C	Mikael Johansson	Sweden	Quebec Nordiques	1991	7th	134th
D	Marcus Ragnarsson	Sweden	San Jose Sharks	1992	5th	99th
G	Jonas Forsberg	Sweden	San Jose Sharks	1993	9th	210th
RW	Niklas Anger	Sweden	Montreal Canadiens	1995	5th	112th
RW	Per Eklund	Sweden	Detroit Red Wings	1995	7th	182nd
D	Fredrik Lovén	Sweden	Winnipeg Jets	1995	8th	189th
RW	Marcus Nilson	Sweden	Florida Panthers	1996	1st	20th
D	Ola Sandberg	Sweden	New York Rangers	1996	6th	158th
C	Michael Holmqvist	Sweden	Mighty Ducks of Anaheim	1997	1st	18th
D	Henrik Petré	Sweden	Washington Capitals	1997	6th	143rd
RW	Jimmie Ölvestad	Sweden	Tampa Bay Lightning	1999	3rd	88th
D	Niklas Kronwall	Sweden	Detroit Red Wings	2000	1st	29th
G	Mikael Tellqvist	Sweden	Toronto Maple Leafs (Note: Pick traded from the Tampa Bay Lightnings to the Toronto Maple Leafs)	2000	3rd	70th
RW	Kristofer Ottosson	Sweden	New York Islanders (Note: Pick traded from the Carolina Hurricanes through the Philadelphia Flyers to the New York Islanders.)	2000	5th	148th
D	Björn Nord	Sweden	Washington Capitals (Note: Pick traded from the Calgary Flames to the Washington Capitals.)	2000	9th	289th
LW	Andreas Salomonsson	Sweden	New Jersey Devils	2001	5th	163rd
D	Daniel Fernholm	Sweden	Pittsburgh Penguins	2002	4th	101st
RW	Nicklas Eckerblom	Sweden	Minnesota Wild	2002	7th	204th
LW	Johannes Salmonsson	Sweden	Pittsburgh Penguins	2004	2nd	31st
G	Björn Bjurling	Sweden	Edmonton Oilers	2004	9th	274th
C	Christofer Löfberg	Sweden	Detroit Red Wings	2005	3rd	80th
G	Stefan Ridderwall	Sweden	New York Islanders (Note: Pick traded from the San Jose Sharks to the New York Islanders.)	2006	6th	173rd
D	Alexander Deilert	Sweden	Calgary Flames	2008	7th	198th
C	Jacob Josefson	Sweden	New Jersey Devils (Note: Pick traded on June 26, 2009 from the Calgary Flames to the New Jersey Devils for a first-round pick (Tim Erixon) and a third-round pick (Nicolas Deslauriers) in 2009 to Calgary in exchange for this pick.)	2009	1st	20th
D	Alexander Urbom	Sweden	New Jersey Devils (Note: Pick traded on June 20, 2008 from the Minnesota Wild to the New Jersey Devils for a first-round pick in the 2008 NHL entry draft to Minnesota in exchange for a first-round pick in 2008 and this pick.)	2009	3rd	73rd
C	Marcus Krüger	Sweden	Chicago Blackhawks	2009	5th	149th
RW	Patrick Cehlin	Sweden	Nashville Predators (Note: Pick traded on June 27, 2009 from Tampa Bay Lightning to Nashville Predators for a fifth-round pick (Michael Zador) in the 2009 NHL entry draft to Tampa Bay in exchange for this pick.)	2010	5th	126th
RW	Daniel Brodin	Sweden	Toronto Maple Leafs	2010	5th	146th
C	Mika Zibanejad	Sweden	Ottawa Senators	2011	1st	6th
LW	Ludwig Blomstrand	Sweden	Vancouver Canucks	2011	4th	120th
D	Fredrik Claesson	Sweden	Ottawa Senators	2011	5th	126th
LW	Pontus Åberg	Sweden	Nashville Predators (Note: Pick traded on June 15, 2012 from Tampa Bay Lightning to Nashville Predators for Anders Lindbäck, Kyle Wilson and a seventh-round pick in 2012 to the Tampa Bay Lightning in exchange for Sébastien Caron, Philadelphia's second-round pick in 2012, a third-round pick in 2013 and this pick.)	2012	2nd	37th
D	Erik Gustafsson	Sweden	Edmonton Oilers	2012	4th	93rd
LW	Alexander Wennberg	Sweden	Columbus Blue Jackets	2013	1st	14th
D	Linus Arnesson	Sweden	Boston Bruins	2013	2nd	60th
RW	Tobias Lindberg	Sweden	Ottawa Senators	2013	4th	102nd
D	Robin Norell	Sweden	Chicago Blackhawks	2013	4th	111th
D	Andreas Englund	Sweden	Ottawa Senators	2014	2nd	40th
G	Linus Söderström	Sweden	New York Islanders	2014	4th	95th
D	Adam Ollas Mattsson	Sweden	Calgary Flames (Note: The Anaheim Ducks' sixth-round pick went to the Calgary Flames as the result of a trade on November 21, 2013 that sent Tim Jackman to Anaheim in exchange for this pick.)	2014	6th	175th
C	Lukas Vejdemo	Sweden	Montreal Canadiens	2015	3rd	87th
RW	Daniel Bernhardt	Sweden	New York Rangers	2015	4th	119th
LW	Axel Jonsson-Fjällby	Sweden	Washington Capitals	2016	5th	147th
G	Filip Larsson	Sweden	Detroit Red Wings	2016	6th	167th
D	David Bernhardt	Sweden	New York Rangers	2016	7th	199th
C	Marcus Davidsson	Sweden	Buffalo Sabres	2017	2nd	37th
RW	Jonathan Davidsson	Sweden	Columbus Blue Jackets (Note: The New York Islanders' sixth-round pick went to the Columbus Blue Jackets as the result of a trade on June 23, 2017 that sent Brandon Saad, Anton Forsberg and a fifth-round pick in 2018 to Chicago in exchange for Artemi Panarin, Tyler Motte and this pick. Chicago previously acquired this pick as the result of a trade on June 25, 2016 that sent Columbus' fourth-round pick in 2016 to New York in exchange for a fourth-round pick in 2016 and this pick.)	2017	6th	170th
RW	Erik Walli-Walterholm	Sweden	Arizona Coyotes	2017	7th	190th
G	Olof Lindbom	Sweden	New York Rangers	2018	2nd	39th
D	Axel Andersson	Sweden	Boston Bruins	2018	2nd	57th
D	Simon Johansson	Sweden	Minnesota Wild	2018	5th	148th
D	Tobias Björnfot	Sweden	Los Angeles Kings (Note: The Toronto Maple Leafs' first-round pick went to the Los Angeles Kings as the result of a trade on January 28, 2019 that sent Jake Muzzin to Toronto in exchange for Carl Grundström, Sean Durzi and this pick.)	2019	1st	22nd
RW	Albin Grewe	Sweden	Detroit Red Wings	2019	3rd	66th
RW	Alexander Holtz	Sweden	New Jersey Devils	2020	1st	7th
LW	William Eklund	Sweden	San Jose Sharks	2021	1st	7th
C	Oskar Jellvik	Sweden	Boston Bruins	2021	5th	149th
G	Carl Lindbom	Sweden	Vegas Golden Knights	2021	7th	222nd
RW	Jonathan Lekkerimäki	Sweden	Vancouver Canucks	2022	1st	15th
C	Noah Östlund	Sweden	Buffalo Sabres (Note: The Vegas Golden Knights' first-round pick went to the Buffalo Sabres as the result of a trade on November 4, 2021, that sent Jack Eichel and a conditional third-round pick in 2023 to Vegas in exchange for Alex Tuch, Peyton Krebs, a conditional second-round pick in 2023 and this pick (being conditional at the time of the trade). The condition – Buffalo will receive a first-round pick in 2022 if Vegas' first-round pick is outside of the top ten selections – was converted when the Golden Knights did not win either draw in the 2022 draft lottery on May 10, 2022.)	2022	1st	16th
LW	Liam Öhgren	Sweden	Minnesota Wild (Note: The Los Angeles Kings' first-round pick went to the Minnesota Wild as the result of a trade on June 29, 2022, that sent Kevin Fiala to Los Angeles in exchange for Brock Faber and this pick.)	2022	1st	19th
D	Calle Odelius	Sweden	New York Islanders (Note: The Colorado Avalanche's second-round pick went to the New York Islanders as the result of a trade on October 12, 2020, that sent Devon Toews to Colorado in exchange for a second-round pick in 2021 and this pick.)	2022	2nd	65th
LW	Vilmer Alriksson	Sweden	Vancouver Canucks	2023	4th	107th
C	Linus Eriksson	Sweden	Florida Panthers (Note: The Boston Bruins' second-round pick went to the Florida Panthers as the result of a trade on June 29, 2024, that sent a second-round pick in 2025 and a seventh-round pick in 2024 (225th overall) to Toronto in exchange for this pick.)	2024	2nd	58th
C	Anton Frondell	Sweden	Chicago Blackhawks	2025	1st	3rd
RW	Victor Eklund	Sweden	New York Islanders (Note: The Calgary Flames' first-round pick went to the New York Islanders as the result of a trade on June 27, 2025, that sent Noah Dobson to Montreal in exchange for Emil Heineman, a first-round pick in 2025 (17th overall) and this pick. Montreal previously acquired this pick as the result of a trade on August 18, 2022, that sent future considerations to Calgary in exchange for Sean Monahan and this pick (being conditional at the time of the trade). The condition – Montreal will receive a first-round pick in 2025 if Calgary's first-round pick in 2024 is inside of the top nineteen selections, Calgary acquires Florida's first-round pick in 2025 and both selections are outside of the top ten, then Montreal will receive the higher of Calgary's or Florida's first-round picks in 2025 – was converted when the Flames did not win either draw in the 2025 NHL entry draft lottery draw on May 5, 2025.)	2025	1st	16th
C	Eric Nilson	Sweden	Anaheim Ducks (Note: The Columbus Blue Jackets' second-round pick went to the Anaheim Ducks as the result of a trade on June 23, 2025, that sent Trevor Zegras to Philadelphia in exchange for Ryan Poehling, a fourth-round pick in 2026 and this pick. Philadelphia previously acquired this pick as the result of a trade on June 6, 2023, that sent Kevin Connauton to Columbus in exchange for Los Angeles' first-round pick in 2023 and this pick (being conditional at the time of the trade). The condition – Philadelphia will receive a second-round pick in 2024 or 2025, at the Blue Jackets' choice – was converted on June 29, 2024, when Columbus elected to keep their second-round pick in 2024.)	2025	2nd	45th
C	Theo Stockselius	Sweden	Calgary Flames (Note: The Colorado Avalanche's second-round pick went to the Calgary Flames as the result of a trade on June 27, 2024, that sent Andrew Mangiapane to Washington in exchange for this pick. Washington previously acquired this pick as the result of a trade on February 23, 2023, that sent Lars Eller to Colorado in exchange for this pick.)	2025	2nd	54th
C	Wilson Björck	Sweden	Vancouver Canucks	2025	5th	143rd
RW	Arvid Drott	Sweden	Florida Panthers	2025	6th	192nd
C	Viggo Björck	Sweden	Winnipeg Jets	2026	1st	8th
LW	Marcus Nordmark	Sweden	Anaheim Ducks	2026	1st	28th
