= Mikael Johansson (ice hockey, born 1966) =

Swedish ice hockey player and coach

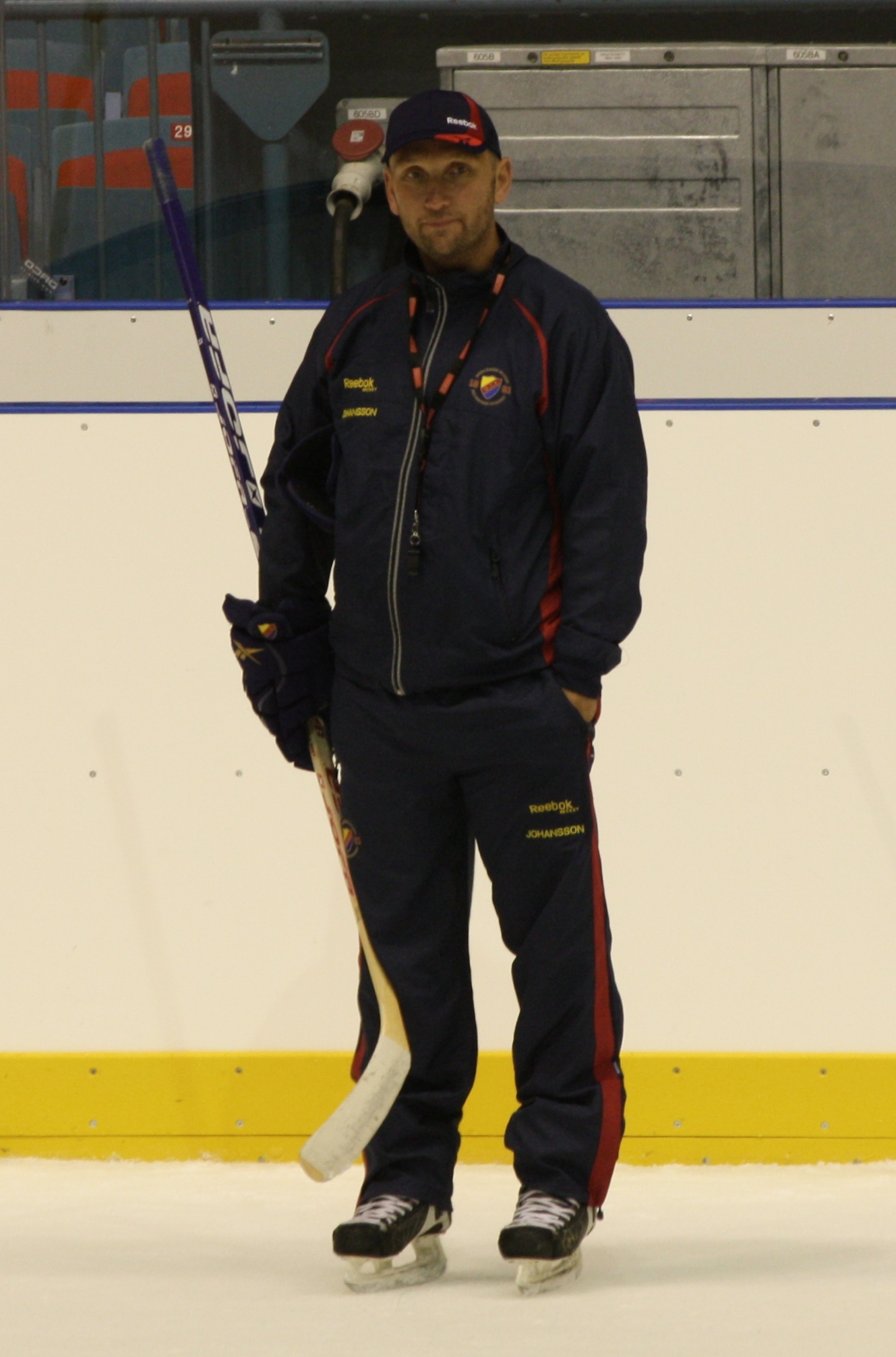
- Mikael Johansson in August 2011
- Born: 12 June 1966 (age 58); Huddinge, Sweden
- Height: 5 ft 10 in (178 cm)
- Weight: 192 lb (87 kg; 13 st 10 lb)
- Position: Centre
- Shot: Left
- Played for: Elitserien; Djurgårdens IF; NLA; EHC Kloten
- National team: Sweden
- NHL draft: 134th overall, 1991; Quebec Nordiques
- Playing career: 1985–2005

Mikael Arne Johansson (born 12 June 1966) is a Swedish retired professional ice hockey player and coach.

== Career ==
Johansson started his career at Huddinge IK, but moved to Djurgårdens IF in 1985. Johansson and his team won the Swedish championship in 1989, 1990 and 1991. He was drafted by Quebec Nordiques in the seventh round of the 1991 NHL Entry Draft, 134th overall. Johansson moved to EHC Kloten of the Swiss National League A in 1992 and won four Swiss championships before moving back to Sweden and Djurgården again in 1997. He has since his stay at EHC Kloten been included in the club's Hall of Fame and his number has been retired. Djurgården and Johansson won two more Swedish Championships in 2000 and 2001. He retired from professional hockey in 2005. Johansson's number 25 was retired in Djurgården on 15 February 2007. Johansson is the younger brother of fellow hockey player and head coach Kent Johansson. He was assistant coach for Djurgårdens IF from 2008 to 2012, but he was fired along with head coach Hardy Nilsson in January 2012.

== Career statistics ==
=== Regular season and playoffs ===
			Regular season					Playoffs
Season	Team	League	GP	G	A	Pts	PIM	GP	G	A	Pts	PIM
1982–83	Huddinge IK	Swe-2	2	0	1	1	0	—	—	—	—	—
1983–84	Huddinge IK	Swe-2	25	13	15	28	2	—	—	—	—	—
1984–85	Huddinge IK	Swe-2	31	15	17	32	16	—	—	—	—	—
1985–86	Djurgårdens IF	SEL	21	2	8	10	4	—	—	—	—	—
1986–87	Djurgårdens IF	SEL	32	9	17	26	8	2	0	0	0	2
1987–88	Djurgårdens IF	SEL	38	11	22	33	10	3	1	1	2	0
1988–89	Djurgårdens IF	SEL	29	6	15	21	10	8	3	5	8	0
1989–90	Djurgårdens IF	SEL	36	14	20	34	12	8	5	4	9	0
1990–91	Djurgårdens IF	SEL	39	13	27	40	21	7	2	7	9	0
1991–92	Djurgårdens IF	SEL	30	15	21	36	12	9	1	5	6	4
1992–93	EHC Kloten	NDA	36	18	31	49	2	11	4	11	15	4
1993–94	EHC Kloten	NDA	36	23	25	48	24	12	9	12	21	12
1994–95	EHC Kloten	NDA	35	14	36	50	8	12	4	9	13	8
1995–96	EHC Kloten	NDA	35	13	20	33	10	10	5	13	18	2
1997–98	Djurgårdens IF	SEL	43	15	23	38	18	15	6	6	12	4
1998–99	Djurgårdens IF	SEL	39	5	12	17	20	4	0	0	0	0
1999–2000	Djurgårdens IF	SEL	49	17	22	39	16	13	8	8	16	0
2000–01	Djurgårdens IF	SEL	44	11	22	33	0	16	5	10	15	2
2001–02	Djurgårdens IF	SEL	45	9	26	35	10	5	0	1	1	0
2002–03	Djurgårdens IF	SEL	49	2	28	30	24	12	0	1	1	6
2003–04	Djurgårdens IF	SEL	47	10	17	27	10	4	1	1	2	2
2004–05	Djurgårdens IF	SEL	41	3	15	18	6	12	0	2	2	2
SEL totals			582	142	295	437	181	118	32	51	83	22
NDA totals			188	85	139	224	54	49	23	47	70	28

=== International ===
Year	Team	Event	GP	G	A	Pts	PIM
1984	Sweden	EJC	5	3	5	8	—
1986	Sweden	WJC	7	2	3	5	6
1988	Sweden	OLY	8	1	6	7	0
1990	Sweden	WC	9	2	5	7	4
1991	Sweden	WC	10	3	6	9	2
1992	Sweden	OLY	8	3	1	4	2
1994	Sweden	WC	8	2	2	4	0
1995	Sweden	WC	8	3	6	9	4
1998	Sweden	WC	10	1	6	7	0
Junior totals			12	5	8	13	—
Senior totals			61	15	32	47	12

Awards and achievements
Preceded by Daniel Sedin, Henrik Sedin	Golden Puck; 2000	Succeeded by Mikael Renberg
