= Djoos =

Djoos is a Swedish surname. Notable people with the surname include:

- Christian Djoos (born 1994), Swedish ice hockey player
- Pär Djoos (born 1968), Swedish ice hockey player, father of Christian
