= Daun (disambiguation) =

Daun, Germany is a town in the Vulkaneifel district in Rhineland-Palatinate.

Daun may also refer to:

Places

- Daun (Verbandsgemeinde), a collective municipality in Vulkaneifel, Rhineland-Palatinate, Germany
- Kreis Daun, the former name of the district Vulkaneifel in Germany

People with the surname

- Anders Daun (born 1963), Swedish ski jumper
- Count Leopold Joseph von Daun (1705–1766), Austrian field marshal
- Count Wirich Philipp von Daun (1669–1741), Austrian field marshal

== See also ==
- Bukit Daun
