= Göran Johansson (speed skater, born 1958) =

Swedish speed skater

Personal information
- Nationality: Swedish
- Born: 12 August 1958 (age 66); Rättvik, Sweden

Sport
- Sport: Speed skating

Göran Johansson (born 12 August 1958) is a Swedish speed skater. He competed in two events at the 1988 Winter Olympics.
