= 1995–96 Elitserien season =

- League: Elitserien
- Sport: Ice hockey
- Duration: 18 September 1995 – 5 March 1996

Regular season
- League champion: Luleå HF
- Season MVP: Jonas Bergqvist (Leksands IF)
- Top scorer: Esa Keskinen (HV71)

Playoffs
- Finals champions: Luleå HF
- Runners-up: Västra Frölunda

SHL seasons
- ← 1994–95 1996–97 →

The 1995–96 Elitserien season was the 21st season of the Elitserien, the top level of ice hockey in Sweden. 12 teams participated in the league, and Luleå HF won the championship.

== Standings ==
=== First round ===
	Club	GP	W	T	L	GF	GA	Pts
1.	Luleå HF	22	15	1	6	88	59	31
2.	Djurgårdens IF	22	11	4	7	75	59	26
3.	Västra Frölunda	22	11	4	7	71	56	26
4.	HV 71 Jönköping	22	11	3	8	91	72	25
5.	Malmö IF	22	10	5	7	82	77	25
6.	Leksands IF	22	9	5	8	63	61	23
7.	Västerås IK	22	9	4	9	80	86	22
8	Modo Hockey	22	8	4	10	64	80	20
9.	Färjestads BK	22	8	3	11	76	68	19
10.	AIK	22	7	4	11	55	76	18
11.	Rögle BK	22	6	5	11	55	80	17
12.	Brynäs IF	22	3	6	13	60	86	12

=== Final round ===
	Club	GP	W	T	L	GF	GA	Pts
1.	Luleå HF	40	22	6	12	153	109	50
2.	Västra Frölunda	40	20	10	10	130	95	50
3.	Färjestads BK	40	20	6	14	150	117	46
4.	HV 71 Jönköping	40	18	8	14	156	131	44
5.	Djurgårdens IF	40	17	9	14	122	119	43
6.	MODO Hockey	40	15	12	13	126	133	42
7	Leksands IF	40	15	10	15	123	117	40
8.	Malmö IF	40	15	7	18	129	147	37
9.	AIK	40	11	11	18	96	126	33
10.	Västerås IK	40	12	6	22	123	163	30

== Playoffs ==
Quarterfinal
1	Luleå HF	3
8	Malmö IF	2
4	HV 71 Jönköping	1
6	Modo Hockey	3
3	Färjestad BK	3
5	Djurgårdens IF	1
2	Västra Frölunda	3
7	Leksands IF	2

Semifinal
1	Luleå HF	3
6	Modo Hockey	1
3	Färjestads BK	2
2	Västra Frölunda	3

Final
1	Luleå HF	3
2	Västra Frölunda	1
