= 1996–97 Elitserien season =

- League: Elitserien
- Sport: Ice hockey
- Duration: 17 September 1996 – 9 March 1997

Regular season
- League champion: Leksands IF
- Season MVP: Jörgen Jönsson (Färjestad BK)
- Top scorer: Juha Riihijärvi (Malmö IF)

Playoffs
- Finals champions: Färjestad BK
- Runners-up: Luleå HF

SHL seasons
- ← 1995–96 1997–98 →

The 1996–97 Elitserien season was the 22nd season of the Elitserien, the top level of ice hockey in Sweden. 12 teams participated in the league, and Färjestads BK won the championship.

== Standings ==
	Club	GP	W	T	L	GF	GA	Pts
1.	Leksands IF	50	28	7	15	166	132	63
2.	Luleå HF	50	26	8	16	150	121	60
3.	Färjestads BK	50	26	8	16	148	132	60
4.	Djurgårdens IF	50	27	5	18	186	135	59
5.	AIK	50	23	10	17	149	131	56
6.	HV 71 Jönköping	50	22	9	19	178	159	53
7.	Västra Frölunda	50	17	17	16	134	133	51
8	Malmö IF	50	20	10	20	171	154	50
9.	Brynäs IF	50	21	8	21	155	144	50
10.	Modo Hockey	50	17	6	27	136	167	40
11.	Södertälje SK	50	15	7	28	122	179	37
12.	Västerås IK	50	5	11	34	133	241	21

== Playoffs ==
Quarterfinal
1	Leksands IF	3
8	Malmö IF	1
3	Färjestads BK	3
6	HV 71 Jönköping	2
4	Djurgårdens IF	1
5	AIK	3
2	Luleå HF	3
7	Västra Frölunda	0

Semifinal
1	Leksands IF	2
3	Färjestads BK	3
5	AIK	0
2	Luleå HF	3

Finale
3	Färjestads BK	3
2	Luleå HF	1
