= 1994–95 Elitserien season =

- League: Elitserien
- Sport: Ice hockey
- Duration: 19 September 1994 – 2 March 1995

Regular season
- League champion: Djurgårdens IF
- Season MVP: Tomas Jonsson (Leksands IF)
- Top scorer: Mika Nieminen (Luleå HF)

Playoffs
- Finals champions: HV71
- Runners-up: Brynäs IF

SHL seasons
- 1993–94 1995–96

The 1994–95 Elitserien season was the 20th season of the Elitserien, the top level of ice hockey in Sweden. 12 teams participated in the league, and HV71 Jönköping won the championship, defeating Brynäs IF in the final-games.

== Standings ==
=== First round ===
| | Club | GP | W | T | L | GF | GA | Pts |
|---|---|---|---|---|---|---|---|---|
| 1. | Djurgårdens IF | 22 | 12 | 5 | 5 | 72 | 51 | 29 |
| 2. | Färjestads BK | 22 | 13 | 2 | 7 | 77 | 68 | 28 |
| 3. | Brynäs IF | 22 | 12 | 4 | 6 | 70 | 63 | 28 |
| 4. | Luleå HF | 22 | 11 | 5 | 6 | 90 | 72 | 27 |
| 5. | Malmö IF | 22 | 11 | 5 | 6 | 70 | 60 | 27 |
| 6. | Leksands IF | 22 | 11 | 1 | 10 | 85 | 72 | 23 |
| 7. | Modo Hockey | 22 | 8 | 5 | 9 | 60 | 61 | 21 |
| 8 | HV 71 Jönköping | 22 | 8 | 4 | 10 | 77 | 76 | 20 |
| 9. | AIK | 22 | 7 | 4 | 11 | 67 | 85 | 18 |
| 10. | Västerås IK | 22 | 8 | 1 | 13 | 71 | 72 | 17 |
| 11. | Västra Frölunda | 22 | 6 | 5 | 11 | 63 | 70 | 17 |
| 12. | Rögle BK | 22 | 5 | 1 | 16 | 49 | 93 | 11 |

=== Final round ===
| | Club | GP | W | T | L | GF | GA | Pts |
|---|---|---|---|---|---|---|---|---|
| 1. | Djurgårdens IF | 40 | 24 | 7 | 9 | 139 | 96 | 55 |
| 2. | Malmö IF | 40 | 20 | 13 | 7 | 130 | 105 | 53 |
| 3. | Luleå HF | 40 | 21 | 10 | 9 | 164 | 116 | 52 |
| 4. | Leksands IF | 40 | 21 | 6 | 13 | 155 | 132 | 48 |
| 5. | Brynäs IF | 40 | 17 | 8 | 15 | 120 | 128 | 42 |
| 6. | Färjestads BK | 40 | 17 | 6 | 17 | 128 | 135 | 40 |
| 7 | Västerås IK | 40 | 15 | 7 | 18 | 145 | 137 | 37 |
| 8. | HV 71 Jönköping | 40 | 12 | 9 | 19 | 117 | 143 | 33 |
| 9. | AIK | 40 | 11 | 8 | 21 | 112 | 147 | 30 |
| 10. | MODO Hockey | 40 | 8 | 10 | 22 | 120 | 140 | 26 |

(Finland) Mika Nieminen Luleå HF - 18+31 (38)
Per-Erik Eklund Leksands IF - 13+36 (38)
Niklas Eriksson Leksands IF - 17+26 (39)
(Finland) Esa Keskinen HV71 - 15+28 (39)
Markus Åkerblom Leksands IF - 14+29

== Playoffs ==
Quarterfinal
1 | Djurgårdens IF | 0
8 | HV 71 Jönköping | 3
2 | Malmö IF | 3
7 | Västerås IK | 1
3 | Luleå HF | 3
6 | Färjestads BK | 1
4 | Leksands IF | 1
5 | Brynäs IF | 3

Semifinal
8 | HV 71 Jönköping | 3
2 | Malmö IF | 2
3 | Luleå HF | 2
5 | Brynäs IF | 3

Final
8 | HV 71 Jönköping | 3
5 | Brynäs IF | 2

Brunäs IF - HV 71 = 4:2 (0:1, 2:0, 2:1)

HV 71 - Brunäs IF = 4:0 (1:0, 3:0, 0:0)

Brunäs IF - HV 71 = 3:2 (2:0, 0:1, 0:0)

HV 71 - Brunäs IF = 4:2 (1:0, 0:1, 3:1)

Brunäs IF - HV 71 = 4:5 oт (1:1, 2:1, 1:2, 0:1)
