= 1993–94 Elitserien season =

1993–1994 season of the Swedish Elite League

- League: Elitserien
- Sport: Ice hockey
- Duration: 23 September 1993 – 15 March 1994

Regular season
- League champion: Leksands IF
- Season MVP: Peter Forsberg (Modo Hockey)
- Top scorer: Mika Nieminen (Luleå HF)

Playoffs
- Finals champions: Malmö IF
- Runners-up: Modo HK

SHL seasons
- ← 1992–93 1994–95 →

The 1993–94 Elitserien season was the 19th season of the Elitserien, the top level of ice hockey in Sweden. 12 teams participated in the league, and Malmö IF won the championship.

== Standings ==
=== First round ===
	Club	GP	W	T	L	GF	GA	Pts
1.	Leksands IF	22	13	4	5	78	59	30
2.	Malmö IF	22	11	5	6	91	78	27
3.	Rögle BK	22	10	4	8	85	75	24
4.	Västra Frölunda	22	9	6	7	60	56	24
5.	Djurgårdens IF	22	10	4	8	66	66	24
6.	Västerås IK	22	9	4	9	70	68	22
7	Brynäs IF	22	9	3	10	58	54	21
8.	HV 71 Jönköping	22	8	5	9	60	61	21
9.	Luleå HF	22	8	5	9	74	83	21
10.	Modo Hockey	22	9	2	11	78	80	20
11.	Färjestad BK	22	7	4	11	66	73	18
12.	IF Björklöven	22	5	2	15	57	90	12

=== Final round ===
	Club	GP	W	T	L	GF	GA	Pts
1.	Leksands IF	40	22	6	12	141	112	50
2.	Malmö IF	40	22	4	14	131	107	48
3.	Frölunda HC	40	19	8	13	164	143	46
4.	Brynäs IF	40	18	8	14	122	117	44
5.	VIK Västerås HK	40	17	8	15	132	123	42
6.	Djurgårdens IF	40	17	7	16	160	157	41
7	Rögle BK	40	15	8	17	140	137	38
8.	Modo Hockey	40	17	4	19	141	151	38
9.	HV 71 Jönköping	40	15	7	18	111	118	37
10.	Luleå HF	40	12	6	22	131	168	30

== Playoffs ==
Quarterfinal
1	Leksands IF	1
8	Modo Hockey	3
3	Frölunda HC	1
6	Djurgårdens IF	3
2	Malmö IF	3
7	Rögle BK	0
4	Brynäs IF	3
5	VIK Västerås HK	1

Semifinal
8	Modo Hockey	2
6	Djurgårdens IF	0
2	Malmö IF	2
4	Brynäs IF	1

Final
8	Modo Hockey	2
2	Malmö IF	3
