= 1986–87 Elitserien season =

- League: Elitserien
- Sport: Ice hockey
- Duration: 9 October 1986 – 26 February 1987

Regular season
- League champion: Färjestads BK

Playoffs
- Finals champions: IF Björklöven
- Runners-up: Färjestads BK

SHL seasons
- ← 1985–86 1987–88 →

The 1986–87 Elitserien season was the 12th season of the Elitserien, the top level of ice hockey in Sweden. 10 teams participated in the league, and IF Bjorkloven won the championship.

== Standings ==
	Club	GP	W	T	L	GF	GA	Pts
1.	Färjestads BK	36	22	5	9	160	118	49
2.	IF Björklöven	36	23	1	12	158	103	47
3.	Luleå HF	36	17	7	12	148	133	41
4.	Djurgårdens IF	36	17	5	14	137	119	39
5.	HV71	36	16	5	15	103	115	37
6.	Brynäs IF	36	14	4	18	112	121	32
7	Södertälje SK	36	13	6	17	123	133	32
8.	Leksands IF	36	12	6	18	128	162	30
9.	Skellefteå AIK	36	12	4	20	112	146	28
10.	MoDo AIK	36	8	9	19	129	160	25

== Playoffs ==
Semifinal
1	Färjestads BK	2
3	Luleå HF	1
2	IF Björklöven	2
4	Djurgårdens IF	0

Final
1	Färjestads BK	1
2	IF Björklöven	3
