= 1992–93 Elitserien season =

- League: Elitserien
- Sport: Ice hockey
- Duration: 24 September 1992 – 11 March 1993

Regular season
- League champion: Västerås IK
- Season MVP: Peter Forsberg (Modo Hockey)
- Top scorer: Håkan Loob (Färjestad BK)

Playoffs
- Finals champions: Brynäs IF
- Runners-up: Luleå HF

SHL seasons
- ← 1991–92 1993–94 →

The 1992–93 Elitserien season was the 18th season of the Elitserien, the top level of ice hockey in Sweden. 12 teams participated in the league, and Brynäs IF won the championship.

== Standings ==
=== First round ===
	Club	GP	W	T	L	GF	GA	Pts
1.	Västerås IK	22	13	4	5	79	55	30
2.	Brynäs IF	22	12	3	7	73	71	27
3.	Färjestad BK	22	11	3	8	82	65	25
4.	Malmö IF	22	11	3	8	83	67	25
5.	Modo Hockey	22	11	2	9	87	77	24
6.	Djurgårdens IF	22	9	5	8	55	55	23
7	Luleå HF	22	9	2	11	67	73	20
8.	HV 71 Jönköping	22	8	4	10	71	82	20
9.	Leksands IF	22	9	1	12	76	76	19
10.	Rögle BK	22	8	3	11	69	71	19
11.	Västra Frölunda	22	8	2	12	67	74	18
12.	AIK	22	5	4	13	46	99	14

=== Final round ===
	Club	GP	W	T	L	GF	GA	Pts
1.	Västerås IK	40	21	10	9	136	101	52
2.	Brynäs IF	40	20	8	12	149	124	48
3.	Malmö IF	40	21	5	14	152	130	47
4.	Färjestads BK	40	19	5	16	159	133	43
5.	MODO Hockey	40	17	6	17	145	140	40
6.	Luleå HF	40	16	7	17	142	134	39
7	Leksands IF	40	17	4	19	137	137	38
8.	Djurgårdens IF	40	15	8	17	97	110	38
9.	HV 71 Jönköping	40	13	8	19	123	149	34
10.	Rögle BK	40	13	7	20	119	140	33

== Playoffs ==
Quarterfinal
1	Västerås IK	1
8	Djurgårdens IF	2
4	Färjestads BK	1
6	Luleå HF	2
3	Malmö IF	2
5	MODO Hockey	1
2	Brynäs IF	2
7	Leksands IF	0

Semifinal
8	Djurgårdens IF	1
6	Luleå HF	2
3	Malmö IF	1
2	Brynäs IF	2

Final
6	Luleå HF	2
2	Brynäs IF	3
