= 1989–90 Elitserien season =

- League: Elitserien
- Sport: Ice hockey
- Duration: 24 September 1989 – 25 February 1990

Regular season
- League champion: Färjestads BK
- Season MVP: Rolf Ridderwall (Djurgårdens IF)
- Top scorer: Robert Burakovsky (AIK)

Playoffs
- Finals champions: Djurgårdens IF
- Runners-up: Färjestads BK

SHL seasons
- ← 1988–89 1990–91 →

The 1989–90 Elitserien season was the 15th season of the Elitserien, the top level of ice hockey in Sweden. 12 teams participated in the league, and Djurgårdens IF won the championship.

== Standings ==
=== First round ===
	Club	GP	W	T	L	GF	GA	Pts
1.	Färjestads BK	22	15	1	6	112	76	31
2.	Djurgårdens IF	22	13	3	6	82	58	29
3.	Leksands IF	22	12	1	9	99	75	25
4.	Södertälje SK	22	12	0	10	87	80	24
5.	Luleå HF	22	11	2	9	88	91	24
6.	Brynäs IF	22	11	0	11	91	89	22
7	AIK	22	10	1	11	100	86	21
8.	Västerås IK	22	9	3	10	67	73	21
9.	HV 71 Jönköping	22	9	2	11	69	88	20
10.	Västra Frölunda	22	9	1	12	82	106	19
11.	Modo Hockey	22	7	3	12	79	101	17
12.	Skellefteå HC	22	5	1	16	68	108	11

=== Final round ===
	Club	GP	W	T	L	GF	GA	Pts
1.	Färjestads BK	40	28	3	9	196	117	59
2.	Djurgårdens IF	40	23	6	11	158	119	52
3.	Luleå HF	40	21	2	17	159	163	44
4.	Brynäs IF	40	20	3	17	175	160	43
5.	Leksands IF	40	19	4	17	165	140	42
6.	Södertälje SK	40	19	1	20	147	159	39
7	Västerås IK	40	17	5	18	135	147	39
8.	AIK	40	17	1	22	186	179	35
9.	HV 71 Jönköping	40	16	3	21	131	161	35
10.	Västra Frölunda	40	13	2	25	154	202	28

== Playoffs ==
Quarterfinal
1	Färjestads BK	2
8	AIK	1
4	Brynäs IF	2
6	Södertälje SK	0
3	Luleå HF	2
5	Leksands IF	1
2	Djurgårdens IF	2
7	Västerås IK	0

Semifinal
1	Färjestads BK	2
4	Brynäs IF	1
3	Luleå HF	0
2	Djurgårdens IF	2

Final
1	Färjestads BK	1
2	Djurgårdens IF	3
