= 1987–88 Elitserien season =

- League: Elitserien
- Sport: Ice hockey
- Duration: 29 September 1987 – 24 March 1988

Regular season
- League champion: Djurgårdens IF

Playoffs
- Finals champions: Färjestads BK
- Runners-up: IF Björklöven

SHL seasons
- ← 1986-87 1988–89 →

The 1987–88 Elitserien season was the 13th season of the Elitserien, the top level of ice hockey in Sweden. 12 teams participated in the league, and Farjestads BK won the championship.

== Standings ==
=== First round ===
	Club	GP	W	T	L	GF	GA	Pts
1.	Djurgårdens IF	22	18	0	4	109	49	36
2.	IF Björklöven	22	14	2	6	84	73	30
3.	MoDo Hockey	22	11	6	5	82	66	28
4.	Färjestads BK	22	10	4	8	101	77	24
5.	Brynäs IF	22	10	3	9	79	73	23
6.	Leksands IF	22	10	2	10	73	83	22
7	Luleå HF	22	10	1	11	88	95	21
8.	Södertälje SK	22	9	2	11	70	80	20
9.	HV 71 Jönköping	22	9	2	11	83	97	20
10.	AIK	22	8	3	11	64	68	19
11.	Skellefteå HC	22	8	2	12	78	91	18
12.	Väsby IK	22	1	1	20	58	117	3

=== Final round ===
	Club	GP	W	T	L	GF	GA	Pts
1.	Djurgårdens IF	40	27	2	11	193	116	56
2.	IF Björklöven	40	23	3	14	144	138	49
3.	Leksands IF	40	22	3	15	147	149	47
4.	Södertälje SK	40	21	2	17	153	143	44
5.	MoDo Hockey	40	18	7	15	146	141	43
6.	Färjestads BK	40	17	6	17	167	143	40
7	HV 71 Jönköping	40	17	5	18	149	188	39
8.	AIK	40	17	4	19	142	139	38
9.	Luleå HF	40	17	4	9	154	160	38
10.	Brynäs IF	40	11	7	22	125	153	29

== Playoffs ==
Quarterfinals
1	Djurgårdens IF	1
8	AIK	2
3	Leksands IF	1
6	Färjestads BK	2
4	Södertälje SK	0
5	MoDo Hockey	2
2	IF Björklöven	2
7	HV 71 Jönköping	0

Semifinals
8	AIK	0
6	Färjestads BK	2
5	MoDO Hockey	0
2	IF Björklöven	2

Final
6	Färjestads BK	3
2	IF Björklöven	1
