= 1990–91 Elitserien season =

- League: Elitserien
- Sport: Ice hockey
- Duration: 20 September 1990 – 3 March 1991

Regular season
- League champion: Djurgårdens IF
- Season MVP: Thomas Rundqvist (Färjestad BK)
- Top scorer: Håkan Loob (Färjestad BK)

Playoffs
- Finals champions: Djurgårdens IF
- Runners-up: Färjestad BK

SHL seasons
- ← 1989–90 1991–92 →

The 1990–91 Elitserien season was the 16th season of the Elitserien, the top level of ice hockey in Sweden. 12 teams participated in the league, and Djurgårdens IF won the championship.

== Standings ==
=== First round ===
	Club	GP	W	T	L	GF	GA	Pts
1.	Djurgårdens IF	22	14	2	6	84	58	30
2.	Färjestads BK	22	13	3	6	98	65	29
3.	Luleå HF	22	12	1	9	107	75	25
4.	AIK	22	10	5	7	70	66	25
5.	HV 71 Jönköping	22	9	4	9	81	68	22
6.	Malmö IF	22	9	3	10	70	70	21
7	Modo Hockey	22	8	5	9	76	84	21
8.	Brynäs IF	22	8	4	10	65	75	20
9.	Västerås IK	22	7	6	9	67	79	20
10.	Södertälje SK	22	8	4	10	73	92	20
11.	Leksands IF	22	8	3	11	66	87	19
12.	Västra Frölunda	22	3	6	13	59	57	12

=== Final round ===
	Club	GP	W	T	L	GF	GA	Pts
1.	Djurgårdens IF	40	22	6	12	144	108	50
2.	Färjestads BK	40	20	8	12	161	127	48
3.	Luleå HF	40	23	1	16	181	141	47
4.	Västerås IK	40	19	8	13	135	132	46
5.	Malmö IF	40	19	7	14	152	129	45
6.	HV 71 Jönköping	40	17	5	18	142	119	39
7	Södertälje SK	40	15	7	18	147	172	37
8.	Brynäs IF	40	14	6	20	112	133	34
9.	AIK	40	13	8	19	121	144	34
10.	MODO Hockey	40	13	7	20	133	164	33

== Playoffs ==
Quarterfinal
1	Djurgårdens IF	2
7	Södertälje SK	0
4	Västerås IK	2
6	HV 71 Jönköping	0
3	Luleå HF	2
5	Malmö IF	0
2	Färjestads BK	2
8	Brynäs IF	0

Semifinal
1	Djurgårdens IF	2
4	Västerås IK	0
3	Luleå HF	1
2	Färjestads BK	2

Final
1	Djurgårdens IF	3
2	Färjestads BK	0
