= 1991–92 Elitserien season =

- League: Elitserien
- Sport: Ice hockey
- Duration: 26 September 1991 – 19 March 1992

Regular season
- League champion: Färjestad BK
- Season MVP: Tommy Sjödin (Brynäs IF)
- Top scorer: Håkan Loob (Färjestad BK)

Playoffs
- Finals champions: Malmö IF
- Runners-up: Djurgårdens IF

SHL seasons
- 1990–91 1992–93

The 1991–92 Elitserien season was the 17th season of the Elitserien, the top level of ice hockey in Sweden. 12 teams participated in the league, and Malmo IF won the championship.

== Standings ==
=== First round ===
	Club	GP	W	T	L	GF	GA	Pts
1.	Malmö IF	22	16	2	4	98	53	34
2.	Färjestads BK	22	13	3	6	107	77	29
3.	Djurgårdens IF	22	10	5	7	79	63	25
4.	Luleå HF	22	9	7	6	88	89	25
5.	Västra Frölunda	22	9	5	8	86	78	23
6.	HV 71 Jönköping	22	10	3	9	77	72	23
7	AIK	22	11	1	10	68	72	23
8.	Brynäs IF	22	9	3	10	78	73	21
9.	Västerås IK	22	9	2	11	65	63	20
10.	Modo Hockey	22	5	6	11	60	93	16
11.	Leksands IF	22	3	9	10	64	92	15
12.	Södertälje SK	22	4	2	16	54	99	10

Håkan Loob Färjestads BK - 24+15 (22)

=== Final round ===
	Club	GP	W	T	L	GF	GA	Pts
1.	Färjestads BK	40	20	9	11	189	139	49
2.	Malmö IF	40	21	6	13	163	134	48
3.	Brynäs IF	40	22	3	15	157	124	47
4.	Luleå HF	40	17	13	10	169	151	47
5.	Västra Frölunda	40	17	11	12	149	139	45
6.	Djurgårdens IF	40	16	11	13	122	116	43
7	AIK	40	19	4	17	134	141	42
8.	HV 71 Jönköping	40	17	7	16	151	129	41
9.	Västerås IK	40	15	4	21	111	125	34
10.	MODO Hockey	40	6	11	23	118	192	23

== Playoffs ==
Quarterfinal
1	Färjestads BK	2
8	HV 71 Jönköping	1
4	Luleå HF	0
6	Djurgårdens IF	2
3	Brynäs IF	2
5	Västra Frölunda	1
2	Malmö IF	2
7	AIK	0

Semifinal
1	Färjestads BK	1
6	Djurgårdens IF	2
3	Brynäs IF	0
2	Malmö IF	2

Final
6	Djurgårdens IF	2
2	Malmö IF	3
