= 1988–89 Elitserien season =

- League: Elitserien
- Sport: Ice hockey
- Duration: 2 October 1988 – 23 February 1989

Regular season
- League champion: Djurgårdens IF
- Season MVP: Kent Nilsson (Djurgårdens IF)
- Top scorer: Lars-Gunnar Pettersson (Luleå HF)

Playoffs
- Finals champions: Djurgårdens IF
- Runners-up: Leksands IF

SHL seasons
- ← 1987–88 1989–90 →

The 1988–89 Elitserien season was the 14th season of the Elitserien, the top level of ice hockey in Sweden. 12 teams participated in the league, and Djurgårdens IF won the championship.

== Standings ==
=== First round ===
	Club	GP	W	T	L	GF	GA	Pts
1.	Leksands IF	22	13	1	8	107	75	27
2.	AIK	22	13	0	9	87	65	26
3.	Djurgårdens IF	22	12	2	8	75	65	26
4.	Södertälje SK	22	10	6	6	80	74	26
5.	Luleå HF	22	12	1	9	93	85	25
6.	Färjestads BK	22	11	1	10	86	78	23
7	HV 71 Jönköping	22	10	2	10	92	79	22
8.	Brynäs IF	22	9	2	11	66	78	20
9.	Modo Hockey	22	9	2	11	74	89	20
10.	Skellefteå AIK	22	8	1	13	71	75	17
11.	Västerås IK	22	7	3	12	69	108	17
12.	IF Björklöven	22	5	5	12	59	88	15

=== Final round ===
	Club	GP	W	T	L	GF	GA	Pts
1.	Djurgårdens IF	40	24	5	11	162	124	53
2.	Leksands IF	40	25	2	13	204	151	52
3.	Södertälje SK	40	19	8	13	157	140	46
4.	Luleå HF	40	20	3	17	177	170	43
5.	Färjestads BK	40	20	2	18	161	153	42
6.	Brynäs IF	40	19	3	18	161	142	41
7	AIK	40	19	2	19	142	147	40
8.	HV 71 Jönköping	40	17	3	20	156	155	37
9.	MODO Hockey	40	17	3	20	148	170	37
10.	Skellefteå AIK	40	10	1	29	122	170	21

== Playoffs ==
Quarterfinal
1	Djurgårdens IF	2
7	AIK	0
4	Luleå HF	1
6	Brynäs IF	2
3	Södertälje SK	2
5	Färjestads BK	0
2	Leksands IF	2
8	HV 71 Jönköping	1

Semifinal
1	Djurgårdens IF	2
6	Brynäs IF	0
3	Södertälje SK	1
2	Leksands IF	2

Final
1	Djurgårdens IF	3
2	Leksands IF	1
