= Jim Bedard (ice hockey, born 1956) =

Canadian ice hockey player

Jim Bédard
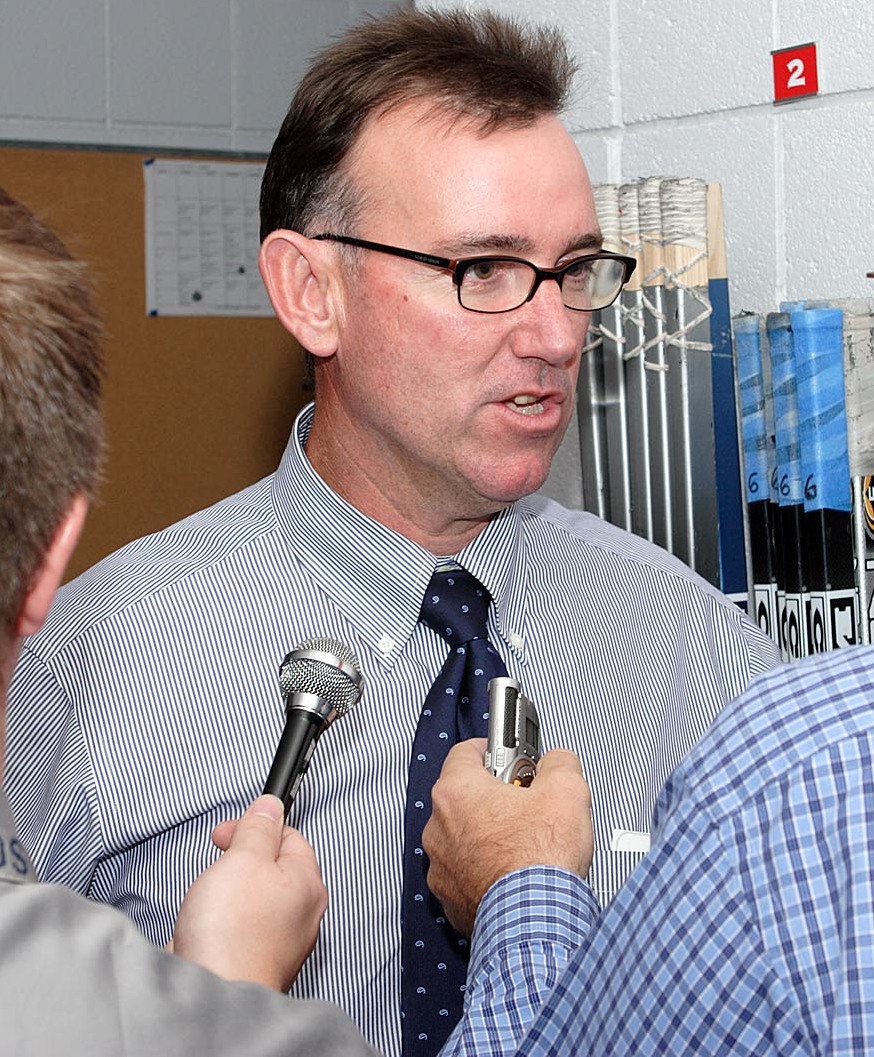
- Bédard in 2005
- Born: November 17, 1956 (age 69) Niagara Falls, Ontario, Canada
- Height: 6 ft 0 in (183 cm)
- Weight: 179 lb (81 kg; 12 st 11 lb)
- Position: Goaltender
- Caught: Left
- Played for: Washington Capitals; TPS; HPK
- NHL draft: 91st overall, 1976; Washington Capitals
- WHA draft: 106th overall, 1976; Edmonton Oilers
- Playing career: 1976–1994

James Arthur Bédard (born November 17, 1956) is a Canadian former professional ice hockey goaltender. He played 73 games in the National Hockey League with the Washington Capitals during the 1977–78 and 1978–79 seasons. The rest of his career, which lasted from 1976 to 1994, was spent in the minor leagues and then mainly in I-Divisioona, the second level of hockey in Finland. After his playing career Bédard worked in coaching, serving as the goaltending coach for the Detroit Red Wings from 1996 to 2016 and winning the Stanley Cup three times with the team.

== Career ==
Originally drafted in 1976 by the Washington Capitals, Bédard played for parts of two seasons with the Capitals. After playing two seasons in the minor leagues, Bédard signed to play in the Finnish SM-liiga. After two seasons with HC TPS, he played in Finland for 12 seasons more, mostly in lower divisions, before finally retiring in 1994.

After his playing career, he served as the goaltending coach with the Detroit Red Wings for 19 seasons. He won the Stanley Cup three times with Detroit, in 1998, 2002 and 2008. On May 9, 2016, it was reported that Bédard's contract with the team would not be renewed.

Bédard is also the goalie coach for the Detroit Red Wings Alumni Association and is active in its efforts to raise money for children's charities in Metro Detroit. In the 2016–17 season, Bédard was the goaltending coach for the OHL's Windsor Spitfires. For 2017–18, Bédard became the goaltending coach for the Texas Stars.

== Career statistics ==
=== Regular season and playoffs ===
			Regular season									Playoffs
Season	Team	League	GP	W	L	T	MIN	GA	SO	GAA	SV%	GP	W	L	MIN	GA	SO	GAA	SV%
1972–73	Welland Cougars	OHA-B	42	—	—	—	2485	178	0	4.30	—	—	—	—	—	—	—	—	—
1973–74	Sudbury Wolves	OHA	28	—	—	—	1635	117	0	4.29	—	—	—	—	—	—	—	—	—
1974–75	Sudbury Wolves	OMJHL	51	—	—	—	3060	187	0	3.67	—	13	—	—	750	43	0	3.44	—
1975–76	Sudbury Wolves	OMJHL	58	—	—	—	3328	177	1	3.15	—	17	9	7	1000	62	1	3.60	—
1976–77	Dayton Gems	IHL	48	—	—	—	2693	168	0	3.74	—	2	—	—	120	9	0	4.50	—
1977–78	Washington Capitals	NHL	43	11	23	7	2489	152	1	3.67	.879	—	—	—	—	—	—	—	—
1977–78	Hershey Bears	AHL	14	6	7	1	766	39	0	3.05	—	—	—	—	—	—	—	—	—
1978–79	Washington Capitals	NHL	30	6	17	6	1736	126	0	4.36	.863	—	—	—	—	—	—	—	—
1978–79	Hershey Bears	AHL	26	9	11	2	1404	88	0	3.76	—	—	—	—	—	—	—	—	—
1979–80	Hershey Bears	AHL	2	—	—	—	60	9	0	9.00	.719	—	—	—	—	—	—	—	—
1979–80	Cincinnati Stingers	CHL	8	3	4	0	385	32	0	4.99	.807	—	—	—	—	—	—	—	—
1979–80	Rochester Americans	AHL	6	—	—	—	339	20	0	3.54	.872	—	—	—	—	—	—	—	—
1979–80	Tulsa Oilers	CHL	3	0	3	0	177	10	0	3.39	.886	—	—	—	—	—	—	—	—
1979–80	Dayton Gems	IHL	16	—	—	—	858	55	0	3.85	—	—	—	—	—	—	—	—	—
1980–81	TPS	FIN	29	—	—	—	—	112	0	3.90	.865	—	—	—	—	—	—	—	—
1981–82	TPS	FIN	27	—	—	—	1620	95	1	3.52	.879	—	—	—	—	—	—	—	—
1982–83	Imatran Ketterä	FIN-2	11	—	—	—	380	44	0	6.95	.884	—	—	—	—	—	—	—	—
1983–84	TuTu	FIN-2	35	—	—	—	1172	130	—	6.66	—	—	—	—	—	—	—	—	—
1984–85	TuTu	FIN-2	44	—	—	—	2640	139	0	3.28	—	—	—	—	—	—	—	—	—
1985–86	TuTu	FIN-2	44	—	—	—	1413	127	0	5.39	—	—	—	—	—	—	—	—	—
1986–87	TuTu	FIN-2	34	—	—	—	2040	80	—	2.36	.928	—	—	—	—	—	—	—	—
1987–88	TuTu	FIN-2	36	—	—	—	2160	86	—	2.39	.915	—	—	—	—	—	—	—	—
1988–89	HPK	FIN	31	—	—	—	1737	123	0	4.25	.881	—	—	—	—	—	—	—	—
1989–90	Kiekko-67 Turku	FIN-2	31	—	—	—	1577	122	1	4.64	—	—	—	—	—	—	—	—	—
1990–91	Kiekko-67 Turku	FIN-2	37	19	12	3	2177	108	0	2.98	.914	—	—	—	—	—	—	—	—
1991–92	Kiekko-67 Turku	FIN-2	40	19	18	3	2310	161	0	4.18	.891	—	—	—	—	—	—	—	—
1992–93	Turku HT	FIN-3	—	—	—	—	—	—	—	—	—	—	—	—	—	—	—	—	—
1993–94	TuTu	FIN-2	37	—	—	—	2220	132	0	3.57	.890	—	—	—	—	—	—	—	—
NHL totals			2	0	1	0	70	5	0	4.35	.815	—	—	—	—	—	—	—	—
