= Kai Ortio =

Finnish ice hockey player and coach

- Born: 23 September 1965 (age 60) Turku, Finland
- Height: 185 cm (6 ft 1 in)
- Weight: 94 kg (207 lb; 14 st 11 lb)
- Position: Defence
- Shot: Left
- Played for: Turun Palloseura; Turun Toverit; Forssan Palloseura; Oulun Kärpät
- Current U16 Mestis coach: TPS U16 Akatemia
- Coached for: TPS Naiset; TUTO Hockey U18; TUTO Hockey (assist.); TPS U20; TuTo U20; TuTo U18
- Playing career: 1984–1998
- Coaching career: 2001–present

Kai Ortio (born 23 September 1965) is a Finnish former professional ice hockey player and the current head coach of Turun Palloseura (TPS) Akatemia U16, a junior ice hockey team in the U16 Mestis. During his playing career, he played two seasons in the SM-liiga, appearing with HC TPS in 45 games during the 1987–88 and 1988–89 seasons and registering three points (0 goals+3 assists) and 22 penalty minutes.

== Playing career ==
Ortio developed in the minor and junior ice hockey systems of Turun Toverit (TuTo or TUTO) in his hometown of Turku. At age 19, he made his professional debut with the club's representative team, TuTo Hockey, in the 1984–85 I-Divisioona season.

Ortio went on to play the entirety of his fourteen season professional career in Finland, playing ten seasons in the second-tier I-divisioona and two seasons in the third-tier II-divisioona, in addition to his two seasons with TPS Turku in the SM-liiga. Eight of his seasons in the I-divisioona were spent with TuTo and, during the 1996–97 and 1997–98 seasons, his last active seasons before retirement, he served as the team's captain. The other two I-divisioona seasons were played with Oulun Kärpät in 1989–90 and Forssan Palloseura (FPS, previously FoPS) in 1990–91. In the II-divisioona, he played the 1994–95 season with Lätkä-77 and the 1995–96 season with Uudenkaupungin Jää-Kotkat (UJK).

== Personal life ==
Ortio's son, Joni Ortio, is an active professional goaltender and his career has included playing in the National Hockey League (NHL), the Kontinental Hockey League (KHL), the SM-liiga, and the Swedish Hockey League (SHL).

== Career statistics ==
=== Regular season and playoffs ===
			Regular season					Postseason
Season	Team	League	GP	G	A	Pts	PIM	GP	G	A	Pts	PIM
1984–85	TuTo	I-div.	29	0	2	2	8	—	—	—	—	—
1985–86	TuTo	I-div.	44	8	8	16	25	—	—	—	—	—
1986–87	TuTo	I-div.	44	5	12	17	22	—	—	—	—	—
1987–88	TPS	SM-liiga	37	0	3	3	18	—	—	—	—	—
1988–89	TPS	SM-liiga	8	0	0	0	4	1	0	0	0	0
1989–90	Kärpät	I-div.	42	5	12	17	12	—	—	—	—	—
1990–91	FoPS	I-div.	42	7	21	28	48	—	—	—	—	—
1991–92	TuTo	I-div.	44	14	12	26	26	—	—	—	—	—
1992–93	TuTo	I-div.	44	9	16	25	46	6	1	3	4	18
1993–94	TuTo	I-div.	43	5	8	13	24	6	0	0	0	4
1994–95	Lätkä-77	II-div.	26	11	19	30	59	—	—	—	—	—
1995–96	UJK	II-div.	35	17	23	40	8	14	3	3	6	4
1996–97	TuTo	I-div.	39	9	17	26	26	—	—	—	—	—
1997–98	TuTo	I-div.	40	5	14	19	38	3	0	0	0	2
SM-liiga totals			45	0	3	3	22	1	0	0	0	4
I-divisioona totals			411	67	122	189	275	15	1	3	4	24
II-divisioona totals			61	28	42	70	67	14	3	3	6	4
