= Markku Kyllönen =

Finnish ice hockey player

- Born: February 15, 1962 (age 63); Joensuu, Finland
- Height: 6 ft 2 in (188 cm)
- Weight: 200 lb (91 kg; 14 st 4 lb)
- Position: Left wing
- Shot: Left
- Played for: SaiPa; Kärpät; Winnipeg Jets; Newcastle Cobras; Odense Bulldogs
- National team: Finland
- NHL draft: 163rd overall, 1987; Winnipeg Jets
- Playing career: 1980–2000

Markku Kyllönen (born February 15, 1962) is a retired professional ice hockey player who played in the National Hockey League and SM-liiga. He played for Kärpät, SaiPa, and Winnipeg Jets. After spending several years in Finland, Kyllönen moved to North America in 1988, playing nine games for Winnipeg while mainly playing for their American Hockey League affiliate. He returned to Europe the following season, and spent the rest of his career playing in different leagues, retiring in 2000. Internationally Kyllönen played for Finland at the 1987 Canada Cup.

== Career statistics ==
=== Regular season and playoffs ===
			Regular season					Playoffs
Season	Team	League	GP	G	A	Pts	PIM	GP	G	A	Pts	PIM
1980–81	JoKP	FIN-2	33	7	6	13	12	—	—	—	—	—
1981–82	JoKP	FIN-2	31	13	16	20	20	—	—	—	—	—
1982–83	JoKP	FIN-2	35	16	23	39	8	—	—	—	—	—
1983–84	JoKP	FIN-2	33	16	12	28	4	—	—	—	—	—
1984–85	JoKP	FIN-2	43	28	27	55	22	—	—	—	—	—
1985–86	SaiPa	FIN	34	12	12	24	14	—	—	—	—	—
1986–87	Oulun Kärpät	FIN	43	24	16	40	14	9	3	2	5	4
1987–88	Oulun Kärpät	FIN	43	8	24	32	32	—	—	—	—	—
1988–89	Winnipeg Jets	NHL	9	0	2	2	2	—	—	—	—	—
1988–89	Moncton Hawks	AHL	60	14	20	34	16	—	—	—	—	—
1989–90	JoKP	FIN	42	16	12	28	22	—	—	—	—	—
1990–91	JoKP	FIN-2	44	42	37	79	22	—	—	—	—	—
1991–92	JoKP	FIN	37	11	15	26	22	—	—	—	—	—
1992–93	JoKP	FIN-2	44	26	42	68	68	6	1	3	4	2
1993–94	JoKP	FIN-2	29	9	22	31	34	6	3	5	8	4
1994–95	Kiekko-Karhut	FIN-3	13	22	20	42	20	15	20	19	39	16
1996–97	Newcastle Cobras	BISL	25	5	7	12	6	6	1	0	1	2
1997–98	EV Landsberg	GER-2	34	15	18	33	24	—	—	—	—	—
1998–99	Odense Bulldogs	DEN	42	22	12	34	51	—	—	—	—	—
1999–00	Odense Bulldogs	DEN	41	26	19	45	0	—	—	—	—	—
FIN totals			199	71	79	150	104	17	7	5	12	8
NHL totals			9	0	2	2	2	—	—	—	—	—

=== International ===
Year	Team	Event	GP	G	A	Pts	PIM
1987	Finland	CC	5	0	2	2	0
Senior totals			5	0	2	2	0
