= Pekka Peltola =

Finnish ice hockey left winger

- Born: April 24, 1965 (age 61) Helsinki, Finland
- Height: 6 ft 2 in (188 cm)
- Weight: 194 lb (88 kg; 13 st 12 lb)
- Position: Left wing
- Shot: Left
- Played for: HPK; Lukko; HIFK; Ässät; Brest Albatros Hockey; EC KAC; Kassel Huskies
- NHL draft: 130th overall, 7th round, 4th pick, 1989; Winnipeg Jets
- Playing career: 1984–2000

Pekka Peltola (born April 24, 1965, in Helsinki, Finland) is a Finnish former ice hockey left winger. He played in the SM-liiga for HPK, Lukko, HIFK and Ässät.

In the 1988–89 season, Peltola won the Jarmo Wasama Memorial Trophy as the SM-liiga's Rookie of the Year after scoring 58 points including 28 goals in just 43 games. He was then drafted 130th overall by the Winnipeg Jets in the 1989 NHL entry draft, though he never played in North America and remained with HPK.

Peltola also played in the French Élite Ligue for Brest Albatros Hockey, the Austrian Hockey League for EC KAC and the German Deutsche Eishockey Liga for the Kassel Huskies.

== Career statistics ==
| | | | Regular season | | | | | Playoffs |
| Season | Team | League | GP | G | A | Pts | PIM | GP | G | A | Pts | PIM |
|---|---|---|---|---|---|---|---|---|---|---|---|---|
| 1984–85 | Karhu-Kissat | I-Divisioona | 22 | 13 | 7 | 20 | 16 | — | — | — | — | — |
| 1985–86 | HPK | I-Divisioona | 44 | 20 | 15 | 35 | 47 | — | — | — | — | — |
| 1986–87 | HPK | I-Divisioona | 43 | 30 | 21 | 51 | 42 | — | — | — | — | — |
| 1987–88 | HPK | I-Divisioona | 39 | 37 | 30 | 67 | 60 | — | — | — | — | — |
| 1988–89 | HPK | Liiga | 43 | 28 | 30 | 58 | 62 | — | — | — | — | — |
| 1989–90 | HPK | Liiga | 44 | 25 | 24 | 49 | 42 | — | — | — | — | — |
| 1990–91 | HPK | Liiga | 41 | 23 | 18 | 41 | 66 | 8 | 3 | 2 | 5 | 10 |
| 1991–92 | HPK | Liiga | 37 | 22 | 20 | 42 | 91 | — | — | — | — | — |
| 1992–93 | Lukko | Liiga | 48 | 26 | 24 | 50 | 42 | 3 | 0 | 0 | 0 | 4 |
| 1993–94 | HIFK | Liiga | 44 | 9 | 18 | 27 | 42 | — | — | — | — | — |
| 1994–95 | HIFK | Liiga | 49 | 15 | 18 | 33 | 26 | 3 | 0 | 1 | 1 | 4 |
| 1995–96 | Ässät | Liiga | 18 | 3 | 2 | 5 | 22 | — | — | — | — | — |
| 1995–96 | Albatros de Brest | France | 11 | 5 | 8 | 13 | 2 | 12 | 1 | 3 | 4 | 4 |
| 1990–91 | Klagenfurter AC | Austria | 29 | 9 | 11 | 20 | 33 | — | — | — | — | — |
| 1996–97 | Kassel Huskies | DEL | 20 | 4 | 4 | 8 | 4 | 10 | 1 | 3 | 4 | 2 |
| 1997–98 | Ahmat Hyvinkää | I-Divisioona | 10 | 2 | 2 | 4 | 32 | — | — | — | — | — |
| 1997–98 | Vimmerby HC | Division 2 | 9 | 6 | 6 | 12 | — | — | — | — | — | — |
| 1999–00 | Kiekko-Vantaa | Suomi-sarja | 11 | 11 | 11 | 22 | 22 | 7 | 2 | 12 | 14 | 48 |
| Liiga totals | | | 324 | 151 | 154 | 305 | 393 | 14 | 3 | 3 | 6 | 18 |

| Preceded by Mika Nieminen | Winner of the Jarmo Wasama memorial trophy 1988–89 | Succeeded by Vesa Viitakoski |
