= Timo Kulonen =

Finnish ice hockey left winger

- Born: November 1, 1967 (age 58) Forssa, Finland
- Height: 6 ft 4 in (193 cm)
- Weight: 229 lb (104 kg; 16 st 5 lb)
- Position: Defence
- Shot: Right
- Played for: KalPa; HPK; Lukko; TuTo
- NHL draft: 130th overall, 1987; Minnesota North Stars
- Playing career: 1983–2008

Timo Kulonen (born November 1, 1967) is a Finnish former professional ice hockey defenceman.

Kulonen played in the SM-liiga for KalPa, HPK, Lukko and TuTo between 1986 and 1995. He played a total of 419 games and scored 47 goals and 115 assists for 162 points. He was drafted 130th overall by the Minnesota North Stars in the 1987 NHL entry draft but never played in North America and remained in Finland.

Kulonen always played in France for Brest Albatros Hockey and in Germany for SC Bietigheim-Bissingen.

== Career statistics ==
			Regular season					Playoffs
Season	Team	League	GP	G	A	Pts	PIM	GP	G	A	Pts	PIM
1983–84	FoPS	I-Divisioona	17	1	0	1	14	—	—	—	—	—
1984–85	FoPS	I-Divisioona	42	11	18	29	60	—	—	—	—	—
1985–86	FoPS	I-Divisioona	40	14	25	39	48	—	—	—	—	—
1986–87	KalPa	Liiga	39	2	8	10	20	—	—	—	—	—
1987–88	KalPa	Liiga	44	7	15	22	32	—	—	—	—	—
1988–89	KalPa	Liiga	40	9	16	25	18	2	0	1	1	0
1989–90	KalPa	Liiga	44	5	20	25	34	6	0	0	0	2
1990–91	HPK	Liiga	42	1	10	11	16	8	0	2	2	4
1991–92	Lukko	Liiga	44	8	17	25	14	2	0	0	0	0
1992–93	Lukko	Liiga	48	8	10	18	48	3	0	0	0	2
1993–94	Lukko	Liiga	41	3	8	11	38	9	0	1	1	4
1994–95	TuTo	Liiga	47	4	7	11	26	—	—	—	—	—
1995–96	Brest Albatros Hockey	France	25	3	9	12	24	—	—	—	—	—
1996–97	Brest Albatros Hockey	France	29	3	12	15	32	—	—	—	—	—
1997–98	SC Bietigheim-Bissingen	Germany2	57	4	32	36	30	—	—	—	—	—
1998–99	Brest Albatros Hockey	France3	—	10	45	55	—	—	—	—	—	—
1999–00	Brest Albatros Hockey	France2	32	4	23	27	—	—	—	—	—	—
2000–01	Brest Albatros Hockey	France3	—	—	—	—	—	—	—	—	—	—
2001–02	Brest Albatros Hockey	France3	—	—	—	—	—	—	—	—	—	—
2002–03	Brest Albatros Hockey	France	17	1	7	8	12	—	—	—	—	—
2003–04	Brest Albatros Hockey	France	24	0	3	3	34	8	1	2	3	2
2004–05	LLuja	Suomi-sarja	37	3	12	15	72	—	—	—	—	—
2005–06	LLuja	2. Divisioona	16	2	12	14	14	—	—	—	—	—
2006–07	LLuja	2. Divisioona	32	6	17	23	24	—	—	—	—	—
2007–08	FPS	Suomi-sarja	20	2	7	9	16	—	—	—	—	—
Liiga totals			389	47	111	158	246	30	0	4	4	12
