= Mikko Outinen =

Finnish ice hockey player

- Born: April 7, 1971 (age 54); Kuusankoski, Finland
- Height: 5 ft 9 in (175 cm)
- Weight: 192 lb (87 kg; 13 st 10 lb)
- Position: Defense
- Shot: Left
- Played for: KooKoo; Ketterä; Junkkarit HT; Ahmat Hyvinkää; Västerviks IK; Waco Wizards
- NHL draft: Undrafted
- Playing career: 1989–2003

Mikko Outinen (born April 7, 1971) is a Finnish former professional ice hockey player. KooKoo of the Finnish Liiga retired his number (#36) after nine seasons with the franchise.

== Career statistics ==
			Regular season					Playoffs
Season	Team	League	GP	G	A	Pts	PIM	GP	G	A	Pts	PIM
1989–90	KooKoo	Liiga	12	0	0	0	0	—	—	—	—	—
1989–90	Regina Pats	WHL	9	1	1	2	12	—	—	—	—	—
1990–91	Weyburn Red Wings	SJHL	21	2	15	17	79	—	—	—	—	—
1990–91	Regina Pats	WHL	6	0	2	2	8	—	—	—	—	—
1990–91	Victoria Cougars	WHL	27	2	8	10	31	—	—	—	—	—
1991–92	Urheilukoulu	Jr. A SM-sarja	12	3	2	5	34	—	—	—	—	—
1992–93	KooKoo	I-Divisioona	44	0	9	9	40	—	—	—	—	—
1993–94	KooKoo	I-Divsioona	32	2	4	6	38	—	—	—	—	—
1993–94	AaKoo	2. Divisioona	1	0	0	0	0	—	—	—	—	—
1994–95	Ketterä Imatra	I-Divisioona	28	4	3	7	36	—	—	—	—	—
1994–95	Junkkarit HT	I-Divisioona	12	3	7	10	28	—	—	—	—	—
1995–96	KooKoo	I-Divisioona	43	7	20	27	44	3	1	3	4	2
1996–97	Ahmat Hyvinkää	I-Divisioona	31	5	13	18	48	—	—	—	—	—
1997–98	Västerviks IK	Division 1	18	1	4	5	20	—	—	—	—	—
1997–98	Waco Wizards	WPHL	32	3	7	10	12	—	—	—	—	—
1998–99	KooKoo	2. Divisioona	13	1	5	6	6	5	0	1	1	4
1999–00	KooKoo	I-Divisioona	47	7	16	23	38	3	0	0	0	4
2000–01	KooKoo	Mestis	41	3	9	12	18	—	—	—	—	—
2001–02	KooKoo	Mestis	42	6	15	21	20	11	1	2	3	16
2002–03	KooKoo	Mestis	30	2	3	5	18	9	0	2	2	29
I-Divisioona totals			237	28	72	100	272	12	2	3	5	6
