= Pekka Tirkkonen =

Finnish ice hockey player and coach

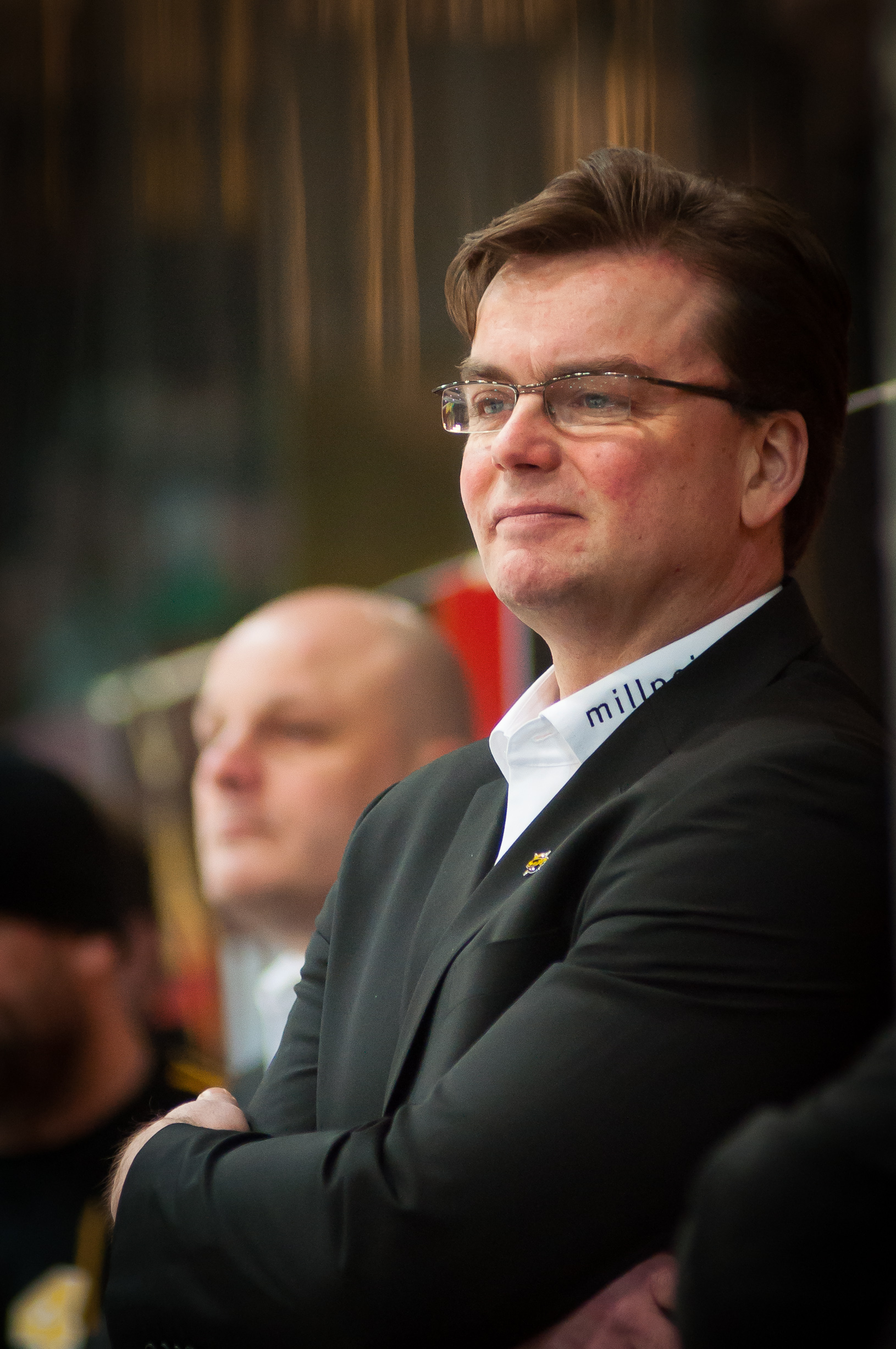
- Born: July 17, 1968 (age 58) Savonlinna, Finland
- Height: 6 ft 2 in (188 cm)
- Weight: 194 lb (88 kg; 13 st 12 lb)
- Position: Right wing
- Shot: Right
- Played for: SEL; Linköpings HC; SM-liiga; HC TPS; KalPa; SaiPa; DEL; Starbulls Rosenheim; Augsburger Panther; Denmark; Herning Blue Fox
- National team: Finland
- NHL draft: 34th overall, 1986; Boston Bruins
- Playing career: 1984–2008

Pekka Tirkkonen (born July 17, 1968) is a Finnish ice hockey coach and former professional ice hockey player. He most recently served as head coach of EHC Kloten of the National League (NL). Tirkkonen was selected by the Boston Bruins in the 2nd round (34th overall) of the 1986 NHL entry draft.

== Playing career ==
Tirkkonen played 14 seasons in Finland's top-tier SM-liiga, registering 161 goals, 236 assists, 397 points, and 241 penalty minutes, in 647 games played for HC TPS, KalPa and SaiPa. He won the championship with TPS in 1989, 1990 and 1991.

Other stops in his playing career included Germany (Starbulls Rosenheim, Augsburger Panther), Sweden (Linköping HC) and Denmark (Herning Blue Fox). He claimed the Danish championship with Herning in 2005, 2007 and 2008, before retiring following the 2007–08 season.

== Coaching career ==
Tirkkonen kicked off his career behind the bench immediately after retiring as a player and was appointed as head coach of Finnish second division side SaPKo prior to the 2008–09 season. After four year at the helm and after receiving Mestis Coach of the Year honors in 2012, he moved on and was named head coach of SaiPa of the country's top-tier Liiga ahead of the 2012-13 campaign. In the 2013–14 season, Tirkkonen won the Kalevi Numminen Trophy as the league's Coach of the Year. He guided SaiPa to the Liiga semifinals that season, where they fell short to eventual champions Kärpät.

Tirkkonen parted ways with SaiPa following the 2015–16 season and was named head coach of EHC Kloten of the National League (NL) on June 24, 2016. He was fired on October 16, 2017, following poor coaching performances.

== Career statistics ==
=== Regular season and playoffs ===
			Regular season					Playoffs
Season	Team	League	GP	G	A	Pts	PIM	GP	G	A	Pts	PIM
1984–85	SaPKo	FIN.2	21	3	5	8	0	—	—	—	—	—
1985–86	SaPKo	FIN.2	40	14	13	27	12	—	—	—	—	—
1986–87	SaPKo	FIN.2	40	15	21	36	10	—	—	—	—	—
1987–88	TPS	SM-l	44	11	12	23	4	—	—	—	—	—
1988–89	TPS	SM-l	42	11	15	26	8	10	1	2	3	0
1989–90	TPS	SM-l	41	17	11	28	0	9	3	4	7	0
1990–91	TPS	SM-l	44	9	23	32	10	9	4	2	6	0
1991–92	KalPa	SM-l	29	5	7	12	6	—	—	—	—	—
1992–93	KalPa	SM-l	48	11	17	28	14	—	—	—	—	—
1993–94	KalPa	SM-l	47	17	24	41	37	—	—	—	—	—
1993–94	HC Královopolská Brno	CZE.2	—	—	—	—	—	1	0	0	0	0
1994–95	KalPa	SM-l	47	19	12	31	30	3	1	0	1	2
1995–96	KalPa	SM-l	48	16	20	36	10	—	—	—	—	—
1996–97	Star Bulls Rosenheim GmbH	DEL	50	18	25	43	14	3	0	4	4	0
1997–98	Augsburger Panther	DEL	41	4	7	11	6	6	1	1	2	0
1998–99	KalPa	SM-l	52	9	20	29	24	—	—	—	—	—
1999–2000	SaiPa	SM-l	52	9	19	28	38	—	—	—	—	—
2000–01	SaiPa	SM-l	45	6	14	20	18	—	—	—	—	—
2001–02	SaiPa	SM-l	55	10	24	34	16	—	—	—	—	—
2002–03	SaiPa	SM-l	53	11	18	29	26	—	—	—	—	—
2003–04	Linköpings HC	SEL	43	3	16	19	12	5	1	0	1	6
2004–05	Herning Blue Fox	DEN	35	16	19	35	12	16	5	11	16	8
2005–06	Herning Blue Fox	DEN	36	19	14	33	18	15	5	17	22	8
2006–07	Herning Blue Fox	DEN	36	12	30	42	20	15	6	4	10	32
2007–08	Herning Blue Fox	DEN	31	9	12	21	16	16	4	8	12	4
SM-l totals			647	161	236	397	241	31	9	8	17	2
DEN totals			138	56	75	131	66	62	20	40	60	52

=== International ===
Year	Team	Event	GP	G	A	Pts	PIM
1986	Finland	EJC	5	4	3	7	2
1987	Finland	WJC	7	6	3	9	2
1988	Finland	WJC	7	4	2	6	0
1990	Finland	WC	9	2	0	2	4
1991	Finland	WC	9	3	0	3	—
1991	Finland	CC	6	0	1	1	0
Junior totals			19	14	8	22	4
Senior totals			24	5	1	6	4
