= Mika Nieminen =

Finnish ice hockey player

- Born: January 1, 1966 (age 60) Tampere, Finland
- Height: 6 ft 0 in (183 cm)
- Weight: 202 lb (92 kg; 14 st 6 lb)
- Position: Center
- Shot: Right
- Played for: SM-liiga; Ilves; Lukko; Jokerit; HIFK; 1. Divisioona; Reipas; Elitserien; Luleå HF; Nationalliga B Grasshopper
- National team: Finland
- Playing career: 1985–2002
Medal record
Representing Finland
Men's ice hockey
Olympic Games
Bronze medal – third place	1994 Lillehammer	Ice hockey
Bronze medal – third place	1998 Nagano	Ice hockey
World Championships
Silver medal – second place	1992 Czechoslovakia	Ice hockey
Silver medal – second place	1994 Italy	Ice hockey
Gold medal – first place	1995 Sweden	Ice hockey

Mika Sakari Nieminen (born 1 January 1966 in Tampere, Finland) is a retired professional ice hockey player who played in the SM-liiga. He played for Ilves, Jokerit and HIFK. He was inducted into the Finnish Hockey Hall of Fame in 2005.

During the 1994-1995 season, when playing for Luleå HF, he became the top scorer during both the regular Elitserien season and the Swedish national championship play-offs. He never won championships at club level, but he did win the 1995 World Championship with Finland.

== Career statistics ==
=== Regular season and playoffs ===
			Regular season					Playoffs
Season	Team	League	GP	G	A	Pts	PIM	GP	G	A	Pts	PIM
1983–84	Ilves	FIN U20	27	22	15	37	16	—	—	—	—	—
1984–85	Ilves	FIN U20	27	23	17	40	28	—	—	—	—	—
1985–86	Kiekkoreipas	FIN.2	43	25	37	62	67	—	—	—	—	—
1986–87	Kiekkoreipas	FIN.2	44	31	32	63	34	—	—	—	—	—
1987–88	Ilves	SM-l	41	21	20	41	2	4	2	3	5	0
1988–89	Ilves	SM-l	23	10	21	31	14	5	3	6	9	4
1989–90	Ilves	SM-l	25	12	34	46	12	9	2	6	8	4
1990–91	Ilves	SM-l	44	20	42	62	20	—	—	—	—	—
1991–92	Lukko	SM-l	44	17	38	55	16	2	0	0	0	2
1992–93	Luleå HF	SEL	40	17	23	40	28	11	2	2	4	6
1993–94	Luleå HF	SEL	40	14	38	52	24	—	—	—	—	—
1994–95	Luleå HF	SEL	38	18	31	49	26	9	5	8	13	16
1995–96	Grasshopper Club Zürich	SUI.2	36	28	46	74	16	10	4	9	13	4
1996–97	Grasshopper Club Zürich	SUI.2	38	41	33	74	60	10	7	10	17	31
1997–98	Jokerit	SM-l	48	16	25	41	37	—	—	—	—	—
1998–99	HIFK	SM-l	53	20	28	48	12	11	4	7	11	0
1999–2000	HIFK	SM-l	36	15	19	34	42	9	2	6	8	18
2000–01	HIFK	SM-l	50	9	28	37	22	4	1	0	1	0
2001–02	HIFK	SM-l	55	9	12	21	20	3	0	1	1	0
SM-l totals			419	149	267	416	197	47	14	29	43	28
SEL totals			118	49	92	141	78	20	7	10	17	22

=== International ===
Year	Team	Event	GP	G	A	Pts	PIM
1984	Finland	EJC	5	1	0	1	0
1991	Finland	WC	10	5	6	11	2
1992	Finland	OG	8	4	6	10	6
1992	Finland	WC	8	3	5	8	2
1993	Finland	WC	6	0	0	0	2
1994	Finland	OG	8	3	5	8	0
1994	Finland	WC	8	2	3	5	2
1995	Finland	WC	8	4	3	7	6
1996	Finland	WCH	4	2	0	2	2
1996	Finland	WC	6	4	2	6	2
1997	Finland	WC	8	4	3	7	2
1998	Finland	OG	5	1	2	3	2
Senior totals			79	32	35	67	28
