= Steve Peters (ice hockey) =

Canadian ice hockey player (born 1960)

- Born: January 23, 1960 (age 66) Peterborough, Ontario, Canada
- Height: 5 ft 11 in (180 cm)
- Weight: 186 lb (84 kg; 13 st 4 lb)
- Position: Centre
- Shot: Left
- Played for: Colorado Rockies
- NHL draft: 64th overall, 1979; Colorado Rockies
- Playing career: 1980–1991

Steven Alan Peters (born January 23, 1960) is a Canadian former professional ice hockey forward who played two games in the National Hockey League for the Colorado Rockies.

He was picked second overall, one spot ahead of Wayne Gretzky in the 1977 Ontario Major Junior Hockey League draft of 16-year-olds.

As a youth, he played in the 1972 and 1973 Quebec International Pee-Wee Hockey Tournaments with a minor ice hockey team from Peterborough, Ontario.

== Career statistics ==
			Regular season					Playoffs
Season	Team	League	GP	G	A	Pts	PIM	GP	G	A	Pts	PIM
1976–77	Peterborough Petes	OMJHL	62	6	10	16	48	4	1	2	3	8
1977–78	Niagara Falls Flyers	OMJHL	67	18	38	56	49	—	—	—	—	—
1978–79	Oshawa Generals	OMJHL	64	36	56	92	70	5	1	7	8	0
1979–80	Oshawa Generals	OMJHL	21	13	14	27	22	—	—	—	—	—
1979–80	Windsor Spitfires	OMJHL	39	24	30	54	22	16	4	15	19	14
1979–80	Colorado Rockies	NHL	2	0	1	1	0	—	—	—	—	—
1979–80	Fort Worth Texans	CHL	—	—	—	—	—	2	0	0	0	0
1980–81	Muskegon Mohawks	IHL	38	6	20	26	8	3	1	0	1	5
1980–81	Fort Worth Texans	CHL	34	4	5	9	30	—	—	—	—	—
1981–82	Fort Worth Texans	CHL	79	13	28	41	15	—	—	—	—	—
1982–83	Muskegon Mohawks	IHL	80	38	58	96	35	4	0	4	4	2
1983–84	SC Riessersee	Germany	36	18	25	43	54	—	—	—	—	—
1984–85	EHC Chur	NLA	33	13	10	23	—	—	—	—	—	—
1985–86	SaiPa	Liiga	32	6	8	14	58	—	—	—	—	—
1986–87	HIFK	Liiga	40	9	4	13	22	5	1	2	3	4
1987–88	KooKoo	Liiga	44	9	18	27	52	—	—	—	—	—
1987–88	Miami Valley Sabres	AAHL	12	4	4	8	12	—	—	—	—	—
1988–89	Tappara	Liiga	38	5	14	19	28	8	0	0	0	18
1989–90	SaiPa	Liiga	43	4	11	15	28	—	—	—	—	—
1990–91	Imatran Ketterä	I-Divisioona	27	8	8	16	78	—	—	—	—	—
NHL totals			2	0	1	1	0	—	—	—	—	—
Liiga totals			197	33	55	88	188	13	1	2	3	46
