= 1988–89 I-Divisioona season =

The 1988–89 I-Divisioona season was the 15th season of the I-Divisioona, the second level of Finnish ice hockey. 12 teams participated in the league, and JoKP Joensuu won the championship. JoKP Joensuu and Jokerit Helsinki qualified for the promotion/relegation round of the SM-liiga.

== Regular season ==
	Club	GP	W	T	L	GF–GA	Pts
1.	JoKP Joensuu	44	32	4	8	250:137	68
2.	Jokerit Helsinki	44	30	4	10	278:173	64
3.	Kiekko Espoo	44	28	0	16	228:177	56
4.	Kiekko-Reipas Lahti	44	25	2	17	215:175	52
5.	FoPS Forssa	44	26	0	18	277:241	52
6.	Karhu-Kissat	44	22	1	21	220:216	45
7.	Ketterä Imatra	44	21	2	21	216:250	44
8.	KooVee	44	19	4	21	214:211	42
9.	Vaasan Sport	44	17	3	24	250:228	37
10.	TuTo Hockey	44	17	2	25	204:233	36
11.	Peliitat Heinola	44	8	1	35	156:325	17
12.	SaPKo Savonlinna	44	6	3	35	140:282	15
