= 1997–98 I-Divisioona season =

The 1997–98 I-Divisioona season was the 24th season of the I-Divisioona, the second level of Finnish ice hockey. 12 teams participated in the league, and Kärpät Oulu won the championship. The top six teams from the regular season qualified for the promotion and relegation round of the SM-liiga.

== Regular season ==
	Club	GP	W	T	L	GF–GA	Pts
1.	Kärpät Oulu	44	31	5	8	171:99	67
2.	Hermes Kokkola	44	27	6	11	183:113	60
3.	Pelicans Lahti	44	23	8	13	123:90	54
4.	FPS Forssa	44	23	4	17	155:147	50
5.	TuTo Hockey	44	18	8	18	151:156	44
6.	Diskos Jyväskylä	44	18	7	19	141:137	43
7.	SaPKo Savonlinna	44	19	4	21	112:121	42
8.	Vaasan Sport	44	17	6	21	119:148	40
9.	Haukat Järvenpää	44	18	3	23	123:150	39
10.	Karhut	44	18	1	25	138:165	37
11.	Ahmat Hyvinkää	44	10	8	26	106:153	28
12.	Jää-Kotkat Uusikaupunki	44	9	6	29	118:161	24

== Relegation ==
- Ahmat Hyvinkää - KooKoo 3:2 (5:2, 2:4, 3:4, 4:3, 3:0)
- Koo-Vee - Jää-Kotkat Uusikaupunki 2:3 (2:4, 4:3, 1:0, 3:4 OT, 4:5 OT)
