= Antti Aalto (ice hockey) =

Finnish ice hockey player (born 1975)

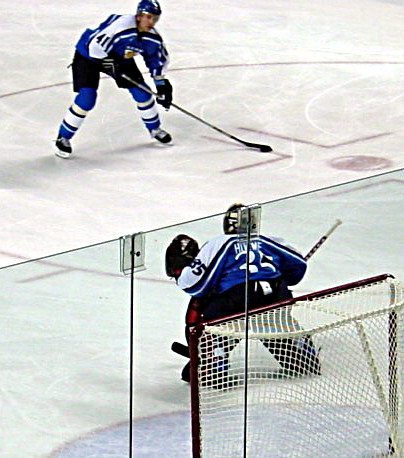
- Annti Aalto
- Born: March 4, 1975 (age 50) Lappeenranta, Finland
- Height: 6 ft 2 in (188 cm)
- Weight: 210 lb (95 kg; 15 st 0 lb)
- Position: Centre
- Shot: Left
- Played for: Mighty Ducks of Anaheim; Cincinnati Mighty Ducks (AHL); TPS (SM-liiga); Jokerit (SM-liiga)
- National team: Finland
- NHL draft: 134th overall, 1993; Mighty Ducks of Anaheim
- Playing career: 1992–2006

Antti Sami Aalto (born March 4, 1975) is a Finnish retired professional ice hockey player who played for the Mighty Ducks of Anaheim in the National Hockey League.

== Playing career ==
Aalto was drafted by the Mighty Ducks of Anaheim in the 1993 NHL Entry Draft in the 6th round, 134th overall. He continued to play in Finland for TPS until the 1997–98 season when he joined the Ducks. He was assigned to their minor hockey team, the Cincinnati Mighty Ducks for 29 games and played for the Ducks for three games. He continued to play in the NHL until the 2000–01 season. The next season, 2001–02, saw Aalto return to Finland, which is where he continued to play until 2006 when he was forced to retire due to a shoulder injury.

== Career statistics ==
=== Regular season and playoffs ===
			Regular season					Playoffs
Season	Team	League	GP	G	A	Pts	PIM	GP	G	A	Pts	PIM
1991–92	SaiPa	FIN.2 U20	13	7	9	16	38	6	3	1	4	6
1991–92	SaiPa	FIN.2	20	6	6	12	20	—	—	—	—	—
1992–93	SaiPa	FIN U18	3	0	1	1	2	—	—	—	—	—
1992–93	SaiPa	FIN.2 U20	3	4	2	6	2	—	—	—	—	—
1992–93	SaiPa	FIN.2	23	6	8	14	14	—	—	—	—	—
1992–93	TPS	FIN U20	14	6	8	14	18	6	2	2	4	8
1992–93	TPS	SM-l	1	0	0	0	0	—	—	—	—	—
1993–94	TPS	FIN U20	10	3	8	11	14	5	1	4	5	0
1993–94	TPS	SM-l	33	5	9	14	16	10	1	1	2	4
1993–94	Kiekko-67	FIN.2	4	2	2	4	27	—	—	—	—	—
1994–95	TPS	FIN U20	2	1	2	3	2	—	—	—	—	—
1994–95	TPS	SM-l	44	11	7	18	18	5	0	1	1	2
1994–95	Kiekko-67	FIN.2	1	0	1	1	29	—	—	—	—	—
1995–96	TPS	SM-l	40	15	16	31	22	11	3	5	8	14
1995–96	Kiekko-67	FIN.2	2	0	2	2	2	—	—	—	—	—
1996–97	TPS	SM-l	44	15	19	34	60	11	5	6	11	31
1997–98	Mighty Ducks of Anaheim	NHL	3	0	0	0	0	—	—	—	—	—
1997–98	Cincinnati Mighty Ducks	AHL	29	4	9	13	30	—	—	—	—	—
1998–99	Mighty Ducks of Anaheim	NHL	73	3	5	8	24	4	0	0	0	2
1999–2000	Mighty Ducks of Anaheim	NHL	63	7	11	18	26	—	—	—	—	—
2000–01	Mighty Ducks of Anaheim	NHL	12	1	1	2	2	—	—	—	—	—
2000–01	Cincinnati Mighty Ducks	AHL	40	14	26	40	39	3	2	1	3	2
2001–02	Jokerit	SM-l	48	8	21	29	87	12	1	8	9	12
2002–03	Jokerit	SM-l	44	7	16	23	36	10	2	1	3	26
2003–04	TPS	SM-l	50	16	28	44	46	13	2	9	11	10
2004–05	TPS	SM-l	37	9	18	27	40	—	—	—	—	—
2005–06	TPS	SM-l	4	1	0	1	4	—	—	—	—	—
SM-l totals			345	87	134	221	329	72	14	31	45	99
NHL totals			151	11	17	28	52	4	0	0	0	2

=== International ===
Year	Team	Event	GP	G	A	Pts	PIM
1992	Finland	U17	—	—	—	—	—
1992	Finland	EJC	6	2	1	3	16
1993	Finland	EJC	6	1	3	4	18
1994	Finland	WJC	7	0	2	2	8
1995	Finland	WJC	7	2	3	5	18
1997	Finland	WC	5	2	0	2	0
2000	Finland	WC	8	0	0	0	6
2002	Finland	OG	4	0	0	0	4
2002	Finland	WC	9	1	0	1	16
Junior totals			26	5	9	14	60
Senior totals			26	3	0	3	26
