= 1989–90 I-Divisioona season =

- Season champions: Porin Ässät
- Runners-up: Hockey-Reipas
- Promoted to SM-liiga: Porin Ässät and Hockey-Reipas
- Relegated to II-Divisioona: Hokki-Salo and KooVee

Seasons
- ← 1988–89 1990–91 →

The 1989–90 I-Divisioona season was the 16th season of the I-Divisioona, the second level of Finnish ice hockey. 12 teams participated in the league, and Ässät Pori won the championship. Ässät Pori and Hockey-Reipas Lahti qualified for the promotion/relegation round of the SM-liiga.

== Regular season ==
	Club	GP	W	T	L	GF–GA	Pts
1.	HC Ässät Pori	44	37	3	4	355:144	77
2.	Hockey-Reipas	44	31	3	10	246:133	65
3.	Oulun Kärpät	44	30	3	11	255:141	63
4.	Forssan Palloseura	44	28	2	14	279:179	58
5.	Karhu-Kissat	44	20	3	21	229:199	43
6.	Vaasan Sport	44	19	5	20	213:236	43
7.	Kiekko-67	44	20	2	22	190:208	42
8.	TuTo Hockey	44	17	2	25	192:257	36
9.	Kiekko-Espoo	44	17	1	26	214:229	35
10.	Imatran Ketterä	44	12	3	29	189:326	27
11.	KooVee	44	10	1	33	166:299	21
12.	Hokki-Salo	44	9	0	35	169:346	18
