= 1996–97 I-Divisioona season =

The 1996–97 I-Divisioona season was the 23rd season of the I-Divisioona, the second level of Finnish ice hockey. 16 teams participated in the league, and Karhut won the championship. The top six teams from the final round qualified for the promotion and relegation round of the SM-liiga.

== Final round ==
	Club	GP	W	T	L	GF–GA	Pts
1.	Karhut	44	26	7	11	194:149	59
2.	Kärpät Oulu	44	26	4	14	196:154	56
3.	Pelicans Lahti	44	26	3	15	168:119	55
4.	Haukat Järvenpää	44	25	5	14	180:142	55
5.	FPS Forssa	44	26	2	16	178:116	54
6.	Hermes Kokkola	44	21	7	16	161:155	49
7.	Ahmat Hyvinkää	44	20	7	17	153:137	47
8.	TuTo Hockey	44	19	3	22	182:156	41

== Qualification round ==
	Club	GP	W	T	L	GF–GA	Pts
9.	SaPKo Savonlinna	44	25	6	13	172:144	56
10.	Jää-Kotkat Uusikaupunki	44	23	3	18	166:144	49
11.	Kiekko-67 Turku	44	19	6	19	135:137	44
12.	Titaanit Kotka	44	19	3	22	153:158	41
13.	PiTa Helsinki	44	15	1	28	142:178	31
14.	Koo-Vee	44	13	4	27	137:199	30
15.	KooKoo Kouvola	44	8	3	33	117:242	19
16.	Ketterä Imarta	44	8	2	34	135:239	18

== Relegation ==
- Kiekko-67 Turku - Vaasan Sport 1:2 (5:3, 2:7, 1:2 OT)
- Diskos Jyväskylä - Titaanit Kotka 2:1 (5:3, 1:2, 4:1)
