= 1978–79 I-Divisioona season =

The 1978–79 I-Divisioona season was the fifth season of the I-Divisioona, the second level of Finnish ice hockey. 10 teams participated in the league, and SaiPa Lapeenranta won the championship. SaiPa Lappeenranta and FoPS Forssa qualified for the promotion/relegation round of the SM-liiga.

== Regular season ==
	Club	GP	W	T	L	GF–GA	Pts
1.	SaiPa Lappeenranta	36	25	4	7	218:121	54
2.	FoPS Forssa	36	21	6	9	212:164	48
3.	JYP Jyväskylä	36	19	7	10	160:141	45
4.	SaPKo Savonlinna	36	19	6	11	183:161	44
5.	Kiekko-67 Turku	36	17	4	15	163:158	38
6.	Jäähonka Espoo	36	14	4	18	121:126	32
7.	KooKoo Kouvola	36	11	9	16	140:181	31
8.	HPK Hämeenlinna	36	12	4	20	151:185	28
9.	Vaasan Sport	36	9	6	21	131:172	24
10.	Mikkelin Jukurit	36	5	6	25	127:197	16
