= 1999–2000 I-Divisioona season =

Final season of the I-Divisioona

The 1999–2000 I-Divisioona season was the 26th and final season of the I-Divisioona, the second level of Finnish ice hockey. The second-level Finnish league became the Mestis for the 2000–01 season. 12 teams participated in the league, and Kärpät Oulu, Vaasan Sport, and Diskos Jyväskylä qualified for the promotion/relegation round of the SM-liiga.

== Regular season ==
	Club	GP	W	T	L	GF–GA	Pts
1.	Kärpät Oulu	48	42	3	3	285:91	87
2.	Vaasan Sport	48	31	5	12	190:116	67
3.	Diskos Jyväskylä	48	24	7	17	178:167	55
4.	TuTo Hockey	48	26	3	19	152:151	55
5.	JoKP Joensuu	48	23	6	19	166:153	52
6.	KooKoo Kouvola	48	22	3	23	155:175	47
7.	Hermes Kokkola	48	19	4	25	155:190	42
8.	FPS Forssa	48	19	2	27	144:169	40
9.	Jää-Kotkat Uusikaupunki	48	19	1	28	144:192	39
10.	Haukat Järvenpää	48	18	1	29	134:177	37
11.	Ahmat Hyvinkää	48	17	2	29	154:185	36
12.	SaPKo Savonlinna	48	8	3	37	134:225	19

== Playoffs ==
=== Final round ===
- Vaasan Sport - Jää-Kotkat Uusikaupunki 2:0 (3:1, 4:3)
- JoKP Joensuu - KooKoo 2:1 (2:0, 2:4, 5:2)
- Diskos Jyväskylä - FPS Forssa 2:1 (3:0, 2:7, 3:0)
- TuTo Hockey - Hermes Kokkola 2:1 (3:2, 0:1, 3:1)

=== Second round ===
- Vaasan Sport - JoKP Joensuu 2:0 (5:1, 2:1)
- Diskos Jyväskylä - TuTo Hockey 2:1 (6:2, 3:7, 5:1)

== Relegation ==
- Mikkelin Jukurit - SaPKo Savonlinna 3:2 (2:6, 1:6, 5:2, 4:1, 4:0)
- Ahmat Hyvinkää - Kiekko Vantaa 1:3 (3:9, 9:2, 3:6, 2:6)
