= 1980–81 I-Divisioona season =

The 1980–81 I-Divisioona season was the seventh season of the I-Divisioona, the second level of Finnish ice hockey. 10 teams participated in the league, and HPK Hämeenlinna won the championship. HPK Hämeenlinna and Koo-Vee qualified for the promotion/relegation round of the SM-liiga.

== Regular season ==
| | Club | GP | W | T | L | GF–GA | Pts |
|---|---|---|---|---|---|---|---|
| 1. | HPK Hämeenlinna | 36 | 27 | 2 | 7 | 294:128 | 56 |
| 2. | Koo-Vee | 36 | 23 | 1 | 12 | 211:151 | 47 |
| 3. | JYP Jyväskylä | 36 | 18 | 8 | 10 | 172:141 | 44 |
| 4. | SaPKo Savonlinna | 36 | 18 | 6 | 12 | 213:158 | 42 |
| 5. | Vaasan Sport | 36 | 19 | 3 | 14 | 177:160 | 41 |
| 6. | KooKoo Kouvola | 36 | 12 | 8 | 16 | 141:168 | 32 |
| 7. | FoPS Forssa | 36 | 14 | 3 | 19 | 141:184 | 31 |
| 8. | Jäähonka Espoo | 36 | 12 | 1 | 23 | 111:209 | 25 |
| 9. | Valtit Varkaus | 36 | 11 | 2 | 23 | 127:202 | 24 |
| 10. | JoKP Joensuu | 36 | 7 | 4 | 25 | 123:209 | 18 |
