= 1977–78 I-Divisioona season =

The 1977–78 I-Divisioona season was the fourth season of the I-Divisioona, the second level of Finnish ice hockey. 10 teams participated in the league, and SaiPa Lapeenranta won the championship. SaiPa Lappeenranta and FoPS Forssa qualified for the promotion/relegation round of the SM-liiga.

== Regular season ==
	Club	GP	W	T	L	GF–GA	Pts
1.	SaiPa Lappeenranta	36	25	3	8	197:118	53
2.	FoPS Forssa	36	24	4	8	224:133	52
3.	HPK Hämeenlinna	36	23	2	11	179:136	48
4.	Vaasan Sport	36	21	4	11	204:123	46
5.	Mikkelin Jukurit	36	12	8	16	158:173	32
6.	JYP Jyväskylä	36	12	5	19	161:179	29
7.	Jäähonka Espoo	36	12	5	19	91:125	29
8.	SaPKo Savonlinna	36	14	0	22	126:207	28
9.	KooKoo Kouvola	36	11	3	22	146:197	25
10.	HJK Helsinki	36	7	4	25	114:209	18
