= Henrik Forsberg (ice hockey) =

Finnish ice hockey defenceman

- Born: September 10, 1985 (age 39); Vaasa, Finland
- Height: 6 ft 0 in (183 cm)
- Weight: 194 lb (88 kg; 13 st 12 lb)
- Position: Defence
- Shot: Left
- Played for: JYP; SaiPa; HIFK; Lukko; HPK; KooKoo
- NHL draft: Undrafted
- Playing career: 2004–2017

Henrik Forsberg (born September 10, 1985) is a Finnish former ice hockey defenceman who playing for HPK in the Finnish Liiga.

Forsberg made his SM-Liiga debut playing with JYP during the 2004–05 SM-liiga season.

== Career statistics ==
			Regular season					Playoffs
Season	Team	League	GP	G	A	Pts	PIM	GP	G	A	Pts	PIM
2000–01	JYP Jyväskylä U16	U16 SM-sarja	13	3	3	6	40	8	2	1	3	10
2001–02	JYP Jyväskylä U18	U18 SM-sarja	27	2	5	7	50	9	0	0	0	8
2003–04	JYP Jyväskylä U20	U20 SM-liiga	20	1	3	4	14	14	2	1	3	14
2004–05	JYP Jyväskylä U20	U20 SM-liiga	30	0	3	3	60	5	0	1	1	10
2004–05	JYP Jyväskylä	SM-liiga	6	0	0	0	6	3	0	0	0	0
2005–06	JYP Jyväskylä U20	U20 SM-liiga	6	0	1	1	18	7	2	1	3	6
2005–06	JYP Jyväskylä	SM-liiga	3	0	0	0	2	—	—	—	—	—
2006–07	JYP Jyväskylä	SM-liiga	49	1	3	4	85	—	—	—	—	—
2007–08	JYP Jyväskylä	SM-liiga	12	0	0	0	16	3	0	1	1	2
2007–08	SaPKo	Mestis	2	0	0	0	10	—	—	—	—	—
2007–08	Vaasan Sport	Mestis	3	0	1	1	2	—	—	—	—	—
2007–08	Mikkelin Jukurit	Mestis	7	1	1	2	16	—	—	—	—	—
2008–09	JYP Jyväskylä	SM-liiga	17	0	0	0	10	—	—	—	—	—
2008–09	D Team	Mestis	24	2	4	6	57	3	0	1	1	12
2009–10	Mikkelin Jukurit	Mestis	34	4	6	10	52	4	0	0	0	4
2010–11	Mikkelin Jukurit	Mestis	42	6	11	17	82	11	2	6	8	14
2010–11	SaiPa	SM-liiga	2	0	1	1	0	—	—	—	—	—
2011–12	KooKoo	Mestis	28	4	4	8	84	6	0	4	4	4
2012–13	Hokki	Mestis	12	2	8	10	28	—	—	—	—	—
2013–14	HC Keski-Uusimaa	Mestis	6	1	3	4	16	—	—	—	—	—
2013–14	HIFK	Liiga	35	3	3	6	14	1	0	0	0	2
2014–15	Lukko	Liiga	46	1	4	5	20	14	2	0	2	4
2014–15	KeuPa HT	Mestis	3	1	1	2	4	—	—	—	—	—
2015–16	HPK	Liiga	53	3	10	13	71	—	—	—	—	—
2016–17	HPK	Liiga	52	1	5	6	54	7	1	0	1	0
Liiga totals			275	9	26	35	278	28	3	1	4	8
