= 1979–80 I-Divisioona season =

The 1979–80 I-Divisioona season was the sixth season of the I-Divisioona, the second tier of Finnish ice hockey. Ten teams competed in the league, and HPK Hämeenlinna won the championship. HPK Hämeenlinna and SaiPa Lappeenranta advanced to the promotion/relegation round of the SM-liiga.

== Regular season ==
	Club	GP	W	T	L	GF–GA	Pts
1.	HPK Hämeenlinna	36	30	1	5	234:114	61
2.	SaiPa Lappeenranta	36	26	2	8	243:112	54
3.	SaPKo Savonlinna	36	25	2	9	217:143	52
4.	Vaasan Sport	36	20	1	15	167:186	41
5.	JYP Jyväskylä	36	14	6	16	190:166	34
6.	FoPS Forssa	36	14	3	19	167:204	31
7.	Jäähonka Espoo	36	14	0	22	131:163	28
8.	KooKoo Kouvola	36	10	3	23	132:211	23
9.	Mikkelin Jukurit	36	9	2	25	147:201	20
10.	Kiekko-67 Turku	36	7	2	27	113:248	16
