= KooKoo (ice hockey) =

- City: Kouvola
- League: Liiga
- Founded: 1965
- Home arena: Lumon arena (capacity: 5,950)
- Colours: Black, orange, white
- Owner: KooKoo Hockey Oy
- General manager: Sakari Välimaa
- Head coach: Kai Suikkanen
- Captain: Otto Paajanen
- Farm club: Kotkan Titaanit
- Website: kookoo.fi
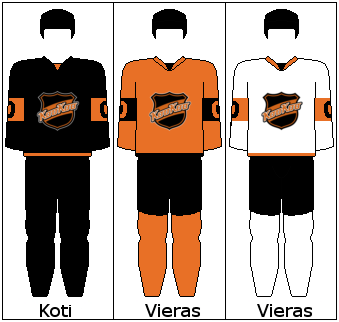

KooKoo is a Finnish ice hockey team playing in the first level of Finnish ice hockey league Liiga. KooKoo plays in the Lumon arena (capacity 5,950), in Kouvola. The team was established in 1965 and the previous name of the club is Kouvolan Kiekko-65.

== Franchise history ==
KooKoo was established by the Kouvolan Pallonlyöjät and Sudet in Kouvola on 3 November 1965. The first official match was played on November 17, 1965 when KooKoo won the Kuusankoski Puhti goals 4–2. A new club for ice hockey skills got plenty from Lappeenranta, where many of its first-year players and coaches came from.

=== Early years ===
KooKoo started its career in the official series of the Association in the 1966–1967 season, when it participated in the Southern Finland division of Maakuntasarja. During the 1967–1968 season, KooKoo played in the Greater Savo division of Maakuntasarja, where it ranked fourth. In the 1969–1970 season, KooKoo ranked second in the Kymenlaakso division and reached the Suomensarja qualifier but wasn't promoted.

=== Time in the I Division ===
KooKoo rise to the second highest level in the series, the Suomensarja for the season 1971–1972. It was also included in the 1974 newly created series, the I Division. In 1982, an ice rink was built in Kouvola, which greatly improved the operating conditions. The first match in November 1982 between KooKoo and SaPKo ended in KooKoo's 7–4 victory in front of over 4,000 spectators. KooKoo was able to attempt qualifying to SM-liiga for the first time in the 1984–1985 season, after ranking third in the season. However, KooKoo didn't make it. During the 1985–1986 season, KooKoo was coached by Reino Ruotsalainen, and was ranked third in the regular season. In the four-team league qualifying, Kookoo also ranked third and was forced to continue in the I Division. In the 1986–1987 season, the club celebrated its first league victory after winning the division's regular season before TuTo Hockey.

=== Time in SM-Liiga ===
KooKoo's first season in the SM-Liiga was difficult. In the spring of 1988, KooKoo played a very tight five-game relegation series with Lahden Kiekkoreipas. The fourth game extended to the overtime until Lasse Tasala settled the match to KooKoo. After that, KooKoo easily retained its place in the crucial fifth match played at home.

In their second season, KooKoo played in the 1988–1989 season with Urpo Ylönen. The team reached its best results as ninth of the league.

The team's last season in the league was very weak and it was relegated back to the first division after losing to the qualifying round for Hockey Reipas.

=== Back to Division and Fall in Division II ===
KooKoo started the 1990s in the first division. In spring 1992–93 SM-Liiga qualifiers, KooKoo was one point away from being promoted to the SM-Liiga for the next season. KooKoo was relegated in 1997 when the first division team was downsized by four. The unambiguous aim of the club was to get back to the first division. The team survived until qualifying, but Hyvinkää Ahmat was better off with 3–2.

=== Back to Division and Mestis ===
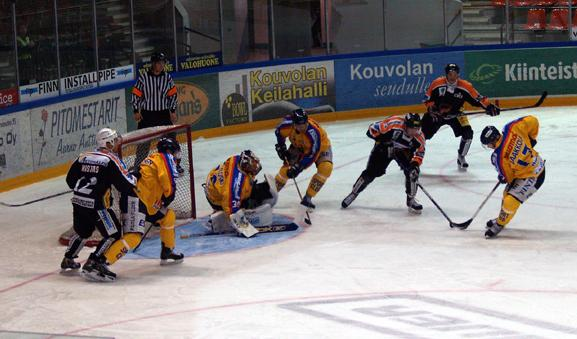
KooKoo plays against Jukurit in 2007.

In the 1998–1999 season, KooKoo came out again in qualifying. It succeeded in winning the Uudenkaupungin Jää-Kotkat in the matches 3-2 and was promoted to the first division after the two-year absence.

In 2000, the team moved to the newly established Mestis. In the spring of 2005, the club announced that it would close down the representation team, but the team with new organization. In 2009–2010 season, KooKoo won the Mestis Regular Series for the first time in 23 years. At the end of the season KooKoo reached bronze medals by winning LeKi 4–2. In the season 2013–2014, KooKoo won Jukurit in finals.

=== Return to the SM-Liiga ===
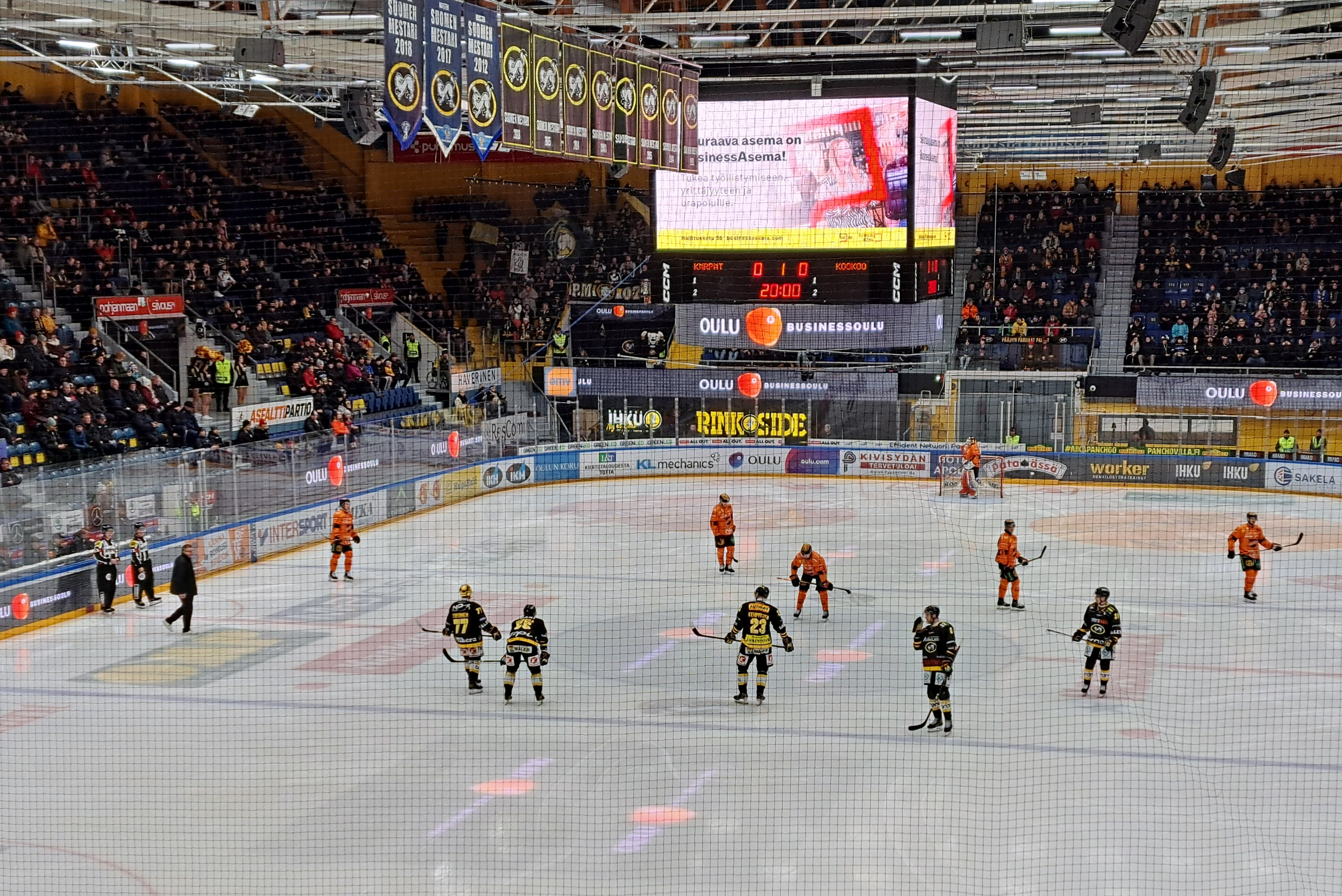
KooKoo against Kärpät in Oulu's Raksila, 2022-23 season

In October 2014, information about KooKoo return to the SM-Liiga for the 2015-2016 season was published.

At the 2017–2018 season, KooKoo made history in the SM-Liiga by leading the series for the first time. At the time, there were 15 teams who had reached the top spot in the regular season.

KooKoo made the 2019–2020 season Kouvola's hockey history for the first time making to the league playoffs. However, the playoffs were not played during the season due to the Coronavirus pandemic. In 2020–2021 season KooKoo reached playoffs Wild-card round against Ilves. KooKoo's season ended in 9th place and Ilves advanced to the quarterfinals.

At the 2021–2022 season, KooKoo advanced for the third time to the playoffs, in Wild-card round ended up against a familiar local opponent Lahti Pelicans. KooKoo's season continued after defeating Pelicans with a total score of 2-1 after two games and KooKoo advanced to the quarterfinals against old Mestis rival Jukurit.

At the 2025–2026 season, KooKoo seals second place in the regular season and qualified for the quarterfinals. KooKoo will also participate in the Champions Hockey League for the first time in the 2026–27 season.

=== Current roster ===
Updated February 2020.

| No. | Nat | Player | Pos | S/G | Age | Acquired | Birthplace |
|---|---|---|---|---|---|---|---|
| 28 | (Finland) | Jesper Ahlroth | D | L | 24 | 2024 | Kokkola, Finland |
| 35 | (Canada) | Antoine Bibeau | G | L | 32 | 2024 | Victoriaville, Quebec, Canada |
| 71 | (Sweden) | Marcus Davidsson | W | L | 27 | 2024 | Tyresö, Sweden |
| 11 | (Sweden) | Petter Emanuelsson | RW | R | 35 | 2023 | Kiurna, Sweden |
| 9 | (United States) | David Farrance | D | L | 27 | 2024 | Victor, New York, United States |
| 55 | (Hungary) | Vilmos Galló | W | L | 30 | 2024 | Budapest, Hungary |
| 17 | (Finland) | Ari Gröndahl | D | R | 37 | 2022 | Helsinki, Finland |
| 19 | (Finland) | Simo Heinonen | RW | L | 23 | 2023 | Kotka, Finland |
| 15 | (Finland) | Ossi-Petteri Jaakola | RW | L | 24 | 2024 | Hamina, Finland |
| 48 | (Norway) | Christian Kåsastul | D | L | 29 | 2024 | Skien, Norway |
| 29 | (Czech Republic) | Radek Koblížek | W | R | 28 | 2023 | Ivančice, Czech Republic |
| 12 | (Finland) | Ville Leskinen | W | R | 32 | 2023 | Oulu, Finland |
| 43 | (Finland) | Kalle Loponen | D | R | 25 | 2024 | Hämeenlinna, Finland |
| 88 | (Estonia) | Robert Rooba (C) | W | L | 33 | 2024 | Tallinn, Estonia |
| 18 | (Finland) | Joonas Oden | W | R | 26 | 2024 | Benton City, Washington, United States |
| 13 | (Finland) | Otto Paajanen | C | L | 34 | 2023 | Loppi, Finland |
| 77 | (Finland) | Ville Puhakka | D | R | 26 | 2024 | Kuopio, Finland |
| 34 | (Finland) | Eetu Randelin | G | L | 24 | 2024 | Espoo, Finland |
| 10 | (Canada) | Riley Sawchuk | C | R | 27 | 2024 | Prince Albert, Saskatchewan, Canada |
| 42 | (Finland) | Jimi Suomi | D | L | 23 | 2024 | Espoo, Finland |
| 46 | (Slovenia) | Matic Török | RW | L | 23 | 2021 | Kranj, Slovenia |
| 20 | (Finland) | Samuel Valkeejärvi | C | L | 25 | 2022 | Jyväskylä, Finland |
| 70 | (Czech Republic) | Stepan Vopravil | G | L | 22 | 2023 | Liberec, Czech Republic |

=== Captains ===
| Name | Seasons |
|---|---|
| Aki Räisänen | 1981-82 |
| Reijo Mansikka | 1982-87 |
| Harri Haapaniemi | 1987-88 |
| Risto Kerminen | 1988-90 |
| Esa Julkunen | 1990-92 |
| Anssi Melametsä | 1992-94 |
| Antti Kuljunen | 1996-97 |
| Mikko Outinen | 1998-99 |
| Jani Luoma-aho | 1999-00 |
| Mikko Liukkonen | 2000-01, 2007-08 |
| Mikko Mattila | 2001-04, 2006-07 |
| Tatu Kattelus | 2004-06 |
| Jarno Kultanen | 2008-10 |
| Pasi Järvinen | 2010-11 |
| Henrik Forsberg | 2011-12 |
| Jarno Lippojoki | 2012-13 |
| Jari Kauppila | 2013-14 |
| Olli Julkunen | 2014-15 |
| Ari Vallin | 2015-16 |
| Josh Green | 2016-17 |
| Toni Kähkönen | 2017-19 |
| Alexander Bonsaksen | 2019-22 |
| Heikki Liedes | 2022-23 |
| Otto Paajanen | 2023-26 |
| Miska Siikonen | 2026- |

== Honours ==
=== Champions ===
- (gold) Mestis (1): 2013-14
- (gold) I-Divisioona (1): 1986-87
- (gold) Maakuntasarja (II-Divisioona) (1): 1972

=== Runners-up ===
- (silver) SM-liiga (1): 2025-26
- (silver) Mestis (3): 2001-02, 2012-13, 2014-15
- (silver) I-Divisioona (Fazer-liiga) (1): 1994–95
- (bronze) Mestis (3): 2002-03, 2009-10, 2011-12
- (bronze) I-Divisioona (5): 1982–83, 1984–85, 1985–86, 1991–92, 1992–93

Other awards for the club:

- Imatra Bauer Tournament winner (1): 2016
- Vaasa Cup winner (1): 2013
- Tampere Cup winner (1): 2021

== Season by season record ==
=== (Since 1972–) ===
| Season | League | GP | W | T | L | OTW | OTL | Pts | GF | GA | Finish | Postseason |
|---|---|---|---|---|---|---|---|---|---|---|---|---|
| 1972–73 | Suomen sarja | 14 | 8 | 0 | 6 | — | — | 16. | 56 | 59 | 3rd | — |
| 1973–74 | Suomen sarja | 14 | 9 | 1 | 4 | — | — | 38. | 84 | 55 | 2nd | Lost in qualifiers |
| 1974–75 | I-Divisioona | 28 | 9 | 5 | 14 | — | — | 23. | 113 | 134 | 6th | — |
| 1975–76 | I-Divisioona | 36 | 16 | 6 | 14 | — | — | 38. | 173 | 170 | 5th | — |
| 1976–77 | I-Divisioona | 36 | 10 | 4 | 22 | — | — | 24. | 152 | 204 | 7th | — |
| 1977–78 | I-Divisioona | 36 | 11 | 3 | 22 | — | — | 25. | 146 | 197 | 9th | Saved in relegation |
| 1978–79 | I-Divisioona | 36 | 11 | 9 | 16 | — | — | 31. | 140 | 181 | 7th | — |
| 1979–80 | I-Divisioona | 36 | 10 | 3 | 23 | — | — | 23. | 132 | 211 | 8th | — |
| 1980–81 | I-Divisioona | 36 | 12 | 8 | 16 | — | — | 22. | 141 | 168 | 6th | — |
| 1981–82 | I-Divisioona | 36 | 9 | 4 | 23 | — | — | 22. | 113 | 152 | 9th | Won relegation, 3–1 (Valtit) |
| 1982–83 | I-Divisioona | 36 | 16 | 8 | 12 | — | — | 40. | 167 | 142 | 3rd | Lost in qualifiers, 0–2 (KalPa) |
| 1983–84 | I-Divisioona | 36 | 16 | 1 | 19 | — | — | 33. | 155 | 174 | 6th | Lost in qualifiers, 1–3 (JyP HT) |
| 1984–85 | I-Divisioona | 44 | 25 | 6 | 13 | — | — | 56. | 194 | 162 | 3rd | Lost in qualifiers |
| 1985–86 | I-Divisioona | 44 | 30 | 3 | 11 | — | — | 63. | 231 | 153 | 3rd | Lost in qualifiers |
| 1986–87 | I-Divisioona | 44 | 36 | 2 | 6 | — | — | 74. | 302 | 137 | 1st | Promoted |
| 1987–88 | SM-liiga | 44 | 7 | 1 | 36 | — | — | 15. | 123 | 252 | 10th | Won relegation, 3–2 (Kiekkoreipas) |
| 1988–89 | SM-liiga | 44 | 16 | 4 | 23 | — | — | 36. | 146 | 194 | 9th | Out of Playoffs |
| 1989–90 | SM-liiga | 44 | 11 | 4 | 29 | — | — | 26. | 146 | 219 | 11th | Relegated, 1–3 (Hockey-Reipas) |
| 1990–91 | I-Divisioona | 44 | 18 | 1 | 25 | — | — | 37. | 191 | 210 | 10th | — |
| 1991–92 | I-Divisioona | 44 | 29 | 3 | 12 | — | — | 61. | 238 | 176 | 3rd | — |
| 1992–93 | I-Divisioona | 44 | 26 | 5 | 13 | — | — | 57. | 220 | 140 | 3rd | Lost in qualifiers |
| 1993–94 | I-Divisioona | 46 | 19 | 5 | 22 | — | — | 43. | 205 | 219 | 7th | — |
| 1994–95 | I-Divisioona | 46 | 27 | 4 | 15 | — | — | 58. | 199 | 157 | 2nd | Lost in qualifiers 1–3 (SaPKo) |
| 1995–96 | I-Divisioona | 44 | 19 | 4 | 21 | — | — | 42. | 187 | 196 | 12th | Lost first round, 1–2 (Hermes) |
| 1996–97 | I-Divisioona | 44 | 8 | 3 | 33 | — | — | 19. | 117 | 242 | 15th | Relegated |
| 1997–98 | II-Divisioona | 32 | 24 | 3 | 5 | — | — | 51. | 217 | 96 | 2nd | Lost in qualifiers, 2–3 (Ahmat) |
| 1998–99 | II-Divisioona | 46 | 21 | 4 | 5 | — | — | 46. | 162 | 88 | 2nd | Won in qualifiers, 3–2 (Jää-Kotkat), Promoted |
| 1999–00 | I-Divisioona | 48 | 22 | 3 | 23 | — | — | 47. | 155 | 175 | 6th | Lost first round, 1–2 (Jokipojat) |
| 2000–01 | Mestis | 44 | 13 | 5 | 26 | — | — | 31. | 100 | 147 | 11th | Saved in relegation |
| 2001–02 | Mestis | 44 | 25 | 5 | 12 | 1 | 1 | 58. | 172 | 124 | 2nd | Lost final, 0–3 (Jukurit) |
| 2002–03 | Mestis | 44 | 25 | 6 | 9 | 3 | 1 | 63. | 168 | 111 | 2nd | Won bronze game, 1–0 (Vaasan Sport) |
| 2003–04 | Mestis | 45 | 22 | — | 15 | 1 | 7 | 53. | 129 | 98 | 5th | Lost bronze game, 0–1 (Hermes) |
| 2004–05 | Mestis | 44 | 10 | — | 22 | 3 | 9 | 35. | 100 | 137 | 10th | Out of Playoffs |
| 2005–06 | Mestis | 45 | 18 | 2 | 17 | 4 | 4 | 50. | 142 | 129 | 5th | Lost quarter-final, 1–3 (Hokki) |
| 2006–07 | Mestis | 45 | 24 | 8 | 11 | 1 | 1 | 59. | 174 | 131 | 5th | Lost quarter-final, 2–3 (Hokki) |
| 2007–08 | Mestis | 45 | 26 | — | 16 | 1 | 2 | 82. | 151 | 112 | 4th | Lost bronze game, 0–1 (Jukurit) |
| 2008–09 | Mestis | 45 | 22 | — | 13 | 5 | 5 | 81 | 149 | 123 | 4th | Lost quarter-final, 2–3 (TuTo Hockey) |
| 2009–10 | Mestis | 45 | 24 | — | 11 | 5 | 6 | 87. | 156 | 120 | 1st | Won bronze game, 1–0 (LeKi) |
| 2010–11 | Mestis | 49 | 31 | — | 11 | 3 | 4 | 103. | 169 | 102 | 2nd | Lost bronze game, 0–1 (D Team) |
| 2011–12 | Mestis | 46 | 25 | — | 8 | 3 | 10 | 91. | 121 | 94 | 2nd | Won bronze game, 1–0 (Jukurit) |
| 2012–13 | Mestis | 48 | 20 | — | 16 | 7 | 5 | 79. | 142 | 133 | 5th | Lost final, 0–3 (Jukurit) |
| 2013–14 | Mestis | 56 | 26 | — | 14 | 5 | 11 | 99. | 163 | 135 | 3rd | Won final, 4–1 (Jukurit) |
| 2014–15 | Mestis | 56 | 32 | — | 15 | 4 | 5 | 109. | 191 | 126 | 2nd | Lost final, 1–4 (Jukurit) |
| 2015–16 | SM-liiga | 60 | 16 | — | 24 | 10 | 10 | 78. | 129 | 159 | 11th | Out of Playoffs |
| 2016–17 | SM-liiga | 60 | 15 | — | 27 | 7 | 11 | 70. | 137 | 173 | 13th | Out of Playoffs |
| 2017–18 | SM-liiga | 60 | 14 | — | 31 | 5 | 10 | 62. | 142 | 198 | 14th | Out of Playoffs |
| 2018–19 | SM-liiga | 60 | 18 | — | 29 | 6 | 7 | 73. | 157 | 197 | 13th | Out of Playoffs |
| 2019–20 | SM-liiga | 59 | 30 | — | 16 | 7 | 6 | 110. | 172 | 129 | 5th | Cancelled due to COVID19 |
| 2020–21 | SM-liiga | 55 | 25 | 11 | 19 | — | — | 91. | 165 | 125 | 9th | Lost first round, Agg. 4–6 (Ilves) |
| 2021–22 | SM-liiga | 60 | 25 | — | 21 | 5 | 9 | 94. | 148 | 141 | 8th | Lost bronze game, 0–1 (Ilves) |
| 2022–23 | SM-liiga | 60 | 19 | — | 25 | 11 | 5 | 84. | 155 | 167 | 10th | Lost quarter-final, 0–4 (Tappara) |
| 2023–24 | SM-liiga | 60 | 17 | — | 26 | 11 | 6 | 79. | 175 | 178 | 12th | Out of Playoffs |
| 2024–25 | SM-liiga | 60 | 23 | — | 20 | 13 | 4 | 99. | 206 | 169 | 6th | Lost first round, 1–3 (Vaasan Sport) |
| 2025–26 | SM-liiga | 60 | 33 | — | 18 | 7 | 2 | 115. | 217 | 155 | 2nd | Lost final, 3–4 (Tappara) |
| 2026–27 | SM-liiga | | | — | | | | | | | | |

=== NHL alumni ===
- (Finland) Mika Alatalo
- (Finland) Hannu Kamppuri
- (Finland) Marko Kiprusoff
- (Finland) Jarno Kultanen
- (Finland) Anssi Melametsä
- (Finland) Jarmo Myllys
- (Finland) Joni Ortio
- (Finland) Petri Varis
- (Canada) Antoine Bibeau
- (Canada) Brett Carson
- (Canada) Charle-Edouard D'Astous
- (Canada) Josh Green
- (Canada) Leland Irving
- (Canada) Christian Thomas
- (Canada) Gary Yaremchuk
- (Canada) Jim Leavins
- (Canada) Steve Peters
- (Canada) Matt Watkins
- (United States) Tommy Wingels
- (United States) David Farrance
- (Germany) Niklas Treutle
- (Czech Republic) Libor Šulák

=== Other former notable players ===
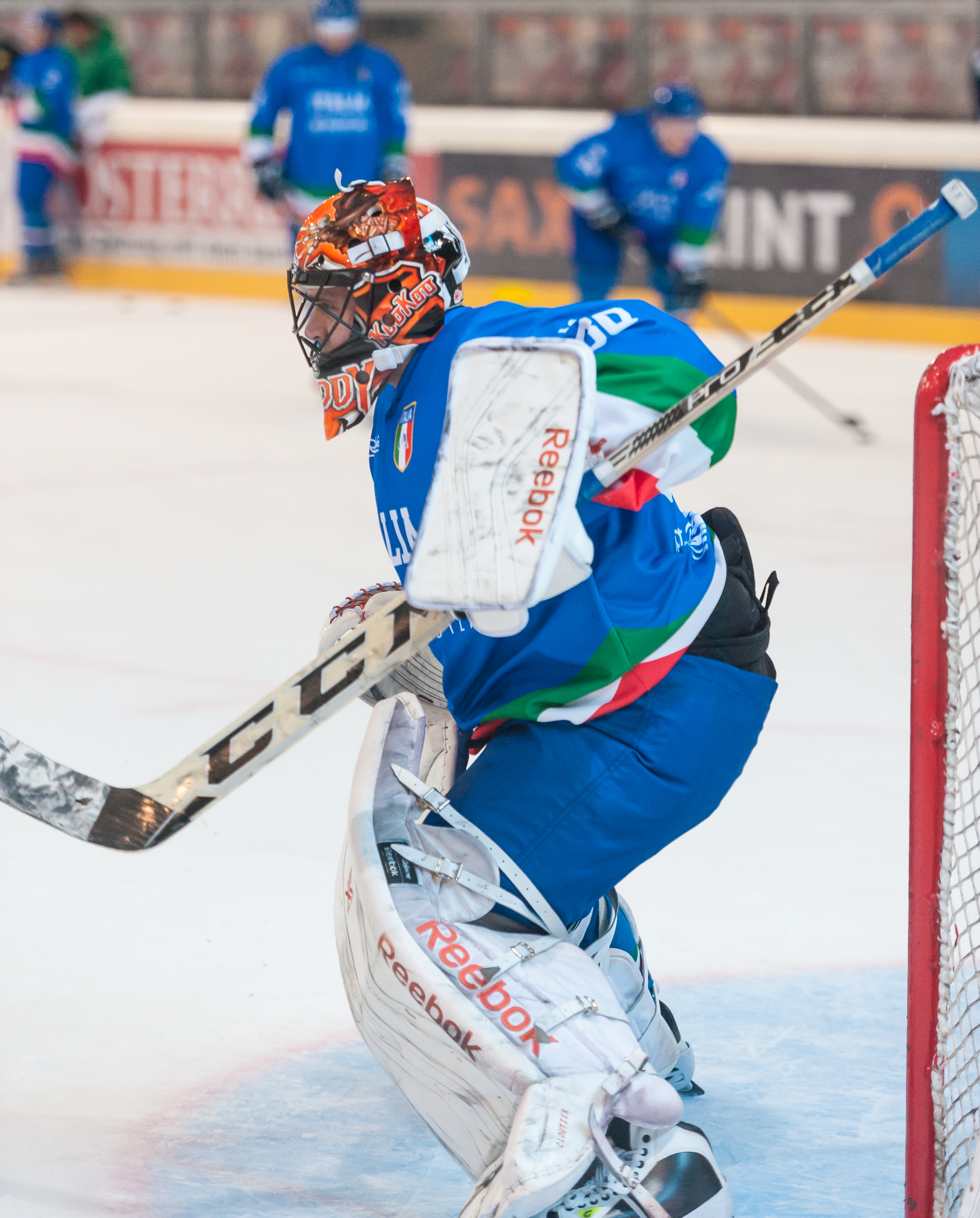
Frédéric Cloutier

- (Russia) / (Soviet Union) Viktor Tyumenev
- (Finland) / (Estonia) Siim Liivik
- (Canada) / (Italy) Frederic Cloutier
- (Finland) Reino Soijärvi
- (Norway) Alexander Bonsaksen
- (Sweden) Malte Strömwall
- (Finland) Timo Susi
- (Finland) Ari Vallin
- (Finland) Juha-Pekka Haataja

== Retired numbers ==
Kouvola KooKoo retired numbers
| No | Player |
|---|---|
| 36 | Mikko Outinen |
| 81 | Timo Nurmberg |
