= Ortio =

Ortio is a surname. Notable people with the surname include:

- Joni Ortio (born 1991), Finnish ice hockey goaltender
- Kai Ortio (born 1965), Finnish ice hockey coach and former ice hockey defenceman
