= 1982–83 I-Divisioona season =

The 1982–83 I-Divisioona season was the ninth season of the I-Divisioona, the second level of Finnish ice hockey. 10 teams participated in the league, and HPK Hämeenlinna and JoKP Joensuu qualified for the promotion/relegation round of the SM-liiga.

== Regular season ==
	Club	GP	W	T	L	GF–GA	Pts
1.	HPK Hämeenlinna	36	25	0	11	225:141	50
2.	JoKP Joensuu	36	23	3	10	184:121	49
3.	KooKoo Kouvola	36	16	8	12	167:142	40
4.	JYP Jyväskylä	36	18	3	15	150:167	39
5.	Koo-Vee	36	17	2	17	163:159	36
6.	KalPa Kuopio	36	17	2	17	146:149	36
7.	Vaasan Sport	36	15	3	18	165:156	33
8.	FoPS Forssa	36	14	2	20	178:205	30
9.	Ketterä Imatra	36	14	1	21	151:178	29
10.	SaPKo Savonlinna	36	7	4	25	121:232	18

== Playoffs ==
=== First round ===
- JYP Jyväskylä - Koo-Vee 2:1 (4:2, 1:2, 10:0)
- KooKoo - KalPa Kuopio 0:2 (3:4, 2:6)

=== Second round ===
- HPK Hämeenlinna - JYP Jyväskylä 3:0 (6:2, 6:1, 8:2)
- JoKP Joensuu - KalPa Kuopio 3:1 (13:2, 3:4, 6:5, 9:2)
