= Antti Aalto =

Antti Aalto may refer to:

- Antti Aalto (ice hockey) (born 1975), Finnish ice hockey player
- Antti Aalto (ski jumper) (born 1995), Finnish ski jumper
