= 2013–14 Mestis season =

2013–14 Mestis
- League: Mestis
- Sport: Ice hockey
- Duration: September 2013 – March 2014
- Teams: 12

Regular season
- Best record: TUTO Hockey
- Runners-up: Sport

Playoffs
- Finals champions: KooKoo
- Runners-up: Jukurit

Mestis seasons
- ← 2012–13 2014–15 →

The 2013–14 Mestis season was the 14th season of the Mestis, the second level of ice hockey in Finland. 12 teams participated in the league.

== Regular season ==
Pos	Team	Pld	W	OTW	OTL	L	GF	GA	GD	Pts	Final Result
1	TUTO Hockey	56	28	12	4	12	181	129	+52	112	Advance to playoffs
2	Sport	56	27	11	6	12	195	161	+34	109	Advance to playoffs
3	KooKoo	56	26	5	11	14	163	135	+28	99	Advance to playoffs
4	HCK	56	24	7	6	19	191	169	+22	92	Advance to playoffs
5	Hokki	56	22	8	5	21	186	165	+21	87	Advance to playoffs
6	Jokipojat	56	22	5	6	23	152	150	+2	82	Advance to playoffs
7	Jukurit	56	17	9	12	18	151	151	0	81	Advance to playoffs
8	Kiekko-Vantaa	56	18	9	4	25	148	157	−9	76	Advance to playoffs
9	JYP-Akatemia	56	16	8	8	24	145	165	−20	72	
10	Peliitat	59	14	7	11	27	151	193	−42	67	
11	SaPKo	56	17	3	9	27	130	168	−38	66	
12	LeKi	56	16	5	7	28	159	210	−51	65	

Source: Eliteprospects.com

== Playoffs ==
Quarterfinals
1	TUTO Hockey	4
8	Kiekko-Vantaa	1
2	Sport	3
7	Jukurit	4
3	KooKoo	4
6	Jokipojat	1
4	HCK	0
5	Hokki	4

Semifinals
1	TUTO Hockey	3
7	Jukurit	4
3	KooKoo	4
5	Hokki	3

Finals
3	KooKoo	4
7	Jukurit	1
Third place
1	TUTO Hockey	1
5	Hokki	0

== SM-Liiga promotion ==
Vaasan Sport was promoted to SM-liiga at the end of the season.

== Qualification ==
Due to Sport gaining a place in the Liiga there were no qualifications and the winner of Suomi-sarja was allowed to apply for a place in Mestis for the next season.
