= 1994–95 I-Divisioona season =

The 1994–95 I-Divisioona season was the 21st season of the I-Divisioona, the second level of Finnish ice hockey. 12 teams participated in the league, and SaiPa Lappeenranta won the championship.

== Regular season ==
	Club	GP	W	T	L	GF–GA	Pts
1.	SaiPa Lappeenranta	28	20	0	8	145:78	40
2.	KooKoo Kouvola	28	18	2	8	121:87	38
3.	SaPKo Savonlinna	28	16	3	9	97:70	35
4.	Kiekko-67 Turku	28	14	4	10	102:88	32
5.	FoPS Forssa	28	15	0	13	154:120	30
6.	Reipas Lahti	28	12	3	13	96:123	27
7.	Haukat Järvenpää	28	11	4	13	93:119	26
8.	Junkkarit Kalajoki	28	11	1	16	107:140	23
9.	Hermes Kokkola	28	16	0	12	124:98	22
10.	Koo-Vee	28	10	0	18	93:119	20
11.	Karhu-Kissat	28	7	3	18	76:115	17
12.	Ketterä Imatra	28	7	2	19	98:149	16
