= Anssi Virkki =

Finnish ice hockey player

- Born: February 9, 1989 (age 36) Savonlinna, Finland
- Height: 6 ft 2 in (188 cm)
- Weight: 209 lb (95 kg; 14 st 13 lb)
- Position: Defence
- Shot: Left
- Played for: Lahti Pelicans; Pori Ässät; TUTO Hockey
- NHL draft: Undrafted
- Playing career: 2006–2018

Anssi Virkki (born February 9, 1989) is a Finnish ice hockey defenceman. He is currently playing with TUTO Hockey in the Finnish Mestis.

Virkki made his SM-liiga debut playing with Lahti Pelicans during the 2011–12 SM-liiga season.
