= 1987–88 I-Divisioona season =

The 1987–88 I-Divisioona season was the 14th season of the I-Divisioona, the second level of Finnish ice hockey. 12 teams participated in the league, and HPK Hämeenlinna won the championship. HPK Hämeenlinna, SaiPa Lappeenranta, and Kiekko-Reipas Lahti qualified for the promotion/relegation round of the SM-liiga.

== Regular season ==
	Club	GP	W	T	L	GF–GA	Pts
1.	HPK Hämeenlinna	44	36	2	6	302:98	74
2.	SaiPa Lappeenranta	44	30	3	11	239:166	63
3.	Kiekko-Reipas Lahti	44	27	4	13	212:161	58
4.	JoKP Joensuu	44	28	0	16	217:173	56
5.	Vaasan Sport	44	25	0	19	218:173	50
6.	TuTo Hockey	44	23	3	18	236:224	49
7.	Jokerit Helsinki	44	20	6	18	193:182	46
8.	SaPKo Savonlinna	44	15	4	25	191:230	34
9.	Ketterä Imatra	44	16	0	28	191:243	32
10.	FoPS Forssa	44	13	2	29	185:276	28
11.	Karhu-Kissat	44	13	1	30	175:267	27
12.	VaKi Vantaa	44	4	3	37	123:289	11
