= 1976–77 I-Divisioona season =

The 1976–77 I-Divisioona season was the third season of the I-Divisioona, the second level of Finnish ice hockey. 10 teams participated in the league, and Kärpät Oulu won the championship. Kärpät Oulu and Vaasan Sport qualified for the promotion/relegation round of the SM-liiga.

== Regular season ==
	Club	GP	W	T	L	GF–GA	Pts
1.	Kärpät Oulu	36	31	1	4	291:111	63
2.	Vaasan Sport	36	27	3	6	256:136	57
3.	SaiPa Lappeenranta	36	25	4	7	230:111	54
4.	HPK Hämeenlinna	36	21	2	13	189:146	44
5.	Jäähonka Espoo	36	11	5	20	110:218	27
6.	JYP Jyväskylä	36	11	3	22	137:199	25
7.	KooKoo Kouvola	36	10	4	22	152:204	24
8.	SaPKo Savonlinna	36	11	2	23	117:186	24
9.	Mikkelin Jukurit	36	10	3	23	133:190	23
10.	PiTa Helsinki	36	8	3	25	140:255	19
