= Alexander Bonsaksen =

Norwegian ice hockey player (born 1987)

- Born: January 24, 1987 (age 38); Oslo, Norway
- Height: 5 ft 11 in (180 cm)
- Weight: 185 lb (84 kg; 13 st 3 lb)
- Position: Defence
- Shoots: Left
- Fjordkraftligaen team Former teams: Frisk Asker; Vålerenga; Modo Hockey; Rögle BK; Tappara; Iserlohn Roosters; KooKoo
- National team: Norway
- Playing career: 2005–present

Alexander Bonsaksen
Medal record

Men's ice hockey

Liiga
Gold medal – first place	2016	Team
Gold medal – first place	2017	Team
Silver medal – second place	2015	Team

GET-ligaen
Gold medal – first place	2006	Team
Gold medal – first place	2007	Team
Gold medal – first place	2009	Team

Alexander Bonsaksen (born January 24, 1987) is a Norwegian professional ice hockey defenceman. He is currently playing with KooKoo in the Finnish Liiga.

== Playing career ==
Bonsaksen joined the Vålerenga Ishockey organization in 2003, playing with their junior team in parts of three seasons. He made his professional debut in the GET-ligaen during the 2005–06 season. He played for Vålerenga until 2009, before moving to Sweden, where he played for Modo, Sundsvall and Rögle. He returned to Vålerenga before the 2013-14 season.

After his third season in 2016–17, with Tappara of the Finnish Liiga, Bonsaksen left as a free agent to sign a one-year contract in Germany with the Iserlohn Roosters of the DEL on April 28, 2017.

Bonsaksen was named the captain of KooKoo before the start of 2019–20 Liiga season.

== International play ==
Bonsaksen was selected to play for the Norway men's national ice hockey team at the 2010 Winter Olympics, 2014 Winter Olympics, 2018 Winter Olympics. He has previously represented Norway at the IIHF World U18 Championships: 2005 IIHF World U18 Championship Division I. IIHF World U20 Championship: 2006, and 2007. World Ice Hockey Championships: 2009, 2010, 2011, 2012, 2013, 2014, 2015, 2017, 2018 and 2019.

== Personal life ==
On July 27, 2018, Bonsaksen got engaged to snowboarder Silje Norendal. In 2021, she gave birth to their first child, Bianca.

== Career statistics ==
=== Regular season and playoffs ===
			Regular season					Playoffs
Season	Team	League	GP	G	A	Pts	PIM	GP	G	A	Pts	PIM
2003–04	Vålerenga Ishockey	NOR U19	27	1	1	2	12	—	—	—	—	—
2004–05	Vålerenga Ishockey	NOR U19	25	3	4	7	34	—	—	—	—	—
2005–06	Vålerenga Ishockey	NOR	40	0	3	3	30	6	0	1	1	2
2006–07	Vålerenga Ishockey	NOR	42	1	7	8	95	15	0	2	2	22
2007–08	Vålerenga Ishockey	NOR	36	1	5	6	46	10	1	0	1	14
2008–09	Vålerenga Ishockey	NOR	45	3	11	14	40	17	0	0	0	56
2009–10	Modo Hockey	J20	2	0	0	0	0	—	—	—	—	—
2009–10	Modo Hockey	SEL	48	0	2	2	20	—	—	—	—	—
2010–11	Modo Hockey	J20	1	0	0	0	2	—	—	—	—	—
2010–11	Modo Hockey	SEL	31	0	2	2	6	—	—	—	—	—
2010–11	IF Sundsvall Hockey	Allsv	23	1	3	4	24	—	—	—	—	—
2011–12	Rögle BK	Allsv	52	4	8	12	69	10	0	0	0	2
2012–13	Rögle BK	SEL	55	1	4	5	56	—	—	—	—	—
2013–14	Vålerenga Ishockey	NOR	41	5	24	29	110	18	0	10	10	12
2014–15	Vålerenga Ishockey	NOR	21	2	7	9	22	—	—	—	—	—
2014–15	Tappara	Liiga	36	1	6	7	12	20	1	2	3	14
2015–16	Tappara	Liiga	57	2	8	10	34	16	0	0	0	12
2016–17	Tappara	Liiga	50	4	12	16	50	17	0	2	2	8
2017–18	Iserlohn Roosters	DEL	40	1	8	9	26	2	0	0	0	4
2018–19	KooKoo	Liiga	53	0	10	10	44	—	—	—	—	—
2019–20	KooKoo	Liiga	46	2	4	6	44	—	—	—	—	—
2020–21	KooKoo	Liiga	43	2	7	9	42	—	—	—	—	—
2021–22	KooKoo	Liiga	37	1	4	5	46	16	0	1	1	16
NOR totals			225	12	57	69	343	66	1	13	14	106
SEL totals			134	1	8	9	82	—	—	—	—	—
Liiga totals			322	12	57	69	343	69	1	5	6	50

=== International ===
Year	Team	Event	GP	G	A	Pts	PIM
2005	Norway	WJC18 D1	5	2	1	3	10
2006	Norway	WJC	6	0	0	0	20
2007	Norway	WJC D1	5	1	2	3	8
2009	Norway	OGQ	3	0	0	0	0
2009	Norway	WC	6	0	0	0	4
2010	Norway	OG	4	0	0	0	2
2010	Norway	WC	6	0	0	0	6
2011	Norway	WC	7	0	2	2	6
2012	Norway	WC	8	0	1	1	0
2013	Norway	WC	7	0	1	1	2
2014	Norway	OG	4	0	0	0	8
2014	Norway	WC	7	1	0	1	4
2015	Norway	WC	7	0	1	1	14
2017	Norway	WC	7	0	1	1	4
2018	Norway	OG	5	2	0	2	6
2018	Norway	WC	7	1	1	2	4
2019	Norway	WC	7	0	1	1	18
Junior totals			16	3	3	6	38
Senior totals			85	4	8	12	78
