= HC Indians =

Former ice hockey team in Kaarina, Finland

- City: Kaarina, Finland
- League: Suomi-sarja
- Founded: 1986
- Operated: 1986–2023
- Home arena: D-Gate Areena (capacity: 400)
- Colours
- Affiliates: TUTO Hockey

Franchise history
- 1984–2014: Kaarinan Kiekko-Pojat
- 2014–2023: HC Indians

HC Indians is an ice hockey club from Kaarina, Finland. At its best, the team played in the Suomi-sarja, the 3rd level of ice hockey in Finland. The club was previously known as the Kaarinan Kiekko-Pojat or KaKiPo.

KaKiPo won the II-divisioona West Coast championship four times, the last of which decided the team's promotion to the Suomi-sarja in the spring of 2014. After its promotion to the league in 2014, KaKiPo transferred the activities of its representative team to the newly established club and changed its name to HC Indians Kaarina. Junior activities continued at KaKiPo.

HC Indians Kaarina ceased operations in September 2023, just one day before the start of the 2023–24 Suomi-sarja season. The reason was said to be the economic situation and the lack of players and background staff.
