= 1983–84 I-Divisioona season =

The 1983–84 I-Divisioona season was the tenth season of the I-Divisioona, the second level of Finnish ice hockey. 10 teams participated in the league, and Lukko Rauma won the championship. Lukko Rauma and JYP Jyväskylä qualified for the promotion/relegation round of the SM-liiga.

== Regular season ==
| | Club | GP | W | T | L | GF–GA | Pts |
|---|---|---|---|---|---|---|---|
| 1. | Lukko Rauma | 36 | 27 | 2 | 7 | 187:117 | 56 |
| 2. | JYP Jyväskylä | 36 | 26 | 3 | 7 | 213:94 | 55 |
| 3. | JoKP Joensuu | 36 | 24 | 4 | 8 | 212:135 | 52 |
| 4. | TuTo Hockey | 36 | 14 | 8 | 14 | 140:154 | 36 |
| 5. | KalPa Kuopio | 36 | 15 | 4 | 17 | 140:134 | 34 |
| 6. | KooKoo Kouvola | 36 | 16 | 1 | 19 | 155:174 | 33 |
| 7. | Ketterä Imatra | 36 | 14 | 2 | 20 | 134:175 | 30 |
| 8. | Peliitat Heinola | 36 | 12 | 1 | 23 | 150:209 | 25 |
| 9. | Vaasan Sport | 36 | 9 | 3 | 24 | 138:179 | 21 |
| 10. | FoPS Forssa | 36 | 9 | 0 | 27 | 148:246 | 18 |

== Playoffs ==
=== First round ===
- JoKP - KooKoo 1:2
- TuTo - KalPa 1:2

=== Second round ===
- JyP HT - KooKoo 3:1
- Lukko - KalPa 3:0

=== Final round ===
- Kiekkoreipas - JyP HT 3:1
- HPK - Lukko 2:3
