= Joni Ortio =

Finnish ice hockey player (born 1991)

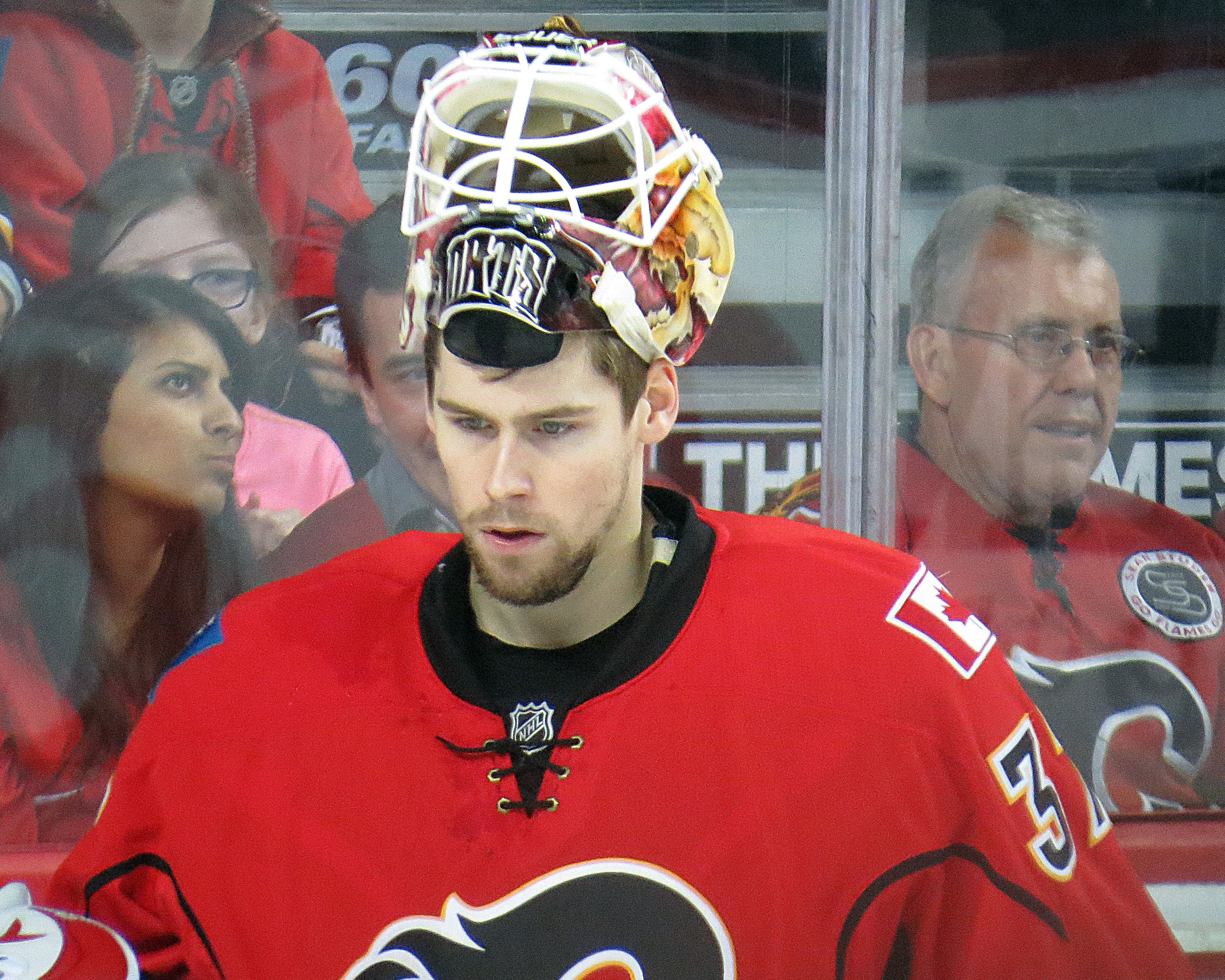
- Ortio with the Calgary Flames in 2014
- Born: April 16, 1991 (age 35) Turku, Finland
- Height: 6 ft 1 in (185 cm)
- Weight: 187 lb (85 kg; 13 st 5 lb)
- Position: Goaltender
- Catches: Left
- Liiga team Former teams: HC Ässät Pori; TPS; HIFK Helsinki; Calgary Flames; Skellefteå AIK; HC Vityaz; ZSC Lions; Barys Nur-Sultan; HV71
- National team: Finland
- NHL draft: 171st overall, 2009; Calgary Flames
- Playing career: 2009–present

Joni Ortio (born April 16, 1991) is a Finnish professional ice hockey goaltender who plays for HC Ässät Pori of the Finnish Elite League. He has previously played for the Calgary Flames of the National Hockey League (NHL). He was a sixth-round selection of the Flames, 171st overall, at the 2009 NHL entry draft. Before the NHL he played for TPS and HIFK Helsinki in the SM-liiga. Internationally, Ortio has represented Finland. He was a member of the bronze medal-winning team at the 2009 IIHF World U18 Championships and played in the 2013 World Championship

== Playing career ==
=== SM-liiga ===
A native of Turku, Finland, Ortio played junior hockey for his hometown team, TPS. He appeared in 26 games in Finland's junior league in 2008–09 and recorded an 18–8 record with a 2.63 goals against average (GAA). He made his first appearance with the Finnish national team, as he recorded three wins and one shutout to help the under-18 team win the bronze medal at the 2009 IIHF World U18 Championships. The National Hockey League (NHL)'s Calgary Flames to select him with their sixth round selection, 171st overall, at the 2009 NHL entry draft.

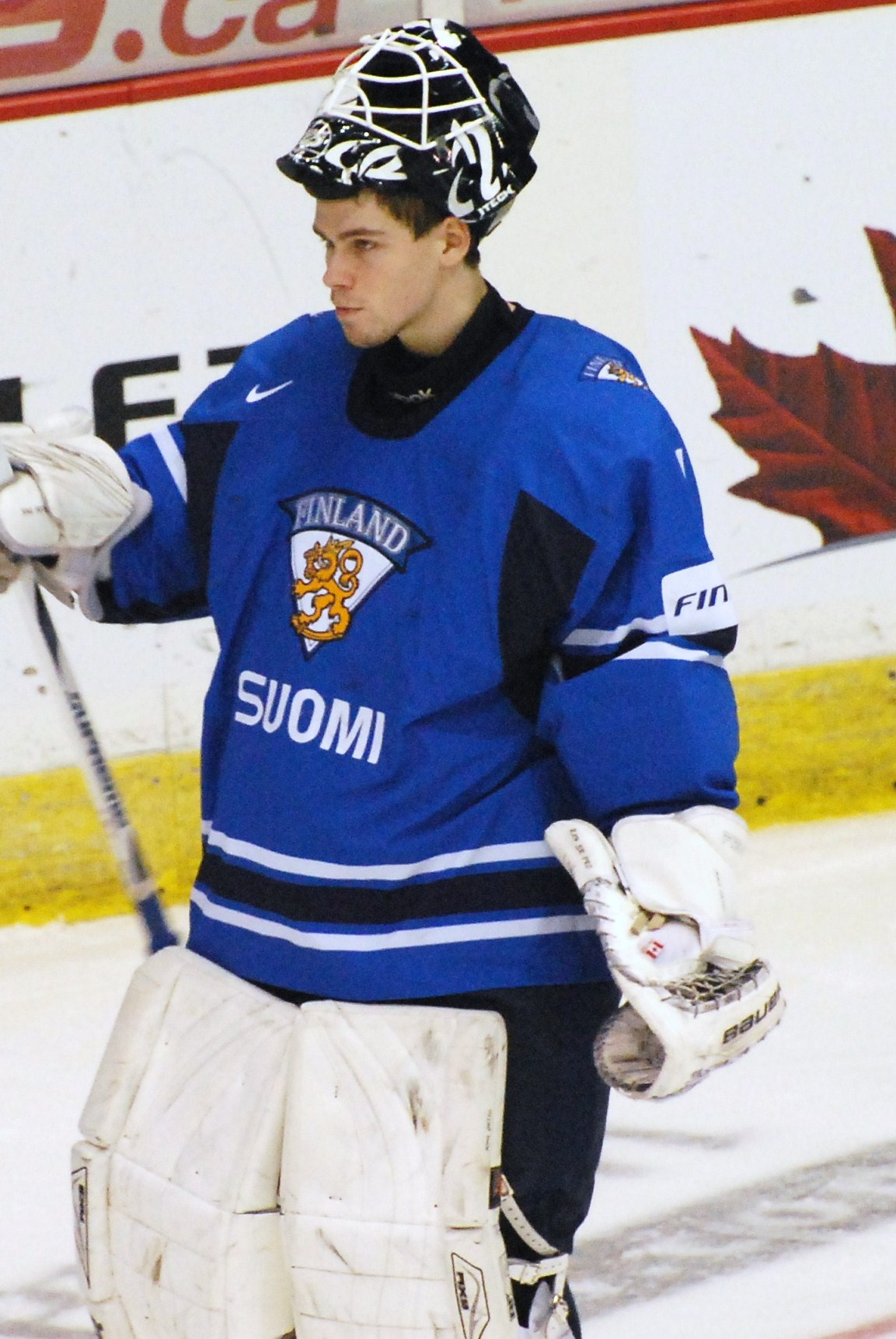
Ortio playing for Finland in the 2009 World Junior Ice Hockey Championships

Ortio remained in Finland for the 2009–10 season where he appeared in 30 junior games. He also made his SM-liiga debut with TPS as he played three games and won one. Moving up to the national junior team, Ortio made two appearances at the World Junior Hockey Championship winning three games at both the 2010 and 2011 tournaments for Finland as the nation finished 5th and 6th, respectively. He played 15 games with TPS in the SM-liiga in 2010–11 before moving to North America. Ortio was assigned to Calgary's American Hockey League (AHL) affiliate, the Abbotsford Heat. He made his North American debut on April 10, 2011, against the Toronto Marlies, but lost 6–0. He began the 2011–12 AHL season with Abbotsford, but after nine games was reassigned on loan back to TPS in the SM-liiga. Ortio admitted that he had not been ready to play in North America at that time.

Moving to HIFK Helsinki for the 2012–13 SM-liiga season, Ortio was the team's starting goaltender and appeared in 53 games. He recorded a 23–20–9 record with a 2.42 GAA and four shutouts. Making his debut with the Finnish senior team, Ortio appeared in three games at the 2013 IIHF World Championship. He won all three and recorded a GAA of 1.98.

=== National Hockey League ===
Ortio returned to North America in 2013–14 and after playing four games with the ECHL's Alaska Aces, won his first nine decisions in the AHL with Abbotsford. By midseason, he had posted a 19–5–0 record and earned his first recall to the NHL on February 3, 2014, after Calgary's starting goaltender Karri Rämö suffered an injury. Ortio made his NHL debut with the Flames on Feb 27, 2014, in a 2–0 loss to the Los Angeles Kings at the Scotiabank Saddledome. His first NHL victory came in his second game, a 4–1 win over the Ottawa Senators on March 5. Ortio posted a record of four wins and four losses in nine games with the Flames before finishing the season with the Heat; he won 27 of the 37 AHL games he played and was named to the AHL's All-Rookie Team.

Returning to the AHL to begin the 2014–15 season, Ortio joined the newly relocated Adirondack Flames. He won 17 games by mid-season, and with a .916 save percentage, was named to play in the AHL All-Star Game before injury again led to his recall to Calgary. Ortio made his season debut with the Flames on January 10, 2015, against the Vancouver Canucks and recorded his first career NHL shutout in a 1–0 victory.

=== Return to Europe ===
On September 7, 2016, Ortio signed a contract to play for Skellefteå AIK of the Swedish Hockey League for the 2016–17 season. Ortio enjoyed two successful seasons with Skellefteå, helping the club return to the Le Mat Trophy finals in the 2017–18 season.

As a free agent, Ortio left the SHL after two seasons, opting to sign a one-year contract with Russian outfit, HC Vityaz of the Kontinental Hockey League on May 8, 2018. As Vityaz' first choice goaltender for the 2018–19 season, Ortio made 52 regular season appearances, collecting 24 wins, in helping Vityaz reach the playoffs for just the second time in franchise history.

On 3 October 2019, Ortio as a free agent continued his professional career in Switzerland, agreeing to a one-year contract with the ZSC Lions of the National League (NL). In the following 2019–20 season, Ortio made 21 appearances with the Zurich-based club, posting 2.38 goals against average before the remainder of the season was cancelled due to the COVID-19 pandemic.

Ortio left Switzerland after just one season, returning to the KHL by agreeing to a one-year contract with Kazakh club, Barys Nur-Sultan, on 29 May 2020. In the 2021–22 season, Ortio appeared in 39 regular season games as Barys starting goaltender and posted a 15–18–5 record.

Following a first-round defeat in the post-season, Ortio left the KHL and signed for a second stint in the SHL, by agreeing to a two-year contract with newly promoted HV71, on May 23, 2022.

On September 16, 2024, Ortio signed with HC Ässät Pori of the Finnish Liiga short-term through the end of November as an emergency replacement for the team's injured starting goaltender Niklas Rubin. On November 14, his contract with the club was continued until the end of December.

== Personal life ==
Ortio's father, Kai Ortio, is a former professional ice hockey defenceman who played two seasons in the Liiga and currently serves as head coach to TPS Naiset of the Naisten Liiga.

== Career statistics ==
=== Regular season and playoffs ===
			Regular season									Playoffs
Season	Team	League	GP	W	L	T/OT	MIN	GA	SO	GAA	SV%	GP	W	L	MIN	GA	SO	GAA	SV%
2009–10	TPS	SM-l	3	1	0	0	108	8	0	4.45	.837	—	—	—	—	—	—	—	—
2010–11	TPS	SM-l	15	2	7	3	729	38	1	3.13	—	—	—	—	—	—	—	—	—
2010–11	Abbotsford Heat	AHL	1	0	1	0	60	6	0	6.03	.800	—	—	—	—	—	—	—	—
2011–12	TPS	SM-l	14	3	6	3	753	33	2	2.63	.909	—	—	—	—	—	—	—	—
2011–12	Abbotsford Heat	AHL	9	1	4	0	387	19	0	2.94	.890	—	—	—	—	—	—	—	—
2012–13	HIFK Helsinki	SM-l	54	23	20	9	3120	126	4	2.42	—	8	3	5	481	20	0	2.49	—
2013–14	Alaska Aces	ECHL	4	3	1	0	238	4	2	1.01	.944	—	—	—	—	—	—	—	—
2013–14	Abbotsford Heat	AHL	37	27	8	0	2133	83	2	2.33	.926	4	1	3	250	12	0	2.88	.915
2013–14	Calgary Flames	NHL	9	4	4	0	501	21	0	2.51	.891	—	—	—	—	—	—	—	—
2014–15	Adirondack Flames	AHL	37	21	13	1	2095	94	4	2.69	.912	—	—	—	—	—	—	—	—
2014–15	Calgary Flames	NHL	6	4	2	0	333	14	1	2.52	.908	—	—	—	—	—	—	—	—
2015–16	Calgary Flames	NHL	22	7	9	5	1187	55	1	2.76	.902	—	—	—	—	—	—	—	—
2015–16	Stockton Heat	AHL	20	9	9	0	1055	59	0	3.36	.893	—	—	—	—	—	—	—	—
2016–17	Skellefteå AIK	SHL	42	26	15	0	2459	90	5	2.20	.918	7	3	4	368	13	1	2.12	.933
2017–18	Skellefteå AIK	SHL	31	17	14	0	1847	74	2	2.40	.911	16	8	7	911	38	1	2.50	.921
2018–19	HC Vityaz	KHL	52	24	22	4	3011	127	2	2.53	.922	3	0	2	149	9	0	3.61	.901
2019–20	ZSC Lions	NL	21	10	6	2	1237	49	1	2.38	.917	—	—	—	—	—	—	—	—
2020–21	Barys Nur-Sultan	KHL	32	12	16	2	1856	79	2	2.55	.914	6	2	3	279	15	0	3.23	.883
2021–22	Barys Nur-Sultan	KHL	39	15	18	5	2237	102	4	2.74	.907	4	1	2	179	14	0	4.69	.870
2022–23	HV71	SHL	41	18	22	0	2380	107	1	2.70	.905	—	—	—	—	—	—	—	—
2023–24	HV71	SHL	39	13	26	0	2286	126	1	3.31	.873	—	—	—	—	—	—	—	—
Liiga totals			86	29	33	15	4,710	205	7	2.61	—	8	3	5	481	20	0	2.49	—
NHL totals			37	15	15	5	2,031	90	2	2.66	.901	—	—	—	—	—	—	—	—
KHL totals			123	51	56	11	7,105	308	8	2.60	.916	13	3	7	608	38	0	3.75	.884

=== International ===
Year	Team	Comp	Result	GP	W	L	T/OT	MIN	GA	SO	GAA	SV%
2009	Finland	U18	3rd place, bronze medalist(s)	5	3	2	0	309	15	1	2.91	—
2010	Finland	WJC	5th	6	3	3	0	318	16	0	3.02	—
2011	Finland	WJC	6th	6	2	0	3	354	11	1	1.86	.931
2013	Finland	WC	4th	3	3	0	0	182	6	0	1.98	.897
Senior totals				3	3	0	0	182	6	0	1.98	.897

== Awards and honours ==
Award	Year
AHL
All-Rookie Team	2014
All-Star Game	2015
