= 1992–93 I-Divisioona season =

19th season of Finnish ice hockey tier

The 1992–93 I-Divisioona season was the 19th season of the I-Divisioona, the second level of Finnish ice hockey. 12 teams participated in the league, and JoKP Joensuu won the championship. KooKoo, TuTo Hockey, and JoKP Joensuu qualified for the SM-liiga promotion/relegation round.

== Regular season ==
Pl.	Club	GP	W	T	L	GF	GA	Diff	Pts
1.	JoKP Joensuu	44				244	146	+98	62
2.	TuTo	44				200	152	+48	58
3.	KooKoo Kouvola	44				220	140	+80	57
4.	Kärpät Oulu	44				220	140	+80	55
5.	JHT	44				197	190	+7	52
6.	Kiekko-67	44				166	144	+22	50
7.	SaiPa	44				181	190	−9	44
8.	Karhu-Kissat	44				160	204	−44	36
9.	FPS	44				198	215	−17	35
10.	Vantaa HT	44				142	205	−63	29
11.	Centers Pietarsaari	44							
12.	HJK Helsinki	Withdrew after 30 games							
