= 1986–87 I-Divisioona season =

The 1986–87 I-Divisioona season was the 13th season of the I-Divisioona, the second level of Finnish ice hockey. 12 teams participated in the league, and KooKoo won the championship. KooKoo, TuTo Hockey, HPK Hämeenlinna, and JoKP Joensuu qualified for the promotion/relegation round of the SM-liiga.

== Regular season ==
	Club	GP	W	T	L	GF–GA	Pts
1.	KooKoo Kouvola	44	36	2	6	302:137	74
2.	TuTo Hockey	44	28	1	15	234:120	57
3.	HPK Hämeenlinna	44	27	1	16	223:165	55
4.	JoKP Joensuu	44	25	2	17	231:190	52
5.	SaiPa Lappeenranta	44	23	5	16	205:201	51
6.	Vaasan Sport	44	23	1	20	200:203	47
7.	Ketterä Imatra	44	19	1	24	195:237	39
8.	Kiekko-Reipas Lahti	44	18	3	23	193:241	39
9.	SaPKo Savonlinna	44	17	2	25	221:215	36
10.	Karhu-Kissat	44	16	4	24	189:236	36
11.	FoPS Forssa	44	15	1	28	217:292	31
12.	Peliitat Heinola	44	4	3	37	131:306	11
