= 1993–94 I-Divisioona season =

The 1993–94 I-Divisioona season was the 20th season of the I-Divisioona, the second level of Finnish ice hockey. 12 teams participated in the league, and TuTo Hockey won the championship. TuTo Hockey, SaiPa Lappeenranta, and JoKP Joensuu qualified for the promotion/relegation round of the SM-liiga.

== Regular season ==
	Club	GP	W	T	L	GF–GA	Pts
1.	TuTo Hockey	28	17	6	5	132:99	40
2.	SaiPa Lappeenranta	28	15	7	6	124:94	37
3.	JoKP Joensuu	28	16	4	8	142:106	36
4.	Kärpät Oulu	28	16	4	8	138:98	36
5.	SaPKo Savonlinna	28	16	3	9	113:98	35
6.	FoPS Forssa	28	13	2	13	121:126	28
7.	Hermes Kokkola	28	12	2	14	108:114	26
8.	Kiekko-67 Turku	28	12	2	14	91:87	26
9.	KooKoo Kouvola	28	11	2	15	112:135	24
10.	Junkkarit Kalajoki	28	8	6	14	92:109	22
11.	Karhu-Kissat	28	9	2	17	102:124	20
12.	Ketterä Imatra	28	3	0	25	91:176	6
