= 1985–86 I-Divisioona season =

The 1985–86 I-Divisioona season was the 12th season of the I-Divisioona, the second level of Finnish ice hockey. 12 teams participated in the league, and KalPa Kuopio won the championship. KalPa Kuopio, TuToHockey, KooKoo, and HPK Hämeenlinna qualified for the promotion/relegation round of the SM-liiga.

== Regular season ==
	Club	GP	W	T	L	GF–GA	Pts
1.	KalPa Kuopio	44	37	1	6	276:136	75
2.	TuTo Hockey	44	31	5	8	221:147	67
3.	KooKoo Kouvola	44	30	3	11	231:153	63
4.	HPK Hämeenlinna	44	26	1	17	229:193	53
5.	Karhu-Kissat	44	22	2	20	214:199	46
6.	Peliitat Heinola	44	21	1	22	246:227	43
7.	JoKP Joensuu	44	19	3	22	169:171	41
8.	FoPS Forssa	44	18	1	25	228:256	37
9.	Kiekko-Reipas Lahti	44	13	5	26	175:220	31
10.	Ketterä Imatra	44	14	1	29	185:252	29
11.	SaPKo Savonlinna	44	12	3	29	173:245	27
12.	TJV Vantaa	44	7	2	35	155:299	16
