= 1984–85 I-Divisioona season =

The 1984–85 I-Divisioona season was the 11th season of the I-Divisioona, the second level of Finnish ice hockey. 12 teams participated in the league, and JYP Jyväskylä won the championship. JYP Jyväskylä, KalPa Kuopio, KooKoo, and TuTo Hockey qualified for the promotion/relegation round of the SM-liiga.

== Regular season ==
	Club	GP	W	T	L	GF–GA	Pts
1.	JYP Jyväskylä	44	34	4	6	297:128	72
2.	KalPa Kuopio	44	28	4	12	240:166	60
3.	KooKoo Kouvola	44	25	6	13	194:162	56
4.	TuTo Hockey	44	23	7	14	178:146	53
5.	JoKP Joensuu	44	21	10	13	246:154	52
6.	HPK Hämeenlinna	44	22	8	14	223:176	52
7.	Karhu-Kissat	44	14	7	22	157:201	36
8.	Peliitat Heinola	44	14	6	23	183:238	35
9.	FoPS Forssa	44	14	4	24	219:277	34
10.	Ketterä Imatra	44	12	3	26	181:265	32
11.	SaPKo Savonlinna	44	9	1	29	172:283	27
12.	Vaasan Sport	44	7	2	34	156:250	19
