= 1990–91 I-Divisioona season =

The 1990–91 I-Divisioona season was the 17th season of the I-Divisioona, the second level of Finnish ice hockey. 12 teams participated in the league, and JoKP Joensuu won the championship and was promoted to the SM-liiga. Kärpät Oulu finished second and was able to participate in the promotion/relegation round of the SM-liiga.

== Regular season ==
Pl.	Team	GP	W	T	L	GF	GA	Diff	Pts
1.	JoKP Joensuu	44				282	111	171	75
2.	Kärpät Oulu	44				230	137	93	61
3.	Vantaa HT	44				188	173	15	53
4.	Karhu-Kissat	44				204	156	48	49
5.	Kiekko-Espoo	44				186	166	20	49
6.	Kiekko-67	44				144	146	−2	48
7.	FPS	44				199	211	−12	38
8.	TuTo	44				200	224	−24	38
9.	GrIFK	44	18	2	24	176	217	−41	38
10.	KooKoo Kouvola	44				191	210	−19	27
11.	Sport	44	12	4	28	149	249	−100	28
12.	Ketterä	44	5			147	296	−149	
