= I-Divisioona =

2nd level ice hockey league in Finland (1974-2000)

- Formerly: Suomensarja (1935–1974); Finland-liiga (1992–1994); Fazer liiga (1994–1996)
- Sport: Ice hockey
- Founded: 1974
- Folded: 2000
- Replaced by: Mestis
- No. of teams: 8–16
- Country: Finland
- Last champion: Kärpät
- Most titles: SaiPa, Kärpät (5)
- Level on pyramid: Level 2
- Promotion to: Liiga
- Relegation to: II-Divisioona

I-Divisioona was the second tier of ice hockey in Finland from 1974 to 2000. It replaced the previous league Suomensarja that ran from 1936 to 1974.

I-Divisioona was known as the Finland-liiga (1992–1994) and the Fazer liiga (1994–1996) due to naming rights deals.

In 2000, I-Divisioona was replaced by Mestis.

== Participating teams ==
| Season | Teams | Promoted | Relegated |
|---|---|---|---|
| 1974–75 | Sport, FoPS, HPK, PiTa, Kärpät, KooKoo, SaPKo, JYP | Sport, FoPS | - |
| 1975–76 | K-reipas, Kärpät, SaiPa, HPK, KooKoo, Jukurit, SaPKo, PiTa, JYP, JoKP | K-reipas | JoKP |
| 1976–77 | Kärpät, Sport, SaiPa, HPK, Jäähonka, JYP, KooKoo, SaPKo, Jukurit, PiTa | Kärpät | - |
| 1977–78 | SaiPa, FoPS, HPK, Sport, Jukurit, JYP, Jäähonka, SaPKo, KooKoo, HJK | - | HJK |
| 1978–79 | SaiPa, FoPS, JYP, SaPKo, K-67, Jäähonka, KooKoo, HPK, Sport, Jukurit | - | - |
| 1979–80 | HPK, SaiPa, SaPKo, Sport, JYP, FoPS, Jäähonka, KooKoo, Jukurit, K-67 | SaiPa | Jukurit, K-67 |
| 1980–81 | HPK, KooVee, JYP, SaPKo, Sport, KooKoo, FoPS, Jäähonka, Valtit, JoKP | - | - |
| 1981–82 | HPK, FoPS, Sport, JYP, JoKP; SaPKo, KooVee, Valtit, KooKoo, Jäähonka | - | Jäähonka, Valtit |
| 1982–83 | HPK, JoKP, KooKoo, JYP, KooVee, KalPa, Sport, FoPS, Ketterä, SaPKo | HPK | SaPKo |
| 1983–84 | Lukko, JYP, JoKP, TuTo, KalPa, KooKoo, Ketterä, Peliitat, Sport, FoPS | Lukko | - |
| 1984–85 | JYP, KalPa, KooKoo, TuTo, JoKP, HPK, Karhu-Kissat, Peliitat, FoPS, Ketterä, SaPKo, Sport | JYP | Sport |
| 1985–86 | KalPa, TuTo, KooKoo, HPK, K-Kissat, Peliitat, JoKP, FoPS, K-Reipas, Ketterä, SaPKo, TJV | KalPa | TJV |
| 1986–87 | KooKoo, TuTo, HPK, JoKP, SaiPa, Sport, Ketterä, K-Reipas, SaPKo, K-Kissat, FoPS, Peliitat | KooKoo | Peliitat |
| 1987–88 | HPK, SaiPa, K-reipas, JoKP, Sport, TuTo, Jokerit, SaPKo, Ketterä, FoPS, K-Kissat, VaKi | HPK, SaiPa | VaKi |
| 1988–89 | JoKP, Jokerit, K-Espoo, K-Reipas, FoPS, K-Kissat, Ketterä, KooVee, Sport, TuTo, Peliitat, SaPKo | JoKP, Jokerit | Peliitat, SaPKo |
| 1989–90 | Ässät, H-Reipas, Kärpät, FoPS, K-Kissat, Sport, K-67, TuTo, K-Espoo, Ketterä, KooVee, H-Salo | Ässät, H-reipas | KooVee, H-Salo |
| 1990–91 | JoKP, Kärpät, VHT, K-Kissat, K-Espoo, K-67, FoPS, TuTo, GrIFK, KooKoo, Sport, Ketterä | JoKP | Ketterä |
| 1991–92 | K-Espoo, Kärpät, KooKoo, FoPS, K-67, SaiPa, TuTo, Centers, VHT, HJK, K-Kissat, Sport | K-Espoo | Sport |
| 1992–93 | JoKP, TuTo, KooKoo, Kärpät, Junkkarit, K-67, SaiPa, K-Kissat, FoPS, VHT, Centers, HJK | - | VHT, Centers, HJK |
| 1993–94 | TuTo, JoKP, SaiPa, SaPKo, Kärpät, Hermes, KooKoo, K-67, FoPS, Junkkarit, Karhu-Kissat, Ketterä | TuTo | Kärpät, JoKP |
| 1994–95 | SaiPa, KooKoo, K-67, Hermes, SaPKo, Haukat, FoPS, Reipas, KooVee, Junkkarit, Karhu-Kissat, Ketterä | - | Karhu-Kissat |
| 1995–96 | Hermes, SaiPa, K-67, FPS, Kiekko-Karhut, Reipas, SaPKo, Kärpät, PiTa, Haukat, Titaanit, KooKoo, KooVee, Ketterä, Diskos, Junkkarit | SaiPa | Diskos, Junkkarit |
| 1996–97 | Kärpät, Kiekko-Karhut, FPS, Haukat, Pelicans, Hermes, TuTo, Ahmat, SaPKo, UJK, K-67, Titaanit, PiTa, KooVee, Ketterä, KooKoo | - | K-67, Titaanit, PiTa, KooVee, Ketterä, KooKoo |
| 1997–98 | Kärpät, Hermes, Pelicans, FPS, TuTo, Diskos, SaPKo, Sport, Haukat, Kiekko-Karhut, Ahmat, UJK | - | - |
| 1998–99 | Kärpät, Pelicans, Sport, Diskos, Hermes, TuTo, FPS, Jokipojat, SaPKo, Haukat, UJK, Ahmat | Pelicans | - |
| 1999–2000 | Kärpät, Sport, Diskos, TuTo, Jokipojat, KooKoo, Hermes, FPS, UJK, KJT, Ahmat, SaPKo | Kärpät | SaPKo, Ahmat |
