= 1988–89 SM-liiga season =

Finnish ice hockey season

The 1988–89 SM-liiga season was the 14th season of the SM-liiga, the top level of ice hockey in Finland. 12 teams participated in the league, and TPS Turku won the championship.

== Standings ==
	Club	GP	W	T	L	GF	GA	Pts
1.	TPS Turku	44	29	5	10	209	120	63
2.	Ilves Tampere	44	27	4	13	232	171	58
3.	JyP HT Jyväskylä	44	24	5	15	202	167	53
4.	Tappara Tampere	44	23	3	18	226	163	49
5.	KalPa Kuopio	44	24	1	19	188	195	49
6.	HIFK Helsinki	44	22	4	18	163	159	48
7	Lukko Rauma	44	22	1	21	187	185	45
8.	HPK Hämeenlinna	44	17	3	24	196	197	37
9.	KooKoo Kouvola	44	16	4	23	146	194	36
10.	SaiPa Lappeenranta	44	15	1	28	171	247	31
11.	Kärpät Oulu	44	14	2	28	152	212	30
12.	Ässät Pori	44	13	3	28	165	227	29

Source: Elite Prospects

== Playoffs ==
=== Quarterfinals ===
- JyP HT - HIFK 2:0 (4:3, 3:2)
- Tappara - KalPa 2:0 (6:0, 7:6)

=== Semifinals ===
- TPS - Tappara 3:2 (1:3, 4:5, 3:1, 5:2, 7:3)
- Ilves - JyP HT 1:3 (4:5 P, 2:4, 7:4, 1:3)

=== 3rd place ===
- Ilves - Tappara 10:3

=== Final ===
- TPS - JyP HT 4:1 (5:0, 2:4, 3:1, 7:1, 4:1)

== Relegation ==
- JoKP Joensuu - Ässät Pori 3:2 (5:4 OT, 4:5, 5:1, 3:5, 5:3)
- Kärpät Oulu - Jokerit Helsinki 2:3 (7:3, 3:7, 8:4, 2:3, 2:5)
