= 1989–90 SM-liiga season =

Finnish ice hockey season

The 1989–90 SM-liiga season was the 15th season of the SM-liiga, the top level of ice hockey in Finland. 12 teams participated in the league, and TPS Turku won the championship.

== Standings ==
	Club	GP	W	T	L	GF	GA	Pts
1.	TPS Turku	44	31	3	10	175	100	65
2.	Ilves Tampere	44	25	7	12	208	141	57
3.	HIFK Helsinki	44	25	4	15	176	158	54
4.	JyP HT Jyväskylä	44	24	3	17	187	146	51
5.	Tappara Tampere	44	23	5	16	189	164	51
6.	KalPa Kuopio	44	24	3	17	205	202	51
7	HPK Hämeenlinna	44	19	5	20	192	182	43
8.	SaiPa Lappeenranta	44	20	1	23	172	205	41
9.	Lukko Rauma	44	17	4	23	166	170	38
10.	Jokerit Helsinki	44	15	3	26	165	183	33
11.	KooKoo Kouvola	44	11	4	29	146	219	26
12.	JoKP Joensuu	44	7	4	33	109	220	18

Source: Elite Prospects

== Playoffs ==
=== Quarterfinals ===
- JyP HT - Tappara 1:2 (8:1, 3:4, 1:5)
- HIFK - KalPa 0:2 (3:4, 0:4)

=== Semifinals ===
- TPS - KalPa 3:0 (3:1, 6:5 P, 5:1)
- Ilves - Tappara 3:0 (5:4, 5:4, 6:3)

=== 3rd place ===
- Tappara - KalPa 5:3

=== Final ===
- TPS - Ilves 4:2 (1:4, 4:1, 2:3, 7:0, 5:3, 6:3)

== Relegation ==
- KooKoo - Hockey-Reipas 1:3 (4:1, 2:8, 6:7, 1:6)
- Ässät Pori - JoKP 3:0 (3:2, 5:4, 9:4)
