= Koovee =

Finnish multi-sport club

Koovee is a Finnish sport club based in Tampere. It was founded at 1929 and soon expanded to many different kinds of sports. The full name of the club used to be Tampereen Kilpa-Veljet Ry (TK-V), but it was first changed to KOO-VEE ry and in 2010 to the form Koovee Ry. Koovee is one of the biggest sport clubs in Finland.

== Sections of Koovee ==
- Koovee Football
- Koovee Ice hockey
- Koovee Wrestling
- Koovee Finnish Baseball
- Koovee Petanque
- Koovee Cycling
- Koovee Floorball
  - Women's team play in highest tier of Finnish floorball, Naisten Salibandyliiga
- Koovee Orienteering
- Koovee Figure skating
- Koovee Swimming
- Koovee Rollers

== Achievements ==
- Koovee Ice-hockey: Finnish championship in 1968; SM silver in 1959, 1962 and 1964, bronze medal 1960, 1961 and 1977, the Finnish Cup championship in 1968. Mestis 2006–2007 season
- Koovee Orienteering: Jukola relay victory in 1966, 2016 and 2018. In 2002 the club won the SM-point competition. The club representatives have also done well in European championship, Nordic countries championship and in the World Championship. Well-known competitors from Finland that represent or have represented the club include Liisa Anttila, Paula Haapakoski, Marika Hara, Anja Meldo and Merja Rantanen. Daniel Hubmann anchored the Koovee team at Jukola in 2016 and 2018.
- Koovee Wrestling: The club representative Pertti Ukkola has won Olympic medal, gold in Montreal in 1976, and Marko Asell silver in Atlanta 1996.
- Koovee Rollers: Finnish inline hockey championship in 2011.

== See also ==
- The web page of Koovee
