= SaPKo =

Ice hockey team from Savonlinna, Finland

- City: Savonlinna, Finland
- League: Suomi-sarja
- Founded: 1929
- Home arena: Talvisalo ice rink
- Colours
- General manager: Jan-Erik Wasenius
- Head coach: Juho Nykäne
- Captain: Juuso Forsström
- Affiliate: Jukurit (Liiga)
- Website: www.sapko.fi

Savonlinnan Pallokerho (SaPKo) is an ice hockey team from Savonlinna, Finland, they currently play in the Suomi-sarja. It plays its home matches at the Talvisalo ice rink.

== History ==
The sports club Savonlinnan Pallokerho was founded in 1929. First it consisted football and bandy sections, but since the 1960s ice hockey has been the main sport.

In 1960s SaPKo played four seasons in the highest tier of Finnish ice hockey SM-sarja but was relegated to Suomi-sarja in 1971. In 1974 the new First Division was formed and SaPKo was one of the teams participating. SaPKo soon established itself as the team of I-divisioona expect few visits to Second Division. In 1968 SaPKo worked its way to the final of Finnish Cup, but lost the final to KooVee 10–2.

Later bigger success came in the season 1994/1995 when SaPKo had very good regular season with players like Team Canada captain Brian Tutt and was close to promotion to the SM-liiga. It played tight promotion playoffs against Ilves but failed to promote. After the success started downtrend which culminated to relegation to Suomi-sarja. At the end of the 2005/2006 season SaPKo finally gained promotion back to the second tier, Mestis.

In 2022, the club filed for bankruptcy after acquiring a debt of 227,000 euros. However, fifteen entrepreneurs helped fund and re-establish the club for the 2023-24 season and they were approved to play in the Suomi-sarja, where they placed fourth that season.

== Honours ==
=== Mestis ===
- (gold) (1): 2017
- (bronze) (1): 2018

=== Suomi-sarja ===
- (gold) (1): 2003
- (silver) (1): 2006

=== Finnish cup ===
- (silver) (3): 1967, 1968, 2017

== Notable players ==
- Arto Heiskanen
- Jarkko Immonen
- Gennadi Kurdin
- Niko Laakkonen
- Jukka-Pekka Laamanen
- Ville Leino
- Steve MacDonald
- Randy Maxwell
- Jarmo Myllys
- Tuukka Rask
- Seppo Repo
- Reino Soijärvi
- Antti Tirkkonen
- Pekka Tirkkonen
- Paavo Tirkkonen
- Tommi Turunen
- Seppo Aksila
- Brian Tutt
- Viktor Tyumenev
- Jan-Mikael Järvinen

== Retired numbers ==
- 2 Paavo Tirkkonen
- 3 Jyrki Turunen
- 5 Ahti Ruohoaho
- 10 Raimo Turkulainen
