= TUTO Hockey =

- City: Turku, Finland
- League: Mestis
- Founded: 1929 Turun Toverit; 1988 TuTo Hockey; 2011 TUTO Hockey
- Home arena: Kupittaan jäähalli (capacity 2,875)
- Colours
- Owner: TUTO Hockey Oy
- General manager: Roope Paltta
- Head coach: Miika Elomo
- Captain: Jere Karlsson
- Farm clubs: HC Indians; VG-62
- Website: https://www.tutohockey.fi/

TUTO Hockey is a Finnish ice hockey team based at the Kupittaan jäähalli (capacity 2,875, inauguration in November 2006). Established in 1929, TUTO plays in Turku, Finland, and is one of two clubs in that city (the other being TPS of Liiga). They play in the second highest ice hockey league in Finland, Mestis, having been relegated out of SM-liiga in 1996 (four years before SM-liiga closed its promotion/relegation system). TUTO has applied for a SM-liiga license for the 2024–25 season.

== Honours ==
=== SM-sarja ===
- (bronze) SM-sarja (2): 1968, 1970

=== Finnish cup ===
- (gold) Finnish Cup (ice hockey) (1): 2017

=== Mestis ===
- (gold) Mestis (1): 2008
- (silver) Mestis (2): 2001, 2018
- (bronze) Mestis (5): 2005, 2006, 2013, 2014, 2019
