= FPS (ice hockey) =

- City: Forssa, Finland
- League: Suomi-sarja
- Founded: 1931
- Home arena: Forssa Ice Hall (capacity: 3,000)
- Colours
- Head coach: (Finland) Nils Hagman
- Captain: (Finland) Samuli Virtanen
- Website: http://www.forssanpalloseura.fi

Forssan Palloseura is a Finnish ice hockey team based in the town of Forssa. As of the 2024–25 season, FPS plays in the Finnish third tier, Suomi-sarja. FPS play their home games in the Forssa Ice Hall that has a capacity of 3,000. Forssan Palloseura played two seasons in the Finnish Elite League from 1975 to 1977.

== Home arena ==
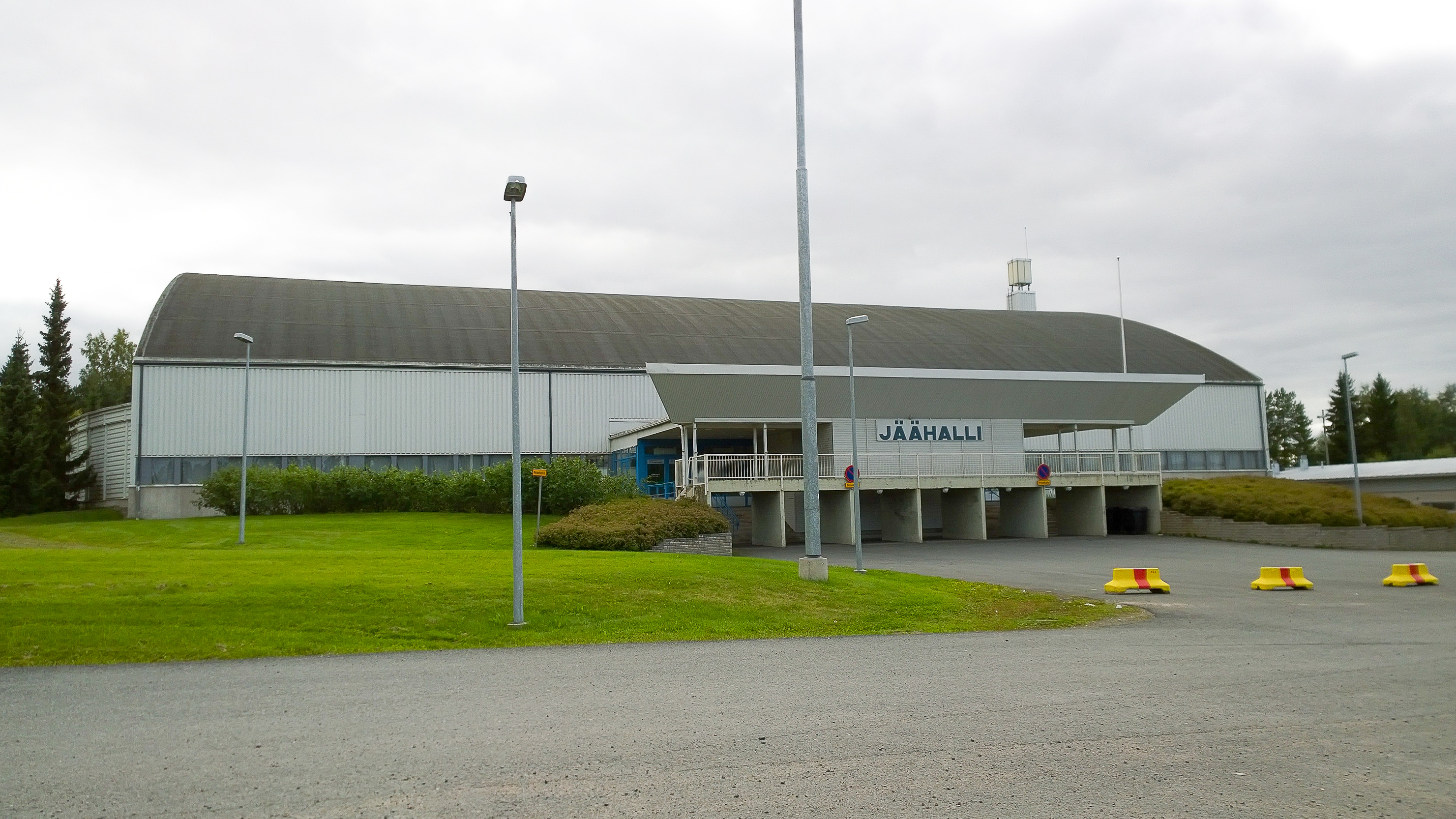
The Forssa Ice Hall

Forssan Palloseura's home arena is the 1988 built Forssa Ice Hall that has a capacity of 3,000 spectators.
