= List of 1988 Winter Olympics medal winners =

== Alpine skiing ==
=== Men's events ===
Event	Gold	Silver	Bronze
Downhill	Pirmin Zurbriggen; Switzerland	Peter Müller; Switzerland	Franck Piccard; France
Super-G	Franck Piccard; France	Helmut Mayer; Austria	Lars-Börje Eriksson; Sweden
Giant slalom	Alberto Tomba; Italy	Hubert Strolz; Austria	Pirmin Zurbriggen; Switzerland
Slalom	Alberto Tomba; Italy	Frank Wörndl; West Germany	Paul Frommelt; Liechtenstein
Combined	Hubert Strolz; Austria	Bernhard Gstrein; Austria	Paul Accola; Switzerland

=== Women's events ===
Event	Gold	Silver	Bronze
Downhill	Marina Kiehl; West Germany	Brigitte Oertli; Switzerland	Karen Percy; Canada
Super-G	Sigrid Wolf; Austria	Michela Figini; Switzerland	Karen Percy; Canada
Giant slalom	Vreni Schneider; Switzerland	Christa Kinshofer; West Germany	Maria Walliser; Switzerland
Slalom	Vreni Schneider; Switzerland	Mateja Svet; Yugoslavia	Christa Kinshofer; West Germany
Combined	Anita Wachter; Austria	Brigitte Oertli; Switzerland	Maria Walliser; Switzerland

== Biathlon ==
Event	Gold	Silver	Bronze
Men's Individual	Frank-Peter Roetsch; East Germany	Valeriy Medvedtsev; Soviet Union	Johann Passler; Italy
Men's Sprint	Frank-Peter Roetsch; East Germany	Valeriy Medvedtsev; Soviet Union	Sergei Tchepikov; Soviet Union
Men's Relay	Soviet Union; Dmitry Vasilyev; Sergei Tchepikov; Aleksandr Popov; Valeriy Medvedtsev	West Germany; Ernst Reiter; Stefan Höck; Peter Angerer; Fritz Fischer	Italy; Werner Kiem; Gottlieb Taschler; Johann Passler; Andreas Zingerle

== Bobsleigh ==
Event	Gold	Silver	Bronze
Two-man	Soviet Union (URS-1); Jānis Ķipurs; Vladimir Kozlov	East Germany (GDR-1); Wolfgang Hoppe; Bogdan Musioł	East Germany (GDR-2); Bernhard Lehmann; Mario Hoyer
Four-man	Switzerland (SUI-1); Ekkehard Fasser; Kurt Meier; Marcel Fässler; Werner Stocker	East Germany (GDR-1); Wolfgang Hoppe; Dietmar Schauerhammer; Bogdan Musioł; Ingo Voge	Soviet Union (URS-2); Jānis Ķipurs; Guntis Osis; Juris Tone; Vladimir Kozlov

== Cross-country skiing ==
=== Men's events ===
Event	Gold	Silver	Bronze
15 kilometre classical	Mikhail Devyatyarov; Soviet Union	Pål Gunnar Mikkelsplass; Norway	Vladimir Smirnov; Soviet Union
30 kilometre classical	Alexey Prokurorov; Soviet Union	Vladimir Smirnov; Soviet Union	Vegard Ulvang; Norway
50 kilometre freestyle	Gunde Svan; Sweden	Maurilio De Zolt; Italy	Andi Grünenfelder; Switzerland
4 x 10 km relay	Sweden; Jan Ottosson; Thomas Wassberg; Gunde Svan; Torgny Mogren	Soviet Union; Vladimir Smirnov; Vladimir Sakhnov; Mikhail Devyatyarov; Alexey Prokurorov	Czechoslovakia; Radim Nyč; Václav Korunka; Pavel Benc; Ladislav Švanda

=== Women's events ===
Event	Gold	Silver	Bronze
5 kilometre classical	Marjo Matikainen; Finland	Tamara Tikhonova; Soviet Union	Vida Vencienė; Soviet Union
10 kilometre classical	Vida Vencienė; Soviet Union	Raisa Smetanina; Soviet Union	Marjo Matikainen; Finland
20 kilometre freestyle	Tamara Tikhonova; Soviet Union	Anfisa Reztsova; Soviet Union	Raisa Smetanina; Soviet Union
4 x 5 km relay	Soviet Union; Svetlana Nageykina; Nina Gavrilyuk; Tamara Tikhonova; Anfisa Reztsova	Norway; Trude Dybendahl; Marit Wold; Anne Jahren; Marianne Dahlmo	Finland; Pirkko Määttä; Marja-Liisa Kirvesniemi; Marjo Matikainen; Jaana Savolainen

== Figure skating ==
Event	Gold	Silver	Bronze
Men's singles	Brian Boitano; United States	Brian Orser; Canada	Viktor Petrenko; Soviet Union
Ladies' singles	Katarina Witt; East Germany	Elizabeth Manley; Canada	Debi Thomas; United States
Pairs	Soviet Union; Ekaterina Gordeeva; Sergei Grinkov	Soviet Union; Elena Valova; Oleg Vasiliev	United States; Jill Watson; Peter Oppegard
Ice dancing	Soviet Union; Natalia Bestemianova; Andrei Bukin	Soviet Union; Marina Klimova; Sergei Ponomarenko	Canada; Tracy Wilson; Robert McCall

== Ice hockey ==
Event	Gold	Silver	Bronze
Men's team	Soviet Union; Ilya Byakin; Vyacheslav Bykov; Viacheslav Fetisov; Alexei Gusarov; Sergei Yashin; Valeri Kamensky; Alexei Kasatonov; Andrei Khomutov; Vladimir Krutov; Igor Larionov; Aleksandr Kozhevnikov; Igor Kravchuk; Andrei Lomakin; Sergei Makarov; Alexander Mogilny; Sergei Mylnikov; Vitali Samoilov; Anatoly Semenov; Sergei Starikov; Igor Stelnov; Sergei Svetlov; Aleksandr Chernykh	Finland; Jarmo Myllys; Jukka Tammi; Timo Blomqvist; Kari Eloranta; Jyrki Lumme; Teppo Numminen; Arto Ruotanen; Reijo Ruotsalainen; Simo Saarinen; Jukka Virtanen; Raimo Helminen; Iiro Järvi; Esa Keskinen; Erkki Laine; Kari Laitinen; Erkki Lehtonen; Reijo Mikkolainen; Janne Ojanen; Kai Suikkanen; Timo Susi; Jari Torkki; Pekka Tuomisto	Sweden; Peter Andersson; Anders Eldebrink; Lars Ivarsson; Lars Karlsson; Mats Kihlström; Tommy Samuelsson; Mikael Andersson; Bo Berglund; Jonas Bergqvist; Peter Eriksson; Michael Hjälm; Mikael Johansson; Lars Molin; Lars-Gunnar Pettersson; Thomas Rundqvist; Ulf Sandström; Håkan Södergren; Jens Öhling; Thomas Eriksson; Thom Eklund; Peter Åslin; Peter Lindmark

== Luge ==
Event	Gold	Silver	Bronze
Men's singles	Jens Müller; East Germany	Georg Hackl; West Germany	Yury Kharchenko; Soviet Union
Women's singles	Steffi Walter-Martin; East Germany	Ute Oberhoffner-Weiß; East Germany	Cerstin Schmidt; East Germany
Doubles	East Germany; Jörg Hoffmann; Jochen Pietzsch	East Germany; Stefan Krauße; Jan Behrendt	West Germany; Thomas Schwab; Wolfgang Staudinger

== Nordic combined ==
Event	Gold	Silver	Bronze
Individual	Hippolyt Kempf; Switzerland	Klaus Sulzenbacher; Austria	Allar Levandi; Soviet Union
Team	West Germany; Hans-Peter Pohl; Hubert Schwarz; Thomas Müller	Switzerland; Andreas Schaad; Hippolyt Kempf; Fredy Glanzmann	Austria; Günther Csar; Hansjörg Aschenwald; Klaus Sulzenbacher

== Ski jumping ==
Event	Gold	Silver	Bronze
Normal hill individual	Matti Nykänen; Finland	Pavel Ploc; Czechoslovakia	Jiří Malec; Czechoslovakia
Large hill individual	Matti Nykänen; Finland	Erik Johnsen; Norway	Matjaž Debelak; Yugoslavia
Large hill team	Finland; Ari-Pekka Nikkola; Matti Nykänen; Tuomo Ylipulli; Jari Puikkonen	Yugoslavia; Primož Ulaga; Matjaž Zupan; Matjaž Debelak; Miran Tepeš	Norway; Ole Christian Eidhammer; Jon Inge Kjørum; Ole Gunnar Fidjestøl; Erik Johnsen

== Speed skating ==
=== Men's events ===
Event	Gold	Silver	Bronze
500 metres	Uwe-Jens Mey; East Germany	Jan Ykema; Netherlands	Akira Kuroiwa; Japan
1000 metres	Nikolay Gulyayev; Soviet Union	Uwe-Jens Mey; East Germany	Igor Zhelezovski; Soviet Union
1500 metres	André Hoffmann; East Germany	Eric Flaim; United States	Michael Hadschieff; Austria
5000 metres	Tomas Gustafson; Sweden	Leo Visser; Netherlands	Gerard Kemkers; Netherlands
10,000 metres	Tomas Gustafson; Sweden	Michael Hadschieff; Austria	Leo Visser; Netherlands

=== Women's events ===
Event	Gold	Silver	Bronze
500 metres	Bonnie Blair; United States	Christa Rothenburger; East Germany	Karin Kania; East Germany
1000 metres	Christa Rothenburger; East Germany	Karin Kania; East Germany	Bonnie Blair; United States
1500 metres	Yvonne van Gennip; Netherlands	Karin Kania; East Germany	Andrea Ehrig; East Germany
3000 metres	Yvonne van Gennip; Netherlands	Andrea Ehrig; East Germany	Gabi Zange; East Germany
5000 metres	Yvonne van Gennip; Netherlands	Andrea Ehrig; East Germany	Gabi Zange; East Germany

== See also ==
- 1988 Winter Olympics medal table
