= Finland at the 1988 Winter Olympics =

- IOC code: FIN
- NOC: Finnish Olympic Committee
- Website: sport.fi/olympiakomitea (in Finnish and Swedish)

in Calgary
- Competitors: 53 (46 men, 7 women) in 7 sports
- Flag bearer: Pertti Niittylä (speed skating)
- Medals Ranked 4th: Gold 4 Silver 1 Bronze 2 Total 7

Winter Olympics appearances (overview)
- 1924; 1928; 1932; 1936; 1948; 1952; 1956; 1960; 1964; 1968; 1972; 1976; 1980; 1984; 1988; 1992; 1994; 1998; 2002; 2006; 2010; 2014; 2018; 2022; 2026

Finland competed at the 1988 Winter Olympics in Calgary, Alberta, Canada.

== Medalists ==
Medal	Name	Sport	Event	Date
Gold	Matti Nykänen	Ski jumping	Normal hill individual	14 February
Gold	Marjo Matikainen	Cross-country skiing	Women's 5 kilometre classical	17 February
Gold	Matti Nykänen	Ski jumping	Large hill individual	23 February
Gold	Ari-Pekka Nikkola; Matti Nykänen; Jari Puikkonen; Tuomo Ylipulli	Ski jumping	Large hill team	24 February
Silver	Finland men's national ice hockey team: Timo Blomqvist; Kari Eloranta; Raimo Helminen; Iiro Järvi; Esa Keskinen; Erkki Laine; Kari Laitinen; Jukka Virtanen; Erkki Lehtonen; Jyrki Lumme; Reijo Mikkolainen; Jarmo Myllys; Teppo Numminen; Janne Ojanen; Arto Ruotanen; Reijo Ruotsalainen; Simo Saarinen; Kai Suikkanen; Timo Susi; Jukka Tammi; Jari Torkki; Pekka Tuomisto	Ice hockey	Men's competition	28 February
Bronze	Marjo Matikainen	Cross-country skiing	Women's 10 kilometre classical	14 February
Bronze	Marja-Liisa Kirvesniemi; Marjo Matikainen; Pirkko Määttä; Jaana Savolainen	Cross-country skiing	Women's 4 × 5 kilometre relay	21 February

== Competitors ==
The following is the list of number of competitors in the Games.

Sport	Men	Women	Total
Alpine skiing	0	1	1
Biathlon	5	–	5
Cross-country skiing	7	6	13
Ice hockey	22	–	22
Nordic combined	4	–	4
Ski jumping	6	–	6
Speed skating	2	0	2
Total	46	7	53

== Alpine skiing ==
Women

Athlete	Event	Race 1	Race 2	Total	
Athlete	Event	Time	Time	Time	Rank
Nina Ehrnrooth	Giant Slalom	DNF	–	DNF	–
Nina Ehrnrooth	Slalom	DNF	–	DNF	–

== Biathlon ==
Men

Event	Athlete	Misses ^{1}	Time	Rank
10 km Sprint	Antero Lähde	3	27:59.9	42
10 km Sprint	Juha Tella	3	27:58.3	41
10 km Sprint	Harri Eloranta	3	27:15.2	25
10 km Sprint	Tapio Piipponen	1	26:02.2	7

Event	Athlete	Time	Misses	Adjusted time ^{2}	Rank
20 km	Arto Jääskeläinen	58:29.5	11	1'09:29.5	58
20 km	Harri Eloranta	58:10.6	7	1'05:10.6	50
20 km	Juha Tella	57:39.0	6	1'03:39.0	38
20 km	Tapio Piipponen	55:18.3	3	58:18.3	8

Men's 4 x 7.5 km relay

Athletes	Race		
Athletes	Misses ^{1}	Time	Rank
Juha Tella; Antero Lähde; Arto Jääskeläinen; Tapio Piipponen	5	1'30:54.4	12

^{1} A penalty loop of 150 metres had to be skied per missed target.
^{2} One minute added per missed target.

== Cross-country skiing ==
Men

Event	Athlete	Race	
Event	Athlete	Time	Rank
15 km C	Jari Räsänen	45:04.5	30
15 km C	Jari Laukkanen	44:22.0	25
15 km C	Aki Karvonen	43:54.5	20
15 km C	Harri Kirvesniemi	42:42.8	8
30 km C	Jari Laukkanen	1'35:51.6	52
30 km C	Kari Ristanen	1'31:05.2	27
30 km C	Aki Karvonen	1'29:49.5	19
30 km C	Harri Kirvesniemi	1'26:59.6	9
50 km F	Antti Ticklén	2'18:41.8	45
50 km F	Heikki Kivikko	2'12:27.1	29
50 km F	Harri Kirvesniemi	2'11:41.8	22
50 km F	Kari Ristanen	2'08:08.1	7

C = Classical style, F = Freestyle

Men's 4 × 10 km relay

Athletes	Race	
Athletes	Time	Rank
Jari Laukkanen; Harri Kirvesniemi; Jari Räsänen; Kari Ristanen	1'48:24.0	8

Women

Event	Athlete	Race	
Event	Athlete	Time	Rank
5 km C	Pirkko Määttä	15:51.8	16
5 km C	Tuulikki Pyykkönen	15:38.1	12
5 km C	Marja-Liisa Kirvesniemi	15:16.7	5
5 km C	Marjo Matikainen	15:04.0	1st place, gold medalist(s)
10 km C	Tuulikki Pyykkönen	32:37.7	29
10 km C	Marja-Liisa Kirvesniemi	30:57.0	9
10 km C	Pirkko Määttä	30:52.4	7
10 km C	Marjo Matikainen	30:20.5	3rd place, bronze medalist(s)
20 km F	Eija Hyytiäinen	1'02:06.9	32
20 km F	Jaana Savolainen	1'01:26.8	28
20 km F	Marjo Matikainen	58:50.7	12
20 km F	Marja-Liisa Kirvesniemi	58:45.6	11

C = Classical style, F = Freestyle

Women's 4 × 5 km relay

Athletes	Race	
Athletes	Time	Rank
Pirkko Määttä; Marja-Liisa Kirvesniemi; Marjo Matikainen; Jaana Savolainen	1'01:53.8	3rd place, bronze medalist(s)

== Ice hockey ==
=== Team roster ===
- Head Coach: (Finland) Pentti Matikainen
- Assistant Coach: (Finland) Hannu Jortikka

Pos.	No.	Name	1987–88 team
G	1	Sakari Lindfors	(Finland) HIFK
G	19	Jarmo Myllys	(Finland) Rauman Lukko
G	30	Jukka Tammi	(Finland) Tampereen Ilves
D	2	Teppo Numminen	(Finland) Tampereen Tappara
D	3	Timo Blomqvist	(Sweden) MODO Hockey
D	4	Jyrki Lumme	(Finland) Tampereen Ilves
D	6	Arto Ruotanen	(Sweden) HV71
D	7	Simo Saarinen	(Finland) HIFK
D	9	Kari Eloranta	(Switzerland) HC Lugano
D	16	Jukka Virtanen	(Finland) TPS
D	29	Reijo Ruotsalainen	(Sweden) HV71
F	10	Timo Susi	(Finland) Tampereen Tappara
F	11	Kai Suikkanen	(Finland) Oulun Kärpät
F	13	Jari Torkki	(Finland) Rauman Lukko
F	14	Raimo Helminen	(Finland) Tampereen Ilves
F	15	Iiro Järvi	(Finland) HIFK
F	17	Erkki Laine	(Sweden) Färjestad BK
F	18	Pekka Tuomisto	(Finland) HIFK
F	20	Janne Ojanen	(Finland) Tampereen Tappara
F	21	Erkki Lehtonen	(Finland) Tampereen Tappara
F	24	Reijo Mikkolainen	(Finland) Tampereen Tappara
F	26	Esa Keskinen	(Finland) TPS
F	27	Kari Laitinen	(Finland) HIFK

=== Group A ===
Top three teams (shaded ones) entered the medal round.

Team	Pld	W	L	D	GF	GA	GD	Pts
Finland	5	3	1	1	22	8	+14	7
Sweden	5	2	0	3	23	10	+13	7
Canada	5	3	1	1	17	12	+5	7
Switzerland	5	3	2	0	19	10	+9	6
Poland	5	0	4	1	9	13	−4	1
France	5	1	4	0	10	47	−37	2

Source: HockeyCanada.ca
- Switzerland 2-1 Finland
- Finland 10-1 France
- Finland 3-1 Canada
- Finland 3-3 Sweden
- Finland 5-1 Poland

=== Medal round ===
The top three teams from each group play the top three teams from the other group once. Points from previous games against their own group carry over.

Team	Pld	W	L	D	GF	GA	GD	Pts
Soviet Union	5	4	1	0	25	7	+18	8
Finland	5	3	1	1	18	10	+8	7
Sweden	5	2	1	2	15	16	−1	6
Canada	5	2	2	1	17	14	+3	5
West Germany	5	1	4	0	8	26	−18	2
Czechoslovakia	5	1	4	0	12	22	−10	2

Source: HockeyCanada.ca
- Finland 8-0 West Germany
- Czechoslovakia 5-2 Finland
- Finland 2-1 Soviet Union

=== Leading scorers ===
Rk		GP	G	A	Pts	PIM
7th	Erkki Lehtonen	8	4	6	10	2

== Nordic combined ==
Men's individual

Events:

- normal hill ski jumping (Best two out of three jumps.)
- 15 km cross-country skiing (Start delay, based on ski jumping results.)

Athlete	Event	Ski Jumping		Cross-country		Total	
Athlete	Event	Points	Rank	Start at	Time	Points	Rank
Pasi Saapunki	Individual	193.3	28	3:54.7	42:44.1	402.740	15
Jukka Ylipulli	Individual	196.7	24	3:32.0	42:55.6	401.010	16
Jouko Parviainen	Individual	198.9	20	3:17.4	44:59.6	382.420	33
Sami Leinonen	Individual	202.4	18	2:54.0	42:58.4	400.590	17

Men's Team

Three participants per team.

Events:

- normal hill ski jumping (Three jumps per team member per round, best two rounds counted.)
- 10 km cross-country skiing (Start delay, based on ski jumping results.)

Athletes	Ski jumping		Cross-country		Total
Athletes	Points	Rank	Start at	Time	Rank
Pasi Saapunki; Jouko Parviainen; Jukka Ylipulli	561.3	7	5:42.5	1'25:38.3	7

== Ski jumping ==
Athlete	Event	Jump 1		Jump 2		Total	
Athlete	Event	Distance	Points	Distance	Points	Points	Rank
Risto Laakkonen	Normal hill	81.0	97.2	76.5	86.0	183.2	23
Ari-Pekka Nikkola	Normal hill	83.5	100.2	79.0	90.5	190.7	15
Jari Puikkonen	Normal hill	84.0	105.5	80.0	93.6	199.1	7
Matti Nykänen	Normal hill	89.5	114.8	89.5	114.3	229.1	1st place, gold medalist(s)
Pekka Suorsa	Large hill	99.5	83.7	97.0	79.7	163.4	38
Ari-Pekka Nikkola	Large hill	106.0	97.3	102.0	91.7	189.0	16
Jari Puikkonen	Large hill	106.0	99.3	103.5	95.3	194.6	11
Matti Nykänen	Large hill	118.5	120.8	107.0	103.2	224.0	1st place, gold medalist(s)

Men's team large hill

Athletes	Result	
Athletes	Points ^{1}	Rank
Matti Nykänen; Ari-Pekka Nikkola; Tuomo Ylipulli; Jari Puikkonen	634.4	1st place, gold medalist(s)

^{1} Four teams members performed two jumps each. The best three were counted.

== Speed skating ==
Men

Event	Athlete	Race	
Event	Athlete	Time	Rank
1500 m	Pertti Niittylä	1:56.48	25
5000 m	Timo Järvinen	6:56.68	18
5000 m	Pertti Niittylä	6:55.18	16
10,000 m	Timo Järvinen	14:27.69	17
10,000 m	Pertti Niittylä	14:26.57	15
