= Erkki Laine =

Finnish ice hockey player

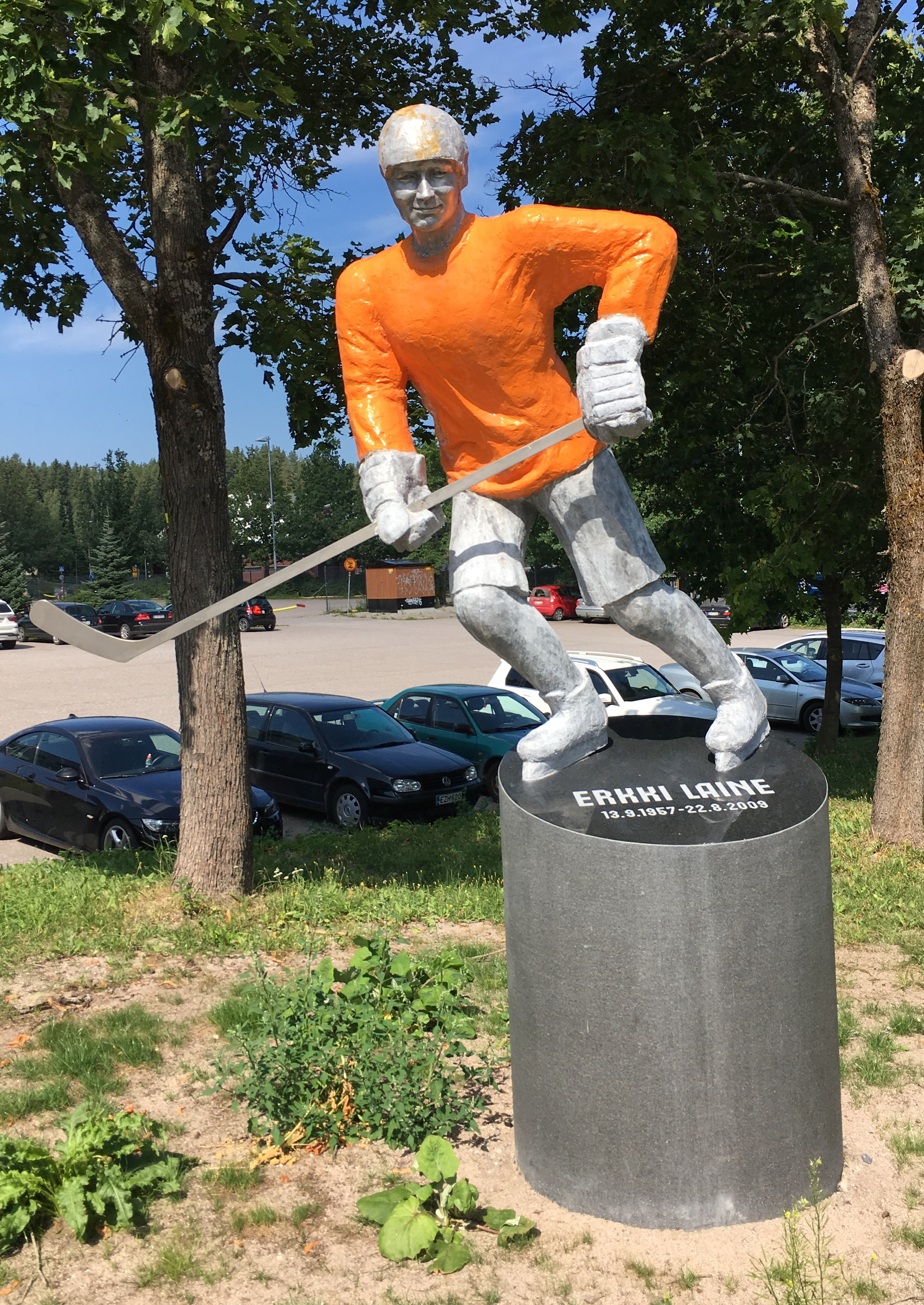
- Memorial statue of Erkki Laine at the Lahden Isku Areena.
- Born: 13 September 1957 Lahti, Finland
- Died: 22 August 2009 (aged 51) Asikkala, Finland
- Height: 174 cm (5 ft 9 in)
- Weight: 78 kg (172 lb; 12 st 4 lb)
- Position: Left wing
- Shot: Right
- Played for: Lahden Reipas; HC Davos; BSC Preussen; Färjestads BK; Leksands IF
- National team: Finland
- Playing career: 1975–1995

Erkki Juhani Laine (13 September 1957 – 22 August 2009) was a Finnish professional ice hockey forward. A two-time Olympian, he won a silver medal with the Finnish national team at the 1988 Winter Olympics in Calgary. He is the Lahti Pelicans franchise's all-time career points earner and goal scorer.

== Playing career ==
As a child, Erkki Laine began playing ice hockey with the youth department of Kiekkoreipas in his hometown of Lahti. The first full season of his professional career was spent with the senior men's representative team of Kiekkoreipas in the 1975–76 I-divisioona season. He led the team in scoring, earning 47 points (40 goals + 7 assists) in 36 regular season games, and ranked second for most goals scored in the I-divisioona (behind Markku Perkkiö‘s 45 goals with Kärpät). With the infusion of Laine’s goal scoring, Kiekkoreipas finished the season at the top of the league and gained promotion to the top-tier SM-liiga. The winger spent the subsequent two seasons with Kiekkoreipas in the SM-liiga.

Laine signed with Leksands IF of the Swedish Elitserien in 1978 and remained with the club for four seasons. In the 1980–81 season, he was the top goal scorer of the Elitserien and his 30 goals accounted for nearly a quarter of all goals scored for Leksands.

In 1982, Laine returned to his home club, Kiekkoreipas, where he was the team’s captain and leading goal scorer in both the 1982–83 and 1983–84 seasons, ranking second and third in the SM-liiga for goals scored respectively. He netted a career high five hat-tricks in the 1982–83 season.

The Finn signed with Färjestad BK (FBK) of the Elitserien in 1984 and was the leading goal scorer in the top Swedish league for the 1984–85 season. In the following season, he was Färjestad’s highest regular season point earner, with 34 points in 31 games, and tied for the league’s most playoff goals with teammate Kent-Erik Andersson and Brynäs‘ Kenneth Andersson. Laine's totals helped Färjestad claim the Swedish Championship (SM) and win the Le Mat Trophy in 1985–86. In the 1986–87 season, he topped Färjestad's statistics for most points and most goals in both the regular season and playoffs. Laine ranked second in the Elitserien in 1986–87 for goals scored, beaten only by Lars-Gunnar Pettersson in the regular season and Ulf Dahlén in the playoffs, both members the 1987 Le Mat winner, IF Björklöven. Färjestad reclaimed the championship title in the subsequent season, boosted by Laine's league-leading seven goals in the playoffs.

For the 1988–89 season, Laine joined the Berliner Schlittschuhclub Preussen (BSC Preussen) of the German Eishockey-Bundesliga. He ranked third on the team for points, notching 14 goals and 25 assists in 36 games, marking the first season in his career in which he earned more assists than goals.

The following season Laine signed with HC Davos in the Swiss National League B, where he posted 24 points in 18 games before returning to Finland mid-season to rejoin his home club, Hockey-Reipas (the men's representative team of Kiekkoreipas was renamed “Hockey-Reipas” in 1989). The club had been competing in the I-divisioona since being relegated in 1986 but Laine's 27 points (16+11) in sixteen games of the regular season, in addition to incredible seasons from Matti Hagman and Oldřich Válek, allowed Hockey-Reipas to finish the season at second place in the league. By finishing in one of the top two positions, Hockey-Reipas qualified for the 1990 SM-liiga relegation series, in which they beat KooKoo and gained promotion to the SM-liiga. Laine was named captain of Hockey-Reipas for the 1990–91 season and remained in the role until his retirement. Hockey-Reipas was relegated to the I-divisioona at the end of the 1993–94 SM-liiga season and Laine retired at the conclusion of the following season, at age 37.

Over the span of his twenty-year professional career, Laine played with five clubs across six leagues in four different countries. With the Lahden Pelicans franchise (Kiekkoreipas/Hockey-Reipas) in Finland, he earned 309 points (185+124) in 324 SM-liiga regular season games and posted 92 points (67+25) in 70 I-divisioona regular season games. He is one of seven players to ever score more than 40 goals in a SM-liiga season, a feat he accomplished in 1982–83. In Sweden, he played 277 games in the Elitserien, producing 275 points, and his 192 career goals rank 19th all-time in the league and second for a Finn. His points per game rank sixth all time for Färjestad BK and sixteenth all-time for Leksands IF, at 1.035 and 0.948 PPG respectively (players appearing in fewer than 30 games excluded from rankings).

== International career ==
Medal record

Representing Finland

Ice hockey

Winter Olympics
Silver medal – second place	1988 Calgary	Team

European U19 Championships
Bronze medal – third place	1976 Czechoslovakia	

Laine's international debut came with the Finnish national under-19 team at the IIHF European Junior Championship in 1976, where Finland won bronze. Laine posted one goal in three games played.

The following year, he was selected to the Finnish national junior team at the 1977 World Junior Ice Hockey Championships in Czechoslovakia. Laine had an excellent performance, posting nine points (5+4) in seven games and earning the second-most points on the team, bested only by the 11 points tallied by Juha Jyrkkiö. Despite quality scoring, the Finns were plagued by poor goaltending and finished the tournament in fourth place.

Laine twice represented Finland with the national team (Leijonat) at the Winter Olympic Games. During the 1984 Sarajevo Olympics, he played in all six games and notched three assists. The Finns were beaten by Czechoslovakia in the group stage and then lost the fifth place game against West Germany, ranking sixth at the conclusion of the tournament.

Laine returned to the Finnish roster for the 1988 Winter Olympics in Calgary, playing in seven games and contributing six points (4+2) to Finland's silver medal-winning performance. He rose to national prominence after scoring two goals in a minute and 51 seconds against Canada, laying the groundwork for an eventual 3–1 victory over the team which was stocked with NHL talent. Both of Laine's goals were assisted by Leijonat legend Raimo Helminen, who described them as the highlights of his career. Laine's four goals tied at first for most goals scored on the Finnish team, an achievement shared with teammates Erkki Lehtonen, Reijo Ruotsalainen, and Reijo Mikkolainen.

Laine had been selected for the Finnish team at the 1980 Lake Placid Olympics, but was unable to attend due to injury.

With the Finnish national team, Laine played a total of 64 matches and scored 19 goals.

== Death ==
Laine went missing on the evening of 22 August 2009, after taking his boat out on Asikkalanselkä, the southernmost part of Lake Päijänne, near the family's summer cottage in Kalkkinen, a village in the Asikkala municipality. Concerns that he may have drowned were given further credence when a significant portion of his boat and debris from an apparent high-speed collision with a rocky islet were found on 24 August. His body was recovered the following day; he had not been wearing a life vest.

On 27 August 2009, the Lahden Pelicans announced that the club would honour Laine at the home game against JYP Jyväskylä on 12 September 2009.

== Memorial ==
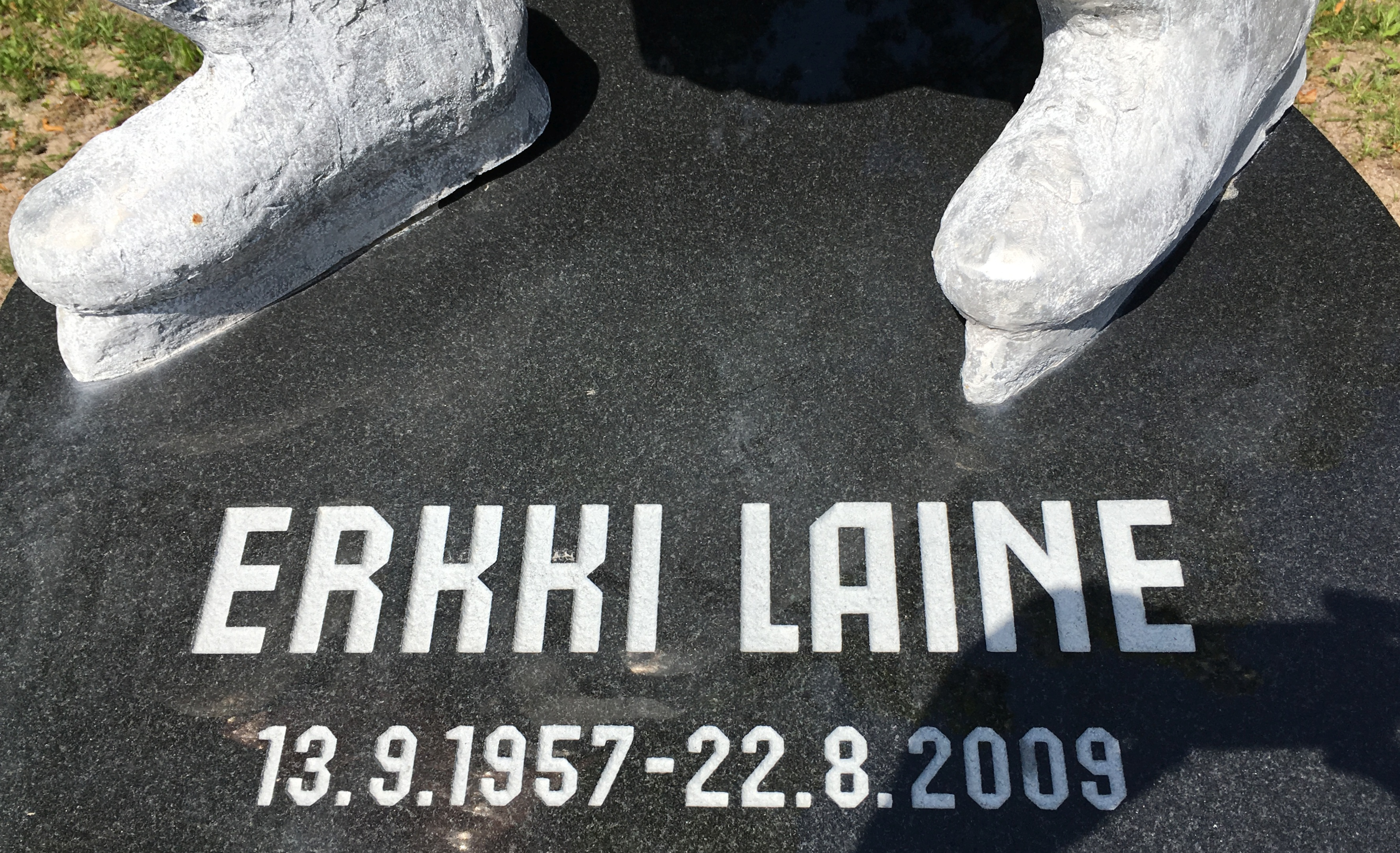
The granite base of the Erkki Laine statue at Isku Areena.

A statue of Erkki Laine stands outside Isku Areena, the home of the Pelicans, in Lahti. The first “hockey statue” in Finland, it was unveiled by Minister of Sports and Culture Sampo Terho and Leijonat assistant coach Kari Eloranta in a ceremony held on 28 November 2017, prior to the Pelicans–HPK game. The ceremony was attended by several hundred people former teammates of Laine's, including Veli-Pekka Ketola and Hannu Koskinen, as well as his wife, daughters, and father, Jukka. During warmups prior to the Liiga match that evening, the Pelicans players donned Laine #13 sweaters in honour of the late winger.

The statue project was jointly commissioned by the Lahden Pelicans, Kiekkoreipas, and SSR Group and was gifted to Lahden Jäähalli Oy, the managing company of Isku Areena, upon its unveiling. Estonian artist Bruno Kadak's design was inspired by hockey player statues erected at ice rinks around the world, particularly those in Toronto. The statue, which was created in Tartu, is made of aluminum on a granite base and stands about three meters tall. It is painted with the colours of Kiekkoreipas.

== Personal life ==
Laine's wife, Erika, was a nationally competitive swimmer. Their eldest daughter, Essi, was born in 1984 in Lahti while Laine was playing with Kiekkoreipas, and their second daughter, Emma, was born in 1986 in Karlstad, Sweden while he was playing with Färjestad BK. Both children played tennis professionally; Essi retired from competition in 2008 and Emma in 2019. Emma Laine retired as Finland's most successful female tennis player and her historic accomplishments early in her career are credited with inspiring a new generation of women's players in Finland. Erkki Laine often traveled with Emma for international competitions when her coaches could not. Emma felt that having her father travel with her was positive, saying in a 2007 interview, “I really trust him. He's helped me a lot, not with tactics and strokes, but with how to be an athlete. Every time he gives me advice, I believe him because he was an athlete and he knows what it takes.”

After his retirement from hockey, Laine worked in the haulage industry. In 2004, he and civil engineer Mika Wilenius purchased Salpausselän Rakentajat (SSR Group), a nation-wide construction firm, from the heir of the previous owner.

Retired NHL defenceman and former Pelicans head coach Kari Eloranta was a lifelong friend of Laine's. The two met while playing on the same regional youth ice hockey team in the late 1960s and remained teammates through the early years of their professional careers, playing with Kiekkoreipas and signing together with Leksands in 1978. After Eloranta moved to North America to play in the NHL in 1981, the players were reunited on the Finnish Olympic national team at the 1988 Calgary Olympics, which culminated with them winning silver together. They played on the same professional team twice more in their careers, in 1989, when Laine briefly played with HC Davos, and during the 1990–91 SM-liiga season, when both played with their “home club,” Hockey Reipas. Though their time as teammates ended in 1991, the two lived on the same street in Lahti and their cottages were near by. Several weeks before Laine's sudden death, he and Eloranta had traveled together to Leksand, Sweden to attend Leksand IF's 90th anniversary celebrations, where they were honoured guests and played in the anniversary alumni game.

== Career statistics ==
=== Regular season and playoffs ===
			Regular season					Playoffs
Season	Team	League	GP	G	A	Pts	PIM	GP	G	A	Pts	PIM
1973–74	Lahden Reipas	FIN U20	14	—	—	—	—	—	—	—	—	—
1974–75	Lahden Reipas	2-div	14	10	4	14	2	—	—	—	—	—
1975–76	Kiekkoreipas	1-div	36	40	7	47	29	6	4	3	7	0
1976–77	Kiekkoreipas	Liiga	35	26	13	39	16	—	—	—	—	—
1977–78	Kiekkoreipas	Liiga	36	19	5	24	33	—	—	—	—	—
1978–79	Leksands IF	SEL	36	22	8	30	26	3	3	1	4	4
1979–80	Leksands IF	SEL	26	21	5	26	30	2	0	0	0	0
1980–81	Leksands IF	SEL	36	30	6	36	24	—	—	—	—	—
1981–82	Leksands IF	SEL	36	22	13	35	32	—	—	—	—	—
1982–83	Kiekkoreipas	Liiga	36	41	15	56	27	—	—	—	—	—
1983–84	Kiekkoreipas	Liiga	33	29	11	40	24	—	—	—	—	—
1984–85	Färjestad BK	SEL	36	28	11	39	22	3	0	2	2	4
1985–86	Färjestad BK	SEL	31	18	16	34	28	8	5	2	7	4
1986–87	Färjestad BK	SEL	36	26	10	36	32	7	5	4	9	6
1987–88	Färjestad BK	SEL	40	25	14	39	22	9	7	2	9	6
1988–89	BSC Preussen	DEB	36	14	25	39	18	—	—	—	—	—
1989–90	HC Davos	NL-B	18	15	9	24	18	—	—	—	—	—
1989–90	Hockey Reipas	1-div	16	16	11	27	10	—	—	—	—	—
1990–91	Hockey Reipas	Liiga	44	22	20	42	20	—	—	—	—	—
1990–91	Kiekko-67	1-div	2	0	0	0	0	—	—	—	—	—
1991–92	Hockey Reipas	Liiga	43	15	22	37	22	—	—	—	—	—
1992–93	Reipas Lahti	Liiga	48	21	26	47	30	—	—	—	—	—
1993–94	Reipas Lahti	Liiga	44	10	10	20	30	—	—	—	—	—
1994–95	Reipas Lahti	1-div	16	11	7	18	12	—	—	—	—	—
SM-liiga totals			319	183	122	305	202	—	—	—	—	—
Elitserien totals			277	192	83	275	216	32	20	11	31	24

=== International ===
Year	Team	Event	GP	G	A	Pts	PIM
1976	Finland	EJC	3	1	0	1	2
1977	Finland	WJC	7	5	4	9	10
1984	Finland	OG	6	0	3	3	4
1988	Finland	OG	7	4	2	6	2
Junior totals			10	6	4	10	12
Senior totals			13	4	5	9	6

== Awards and honours ==
Award	Year
Finland
SM-liiga Most Goals Scored by a Rookie	1976–77 (26 goals)
SM-liiga Most Points Earned by a Rookie	1976–77 (39 points)
SM-liiga Most Power Play Goals	1982–83 (9 PPG) 1983–84 (13 PPG)
Number #13 retired by the Lahti Pelicans	
Hockey Hall of Fame Finland; Suomen Jääkiekkoleijona #241	2017
Sweden
Elitserien Most Goals – Regular season	1980–81 (30 goals) 1984–85 (28 goals)
Elitserien Most Goals – Playoffs	1986 (5 goals) 1988 (7 goals)
Le Mat Trophy champion	1986 1988

== Records ==
- SM-liiga +40 goals in a single season: 41 goals, 1982–83
- Pelicans franchise record most goals, career: 260 goals
- Pelicans franchise record most points, career: 411 points
