= Janne Laukkanen =

Finnish ice hockey player (born 1970)

- Born: March 19, 1970 (age 56) Lahti, Finland
- Height: 6 ft 1 in (185 cm)
- Weight: 196 lb (89 kg; 14 st 0 lb)
- Position: Defence
- Shot: Left
- Played for: Reipas Lahti; HPK; HC České Budějovice; Quebec Nordiques; Colorado Avalanche; Ottawa Senators; Pittsburgh Penguins; Tampa Bay Lightning
- National team: Finland
- NHL draft: 156th overall, 1991; Quebec Nordiques
- Playing career: 1988–2003

Janne Laukkanen (born March 19, 1970) is a Finnish former professional ice hockey player. He played in the National Hockey League for the Quebec Nordiques/Colorado Avalanche franchise, the Ottawa Senators, Pittsburgh Penguins, and the Tampa Bay Lightning. He played a total 407 regular season games scoring 22 goals and 121 points with 335 penalty minutes. He also played 59 playoff games, scoring 7 goals and 16 points.

He was a member of the bronze medal-winning Finnish ice hockey team at the 1994 and 1998 Winter Olympics.

He now works with Karhu-Kissat, a minor hockey league team in his native Finland, which includes his son Matias.

== Career statistics ==
=== Regular season and playoffs ===
			Regular season					Playoffs
Season	Team	League	GP	G	A	Pts	PIM	GP	G	A	Pts	PIM
1987–88	Kiekkoreipas	FIN.2 U20	20	5	5	10	48	—	—	—	—	—
1988–89	Kiekkoreipas	FIN.2 U20	19	13	10	23	85	—	—	—	—	—
1988–89	Kiekkoreipas	FIN.2	33	1	7	8	24	—	—	—	—	—
1989–90	Hockey Reipas	FIN.2	44	8	22	30	60	4	1	1	2	6
1990–91	Hockey Reipas	SM-l	44	8	13	21	54	—	—	—	—	—
1991–92	HPK	SM-l	43	5	14	19	62	—	—	—	—	—
1992–93	HPK	SM-l	47	8	21	29	76	12	1	4	5	10
1993–94	HPK	SM-l	48	5	24	29	46	—	—	—	—	—
1993–94	HC České Budějovice	ELH	—	—	—	—	—	3	0	1	1	0
1994–95	Cornwall Aces	AHL	55	8	26	34	41	—	—	—	—	—
1994–95	Quebec Nordiques	NHL	11	0	3	3	4	6	1	0	1	2
1995–96	Cornwall Aces	AHL	35	7	20	27	60	—	—	—	—	—
1995–96	Colorado Avalanche	NHL	3	1	0	1	0	—	—	—	—	—
1995–96	Ottawa Senators	NHL	20	0	2	2	14	—	—	—	—	—
1996–97	Ottawa Senators	NHL	76	3	18	21	76	7	0	1	1	6
1997–98	Ottawa Senators	NHL	60	4	17	21	64	11	2	2	4	8
1998–99	Ottawa Senators	NHL	50	1	11	12	40	4	0	0	0	4
1999–2000	Ottawa Senators	NHL	60	1	11	12	55	—	—	—	—	—
1999–2000	Pittsburgh Penguins	NHL	11	1	7	8	12	11	2	4	6	10
2000–01	Pittsburgh Penguins	NHL	50	3	17	20	34	18	2	2	4	14
2001–02	Pittsburgh Penguins	NHL	47	6	7	13	28	—	—	—	—	—
2002–03	Pittsburgh Penguins	NHL	17	1	6	7	8	—	—	—	—	—
2002–03	Hartford Wolf Pack	AHL	5	0	3	3	2	—	—	—	—	—
2002–03	Tampa Bay Lightning	NHL	2	1	0	1	0	2	0	0	0	2
SM-l totals			182	26	72	98	238	12	1	4	5	10
NHL totals			407	22	99	121	335	59	7	9	16	46

=== International ===
Medal record

Representing Finland

Ice hockey

Olympic Games
Bronze medal – third place	1994 Lillehammer	
Bronze medal – third place	1998 Nagano	

World Championships
Silver medal – second place	1992 Prague	
Silver medal – second place	1994 Milan	
Silver medal – second place	1998 Switzerland	

Year	Team	Event	Result	GP	G	A	Pts	PIM
1990	Finland	WJC	4th	7	0	1	1	4
1991	Finland	CC	SF	6	1	2	3	2
1992	Finland	OG	7th	8	0	1	1	6
1992	Finland	WC	2nd place, silver medalist(s)	8	2	2	4	12
1993	Finland	WC	7th	6	1	0	1	10
1994	Finland	OG	3rd place, bronze medalist(s)	8	0	2	2	12
1994	Finland	WC	2nd place, silver medalist(s)	8	1	2	3	6
1996	Finland	WCH	QF	4	0	0	0	4
1998	Finland	OG	3rd place, bronze medalist(s)	6	0	0	0	4
1998	Finland	WC	2nd place, silver medalist(s)	1	0	0	0	0
Junior totals				7	0	1	1	4
Senior totals				46	6	9	15	43
