= Ville Sirén =

Ice hockey player

- Born: February 11, 1964 (age 62) Tampere, Finland
- Height: 6 ft 2 in (188 cm)
- Weight: 196 lb (89 kg; 14 st 0 lb)
- Position: Defence
- Shot: Left
- Played for: Ilves (SM-liiga); Pittsburgh Penguins; Minnesota North Stars; HPK (SM-liiga); Luleå HF (Elitserien); SC Bern (NLA); HIFK (SM-liiga)
- National team: Finland
- NHL draft: 23rd overall, 1983; Hartford Whalers
- Playing career: 1982–1999

Ville Jussi Sirén (born February 11, 1964, in Tampere, Finland) is a retired Finnish professional ice hockey defender.

He is currently the head amateur scout for the Columbus Blue Jackets. He has previously worked as a scout for the St. Louis Blues, Washington Capitals and Ilves.

== Career statistics ==
=== Regular season and playoffs ===
			Regular season					Playoffs
Season	Team	League	GP	G	A	Pts	PIM	GP	G	A	Pts	PIM
1981–82	Ilves	FIN U20	30	13	12	25	40	—	—	—	—	—
1982–83	Ilves	SM-l	29	3	2	5	42	8	1	3	4	8
1983–84	Ilves	SM-l	36	1	10	11	40	2	0	0	0	2
1984–85	Ilves	SM-l	36	11	13	24	24	9	0	2	2	10
1985–86	Pittsburgh Penguins	NHL	60	4	8	12	32	—	—	—	—	—
1986–87	Pittsburgh Penguins	NHL	69	5	17	22	50	—	—	—	—	—
1987–88	Pittsburgh Penguins	NHL	58	1	20	21	62	—	—	—	—	—
1988–89	Pittsburgh Penguins	NHL	12	1	0	1	14	—	—	—	—	—
1988–89	Minnesota North Stars	NHL	38	2	10	12	58	4	0	0	0	4
1989–90	Minnesota North Stars	NHL	53	1	13	14	60	3	0	0	0	2
1990–91	HPK	SM-l	44	4	9	13	90	8	1	1	2	37
1991–92	Ilves	SM-l	43	8	14	22	88	—	—	—	—	—
1992–93	Luleå HF	SEL	37	3	11	14	84	11	0	0	0	22
1993–94	Luleå HF	SEL	40	4	11	15	65	—	—	—	—	—
1994–95	Västerås IK	SEL	37	1	4	5	44	4	0	1	1	4
1995–96	EHC Kloten	SUI.2	24	3	13	16	54	—	—	—	—	—
1995–96	SC Bern	NDA	6	1	2	3	8	11	3	7	10	18
1996–97	SC Bern	NDA	42	10	11	21	72	12	1	5	6	47
1997–98	SC Bern	NDA	36	3	9	12	96	7	1	4	5	26
1997–98	SG Cortina	ITA	—	—	—	—	—	2	1	2	3	0
1998–99	HIFK	SM-l	34	3	2	5	42	11	0	0	0	12
SM-l totals			224	30	50	80	326	38	2	6	8	69
NHL totals			290	14	68	82	276	7	0	0	0	6
SEL totals			114	8	26	34	193	15	0	1	1	26

=== International ===
Year	Team	Event	GP	G	A	Pts	PIM
1982	Finland	EJC	5	1	0	1	8
1983	Finland	WJC	7	1	1	2	6
1984	Finland	WJC	7	0	2	2	4
1984	Finland	OLY	6	0	1	1	2
1985	Finland	WC	5	0	0	0	8
1987	Finland	CC	5	0	0	0	6
1991	Finland	WC	10	2	2	4	16
1991	Finland	CC	6	0	1	1	15
1992	Finland	OLY	8	0	2	2	16
1993	Finland	WC	6	0	0	0	6
Junior totals			19	2	3	5	18
Senior totals			46	2	6	8	69
