= Jari Torkki =

Finnish ice hockey player

- Born: August 11, 1965 (age 60) Rauma, FIN
- Height: 5 ft 11 in (180 cm)
- Weight: 182 lb (83 kg; 13 st 0 lb)
- Position: Right wing
- Shot: Left
- Played for: NHL; Chicago Blackhawks; SM-liiga; Lukko; DEL; Star Bulls Rosenheim; Serie A HC Merano; HC Milano; BISL; Bracknell Bees
- National team: Finland
- NHL draft: 115th overall, 1983; Chicago Blackhawks
- Playing career: 1981–2003

Jari Kaarlo Torkki (born August 11, 1965, in Rauma, Finland) is a retired professional ice hockey player who played in the National Hockey League and SM-liiga. He also won a silver medal at the 1988 Olympics with Team Finland.

== Career ==
Jari Torkki played his entire SM-liiga career for Lukko, a team located in Rauma, Finland. Torkki along with Erik Hämäläinen has an iconic status in Lukko and is held in high regard by Lukko fans.

Despite having a good form in SM-liiga, Torkki did not have a great career in NHL. Torkki played two seasons in North America and played for the Chicago Blackhawks of the NHL. Torkki also played for IHL teams Saginaw Hawks and Indianapolis Ice during his two-season tenure in North America.

After his short NHL visit, Torkki returned to Lukko and played 6 more seasons for Lukko, totaling 13 seasons in Lukko.

After playing for Lukko, Torkki to play for Star Bulls Rosenheim, of DEL, HC Merano and HC Milano of Italian Serie A and finally, Bracknell Bees of the British Ice Hockey Superleague (BISL).

Jari Torkki was also an Olympian as a member of Finland's team who took home Silver in Calgary 1988.

Jari Torkki retired in 2003.

== Career statistics ==
=== Regular season and playoffs ===
			Regular season					Playoffs
Season	Team	League	GP	G	A	Pts	PIM	GP	G	A	Pts	PIM
1981–82	Lukko	FIN Jr.	8	15	10	25	10	—	—	—	—	—
1981–82	Lukko	Liiga	1	0	0	0	0	—	—	—	—	—
1982–83	Lukko	FIN Jr.	7	8	6	14	24	—	—	—	—	—
1982–83	Lukko	Liiga	34	13	17	30	34	—	—	—	—	—
1983–84	Lukko	FIN Jr.	1	3	0	3	2	—	—	—	—	—
1983–84	Lukko	FIN II	36	41	25	66	70	—	—	—	—	—
1984–85	Lukko	Liiga	36	25	21	46	40	—	—	—	—	—
1985–86	Lukko	Liiga	32	22	18	40	40	—	—	—	—	—
1986–87	Lukko	Liiga	44	27	8	35	42	—	—	—	—	—
1987–88	Lukko	Liiga	43	23	24	47	54	8	4	3	7	12
1988–89	Chicago Blackhawks	NHL	4	1	0	1	0	—	—	—	—	—
1988–89	Saginaw Hawks	IHL	72	30	42	72	22	—	—	—	—	—
1989–90	Indianapolis Ice	IHL	66	25	29	54	50	—	—	—	—	—
1990–91	Lukko	Liiga	44	23	26	49	52	—	—	—	—	—
1991–92	Lukko	Liiga	44	16	19	35	34	2	0	0	0	4
1992–93	Lukko	Liiga	48	17	14	31	38	3	1	0	1	0
1993–94	Lukko	Liiga	46	14	18	32	22	9	4	1	5	8
1994–95	Lukko	Liiga	33	14	30	44	48	9	2	0	2	4
1995–96	Lukko	Liiga	48	16	20	36	50	8	0	1	1	10
1996–97	Starbulls Rosenheim	DEL	47	17	18	35	80	3	0	1	1	6
1997–98	Starbulls Rosenheim	DEL	41	10	14	24	20	—	—	—	—	—
1998–99	HC Merano	Alp	27	7	7	14	18	—	—	—	—	—
1998–99	HC Merano	ITA	16	11	12	23	10	9	2	3	5	4
1999–2000	HC Merano	ITA	21	11	24	35	38	—	—	—	—	—
2000–01	HC Milano	ITA	18	14	13	27	16	10	7	15	22	12
2001–02	HC Merano	ITA	11	8	2	10	2	—	—	—	—	—
2001–02	Bracknell Bees	GBR	10	1	1	2	2	—	—	—	—	—
Liiga totals			453	210	215	425	454	39	11	5	16	38
ITA totals			66	44	51	95	66	19	9	18	27	16

=== International ===
Year	Team	Event	GP	G	A	Pts	PIM
1982	Finland	EJC	—	—	—	—	—
1983	Finland	EJC	5	6	1	7	10
1984	Finland	WJC	7	4	2	6	8
1987	Finland	WC	10	5	2	7	12
1988	Finland	OG	4	1	0	1	2
Junior totals			19	15	7	22	26
Senior totals			14	6	2	8	14
