= Pekka Tuomisto =

Finnish ice hockey player

- Born: 29 December 1960 (age 65) Oulu, FIN
- Height: 6 ft 0 in (183 cm)
- Weight: 185 lb (84 kg; 13 st 3 lb)
- Position: Right wing
- Shot: Right
- Played for: Kärpät; HIFK
- National team: Finland
- Playing career: 1980–1996

Pekka Juhani Tuomisto (born 29 December 1960) is a Finnish retired professional ice hockey player who played in the SM-liiga. Born in Oulu, Finland, he played for Kärpät and HIFK.

Tuomisto was inducted into the Finnish Hockey Hall of Fame in 2000.

== Career statistics ==
=== Regular season and playoffs ===
			Regular season					Playoffs
Season	Team	League	GP	G	A	Pts	PIM	GP	G	A	Pts	PIM
1980–81	Kärpät	SM-l	36	8	4	12	10	12	2	0	2	2
1981–82	Kärpät	SM-l	36	13	8	21	38	3	0	0	0	0
1982–83	Kärpät	SM-l	34	9	5	14	28	—	—	—	—	—
1983–84	Kärpät	SM-l	37	11	14	25	28	10	1	3	4	8
1984–85	Kärpät	SM-l	36	8	7	15	26	7	2	3	5	4
1985–86	Kärpät	SM-l	36	13	12	25	24	5	2	1	3	0
1986–87	Kärpät	SM-l	44	28	19	47	42	9	3	3	6	4
1987–88	HIFK	SM-l	44	26	17	43	36	6	2	3	5	6
1988–89	HIFK	SM-l	44	18	18	36	48	2	0	1	1	2
1989–90	HIFK	SM-l	35	13	19	32	20	2	1	0	1	0
1990–91	HIFK	SM-l	42	21	8	29	49	3	1	1	2	0
1991–92	HIFK	SM-l	44	22	13	35	51	9	0	4	4	0
1992–93	HIFK	SM-l	39	15	14	29	22	4	0	0	0	2
1993–94	HIFK	SM-l	34	13	5	18	22	3	1	0	1	0
1994–95	HIFK	SM-l	44	6	9	15	16	3	0	0	0	0
1995–96	HIFK	SM-l	43	2	5	7	20	3	0	0	0	27
SM-l totals			628	226	177	403	480	81	15	19	34	55

=== International ===
Year	Team	Event	GP	G	A	Pts	PIM
1980	Finland	WJC	5	0	1	1	2
1988	Finland	OG	8	2	1	3	4
1991	Finland	WC	7	0	0	0	2
1992	Finland	OG	8	3	1	4	6
1992	Finland	WC	8	2	0	2	4
Senior totals			31	7	2	9	16
