= Jukka Virtanen (ice hockey) =

Finnish ice hockey player

- Born: July 15, 1959 (age 66) Turku, Finland
- Height: 6 ft 0 in (183 cm)
- Weight: 187 lb (85 kg; 13 st 5 lb)
- Position: Defence
- Shot: Left
- Played for: Ässät; TPS
- National team: Finland
- Playing career: 1979–1993

Jukka Einar Virtanen (born July 15, 1959) is a retired professional ice hockey player who played in the SM-liiga. He played for Ässät and TPS. He also won a silver medal at the 1988 Winter Olympics.

== Career statistics ==
=== Regular season and playoffs ===
			Regular season					Playoffs
Season	Team	League	GP	G	A	Pts	PIM	GP	G	A	Pts	PIM
1979–80	Ässät	Liiga	22	0	0	0	0	7	0	0	0	2
1980–81	Ässät	Liiga	27	2	5	7	10	2	0	0	0	0
1981–82	Ässät	Liiga	36	2	3	5	14	9	2	1	3	2
1982–83	Ässät	Liiga	36	4	7	11	22	—	—	—	—	—
1983–84	TPS	Liiga	37	5	9	14	12	10	1	0	1	10
1984–85	TPS	Liiga	35	2	6	8	18	10	1	0	1	4
1985–86	TPS	Liiga	36	5	3	8	24	7	1	0	1	6
1986–87	TPS	Liiga	43	8	6	14	50	5	0	1	1	4
1987–88	TPS	Liiga	32	2	7	9	22	—	—	—	—	—
1988–89	TPS	Liiga	43	2	4	6	22	10	3	1	4	8
1989–90	TPS	Liiga	39	3	4	7	24	9	1	0	1	4
1990–91	TPS	Liiga	42	3	4	7	14	9	0	2	2	4
1991–92	TPS	Liiga	44	4	8	12	42	3	0	0	0	0
1992–93	TPS	Liiga	35	1	4	5	30	12	3	1	4	2
1992–93	Kiekko-67	FIN II	2	0	0	0	2	—	—	—	—	—
Liiga totals			507	43	70	113	304	93	12	6	18	46

=== International ===
Year	Team	Event	GP	G	A	Pts	PIM
1986	Finland	WC	10	2	0	2	12
1987	Finland	WC	7	0	2	2	10
1988	Finland	OG	5	0	1	1	0
Senior totals			22	2	3	5	22
