= Timo Susi =

Finnish ice hockey player

- Born: January 25, 1959 (age 67) Kouvola, Finland
- Height: 5 ft 10 in (178 cm)
- Weight: 176 lb (80 kg; 12 st 8 lb)
- Position: Left wing
- Shot: Left
- Liiga team Former teams: Tappara; KooKoo
- NHL draft: Undrafted
- Playing career: 1978–1992

Medal record

Representing Finland

Olympic Games
Silver medal – second place	1988 Calgary	Ice hockey

European Championship
Bronze medal – third place	1986 Soviet Union	
Bronze medal – third place	1987 Austria	

Timo Antero Susi (born January 25, 1959, in Kouvola, Finland) is a retired professional ice hockey player who played in the SM-liiga. He played for Tappara. He was inducted into the Finnish Hockey Hall of Fame in 2000.

== Career statistics ==
=== Regular season and playoffs ===
			Regular season					Playoffs
Season	Team	League	GP	G	A	Pts	PIM	GP	G	A	Pts	PIM
1974–75	KooKoo	FIN II	11	0	0	0	0	—	—	—	—	—
1975–76	KooKoo	FIN II	36	12	7	19	16	—	—	—	—	—
1976–77	KooKoo	FIN II	36	20	14	34	28	—	—	—	—	—
1977–78	KooKoo	FIN II	35	24	18	42	77	—	—	—	—	—
1978–79	Tappara	Liiga	36	17	7	24	18	10	2	2	4	15
1979–80	Tappara	Liiga	36	23	6	29	45	—	—	—	—	—
1980–81	Tappara	Liiga	35	22	9	31	30	8	4	5	9	6
1981–82	Tappara	Liiga	36	24	18	42	34	11	2	6	8	0
1982–83	Tappara	Liiga	36	20	21	41	28	8	1	3	4	8
1983–84	Tappara	Liiga	37	24	16	40	33	9	5	4	9	8
1984–85	Tappara	Liiga	35	28	17	45	26	—	—	—	—	—
1985–86	Tappara	Liiga	36	19	21	40	14	8	5	7	12	6
1986–87	Tappara	Liiga	44	22	29	51	24	9	7	4	11	4
1987–88	Tappara	Liiga	40	23	22	45	12	10	6	9	15	2
1988–89	Tappara	Liiga	44	32	30	62	16	8	2	3	5	2
1989–90	Tappara	Liiga	44	18	25	43	16	7	3	7	10	6
1990–91	Tappara	Liiga	44	16	17	33	20	3	1	0	1	0
1991–92	Tappara	Liiga	42	5	3	8	10	—	—	—	—	—
FIN II totals			118	56	39	95	121	—	—	—	—	—
Liiga totals			545	293	241	534	326	91	38	50	88	57

=== International ===
Year	Team	Event	GP	G	A	Pts	PIM
1978	Finland	WJC	6	7	3	10	2
1979	Finland	WJC	6	0	2	2	8
1980	Finland	OG	7	0	0	0	4
1983	Finland	WC	9	0	0	0	0
1986	Finland	WC	7	2	4	6	0
1987	Finland	WC	10	2	3	5	4
1988	Finland	OG	8	2	6	8	4
1989	Finland	WC	9	1	1	2	2
Junior totals			12	7	5	12	10
Senior totals			50	7	14	21	14
