= Simo Saarinen =

Finnish ice hockey player (born 1963)

- Born: February 14, 1963 (age 63) Helsinki, FIN
- Height: 5 ft 10 in (178 cm)
- Weight: 178 lb (81 kg; 12 st 10 lb)
- Position: Defence
- Shot: Left
- Played for: HIFK; New York Rangers
- National team: Finland
- NHL draft: 193rd overall, 1982; New York Rangers
- Playing career: 1980–1996

Simo Olavi Saarinen (born February 14, 1963, in Helsinki, Finland) is a retired professional ice hockey defenceman

== Playing career ==
Simo Saarinen started his career in his hometown team Helsingin IFK. Saarinen played once in the European Junior Ice Hockey Championships and twice in the World Junior Ice Hockey Championships and was soon noticed by NHL scouts. Saarinen was drafted by New York Rangers in the 1982 NHL entry draft. After 1984 Olympic Ice Hockey tournament Saarinen went to NHL. Saarinen was injured during his debut season for New York Rangers. Due to the injuries Saarinen did not play in the 1985–86 season and returned to HIFK for 1986–87 season. Saarinen played for HIFK until 1996 when he finally retired from active playing.

== After retirement ==
After retiring in 1996 Saarinen started to referee ice hockey games in Finland. Saarinen refereed his first SM-liiga games in the 2001–2002 SM-Liiga season. Currently Saarinen referees hockey games in Helsinki and Southern Finland area.

== International play ==
Olympic medal record

Men's Ice hockey
Silver medal – second place	1988 Calgary	Ice hockey

For Finland Saarinen played twice in Ice Hockey World Championships and three times in Olympic Hockey Tournament. Saarinen was part of the historic Ice Hockey at the 1988 Winter Olympics Ice Hockey Team which won Finland's first international tournament medal, a silver one.

== Career statistics ==
=== Regular season and playoffs ===
			Regular season					Playoffs
Season	Team	League	GP	G	A	Pts	PIM	GP	G	A	Pts	PIM
1980–81	HIFK	SM-l	20	1	0	1	4	2	0	0	0	0
1981–82	HIFK	SM-l	36	5	10	15	20	8	1	3	4	6
1982–83	HIFK	SM-l	36	9	6	15	24	9	0	1	1	14
1983–84	HIFK	SM-l	36	7	7	14	32	2	0	0	0	0
1984–85	New York Rangers	NHL	8	0	0	0	0	—	—	—	—	—
1985–86	New Haven Nighthawks	AHL	13	3	4	7	11	—	—	—	—	—
1986–87	HIFK	SM-l	36	1	6	7	12	5	1	1	2	2
1987–88	HIFK	SM-l	39	8	11	19	29	6	2	2	4	2
1988–89	HIFK	SM-l	34	1	7	8	14	2	0	1	1	0
1989–90	HIFK	SM-l	41	9	11	20	38	2	0	1	1	2
1990–91	HIFK	SM-l	27	3	8	11	12	—	—	—	—	—
1991–92	HIFK	SM-l	43	5	18	23	14	7	0	0	0	2
1992–93	HIFK	SM-l	46	7	5	12	22	4	0	3	3	0
1993–94	HIFK	SM-l	40	4	5	9	38	3	0	1	1	0
1994–95	HIFK	SM-l	42	7	7	14	40	3	0	0	0	2
1995–96	HIFK	SM-l	30	4	3	7	32	1	1	0	1	0
SM-l totals			506	71	104	175	331	54	5	13	18	30

=== International ===
Year	Team	Event	GP	G	A	Pts	PIM
1981	Finland	EJC	5	1	1	2	2
1982	Finland	WJC	7	3	3	6	6
1983	Finland	WJC	7	3	3	6	4
1984	Finland	OG	6	1	0	1	14
1988	Finland	OG	7	0	2	2	4
1989	Finland	WC	5	0	0	0	2
1990	Finland	WC	7	0	3	3	6
1992	Finland	OG	5	0	1	1	6
Junior totals			19	7	7	14	12
Senior totals			30	1	6	7	34
