= Kari Laitinen =

Finnish ice hockey player

- Born: April 9, 1964 (age 61) Vantaa, Finland
- Height: 5 ft 10 in (178 cm)
- Weight: 181 lb (82 kg; 12 st 13 lb)
- Position: Right wing
- Shot: Left
- Played for: Jokerit; HIFK; Jokipojat; Ducs d'Angers; Chamonix HC; Lahti Pelicans
- National team: Finland
- NHL draft: Undrafted
- Playing career: 1985–1998

Olympic medal record

Men's Ice hockey
Silver medal – second place	1988 Calgary	Ice hockey

Kari Juhani Laitinen (born April 9, 1964) is a Finnish ice hockey player. He won a silver medal at the 1988 Winter Olympics.

== Career statistics ==
=== Regular season and playoffs ===
			Regular season					Playoffs
Season	Team	League	GP	G	A	Pts	PIM	GP	G	A	Pts	PIM
1985–86	Jokerit	Liiga	36	19	9	28	4	—	—	—	—	—
1986–87	Jokerit	Liiga	42	27	13	40	31	—	—	—	—	—
1987–88	HIFK	Liiga	43	26	20	46	22	6	4	0	4	0
1988–89	HIFK	Liiga	44	14	10	24	22	2	0	1	1	2
1989–90	HIFK	Liiga	40	20	11	31	18	2	0	1	1	0
1990–91	HIFK	Liiga	34	12	4	16	24	3	2	0	2	0
1991–92	HIFK	Liiga	25	17	7	24	20	9	0	1	1	0
1992–93	HIFK	Liiga	45	8	2	10	14	4	0	0	0	0
1993–94	JoKP	FIN II	46	23	37	60	42	6	3	0	3	6
1994–95	Ducs d'Angers	FRA	14	3	4	7	12	1	0	0	0	0
1995–96	Chamonix HC	FRA	27	18	14	32	10	5	4	1	5	0
1996–97	Pelicans	FIN II	43	22	22	44	20	4	0	0	0	0
1997–98	Pelicans	FIN II	44	14	13	27	24	8	4	4	8	4
Liiga totals			309	143	76	219	155	32	14	6	20	6
FIN II totals			133	73	58	131	86	18	7	4	11	10

=== International ===
Year	Team	Event	GP	G	A	Pts	PIM
1988	Finland	OG	7	3	2	5	0
