= Reijo Mikkolainen =

Finnish ice hockey player

Reijo Kalevi Mikkolainen (born May 14, 1964 in Pirkkala, Finland) is a retired professional ice hockey player who played in the SM-liiga. He won a silver medal with the Finland team at the 1988 Winter Olympics. He played for Tappara, Ilves, and TPS. He was inducted into the Finnish Hockey Hall of Fame in 2005.

== Career statistics ==
=== Regular season and playoffs ===
			Regular season					Playoffs
Season	Team	League	GP	G	A	Pts	PIM	GP	G	A	Pts	PIM
1981–82	Tappara	FIN Jr.	28	9	7	16	27	3	—	—	—	—
1983–84	Tappara	Liiga	17	1	4	5	22	8	2	1	3	2
1984–85	Tappara	Liiga	17	0	6	6	11	—	—	—	—	—
1985–86	Tappara	Liiga	29	5	2	7	6	8	0	1	1	0
1986–87	Tappara	Liiga	44	19	16	35	26	9	4	1	5	4
1987–88	Tappara	Liiga	43	11	7	18	18	9	1	0	1	0
1988–89	Tappara	Liiga	43	16	21	37	29	8	1	6	7	18
1989–90	TPS	Liiga	43	15	17	32	21	9	4	1	5	8
1990–91	TPS	Liiga	44	28	17	45	16	9	0	3	3	4
1991–92	TPS	Liiga	33	5	2	7	8	3	0	0	0	0
1992–93	TPS	Liiga	43	7	7	14	10	—	—	—	—	—
1993–94	TPS	Liiga	21	0	5	5	4	2	0	0	0	0
1993–94	Kiekko-67	FIN II	20	5	7	12	8	—	—	—	—	—
1994–95	Ilves	Liiga	42	13	6	19	47	—	—	—	—	—
1995–96	Ilves	Liiga	7	1	0	1	0	—	—	—	—	—
1995–96	Tappara	Liiga	15	2	0	2	4	—	—	—	—	—
1996–97	EC Peiting	DEU II	—	—	—	—	—	—	—	—	—	—
1997–98	TuS Geretsried	DEU III	38	16	27	43	41	—	—	—	—	—
Liiga totals			441	123	110	233	222	65	12	13	25	36

=== International ===
Year	Team	Event	GP	G	A	Pts	PIM
1982	Finland	EJC	—	—	—	—	—
1984	Finland	WJC	7	3	1	4	0
1987	Finland	WC	5	1	0	1	6
1988	Finland	OG	8	4	1	5	10
1989	Finland	WC	9	1	1	2	2
1990	Finland	WC	8	1	0	1	2
Senior totals			30	7	2	9	20
