= Wemasto Areena =

Ice sports arena in Lahti, Finland

- Lahden jäähalli
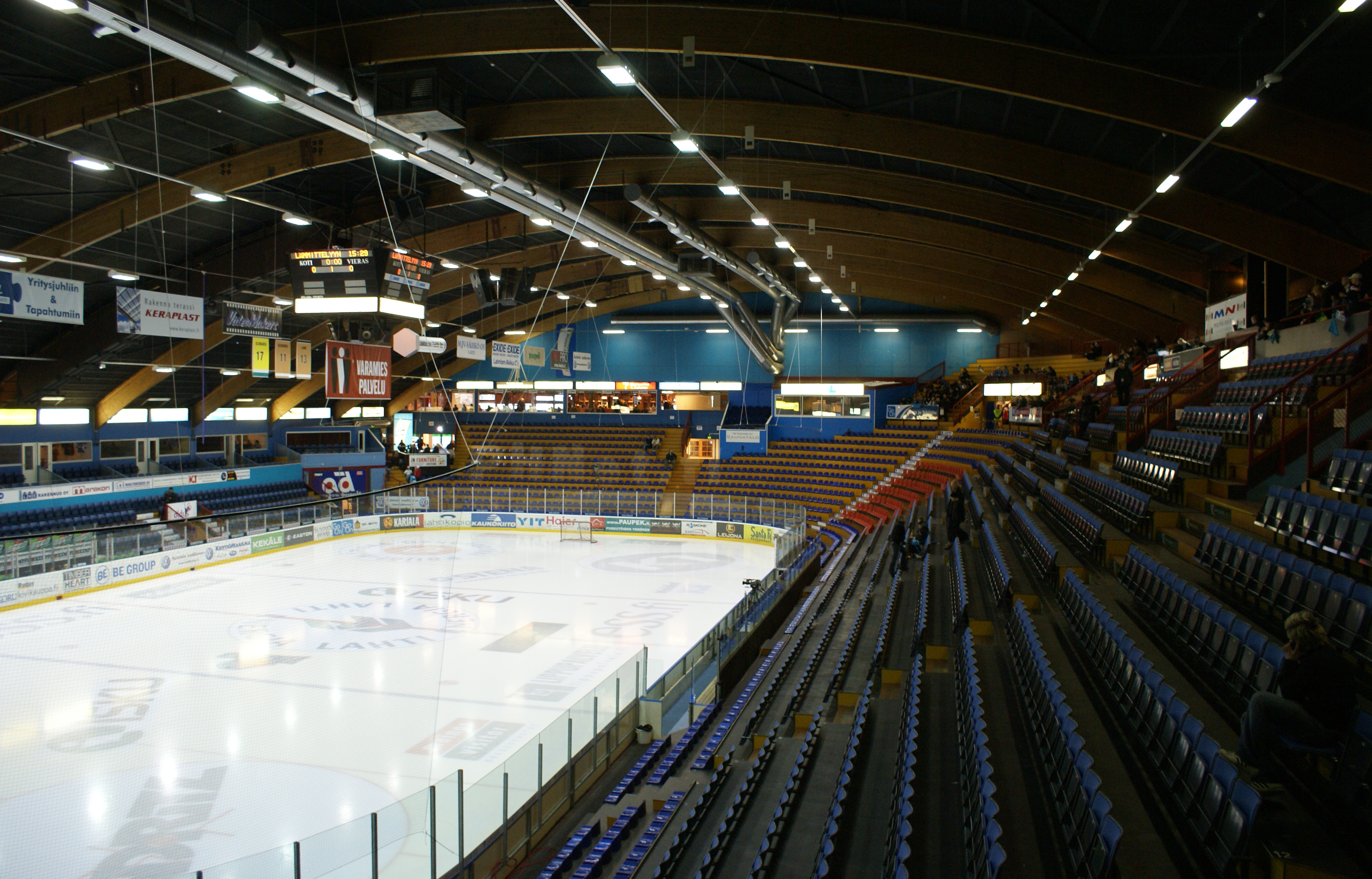
- Interactive map of Wemasto Areena
- Former names: Isku Areena (2005–2025)
- Address: Svinhufvudinkatu 29; Lahti, Finland
- Location: Lahden urheilukeskus
- Coordinates: 60°58′54″N 25°38′20″E
- Operator: Lahden Jäähalli Oy
- Capacity: 4,403
- Executive suites: 16
- Public transit: Urheilukeskus bus stop

Construction
- Opened: 1973
- Renovated: 2007, 2010, 2022

Tenants
- Lahden Pelicans; Lahti Ringette

Lahden jäähalli ('Lahti's ice hall'), also known as Wemasto Areena for sponsorship reasons, is an indoor ice sports arena in Lahti, Finland. It is primarily used for ice hockey and is the home arena of Lahden Pelicans who play in the Liiga.

The arena is part of the Lahden urheilukeskus ('Lahti Sports Center'), a concentrated area of sports venues highlighted by Lahti Stadium, the Salpausselä ski jumps, and Wemasto Areena.

Wemasto Areena has a total capacity of 4,403 people and features sixteen suites and a 200-seat restaurant with a view of the rink, called Ravintola Lämäri.

== History ==
The arena first opened its doors in 1973, at which time it was simply known as Lahden jäähalli ('Lahti's ice hall').

In 2005, a ten-year sponsorship agreement was signed between the Pelicans, the arena ownership group (Lahden Jäähalli Oy), and Lahti-based furniture company Isku. The venue was dubbed Isku Areena, becoming the fourth SM-liiga arena to gain sponsorship.

A renovation in the summer of 2007 reduced the venue's capacity from 5,098 to 4,910. In the summer of 2009, a media cube was added to the hall.

In the spring of 2010, a new hall renovation was carried out, with which Isku Areena got about 500-600 new spectator seats and six suites. In addition, changes were also made to the ice rink externally, and among other things, the players' changing rooms were renovated and a new lobby was built in the hall.

In the fall of 2017, a statue of Erkki Laine was unveiled next to the arena. It was the first outdoor sculpture of a specific ice hockey player to be erected in Finland and was modeled in the tradition of some NHL teams, notably the Montreal Canadiens and Toronto Maple Leafs, which feature similar statues outside of their home arenas.

In the spring of 2022, the D2 grandstand turned into a standing grandstand that can hold more than 1,000 people, where Pelicans supporters will also be positioned. The former Fanikatsomo was transformed into seats offering excellent visibility, and the away fans' stand will move to the corner of the A5 upper stand.

In September 2025, the Lahden Pelicans signed an arena sponsorship agreement with Wemasto, an engineering company based in Orimattila, and the venue was renamed Wemasto Areena.

The preliminary plan for a major renovation and expansion of the venue was announced by Lahden Jäähalli Oy in April 2025. The stated intent was to develop the building into a multi-purpose arena with an audience capacity of over 7,000 people. Initial project costs were estimated at approximately 45 million euros.

== Tenants ==
Wemasto Areena has served as the home venue of Lahden Pelicans since 1973 and it is in that capacity that it is best known.

It is also home of the Pelicans' team in the Naisten Mestis and junior ice hockey teams in the U20 SM-sarja and U18 SM-sarja.

The arena is used for ringette in addition to ice hockey and serves as home ice to Lahti Ringette of the SM Ringette.

== Retired jerseys ==
The following numbers have been retired by the Pelicans and hang from the rafters:

11 Hannu Koskinen
13 Erkki Laine
17 Kari Eloranta

== Events ==
Several major international sporting events have been partially or entirely hosted at Wemasto Areena:

- 2001 IIHF World U18 Championships
- 2013 World Aesthetic Group Gymnastics Championships
- 2025 World Ringette Championships

== See also ==
- List of indoor arenas in Finland
- List of indoor arenas in Nordic countries
