= Iiro Järvi =

Finnish ice hockey player

- Born: March 23, 1965 (age 60) Helsinki, FIN
- Height: 6 ft 2 in (188 cm)
- Weight: 201 lb (91 kg; 14 st 5 lb)
- Position: Right wing
- Shot: Left
- Played for: HIFK; Kiekkoreipas; Quebec Nordiques; Halifax Citadels; Klagenfurter AC; Frankfurt Lions; SaiPa; Newcastle Riverkings
- National team: Finland
- NHL draft: 54th overall, 1983; Quebec Nordiques
- Playing career: 1983–2000

Medal record

Men's ice hockey

Representing Finland

Olympic Games
Silver medal – second place	1988 Calgary	Ice hockey

World Junior Championships
Silver medal – second place	1984 Sweden	Ice hockey

IIHF European Junior Championships
Silver medal – second place	1983 Norway	Ice hockey

Iiro Petteri Järvi (born 23 March 1965 in Helsinki, Finland) is a retired professional ice hockey player who played in the National Hockey League and SM-Liiga. He played for HIFK, SaiPa, and Quebec Nordiques.

== Career statistics ==
=== Regular season and playoffs ===
			Regular season					Playoffs
Season	Team	League	GP	G	A	Pts	PIM	GP	G	A	Pts	PIM
1983–84	HIFK	Liiga	27	0	6	6	6	—	—	—	—	—
1984–85	HIFK	Liiga	9	0	1	1	2	—	—	—	—	—
1984–85	Kiekkoreipas	Liiga	15	2	3	5	10	—	—	—	—	—
1985–86	HIFK	Liiga	29	7	6	13	19	10	4	6	10	0
1986–87	HIFK	Liiga	43	23	30	53	82	5	1	5	6	9
1987–88	HIFK	Liiga	44	21	20	41	68	5	2	1	3	7
1988–89	Quebec Nordiques	NHL	75	11	30	41	40	—	—	—	—	—
1989–90	Quebec Nordiques	NHL	41	7	13	20	18	—	—	—	—	—
1989–90	Halifax Citadels	AHL	26	4	13	17	4	—	—	—	—	—
1990–91	Halifax Citadels	AHL	5	0	2	2	2	—	—	—	—	—
1990–91	Klagenfurter AC	AUT	26	12	21	33	86	—	—	—	—	—
1991–92	HIFK	Liiga	43	14	23	37	64	9	3	4	7	2
1992–93	HIFK	Liiga	47	7	23	30	64	4	3	3	6	14
1993–94	HIFK	Liiga	47	13	24	37	113	3	0	2	2	4
1994–95	HIFK	Liiga	50	14	29	43	50	3	0	0	0	2
1995–96	HIFK	Liiga	50	13	30	43	88	3	0	2	2	0
1996–97	Frankfurt Lions	DEL	48	13	23	36	44	9	2	8	10	14
1997–98	Klagenfurter AC	AUT	49	13	27	40	46	—	—	—	—	—
1998–99	SaiPa	Liiga	32	3	9	12	26	7	0	2	2	33
1999–2000	Newcastle Riverkings	BISL	41	14	28	42	51	8	2	2	4	4
Liiga totals			436	117	204	321	592	49	13	25	38	71
NHL totals			116	18	43	61	58	—	—	—	—	—

=== International ===
Year	Team	Event	GP	G	A	Pts	PIM
1983	Finland	EJC	5	3	1	4	22
1983	Finland	WJC	7	3	1	4	2
1984	Finland	WJC	7	4	3	7	4
1985	Finland	WJC	7	1	1	2	2
1987	Finland	CC	4	0	0	0	2
1987	Finland	WC	8	2	0	2	10
1988	Finland	OG	8	2	5	7	10
1989	Finland	WC	9	0	2	2	10
1991	Finland	CC	6	0	0	0	6
Junior totals			26	11	6	17	30
Senior totals			35	4	7	11	38
