= Ice hockey at the 1988 Winter Olympics =

1988 Winter Olympics Ice Hockey
Tournament details
- Host country: Canada
- Venue(s): Olympic Saddledome; Stampede Corral; Father David Bauer Olympic Arena (in 1 host city)
- Dates: February 13–28, 1988
- Teams: 12

Final positions
- Champions: Soviet Union (7th title)
- Runners-up: Finland
- Third place: Sweden
- Fourth place: Canada

Tournament statistics
- Games played: 42
- Goals scored: 316 (7.52 per game)
- Scoring leader: (Soviet Union) Vladimir Krutov (15 points)

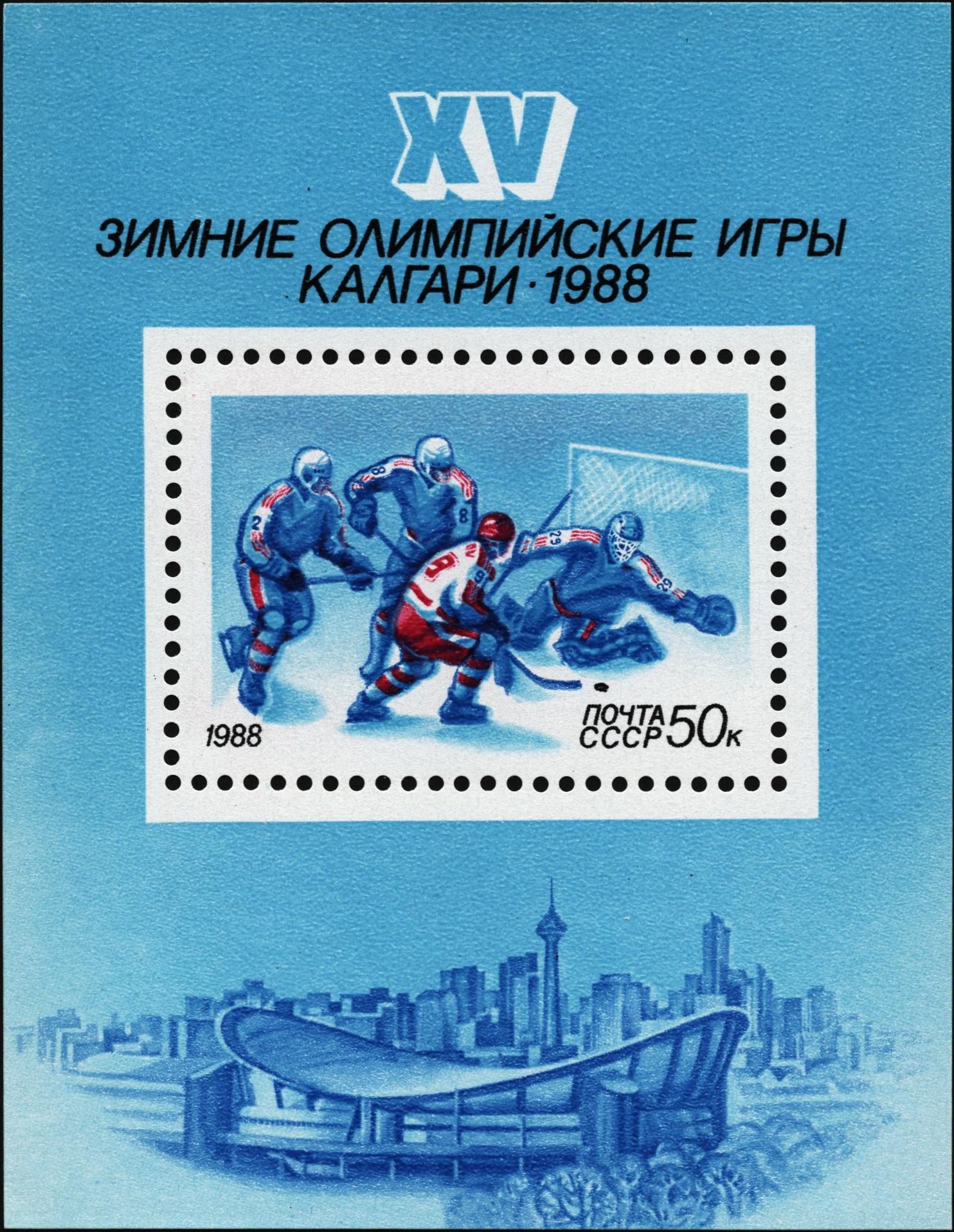
Soviet stamp for the Olympic ice hockey tournament

The men's ice hockey tournament at the 1988 Winter Olympics in Calgary, Alberta, Canada, was the 16th Olympic Championship. The Soviet Union won its seventh gold medal. The silver medal was won by Finland, marking its first ever Olympic ice hockey medal. Sweden won the bronze medal. Games were held in the Olympic Saddledome, the Stampede Corral, and Father David Bauer Olympic Arena. This is so far the only Olympic tournament held on North American soil that was not won by either Canada or United States.

The IIHF did not run a championship in Olympic years at this time. Nations that did not participate in the Calgary Olympics were invited to compete in the final Thayer Tutt Trophy.

== Background ==
The Canadian team had defeated the favoured Soviets twice in the run-up to the Olympics and was considered a gold medal contender for the first time since 1968. The first win over the Soviet squad was particularly significant as it happened in the annual Izvestia tournament which was held in 1987 in Moscow and was considered a final shot before the Olympics. Unfortunately for the Canadians, these victories backfired as the Soviets prepared better for the Olympic tournament and won in a head-to-head match 5–0.

=== Tournament changes ===
As this was the first time in history that the Winter Olympic Games had been played in an NHL market, Calgary Organizing Committee (OCO'88) sought to revamp the ice hockey tournament for the Games, one that would include more games played between better-placed teams. In previous Olympic tournaments the top four teams advanced from the first round robin stage. Calgary Games organizers wanted to increase that number to six, which had the effect of increasing the total number of ice hockey games in the Olympics from 36 to 42. The International Olympic Committee (IOC) convinced the IIHF to accept this new competition format, allowing OCO'88 to set up the tournament tables after the draw, allocating the main games for each round at the Olympic Saddledome, which resulted in greater interest in selling tickets there. But, even so, the IIHF remained reluctant to increase the number of games, noting it would extend the break for European leagues with players participating. Eventually, OCO'88, the IIHF, and the IOC agreed to the increased number of games with some changes to financial payments to the IIHF.

=== Doping ===
Polish ice-hockey player Jarosław Morawiecki tested positive for the banned substance Testosterone during the Games. The 23 year old centre, who was considered Poland's best player, exceeded the allowable limit of testosterone in random testing after a match which saw Poland defeat France 6–2. Polish coach Leszek Lejczyk claimed Morawiecki was deliberately drugged for political reasons.

The International Ice Hockey Federation (IIHF) banned Morawiecki from competition for 18 months and invalidated Poland's victory in the France match. Poland finished 5th of 6th in the tournament Group A standings.

== Medalists ==
Medal	Country	Team
Gold	Soviet Union	Ilya Byakin; Vyacheslav Bykov; Alexander Chernykh; Viacheslav Fetisov; Alexei Gusarov; Valeri Kamensky; Alexei Kasatonov; Andrei Khomutov; Vladimir Krutov; Igor Larionov; Aleksandr Kozhevnikov; Igor Kravchuk; Andrei Lomakin; Sergei Makarov; Alexander Mogilny; Sergei Mylnikov; Vitali Samoilov; Anatoly Semenov; Sergei Starikov; Igor Stelnov; Sergei Svetlov; Sergei Yashin; Yevgeni Belosheikin
Silver	Finland	Timo Blomqvist; Kari Eloranta; Raimo Helminen; Iiro Järvi; Esa Keskinen; Erkki Laine; Kari Laitinen; Erkki Lehtonen; Jyrki Lumme; Reijo Mikkolainen; Jarmo Myllys; Teppo Numminen; Janne Ojanen; Arto Ruotanen; Reijo Ruotsalainen; Simo Saarinen; Kai Suikkanen; Timo Susi; Jukka Tammi; Jari Torkki; Pekka Tuomisto; Jukka Virtanen
Bronze	Sweden	Mikael Andersson; Peter Åslin; Peter Andersson; Bo Berglund; Jonas Bergqvist; Thom Eklund; Anders Eldebrink; Peter Eriksson; Thomas Eriksson; Michael Hjälm; Lars Ivarsson; Mikael Johansson; Lars Karlsson; Mats Kihlström; Peter Lindmark; Lars Molin; Jens Öhling; Lars-Gunnar Pettersson; Thomas Rundqvist; Tommy Samuelsson; Ulf Sandström; Håkan Södergren

== Qualification ==
The top eleven nations from the 1987 World Championships (eight from pool A, top three from pool B) qualified directly, while the twelfth ranked nation had to play off against the winner of that year's pool C. France beat Japan 8 goals to 6.

- April 6, 1987, West Germany
  - France 7–3 Japan
- April 7, 1987, West Germany
  - France 1–3 Japan

== First round ==
=== Group A ===
Team	Pld	W	L	D	GF	GA	GD	Pts
Finland	5	3	1	1	22	8	+14	7
Sweden	5	2	0	3	23	10	+13	7
Canada	5	3	1	1	17	12	+5	7
Switzerland	5	3	2	0	19	10	+9	6
Poland	5	0	4	1	9	13	−4	1
France	5	1	4	0	10	47	−37	0

Source: HockeyCanada.ca

14 February 1988	Canada	1–0	Poland

14 February 1988	Sweden	13–2	France

14 February 1988	Switzerland	2–1	Finland

16 February 1988	Canada	4–2	Switzerland

16 February 1988	Sweden	1–1	Poland

16 February 1988	Finland	10–1	France

18 February 1988	Finland	3–1	Canada

18 February 1988	Poland	0–2*	France

18 February 1988	Sweden	4–2	Switzerland

20 February 1988	Canada	9–5	France

20 February 1988	Finland	3–3	Sweden

20 February 1988	Switzerland	4–1	Poland

22 February 1988	Canada	2–2	Sweden

22 February 1988	Finland	5–1	Poland

22 February 1988	Switzerland	9–0	France

* The Polish team was stripped of its victory after Jarosław Morawiecki tested positive for testosterone. France was recorded as having a 2-0 win, but received no points in the standings. The match originally ended 6-2.

=== Group B ===
Team	Pld	W	L	D	GF	GA	GD	Pts
Soviet Union	5	5	0	0	32	10	+22	10
West Germany	5	4	1	0	19	12	+7	8
Czechoslovakia	5	3	2	0	23	14	+9	6
United States	5	2	3	0	27	27	0	4
Austria	5	0	4	1	12	29	−17	1
Norway	5	0	4	1	11	32	−21	1

Source: HockeyCanada.ca

13 February 1988	West Germany	2–1	Czechoslovakia

13 February 1988	Soviet Union	5–1	Norway

13 February 1988	United States	10–6	Austria

15 February 1988	West Germany	7–3	Norway

15 February 1988	Soviet Union	8–1	Austria

15 February 1988	Czechoslovakia	7–5	United States

17 February 1988	Austria	1–3	West Germany

17 February 1988	Czechoslovakia	10–1	Norway

17 February 1988	Soviet Union	7–5	United States

19 February 1988	Austria	0–4	Czechoslovakia

19 February 1988	West Germany	3–6	Soviet Union

19 February 1988	United States	6–3	Norway

21 February 1988	Soviet Union	6–1	Czechoslovakia

21 February 1988	Austria	4–4	Norway

21 February 1988	West Germany	4–1	United States

== Final round ==
The top three teams from each group play the top three teams from the other group once. Points from previous games against their own group carry over, excluding teams who failed to make the medal round. First place team wins gold, second silver and third bronze.

Team	Pld	W	L	D	GF	GA	GD	Pts
Soviet Union	5	4	1	0	25	7	+18	8
Finland	5	3	1	1	18	10	+8	7
Sweden	5	2	1	2	15	16	−1	6
Canada	5	2	2	1	17	14	+3	5
West Germany	5	1	4	0	8	26	−18	2
Czechoslovakia	5	1	4	0	12	22	−10	2

Source: HockeyCanada.ca

24 February 1988	Soviet Union	5–0	Canada

24 February 1988	Sweden	6–2	Czechoslovakia

24 February 1988	Finland	8–0	West Germany

26 February 1988	Canada	8–1	West Germany

26 February 1988	Czechoslovakia	5–2	Finland

26 February 1988	Soviet Union	7–1	Sweden

27 February 1988	Canada	6–3	Czechoslovakia

28 February 1988	Sweden	3–2	West Germany

28 February 1988	Finland	2–1	Soviet Union

11th place game

23 February 1988	France	7–6 SO	Norway

9th place game

23 February 1988	Austria	3–2	Poland

7th place game

25 February 1988	United States	8–4	Switzerland

== Statistics ==
=== Average age ===
Team Germany was the oldest team in the tournament, averaging 28 years and 1 months. Team USA was the youngest team in the tournament, averaging 22 years and 4 months. Gold medalists Team USSR averaged 26 years. Tournament average was 26 years and 1 months.

=== Leading scorers ===
Rk	Player	GP	G	A	Pts	PIM
1	(Soviet Union) Vladimir Krutov	8	6	9	15	0
2	(Soviet Union) Igor Larionov	8	4	9	13	4
3	(Soviet Union) Vyacheslav Fetisov	8	4	9	13	6
4	(United States) Corey Millen	8	6	5	11	4
5	(Czechoslovakia) Dusan Pasek	8	6	5	11	8
6	(Soviet Union) Sergei Makarov	8	3	8	11	10
7	(Finland) Erkki Lehtonen	8	4	6	10	2
8	(Sweden) Anders Eldebrink	8	4	6	10	4
9	(Czech Republic) Igor Liba	8	4	6	10	8
10	(West Germany) Gerd Truntschka	8	3	7	10	10

== Final ranking ==
Rank	Team
1st place, gold medalist(s)	Soviet Union
2nd place, silver medalist(s)	Finland
3rd place, bronze medalist(s)	Sweden
4	Canada
5	West Germany
6	Czechoslovakia
7	United States
8	Switzerland
9	Austria
10	Poland
11	France
12	Norway

== See also ==
- Calgary Cup
