= Kai Suikkanen =

Finnish ice hockey player and coach

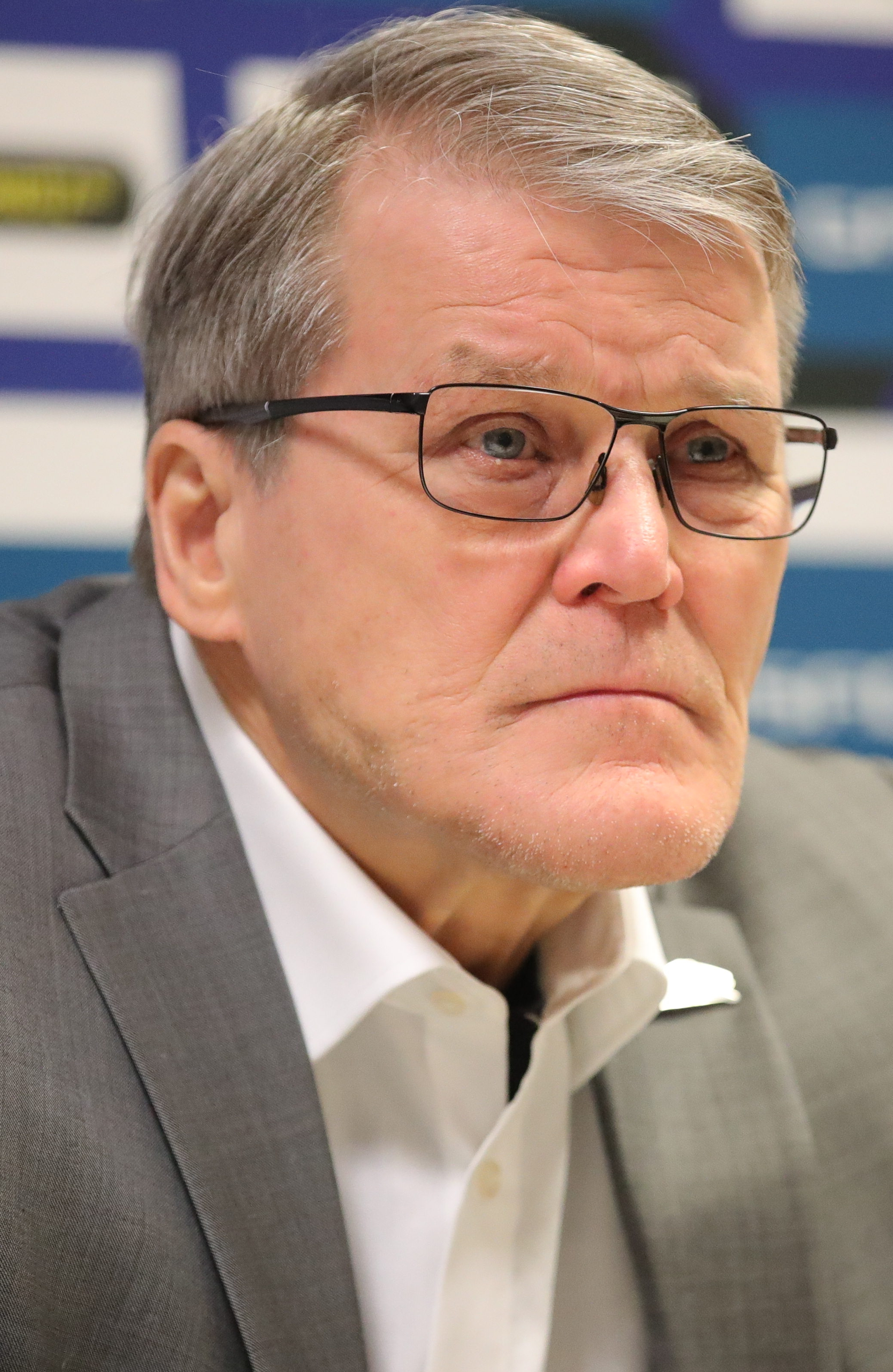
- Suikkanen in 2023
- Born: June 29, 1959 (age 67) Parkano, FIN
- Height: 6 ft 2 in (188 cm)
- Weight: 205 lb (93 kg; 14 st 9 lb)
- Position: Right wing
- Shot: Left
- Played for: Kärpät; Buffalo Sabres; TPS
- National team: Finland
- NHL draft: Undrafted
- Playing career: 1977–1991

Medal record

Men's ice hockey

Representing Finland

Olympic Games
Silver medal – second place	1988 Calgary	Team

Kai Petri Suikkanen (born June 29, 1959) is a retired Finnish professional ice hockey left wing. Currently, he works as the head coach of KooKoo of the Finnish hockey league Liiga; he was hired on October 7, 2026.

== Playing career ==
- Suikkanen played in two games in the National Hockey League with the Buffalo Sabres, and spent most of his career in Finland's SM-liiga with Kärpät and TPS Turku.
- Two times Kanada-malja champion: 1980–81, 1990–91
- Calder Cup champion, season 1982-83.

== Coaching career ==
- Suikkanen Head coached Kajaanin Hokki as the champion of the Mestis (Second-highest league in Finland), during the season 2006–07.
- Suikkanen Head coached TPS as the champion of the SM-Liiga (top league in Finland), during the season 2009–10.
- Suikkanen worked as the head coach of Lokomotiv Yaroslavl during the 2010–11 KHL season.
- Suikkanen Head coached HC Bozen-Bolzano as the champion of the Austrian Hockey League (EBEL league), during the season 2017–18.

== International ==
Suikkanen won a silver medal at the 1988 Winter Olympics in Calgary as a member of the Finland men's national ice hockey team.

== Career statistics ==
=== Regular season and playoffs ===
			Regular season					Playoffs
Season	Team	League	GP	G	A	Pts	PIM	GP	G	A	Pts	PIM
1975–76	Kärpät	FIN Jr.	34	28	7	35	46	—	—	—	—	—
1976–77	Kärpät	FIN Jr.	9	7	4	11	15	—	—	—	—	—
1976–77	Kärpät	FIN II	16	15	4	19	16	6	4	1	5	6
1977–78	Kärpät	SM-l	35	21	6	27	19	—	—	—	—	—
1978–79	Kärpät	SM-l	36	16	6	22	65	—	—	—	—	—
1979–80	Kärpät	SM-l	36	21	17	38	18	6	0	3	3	6
1980–81	Kärpät	SM-l	33	20	11	31	60	11	5	2	7	32
1981–82	Buffalo Sabres	NHL	1	0	0	0	0	—	—	—	—	—
1981–82	Rochester Americans	AHL	71	34	33	67	32	9	4	2	6	4
1982–83	Buffalo Sabres	NHL	1	0	0	0	0	—	—	—	—	—
1982–83	Rochester Americans	AHL	66	33	44	77	65	16	7	7	14	21
1983–84	Rochester Americans	AHL	15	7	10	17	2	—	—	—	—	—
1983–84	Kärpät	SM-l	23	9	4	13	20	10	6	4	10	8
1984–85	Kärpät	SM-l	22	8	6	14	47	7	2	3	5	4
1985–86	Kärpät	SM-l	33	26	10	36	24	4	0	0	0	24
1986–87	Kärpät	SM-l	44	24	25	49	30	9	7	1	8	6
1987–88	Kärpät	SM-l	26	17	14	31	25	—	—	—	—	—
1988–89	Kärpät	SM-l	33	13	10	23	16	—	—	—	—	—
1989–90	Kärpät	FIN II	35	17	24	41	31	—	—	—	—	—
1990–91	TPS	SM-l	41	4	3	7	6	9	1	1	2	2
SM-l totals			362	179	112	291	330	56	21	14	35	82
AHL totals			152	74	87	161	99	25	11	9	20	25

=== International ===
Year	Team	Event	GP	G	A	Pts	PIM
1978	Finland	WJC	6	5	2	7	9
1979	Finland	WJC	6	1	2	3	0
1986	Finland	WC	10	0	3	3	4
1988	Finland	OG	8	1	0	1	4
Junior totals			12	6	4	10	9
Senior totals			18	1	3	4	8
