= Alexander Chernykh =

Soviet ice hockey player (born 1965)

- Born: 12 September 1965 (age 60) Voskresensk, Russian SFSR, Soviet Union
- Height: 6 ft 0 in (183 cm)
- Weight: 181 lb (82 kg; 12 st 13 lb)
- Position: Centre
- Played for: Soviet League; Khimik Voskresensk; HC CSKA Moscow
- National team: Soviet Union
- NHL draft: 185th overall, 1983; New Jersey Devils
- Playing career: 1982–1989

Alexander Aleksandrovich Chernykh (Russian: Александр Александрович Чёрных; born 12 September 1965) is a retired Soviet ice hockey player. He won a gold medal at the 1988 Winter Olympics. He played for HC CSKA Moscow. He was inducted into the Russian and Soviet Hockey Hall of Fame in 1988.

== Career statistics ==
=== Regular season and playoffs ===
			Regular season
Season	Team	League	GP	G	A	Pts	PIM
1981–82	Khimik Voskresensk	USSR	—	—	—	—	—
1982–83	Khimik Voskresensk	USSR	46	12	5	17	26
1983–84	Khimik Voskresensk	USSR	44	12	5	17	32
1984–85	Khimik Voskresensk	USSR	48	9	10	19	32
1985–86	CSKA Moscow	USSR	10	3	3	6	6
1985–86	SKA MVO Kalinin	USSR II	34	29	16	45	59
1986–87	SKA MVO Kalinin	USSR II	57	32	30	62	52
1987–88	Khimik Voskresensk	USSR	41	14	15	29	34
1988–89	Khimik Voskresensk	USSR	41	9	12	21	32
USSR totals			230	59	50	109	162
USSR II totals			91	61	46	107	111

=== International ===
Alexander Chernykh
Medal record

Representing Soviet Union

Ice hockey

World Championships
Gold medal – first place	1989 Sweden	

Olympic Games
Gold medal – first place	1988 Calgary	

World Junior Ice Hockey Championships
Gold medal – first place	1983 Soviet Union	
Gold medal – first place	1984 Sweden	
Bronze medal – third place	1985 Finland	

Year	Team	Event	GP	G	A	Pts	PIM
1982	Soviet Union	EJC	5	0	3	3	0
1983	Soviet Union	EJC	4	3	9	12	23
1983	Soviet Union	WJC	7	1	0	1	0
1984	Soviet Union	WJC	7	7	7	14	12
1985	Soviet Union	WJC	7	6	2	8	10
1988	Soviet Union	OG	8	2	2	4	4
1989	Soviet Union	WC	7	0	1	1	8
Junior totals			30	17	21	38	45
Senior totals			15	2	3	5	12
