= Jouko Parviainen =

Finnish Nordic combined skier

Jouko Antero Parviainen (born 4 March 1958 in Kuopio) was a Finnish Nordic combined skier who competed from 1985 to 1988. He finished seventh in the 3 x 10 km team event at the 1988 Winter Olympics in Calgary.

Parviainen's best career finish was fourth in a 15 km individual World Cup event in Canada in 1986.
