= Pasi Saapunki =

Finnish Nordic combined skier

Pasi Saapunki (born 24 February 1968) was a Finnish Nordic combined skier who competed from 1988 to 1992. At the 1988 Winter Olympics in Calgary, he finished seventh in the 3 x 10 km team and 15th in the 15 km individual events. Saapunki also finished seventh in the 3 x 10 km team event at the 1992 Winter Olympics in Albertville.

Sappunki also competed in the 3 x 10 team event at the 1991 FIS Nordic World Ski Championships in Val di Fiemme. His best World Cup finish was eighth in a 15 km individual event in Finland in 1990.
