= Vitālijs Samoilovs =

Latvian ice hockey player

- Born: 17 April 1962 (age 64) Riga, Latvian SSR, Soviet Union
- Position: Goalie
- Played for: Dinamo Riga; Latvijas Berzs; Sokil Kyiv; Latvijas Zelts Riga; Alianse Riga
- National team: Soviet Union
- Playing career: 1982–1991
Medal record
Ice hockey
Gold medal – first place	1988 Calgary	Men
World Championships
Silver medal – second place	1987 Austria	Ice hockey
European Junior Championships
Gold medal – first place	1980 Czechoslovakia	Ice hockey

Vitālijs Samoilovs (Russian: Виталий Анатольевич Самойлов; born 17 April 1962) is a former Latvian professional ice hockey player who played in the Soviet Championship League. He played for Dynamo Riga and Sokil Kyiv.

The best season of his career was 1987-88, in which he made the Soviet National Team, but as a back-up goaltender, he never actually played in a national team game. He was the third-string goaltender at the 1987 Canada Cup and didn't appear in any games. He was selected for the gold-medal-winning Soviet team at the 1988 Winter Olympics but was Sergei Mylnikov back-up. Also, he was Yevgeni Belosheikin back-up at the 1987 Ice Hockey World Championships where he won a silver medal. Lastly, that season, he led Dinamo Riga to a surprising third-place finish in the Championship League.

The following year an injury caused him to lose his starting job in Riga to Arturs Irbe.
