= Ilya Byakin =

Russian ice hockey player (born 1963)

- Born: February 2, 1963 (age 62); Sverdlovsk, URS
- Height: 5 ft 10 in (178 cm)
- Weight: 182 lb (83 kg; 13 st 0 lb)
- Position: Defence
- Shot: Left
- Played for: Edmonton Oilers; San Jose Sharks; Spartak Moscow; Avtomobilist Yekaterinburg; CSKA Moscow; Lada Togliatti; Avangard Omsk
- National team: Soviet Union and Russia
- NHL draft: 267th overall, 1993; Edmonton Oilers
- Playing career: 1982–2004

Ilya Vladimirovich Byakin (Russian: Илъя Владимирович Бякин; born February 2, 1963, in Sverdlovsk, Soviet Union) is a retired ice hockey player who played in the Soviet Hockey League and National Hockey League. He played for HC Spartak Moscow, Avangard Omsk, Edmonton Oilers, and San Jose Sharks. He was inducted into the Russian and Soviet Hockey Hall of Fame in 1988.

== Career statistics ==
=== Regular season and playoffs ===
			Regular season					Playoffs
Season	Team	League	GP	G	A	Pts	PIM	GP	G	A	Pts	PIM
1979–80	Kolos Kargapolye	URS.4	2	1	0	1	4	—	—	—	—	—
1980–81	Avtomobilist Sverdlovsk	URS.2	45	4	2	6	16	—	—	—	—	—
1981–82	Avtomobilist Sverdlovsk	URS.2	54	11	16	27	99	—	—	—	—	—
1982–83	Avtomobilist Sverdlovsk	URS.2	53	12	—	—	—	—	—	—	—	—
1983–84	Spartak Moscow	URS	44	9	12	21	26	—	—	—	—	—
1984–85	Spartak Moscow	URS	46	7	11	18	56	—	—	—	—	—
1985–86	Spartak Moscow	URS	34	8	7	15	41	—	—	—	—	—
1986–87	Avtomobilist Sverdlovsk	URS	—	—	—	—	—	—	—	—	—	—
1987–88	Avtomobilist Sverdlovsk	URS	30	10	10	20	37	—	—	—	—	—
1988–89	Avtomobilist Sverdlovsk	URS	40	11	9	20	53	—	—	—	—	—
1989–90	Avtomobilist Sverdlovsk	URS	27	14	5	19	20	—	—	—	—	—
1990–91	CSKA Moscow	URS	29	4	7	11	20	—	—	—	—	—
1991–92	SC Rapperswil–Jona	SUI.2	36	27	42	69	36	—	—	—	—	—
1992–93	EV Landshut	1.GBun	44	12	19	31	43	6	5	6	11	6
1993–94	Edmonton Oilers	NHL	44	8	20	28	28	—	—	—	—	—
1993–94	Cape Breton Oilers	AHL	12	2	9	11	8	—	—	—	—	—
1994–95	Avtomobilist Yekaterinburg	IHL	4	3	2	5	14	—	—	—	—	—
1994–95	San Jose Sharks	NHL	13	0	5	5	14	—	—	—	—	—
1994–95	Kansas City Blades	IHL	1	0	2	2	0	16	4	10	14	43
1995–96	Malmö IF	SEL	36	10	15	25	52	3	1	0	1	34
1996–97	MIF Redhawks	SEL	47	11	14	25	78	4	0	1	1	0
1997–98	Las Vegas Thunder	IHL	52	3	7	10	40	—	—	—	—	—
1997–98	San Antonio Dragons	IHL	6	0	1	1	10	—	—	—	—	—
1998–99	Spartak Moscow	RSL	21	3	6	9	24	—	—	—	—	—
1999–2000	Lada Togliatti	RSL	37	9	13	22	83	7	0	2	2	18
2000–01	Lada Togliatti	RSL	35	1	3	4	54	5	0	0	0	6
2001–02	CSKA Moscow	RSL	20	1	9	10	12	—	—	—	—	—
2002–03	CSKA Moscow	RSL	27	1	6	7	16	—	—	—	—	—
2002–03	Avangard Omsk	RSL	15	0	1	1	12	1	0	0	0	0
2003–04	Junost Minsk	BLR	27	8	14	22	34	10	2	2	4	8
USSR totals			250	63	61	124	253	—	—	—	—	—
NHL totals			57	8	25	33	44	—	—	—	—	—
RSL totals			155	15	38	53	201	13	0	2	2	24

=== International ===
Year	Team	Event	Place	GP	G	A	Pts	PIM
1981	Soviet Union	EJC	1st place, gold medalist(s)	5	1	0	1	8
1982	Soviet Union	WJC	4th	7	0	4	4	10
1983	Soviet Union	WJC	1st place, gold medalist(s)	7	1	5	6	6
1988	Soviet Union	OG	1st place, gold medalist(s)	8	1	4	5	4
1989	Soviet Union	WC	1st place, gold medalist(s)	9	0	2	2	4
1990	Soviet Union	WC	1st place, gold medalist(s)	10	0	3	3	8
1991	Soviet Union	WC	3rd place, bronze medalist(s)	10	2	1	3	4
1992	Russia	WC	5th	6	3	1	4	2
1993	Russia	WC	1st place, gold medalist(s)	8	3	4	7	6
1994	Russia	WC	5th	6	2	3	5	2
Junior totals				19	2	9	11	24
Senior totals				57	11	18	29	30
