= Erkki Lehtonen =

Finnish ice hockey player

- Born: January 9, 1957 (age 68) Tampere, Finland
- Height: 5 ft 10 in (178 cm)
- Weight: 176 lb (80 kg; 12 st 8 lb)
- Position: Center
- Shot: Left
- Played for: Tappara
- National team: Finland
- NHL draft: Undrafted
- Playing career: 1977–1991

Erkki Tapani Lehtonen (born January 9, 1957, in Tampere, Finland) is a retired professional ice hockey player who played for Tappara in the SM-liiga. He was inducted into the Finnish Hockey Hall of Fame in 1997 and his jersey was retired by Tappara in 2018. He also won a silver medal at the 1988 Winter Olympics. Lehtonen scored the winning goal to help Finland win their first medal.

== Career statistics ==
=== Regular season and playoffs ===
			Regular season					Playoffs
Season	Team	League	GP	G	A	Pts	PIM	GP	G	A	Pts	PIM
1974–75	Tappara	FIN Jr.	15	10	10	20	6	—	—	—	—	—
1975–76	Tappara	FIN Jr.	26	25	18	43	6	—	—	—	—	—
1976–77	Bellingham Blazers	BCHL	68	32	85	117	13	—	—	—	—	—
1977–78	Tappara	Liiga	36	8	7	15	10	7	2	2	4	7
1978–79	Tappara	Liiga	34	8	10	18	17	10	2	0	2	2
1979–80	Tappara	Liiga	36	17	26	43	22	—	—	—	—	—
1980–81	Tappara	Liiga	36	13	28	41	22	8	2	5	7	0
1981–82	Tappara	Liiga	36	19	22	41	8	11	4	4	8	2
1982–83	Tappara	Liiga	36	17	18	35	0	8	5	4	9	2
1983–84	Tappara	Liiga	35	18	30	48	22	9	8	3	11	0
1984–85	Tappara	Liiga	36	17	31	48	6	—	—	—	—	—
1985–86	Tappara	Liiga	36	22	26	48	4	8	5	6	11	0
1986–87	Tappara	Liiga	37	18	28	46	12	—	—	—	—	—
1987–88	Tappara	Liiga	44	17	33	50	25	10	7	12	19	4
1988–89	Berlin Capitals	1.GBun	27	8	25	33	4	—	—	—	—	—
1989–90	Tappara	Liiga	44	18	40	58	10	7	1	6	7	0
1990–91	Tappara	Liiga	31	10	7	17	2	3	1	0	1	0
Liiga totals			477	206	302	508	160	81	37	42	79	17

=== International ===
Year	Team	Event	GP	G	A	Pts	PIM
1986	Finland	WC	10	3	4	7	2
1988	Finland	OG	8	4	6	10	2
Senior totals			18	7	10	17	4
