= Timo Blomqvist =

Finnish ice hockey player (born 1961)

- Born: January 23, 1961 (age 64); Helsinki, Finland
- Height: 6 ft 0 in (183 cm)
- Weight: 200 lb (91 kg; 14 st 4 lb)
- Position: Defence
- Shot: Right
- Played for: Washington Capitals; New Jersey Devils
- National team: Finland
- NHL draft: 89th overall, 1980; Washington Capitals
- Playing career: 1977–1998

Medal record

Men's ice hockey

Representing Finland

Olympic Games
Silver medal – second place	1988 Calgary	Ice hockey

World Junior Championships
Silver medal – second place	1980 Finland	Ice hockey
Silver medal – second place	1981 West Germany	Ice hockey

IIHF European Junior Championships
Gold medal – first place	1978 Finland	Ice hockey

Timo Pauli Blomqvist (born January 23, 1961) is a Finnish former ice hockey player. As a youth, he played in the 1973 Quebec International Pee-Wee Hockey Tournament with a minor ice hockey team from Espoo. Drafted in 1980 by the Washington Capitals, Blomqvist also played briefly for the New Jersey Devils before he returned to play hockey in Europe.

== Awards ==
- Won the Swedish Elitserien Champion (Le Mat Trophy) in 1991–92.
- Awarded the U18 EJC All-Star Team in 1978, 1979.

== Career statistics ==
=== Regular season and playoffs ===
			Regular season					Playoffs
Season	Team	League	GP	G	A	Pts	PIM	GP	G	A	Pts	PIM
1977–78	Jokerit	SM-l	22	1	0	1	2	—	—	—	—	—
1978–79	Jokerit	SM-l	36	4	2	6	35	—	—	—	—	—
1979–80	Jokerit	SM-l	32	3	1	4	52	—	—	—	—	—
1980–81	Kiekkoreipas	SM-l	30	6	7	13	14	—	—	—	—	—
1981–82	Washington Capitals	NHL	44	1	11	12	62	—	—	—	—	—
1981–82	Hershey Bears	AHL	13	0	8	8	14	—	—	—	—	—
1982–83	Washington Capitals	NHL	61	1	17	18	67	3	0	0	0	16
1982–83	Hershey Bears	AHL	8	2	7	9	16	—	—	—	—	—
1983–84	Washington Capitals	NHL	65	1	19	20	84	8	0	0	0	8
1984–85	Washington Capitals	NHL	53	1	4	5	51	2	0	0	0	0
1985–86	Binghamton Whalers	AHL	71	6	18	24	76	—	—	—	—	—
1986–87	New Jersey Devils	NHL	20	0	2	2	29	—	—	—	—	—
1987–88	Modo Hockey	SEL	38	6	10	16	64	4	0	2	2	10
1988–89	Modo Hockey	SEL	39	4	8	12	92	—	—	—	—	—
1989–90	Modo Hockey	SEL	14	2	3	5	36	—	—	—	—	—
1989–90	Modo Hockey	Allsv	17	3	4	7	38	9	1	3	4	38
1990–91	Malmö IF	SEL	40	5	3	8	59	2	0	0	0	2
1991–92	Malmö IF	SEL	39	5	8	13	36	10	0	2	2	8
1992–93	Malmö IF	SEL	35	2	4	6	46	6	0	0	0	4
1993–94	Sparta Sarpsborg	NOR	30	3	12	15	63	2	0	0	0	6
1994–95	Kiekko-Espoo	SM-l	34	6	4	10	46	4	0	1	1	6
1995–96	Kiekko-Espoo	SM-l	48	4	4	8	68	—	—	—	—	—
1996–97	Wiener EV	AL	37	2	7	9	84	—	—	—	—	—
1997–98	ES Weißwasser	GER.2	15	0	5	5	43	—	—	—	—	—
1997–98	EPS	FIN.3	6	1	3	4	12	—	—	—	—	—
1997–98	Ahmat	FIN.2	18	0	3	3	24	—	—	—	—	—
SM-l totals			202	24	18	42	217	4	0	1	1	6
NHL totals			243	4	53	57	293	13	0	0	0	24
SEL totals			205	24	36	60	333	22	0	4	4	24

=== International ===
Year	Team	Event	GP	G	A	Pts	PIM
1978	Finland	EJC	4	0	2	2	6
1979	Finland	WJC	6	0	1	1	34
1979	Finland	EJC	5	4	0	4	13
1980	Finland	WJC	5	2	0	2	2
1981	Finland	WJC	5	1	3	4	10
1985	Finland	WC	9	0	3	3	6
1987	Finland	CC	4	0	0	0	0
1988	Finland	OG	8	1	1	2	10
1989	Finland	WC	10	0	1	1	8
1992	Finland	OG	8	0	1	1	8
Junior totals			25	7	6	13	65
Senior totals			39	1	6	7	32
