= Kari Eloranta =

Finnish ice hockey player

- Born: February 29, 1956 (age 69); Lahti, Finland
- Height: 6 ft 2 in (188 cm)
- Weight: 197 lb (89 kg; 14 st 1 lb)
- Position: Defence
- Shot: Left
- Played for: Lahti Pelicans; Leksands IF; Calgary Flames; St. Louis Blues; HV71; HC Lugano; Rögle BK
- National team: Finland
- NHL draft: Undrafted
- Playing career: 1976–1996

Kari Pekka Eloranta (born February 29, 1956) is a Finnish former professional ice hockey player who played over 20 years in numerous leagues throughout Europe and North America. Among top-level leagues, he played with Reipas Lahti in the Finnish SM-liiga, Leksands IF, HV71 and Rögle BK in the Swedish Elitserien, the Calgary Flames and St. Louis Blues of the National Hockey League (NHL) and HC Lugano in Switzerland. He played for HV71 in the 1985–86 season, he was awarded the Guldhjälmen. Eloranta was a frequent member of the Finnish national team. In addition to the Canada Cup and World Championships, he was a three-time Olympian and was a member of Finland's silver medal-winning squad at the 1988 Winter Games.

== Career statistics ==
=== Regular season and playoffs ===
			Regular season					Playoffs
Season	Team	League	GP	G	A	Pts	PIM	GP	G	A	Pts	PIM
1972–73	Lahden Reipas	FIN U20	10	10	4	14	12	—	—	—	—	—
1973–74	Lahden Reipas	FIN U20	14	7	14	21	18	—	—	—	—	—
1973–74	Lahden Reipas	FIN.3	12	5	8	13	2	—	—	—	—	—
1974–75	Lahden Reipas	FIN.3	19	10	12	22	24	—	—	—	—	—
1975–76	Kiekkoreipas	FIN.2	35	11	9	20	17	6	3	3	6	6
1976–77	Kiekkoreipas	SM-l	36	4	6	10	34	—	—	—	—	—
1977–78	Kiekkoreipas	SM-l	36	6	6	12	14	—	—	—	—	—
1978–79	Leksands IF	SEL	36	7	10	17	47	3	0	0	0	2
1979–80	Leksands IF	SEL	34	4	5	9	26	2	0	0	0	4
1980–81	Leksands IF	SEL	36	3	13	16	35	—	—	—	—	—
1981–82	Calgary Flames	NHL	19	0	5	5	14	—	—	—	—	—
1981–82	Oklahoma City Stars	CHL	39	3	27	30	31	—	—	—	—	—
1981–82	St. Louis Blues	NHL	12	1	7	8	6	5	0	0	0	0
1982–83	Calgary Flames	NHL	80	4	40	44	43	9	1	3	4	17
1983–84	Calgary Flames	NHL	78	5	34	39	44	6	0	2	2	2
1984–85	Calgary Flames	NHL	65	2	11	13	39	—	—	—	—	—
1985–86	HV71	SEL	36	4	16	20	46	2	0	0	0	0
1986–87	HV71	SEL	35	3	18	21	34	—	—	—	—	—
1986–87	Calgary Flames	NHL	13	1	6	7	9	6	0	2	2	0
1987–88	HC Lugano	NDA	36	4	26	30	30	7	2	5	7	8
1988–89	HC Lugano	NDA	36	11	21	32	17	10	2	6	8	28
1989–90	HC Lugano	NDA	36	8	26	34	36	7	2	4	6	2
1990–91	Hockey Reipas	SM-l	44	7	18	25	18	—	—	—	—	—
1991–92	Rögle BK	SWE.2	35	5	17	22	22	5	0	0	0	12
1992–93	Rögle BK	SEL	38	9	8	17	44	—	—	—	—	—
1993–94	Rögle BK	SEL	40	2	13	15	14	3	0	0	0	0
1994–95	Rögle BK	SEL	17	1	3	4	8	—	—	—	—	—
1994–95	Rögle BK	Allsv	18	2	7	9	2	11	0	4	4	4
1995–96	Reipas Lahti	FIN.2	44	5	25	30	34	3	0	1	1	32
1996–97	Lahti Pelicans	FIN.2	1	0	0	0	0	—	—	—	—	—
SM-l totals			116	17	29	46	66	—	—	—	—	—
SEL totals			271	32	87	119	254	16	1	2	3	14
NHL totals			267	13	103	116	155	26	1	7	8	19

=== International ===
Year	Team	Event	GP	G	A	Pts	PIM
1975	Finland	WJC	5	0	0	0	4
1975	Finland	EJC	5	0	1	1	0
1976	Finland	WJC	4	0	1	1	2
1979	Finland	WC	6	0	0	0	4
1980	Finland	OG	7	0	4	4	0
1981	Finland	WC	8	1	2	3	6
1986	Finland	WC	10	3	1	4	2
1988	Finland	OG	8	0	6	6	2
1989	Finland	WC	10	1	3	4	12
1991	Finland	CC	6	0	1	1	4
1992	Finland	OG	8	0	2	2	4
Junior totals			14	0	2	2	6
Senior totals			63	5	19	24	34
