= Peter Åslin =

Swedish ice hockey player

- Born: 21 September 1962 Norrtälje, Sweden
- Died: 19 January 2012 (aged 49) Leksand, Sweden
- Height: 6 ft 0 in (183 cm)
- Weight: 185 lb (84 kg; 13 st 3 lb)
- Position: Goaltender
- Caught: Left
- Played for: AIK; Mora; Leksand; HV71
- National team: Sweden
- NHL draft: 125th overall, 1981; St. Louis Blues
- Playing career: 1980–1999

Peter Åslin
Medal record

Representing Sweden

Ice hockey

Olympic Games
Bronze medal – third place	1988 Calgary	

World Championships
Silver medal – second place	1993 Germany	
Gold medal – first place	1992 Czechoslovakia	
Silver medal – second place	1990 Switzerland	
Silver medal – second place	1986 Soviet Union	

World Junior Championships
Gold medal – first place	1981 West Germany	

Swedish Championships
Gold medal – first place	1995	
Gold medal – first place	1984	
Gold medal – first place	1982	

Peter Karl Åslin (21 September 1962 – 19 January 2012) was a Swedish national team ice hockey goaltender.

Åslin started his international career by winning the IIHF World U20 Championship in 1981, which was Sweden's lone world junior gold for 31 years until the win in Calgary in 2012. Åslin won three Swedish championships; two with AIK of Stockholm in 1982 and 1984, and one with HV71 of Jönköping in 1995. He medalled in each of the four men's World Championships he participated in: gold medal in 1992 in Prague and three silver medals; in 1986, 1990 and 1993. Åslin won an Olympic bronze medal in Calgary in 1988.

Åslin played 91 national team games for Sweden. Married with children, Åslin died on 19 January 2012 in Leksand after having suffered multiple strokes. He was 49.
