= Arto Ruotanen =

Finnish ice hockey player

- Born: April 11, 1965 (age 60); Pyhäjärvi, Finland
- Height: 5 ft 11 in (180 cm)
- Weight: 183 lb (83 kg; 13 st 1 lb)
- Position: Defenceman
- Shot: Right
- Played for: Kärpät; HV71; Berlin Capitals; Rögle BK; IF Troja/Ljungby; Nittorps IK
- National team: Finland
- Playing career: 1979–1998

Arto Sakari Ruotanen (born April 11, 1961) is a retired professional ice hockey defenceman who played in the SM-liiga. He played for Kärpät. He was inducted into the Finnish Hockey Hall of Fame in 2003. He is 5 ft 11 in (180 cm) tall and nicknamed 'Artsi'.

== Career statistics ==
=== Regular season and playoffs ===
			Regular season					Playoffs
Season	Team	League	GP	G	A	Pts	PIM	GP	G	A	Pts	PIM
1977–78	Kärpät	FIN U20	22	2	5	7	26	—	—	—	—	—
1978–79	Kärpät	FIN U20	25	2	15	17	39	—	—	—	—	—
1979–80	Kärpät	FIN U20	14	3	4	7	4	—	—	—	—	—
1979–80	Kärpät	SM-l	18	1	3	4	12	6	2	0	2	2
1980–81	Kärpät	SM-l	36	3	6	9	12	12	1	0	1	12
1981–82	Kärpät	SM-l	36	8	8	16	40	3	0	2	2	0
1982–83	Kärpät	SM-l	36	4	4	8	20	—	—	—	—	—
1983–84	Kärpät	SM-l	33	6	16	22	22	10	0	3	3	4
1984–85	Kärpät	SM-l	34	6	20	26	12	7	0	0	0	2
1985–86	Kärpät	SM-l	29	5	14	19	26	5	0	1	1	7
1986–87	HV71	SEL	36	6	11	17	22	—	—	—	—	—
1987–88	HV71	SEL	37	5	15	20	38	2	1	0	1	2
1988–89	HV71	SEL	39	8	24	32	36	3	0	1	1	2
1989–90	HV71	SEL	40	4	11	15	44	—	—	—	—	—
1990–91	HV71	SEL	33	5	7	12	24	2	0	1	1	6
1991–92	HV71	SEL	38	2	19	21	24	—	—	—	—	—
1992–93	Berlin Capitals	1.GBun	24	3	3	6	16	—	—	—	—	—
1993–94	Rögle BK	SEL	31	1	7	8	26	—	—	—	—	—
1994–95	Rögle BK	SEL	19	1	4	5	8	—	—	—	—	—
1994–95	Rögle BK	Allsv	18	3	8	11	24	11	2	4	6	6
1995–96	Rögle BK	SEL	21	1	5	6	32	—	—	—	—	—
1995–96	Rögle BK	Allsv	18	4	9	13	4	12	2	5	7	6
1996–97	IF Troja/Ljungby	SWE.2	40	2	12	14	69	—	—	—	—	—
1997–98	Nittorps IK	SWE.3	32	4	13	17	—	—	—	—	—	—
SM-l totals			222	33	71	104	144	43	3	6	9	27
SEL totals			294	33	103	136	254	7	1	2	3	10

=== International ===
Year	Team	Event	GP	G	A	Pts	PIM
1979	Finland	EJC	5	1	1	2	2
1981	Finland	WJC	5	0	1	1	0
1984	Finland	OG	6	0	4	4	8
1985	Finland	WC	10	0	5	5	8
1986	Finland	WC	10	1	1	2	8
1987	Finland	WC	9	0	0	0	8
1988	Finland	OG	7	0	2	2	2
1990	Finland	WC	10	0	3	3	8
1991	Finland	CC	6	0	0	0	2
1991	Finland	WC	10	0	1	1	4
1992	Finland	OG	8	0	2	2	2
1992	Finland	WC	8	1	3	4	4
Junior totals			10	1	2	3	2
Senior totals			84	2	21	23	54
