= Jukka Tammi =

Finnish ice hockey player

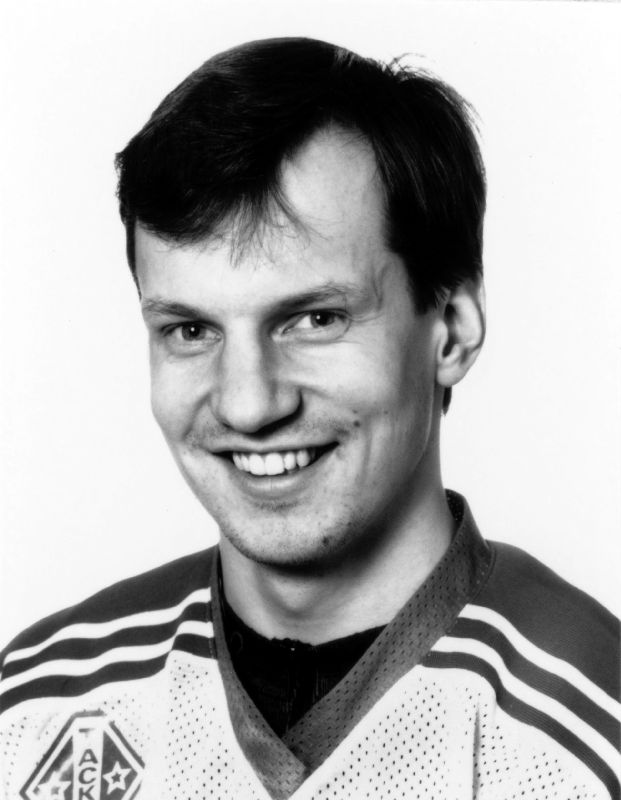
- Born: April 10, 1962 (age 64) Tampere, FIN
- Height: 5 ft 10 in (178 cm)
- Weight: 171 lb (78 kg; 12 st 3 lb)
- Position: Goaltender
- Caught: Left
- Played for: SM-liiga; Ilves; TuTo; DEL; Frankfurt Lions
- National team: Finland
- Playing career: 1980–1999

Olympic medal record

Men's ice hockey
| Silver medal – second place | Calgary 1988 | Team competition |
| Bronze medal – third place | Lillehammer 1994 | Team competition |
| Bronze medal – third place | Nagano 1998 | Team competition |

Jukka Vilho Tapani Tammi (born April 10, 1962 in Tampere, Finland), nicknamed "Taisto", is a retired Finnish ice hockey goaltender.

Tammi is one of the few Finnish ice hockey players to have three or more Olympic medals. He was the "Ironman" of the Finnish SM-liiga, awarded to the player who plays the most consecutive games, and has been inducted into the Finnish Hockey Hall of Fame. Although Tammi was a top Finnish goaltender, he was never drafted by an NHL team.

== Career ==
=== Finland ===
Tammi started his career in the 1980-1981 season when he played for the Tampereen Ilves A-Junior team. Tammi also dressed for three SM-Liiga games, but he did not play until the following year when he played in four games. In 1982-1983 he played 25 games during the regular season, winning the Rookie of the Year award. Tammi went on to play in Ilves for a total of 15 Seasons (1980–1995). After Ilves, Tammi played in TuTo during the 1995-1996 season.

=== Germany ===
In 1996 Tammi moved to Germany and played for the Frankfurt Lions, a Deutsche Eishockey Liga team. Tammi played three seasons for the Lions, retiring after the 1998-99 season.

=== International ===
In addition to his SM-Liiga career, Tammi also had an International career. Tammi was part of Team Finland in total of seven Ice Hockey World Championships, four Winter Olympics and two Canada Cups. Tammi played a total of 213 International games and had one assist.

Highlights of Jukka Tammi's International career are:

- 1988 Winter Olympics: Tammi played in the decisive game against the Soviet Union. Finland won the game and gained its first Olympic Medal in Ice Hockey.
- 1994 World Championships: Tammi was part of the team who won silver, losing to Canada in the final after a shootout.

== Career statistics ==
                                            --- Regular Season ---  ---- Playoffs ----
Season   Team                        Lge    GP    G    A  Pts  PIM  GP   G   A Pts PIM
----
1984-85  Ilves Tampere               FNL    36    0    1    1    4
1985-86  Ilves Tampere               FNL    36    0    0    0    2  --  --  --  --  --
1986-87  Ilves Tampere               FNL    44    0    3    3    8  --  --  --  --  --
1987-88  Ilves Tampere               FNL    44    0    3    3   14
1988-89  Ilves Tampere               FNL    44    0    0    0    6   5   0   0   0   0
1989-90  Ilves Tampere               FNL    44    0    2    2    8   9   0   2   2   4
1990-91  Ilves Tampere               FNL    44    0    1    1   20  --  --  --  --  --
1991-92  Ilves Tampere               FNL    44    0    2    2   10  --  --  --  --  --
1992-93  Ilves Tampere               FNL    40    0    0    0    0
1993-94  Ilves Tampere               FNL    27    0    1    1    4   4   0   0   0   0
1994-95  Ilves Tampere               FNL    50    0    4    4   35  --  --  --  --  --
1995-96  TuTo Turku                  FNL    50    0    3    3   20  --  --  --  --  --
1996-97  Frankfurt Lions             DEL    40    0    3    3    6
1997-98  Frankfurt Lions             DEL    42    0    3    3   35
1998-99  Frankfurt Lions             DEL    43    0    4    4    6
----
                   

| Preceded by Hannu Virta | Winner of the Jarmo Wasama memorial trophy 1982-1983 | Succeeded by Joel Paunio |
| Preceded by Timo Lehkonen | Winner of the Urpo Ylönen trophy 1989-90 | Succeeded by Markus Ketterer |
| Preceded by Jukka Vilander | Winner of the Kultainen kypärä trophy 1989-90 | Succeeded by Teemu Selänne |
