= 1975–76 I-Divisioona season =

The 1975–76 I-Divisioona season was the second season of the I-Divisioona, the second level of Finnish ice hockey. 10 teams participated in the league, and Kiekko-Reipas won the championship.

== Regular season ==
	Club	GP	W	T	L	GF–GA	Pts
1.	Kiekko-Reipas	36	27	2	7	241:122	56
2.	Kärpät Oulu	36	25	0	11	216:126	50
3.	SaiPa Lappeenranta	36	23	4	9	190:141	50
4.	HPK Hämeenlinna	36	17	5	14	182:158	39
5.	KooKoo Kouvola	36	16	6	14	173:170	38
6.	Mikkelin Jukurit	36	15	6	15	147:177	36
7.	SaPKo Savonlinna	36	13	5	18	145:179	31
8.	PiTa Helsinki	36	11	6	19	125:170	28
9.	JYP Jyväskylä	36	8	1	27	139:235	17
10.	JoKP Joensuu	36	4	7	25	93:173	15
