= 1982 IIHF European U18 Championship =

The 1982 IIHF European U18 Championship was the fifteenth playing of the IIHF European Junior Championships.

== Group A ==
Played in Ängelholm and Tyringe, Sweden from March 29 to April 4, 1982.

=== First round ===
Group 1

Poland should have participated in this group but withdrew, instead a Swedish under 17 team took their place, not participating in the championship competition. They lost to the Soviets 8-3, Finland 5-4, and beat Switzerland 9-0.

Team	URS	FIN	SUI	GF/GA	Points
1. Soviet Union		6:3	8:1	14:4	4
2. Finland	3:6		4:2	7:8	2
3. Switzerland	1:8	2:4		3:12	0

Group 2

Team	SWE	TCH	FRG	FRA	GF/GA	Points
1. Sweden		3:2	6:1	23:1	32:4	6
2. Czechoslovakia	2:3		5:1	24:2	31:6	4
3. West Germany	1:6	1:5		3:3	5:14	1
4. France	1:23	2:24	3:3		6:50	1

=== Final round ===
Championship round

Team	SWE	TCH	URS	FIN	GF/GA	Points
1. Sweden		(3:2)	5:3	7:5	15:10	6
2. Czechoslovakia	(2:3)		7:3	8:3	17:9	4
3. Soviet Union	3:5	3:7		(6:3)	12:15	2
4. Finland	5:7	3:8	(3:6)		11:21	0

Placing round

Team	SUI	FRG	FRA	GF/GA	Points
1. Switzerland		2:2	11:3	13:5	3
2. West Germany	2:2		(3:3)	5:5	2
3. France	3:11	(3:3)		6:14	1

- The Swedish under 17 team beat the West Germans 7-2 and the French 18-2.

Poland were relegated to Group B for 1983.

== Tournament Awards ==
- Top Scorer (Czechoslovakia) Petr Rosol (13 points)
- Top Goalie: (Czechoslovakia) Dominik Hašek
- Top Defenceman: (Soviet Union) Alexei Gusarov
- Top Forward: (Sweden) Tomas Sandström

== Group B ==
Played in Sofia, Bulgaria from March 17–24, 1982

=== First round ===
Group 1

Team	AUT	NED	ROM	ITA	GF/GA	Points
1. Austria		5:3	12:1	3:5	20:9	4
2. Netherlands	3:5		3:2	8:5	14:12	4
3. Romania	1:12	2:3		8:3	11:18	2
4. Italy	5:3	5:8	3:8		13:19	2

Group 2

Team	NOR	DEN	BUL	YUG	GF/GA	Points
1. Norway		4:1	7:1	21:0	32:2	6
2. Denmark	1:4		1:1	4:2	6:7	3
3. Bulgaria	1:7	1:1		6:2	8:10	3
4. Yugoslavia	0:21	2:4	2:6		4:31	0

=== Final round ===
Championship round

Team	NOR	AUT	NED	DEN	GF/GA	Points
1. Norway		9:3	4:3	(4:1)	17:7	6
2. Austria	3:9		(5:3)	4:0	12:12	4
3. Netherlands	3:4	(3:5)		7:2	13:11	2
4. Denmark	(1:4)	0:4	2:7		3:15	0

Placing round

Team	ROM	BUL	ITA	YUG	GF/GA	Points
1. Romania		6:3	(8:3)	10:2	24:8	6
2. Bulgaria	3:6		5:5	(6:2)	14:13	3
3. Italy	(3:8)	5:5		7:4	15:17	3
4. Yugoslavia	2:10	(2:6)	4:7		8:23	0

Norway were promoted to Group A, and Yugoslavia were relegated to Group C, for 1983.

== Group C ==
Played in Durham, England, United Kingdom from March 18–25, 1982

Team	HUN	ESP	GBR	GF/GA	Points
1. Hungary		11:6; 4:6	8:4; 6:6	29:22	5
2. Spain	6:11; 6:4		6:5; 4:5	22:25	4
3. Great Britain	4:8; 6:6	5:6; 5:4		20:24	3

Hungary was promoted to Group B for 1983.
