= 1992–93 SM-liiga season =

Finnish ice hockey season

The 1992–93 SM-liiga season was the 18th season of the SM-liiga, the top level of ice hockey in Finland. 12 teams participated in the league, and TPS Turku won the championship.

== Standings ==
Rank	Club	GP	W	T	L	GF	GA	Diff	P
1.	TPS	48	28	8	12	178	138	+40	64
2.	Jokerit	48	28	7	13	185	133	+52	63
3.	HIFK	48	25	6	17	168	160	+8	56
4.	HPK	48	25	4	19	178	137	+41	54
5.	Lukko	48	23	8	17	165	138	+27	54
6.	JyP HT	48	25	4	19	171	146	+25	54
7.	Ässät	48	22	8	18	180	152	+28	52
8.	Ilves	48	20	8	20	150	155	−5	48
9.	Tappara	48	19	8	21	172	155	+17	46
10.	KalPa	48	15	5	26	159	185	−26	39
11.	K-Espoo	48	12	7	29	122	194	−72	31
12.	Reipas Lahti	48	6	3	39	125	260	−135	15

Source: Elite Prospects

== Playoffs ==
=== Quarterfinals ===
- TPS - Ilves 3:1 (6:0, 5:4 P, 1:3, 4:3)
- Jokerit - Ässät 0:3 (6:7, 2:3, 3:4 P)
- HIFK - JYP 1:3 (2:4, 2:5, 4:1, 1:4)
- HPK - Lukko 3:0 (2:0, 4:3, 3:1)

=== Semifinals ===
- TPS - Ässät 3:1 (6:3, 1:4, 6:3, 6:0)
- HPK - JYP 3:2 (6:3, 0:1, 4:1, 1:2, 2:1)

=== 3rd place ===
- JYP - Ässät 4:3

=== Final ===
- TPS - HPK 3:1 (9:3, 5:6, 3:2, 3:1)

== Relegation ==
Rank	Club	GP	W	T	L	P
1.	Reipas Lahti	6	4	1	1	9
2.	KooKoo	6	4	0	2	8
3.	TuTo	6	2	0	4	4
4.	Jokipojat	6	1	1	4	3
