= 1987–88 SM-liiga season =

Finnish ice hockey season

The 1987–88 SM-liiga season was the 13th season of the SM-liiga, the top level of ice hockey in Finland. 10 teams participated in the league, and Tappara Tampere won the championship.

== Standings ==
	Club	GP	W	T	L	GF	GA	Pts
1.	Ilves Tampere	44	30	3	11	227	143	63
2.	HIFK Helsinki	44	29	1	14	192	127	59
3.	Tappara Tampere	44	24	6	14	195	147	54
4.	Lukko Rauma	44	24	1	19	168	140	49
5.	TPS Turku	44	22	3	19	206	182	47
6.	Kärpät Oulu	44	22	2	20	187	172	46
7	Ässät Pori	44	19	4	21	183	195	42
8.	KalPa Kuopio	44	16	4	24	164	220	36
9.	JyP HT Jyväskylä	44	12	5	27	132	199	29
10.	KooKoo Kouvola	44	7	1	36	123	252	15

Source: Elite Prospects

== Playoffs ==
=== Semifinals ===
- Ilves - Lukko 0:3 (1:4, 3:4, 2:6)
- HIFK - Tappara 2:3 (4:1, 0:5, 6:2, 3:15, 5:6 P)

=== 3rd place ===
- Ilves - HIFK 2:6

=== Final ===
- Tappara - Lukko 4:1 (2:3, 4:1, 3:1, 3:0, 5:2)

== Relegation ==
- KooKoo - Kiekkoreipas 3:2 (4:3, 1:5, 3:4, 4:3, 8:5)
