= 1991–92 SM-liiga season =

Finnish ice hockey season

The 1991–92 SM-liiga season was the 17th season of the SM-liiga, the top level of ice hockey in Finland. 12 teams participated in the league, and Jokerit Helsinki won the championship.

== Standings ==
Rank	Club	GP	W	T	L	GF	GA	Diff	P
1.	JyP HT	44	26	8	10	189	129	+60	60
2.	Jokerit	44	28	3	13	195	132	+63	59
3.	TPS	44	29	1	14	181	153	+28	59
4.	Lukko	44	20	9	15	162	121	+41	49
5.	Ässät	44	23	3	18	170	171	-1	49
6.	HIFK	44	22	3	19	183	166	+17	47
7.	KalPa	44	18	9	17	167	182	-15	45
8.	HPK	44	18	4	22	191	183	+8	40
9.	Ilves	44	16	3	25	134	155	-21	35
10.	Tappara	44	12	6	26	154	187	-33	30
11.	Reipas Lahti	44	12	6	26	142	202	-60	30
12.	Jokipojat	44	9	7	28	114	201	-87	25

Source: Elite Prospects

== Playoffs ==
=== Quarterfinals ===
- Lukko - Ässät 0:2 (1:4, 0:4)
- TPS - HIFK 1:2 (1:3, 5:3, 3:4)

=== Semifinals ===
- Jokerit - Ässät 3:2 (6:2, 2:3, 6:0, 2:6, 5:0)
- JyP HT - HIFK 3:2 (5:0, 1:4, 5:1, 4:6, 3:2)

=== 3rd place ===
- Ässät - HIFK 2:3

=== Finals ===
- JyP HT - Jokerit 1:4 (2:5, 1:5, 3:2, 3:4, 0:4)
