= 1990–91 SM-liiga season =

Finnish ice hockey season

The 1990–91 SM-liiga season was the 16th season of the SM-liiga, the top level of ice hockey in Finland. 12 teams participated in the league, and TPS Turku won the championship.

== Standings ==
Rank	Club	GP	W	T	L	GF	GA	Diff	P
1.	TPS	44	27	5	12	168	109	+59	59
2.	KalPa	44	24	4	16	174	170	+4	52
3.	JyP HT	44	22	4	18	177	136	+41	48
4.	HPK	44	21	5	18	173	181	-8	47
5.	HIFK	44	22	1	21	169	163	+6	45
6.	Tappara	44	21	3	20	187	188	-1	45
7.	Reipas	44	21	2	21	169	170	-1	44
8.	Ässät	44	20	3	21	182	191	-9	43
9.	Jokerit	44	17	6	21	150	162	-12	40
10.	Ilves	44	16	6	22	158	185	-27	38
11.	Lukko	44	16	3	25	178	177	+1	35
12.	SaiPa	44	15	2	27	164	217	-53	32

Source: Elite Prospects

== Playoffs ==
=== Quarterfinals ===
- JyP HT - Tappara Tampere 2:1 (7:2, 3:4, 3:2)
- HPK - HIFK 2:1 (2:4, 4:3, 8:3)

=== Semifinals ===
- TPS - HPK 3:1 (8:0, 3:4, 3:0, 3:1)
- KalPa - JyP HT 3:0 (2:1, 4:3, 3:2)

=== 3rd place ===
- HPK - JyP HT 6:3

=== Final ===
- TPS - KalPa 4:1 (5:1, 4:3, 4:3, 2:6, 7:2)
