= Kalevi Numminen trophy =

The Kalevi Numminen trophy is an ice hockey award given by the Finnish Liiga to the best coach of the season. In 2019 it was awarded to Antti Pennanen of HPK.

Trophy Winners:

1977-78: Kari Mäkinen (Ässät)

1978-79: Veli-Pekka Roiha (Reipas Lahti)

1979-80: Jorma Rikala (HIFK)

1980-81: Kari Mäkinen (Kärpät)

1981-82: Rauno Korpi (Tappara)

1982-83: Reino Ruotsalainen (Jokerit)

1983-84: Pentti Matikainen (Kärpät)

1984-85: Seppo Hiitelä (Ilves)

1985-86: Rauno Korpi (Tappara)

1986-87: Rauno Korpi (Tappara)

1987-88: Pentti Matikainen (HIFK)

1988-89: Hannu Aravirta (JYP)

1989-90: Hannu Jortikka (TPS)

1990-91: Hannu Jortikka (TPS)

1991-92: Harri Rindell (HIFK)

1992-93: Vladimir Jursinov (TPS)

1993-94: Vladimir Jursinov (TPS)

1994-95: Vladimir Jursinov (TPS)

1995-96: Sakari Pietilä (HPK)

1996-97: Hannu Kapanen (HPK)

1997-98: Erkka Westerlund (HIFK)

1998-99: Hannu Jortikka (TPS)

1999-00: Hannu Jortikka (TPS)

2000-01: Hannu Jortikka (TPS)

2001-02: Raimo Summanen (Jokerit)

2002-03: Jukka Rautakorpi (Tappara)

2003-04: Kari Heikkilä (Kärpät)

2004-05: Kari Jalonen (Kärpät)

2005-06: Jukka Jalonen (HPK)

2006-07: Kari Jalonen (Kärpät)

2007-08: Petri Matikainen (Blues)

2008-09: Risto Dufva (JYP)

2009-10: Kai Suikkanen (TPS)

2010-11: Petri Matikainen (Blues)

2011-12: Jyrki Aho (JYP)

2012-13: Karri Kivi (Ässät)

2013-14: Pekka Tirkkonen (SaiPa)

2014-15: Lauri Marjamäki (Kärpät)

2015-16: Jussi Tapola (Tappara)

2016-17: Pekka Virta (KalPa)

2017-18: Mikko Manner (Kärpät)

2018-19: Antti Pennanen (HPK)

2019-20: Jussi Ahokas (KooKoo)

2020-21: Pekka Virta (Lukko)

2021-22: Olli Jokinen (Jukurit)

2022-23: Tommi Niemelä (Pelicans)

2023-24: Rikard Grönborg (Tappara)

2024-25: Raimo Helminen (SaiPa)

2025-26: Jouko Myrrä (KooKoo)
