= 2010–11 SM-liiga season =

2010–11 SM-liiga
- League: SM-liiga
- Sport: Ice hockey
- Duration: September 2010 – April 2011
- Teams: 14
- TV partner(s): UrhoTV, Nelonen

Regular season
- Best record: JYP
- Runners-up: Ässät
- Season MVP: Ville Peltonen
- Top scorer: Perttu Lindgren

Playoffs
- Playoffs MVP: Toni Söderholm
- Finals champions: HIFK
- Runners-up: Blues

SM-liiga seasons
- ← 2009–10 2011–12 →

The 2010–11 SM-liiga season was the 36th season of the SM-liiga, the top level of ice hockey in Finland, since the league's formation in 1975. The title was won by HIFK who defeated Espoo Blues in the finals. The title was 7th in team history.

== Teams ==
Team	City	Head coach	Arena	Capacity	Captain
Ässät	Pori	Pekka Rautakallio	Porin jäähalli	6,481	Matti Kuparinen
Blues	Espoo	Petri Matikainen	Barona Areena	6,798	Toni Kähkönen
HIFK	Helsinki	Kari Jalonen	Helsingin jäähalli	8,200	Ville Peltonen
HPK	Hämeenlinna	Harri Rindell	Patria-areena	5,360	Marko Tuulola
Ilves	Tampere	Juha Pajuoja	Tampereen jäähalli	7,600	Pasi Määttänen
Jokerit	Helsinki	Erkka Westerlund*	Hartwall Areena	13,506	Ossi Väänänen
JYP	Jyväskylä	Risto Dufva	Jyväskylän jäähalli	4,618	Juha-Pekka Hytönen
KalPa	Kuopio	Pekka Virta	Niiralan monttu	5,224	Tommi Miettinen
Kärpät	Oulu	Hannu Aravirta*	Oulun Energia Areena	6,768	Ilkka Mikkola
Lukko	Rauma	Rauli Urama	Äijänsuo Arena	5,400	Tomi Pettinen
Pelicans	Lahti	Pari Räsänen*	Isku Areena	5,530	Jan Latvala
SaiPa	Lappeenranta	Ari-Pekka Selin	Kisapuisto	4,825	Ville Koho
Tappara	Tampere	Sami Hirvonen	Tampereen jäähalli	7,600	Pekka Saravo
TPS	Turku	Jukka Koivu*	Turkuhalli	11,820	Ville Vahalahti

- Head coaches listed with asterisk (*) were mid-season replacements.

== Regular season ==
Each team played four times against every other team (twice home and twice away), getting to 52 games. Additionally, the teams were divided to two groups, where teams would play one extra game. One group included Blues, HIFK, Jokerit, JYP, KalPa, Pelicans and SaiPa, while other had HPK, Ilves, Kärpät, Lukko, Tappara, TPS and Ässät.

New addition to schedule was two games where teams could choose the opponents. These were played back-to-back in late January and the choices were made in December, with team with lowest point total to that date was able to choose first. These pairs were: TPS-Ilves, Pelicans-KalPa, SaiPa-Tappara, Kärpät-Blues, Jokerit-HIFK, Lukko-Ässät and HPK-JYP.

Team	GP	W	OTW	OTL	L	GF	GA	+/−	P
JYP	60	39	4	4	13	186	97	+89	129
Ässät	60	30	11	7	12	176	132	+44	119
HIFK	60	31	6	12	11	199	140	+59	117
Lukko	60	27	6	5	22	175	157	+18	98
KalPa	60	26	9	2	23	150	141	+9	98
Jokerit	60	25	6	9	20	165	150	+15	96
HPK	60	25	4	9	22	154	151	+3	92
Kärpät	60	23	8	4	25	151	161	−10	89
Blues	60	21	8	7	24	142	151	−9	86
Ilves	60	21	7	4	28	161	192	−31	81
Tappara	60	17	7	6	30	142	181	−39	71
SaiPa	60	16	4	9	31	137	186	−49	65
TPS	60	12	8	8	32	134	186	−52	60
Pelicans	60	17	2	4	37	133	180	−47	59

Source: Elite Prospects

== Playoffs ==
=== Wild card round (best-of-three) ===
HPK – Ilves 0–2

HPK-Ilves 3–5
Ilves-HPK 5–2

Kärpät – Blues 1–2

Kärpät-Blues 2–3 (OT)
Blues-Kärpät 3–5
Kärpät-Blues 1–2 (OT)

=== Quarterfinals (best-of-seven) ===
JYP – Ilves 4–0

JYP-Ilves 7–3
Ilves-JYP 1–2
JYP-Ilves 4–3
Ilves-JYP 2–3

Ässät – Blues 2–4

Ässät-Blues 3–4 (OT)
Blues-Ässät 3–0
Ässät-Blues 1–2
Blues-Ässät 1–5
Ässät-Blues 2–0
Blues-Ässät 3–0

HIFK – Jokerit 4–3

HIFK-Jokerit 0–1
Jokerit-HIFK 4–2
HIFK-Jokerit 2–1
Jokerit-HIFK 2–3 (OT)
HIFK-Jokerit 1–3
Jokerit-HIFK 1–2 (OT)
HIFK-Jokerit 5–1

Lukko – KalPa 4–3

Lukko-KalPa 2–3
KalPa-Lukko 3–0
Lukko-KalPa 2–1
KalPa-Lukko 2–5
Lukko-KalPa 5–0
KalPa-Lukko 3–2 (2OT)
Lukko-KalPa 5–1

=== Semifinals (best-of-seven) ===
JYP – Blues 1–4

JYP-Blues 1–3
Blues-JYP 4–3
JYP-Blues 4–2
Blues-JYP 2–0
JYP-Blues 1–3

HIFK – Lukko 4–1

HIFK-Lukko 2–3 (3OT)
Lukko-HIFK 1–3
HIFK-Lukko 5–2
Lukko-HIFK 0–3
HIFK-Lukko 7–1

=== Bronze medal game ===
JYP-Lukko 2–4

=== Finals (best-of-seven) ===
HIFK-Blues 4–0

HIFK-Blues 3–2
Blues-HIFK 1–5
HIFK-Blues 5–3
Blues-HIFK 2–4
