= 2017–18 Liiga season =

2017–18 SM-liiga
- League: SM-Liiga
- Sport: Ice hockey
- Duration: September 2017 – April 2018
- Number of teams: 15
- TV partner(s): Nelonen

Regular season
- Best record: Oulun Kärpät
- Runners-up: TPS
- Season MVP: Julius Junttila (Kärpät)
- Top scorer: Antti Suomela (JYP)

Playoffs
- Playoffs MVP: Julius Junttila (Kärpät)
- Finals champions: Oulun Kärpät
- Runners-up: Tappara

SM-liiga seasons
- ← 2016–17 2018–19 →

The 2017–18 SM-liiga season was the 43rd season of the SM-liiga (branded simply as "Liiga"), the top level of ice hockey in Finland, since the league's formation in 1975. Tappara was the season as a defending champion. This season included a record number of matches played on Fridays and Saturdays. In autumn, there was a national team break from 5 November until 13 November.

The specialties of the season included, for the first time in SM-liiga history, double games between KooKoo and Vaasan Sport. Teams met twice in October in consecutive evenings in Kouvola and in February twice in succession in Vaasa. In December, HIFK and Kärpät met in the hockey outdoor show at Kaisaniemi, Helsinki.

In 2018, the SM-liiga continued on Wednesday, 3 January. Ice hockey at the 2018 Winter Olympics in South Korea's Pyeongchang start with the Finland men's national ice hockey team on February 14, 2018. In SM-liiga, a full round was played on Saturday 17 February, after which the Olympic Games started. Liiga games resumed on Tuesday, February 27.

Kärpät won the championship by winning Tappara in the final series 4–2.

== Teams ==
Location of teams in 2017–2018 Liiga

Team	City	Head coach	Arena	Capacity	Captain
HIFK	Helsinki	Ari-Pekka Selin	Helsingin jäähalli	8,200	Lennart Petrell
HPK	Hämeenlinna	Antti Pennanen	Patria-areena	5,360	Otto Paajanen
Ilves	Tampere	Karri Kivi	Tampereen jäähalli	7,300	Tapio Laakso
Jukurit	Mikkeli	Risto Dufva	Kalevankankaan jäähalli	4,200	Miika Roine
JYP	Jyväskylä	Marko Virtanen	Synergia-areena	4,437	Juha-Pekka Hytönen
KalPa	Kuopio	Sami Kapanen	Niiralan monttu	5,064	Tommi Jokinen
KooKoo	Kouvola	Tuomas Tuokkola	Lumon arena	6,000	Toni Kähkönen
Kärpät	Oulu	Mikko Manner	Oulun Energia Areena	6,614	Lasse Kukkonen
Lukko	Rauma	Pekka Virta	Äijänsuo Arena	5,400	Janne Niskala
Pelicans	Lahti	Petri Matikainen	Isku Areena	5,530	Stefan Lassen
SaiPa	Lappeenranta	Tero Lehterä	Kisapuisto	4,820	Ville Koho
Sport	Vaasa	Tomek Valtonen	Vaasa Arena	4,512	Markus Kankaanperä
Tappara	Tampere	Jukka Rautakorpi	Tampereen jäähalli	7,300	Jukka Peltola
TPS	Turku	Kalle Kaskinen	HK Arena	11,820	Tomi Kallio
Ässät	Pori	~~Jyrki Aho~~14 Jan 2018; Mikael Kotkaniemi	Porin jäähalli	6,280	Matti Kuparinen

== Regular season ==
Top six advance straight to quarter-finals, while teams between 7th and 10th positions play wild card round for the final two spots. The SM-liiga is a closed series and thus there is no relegation.

Pos	Team	Pld	W	OTW	OTL	L	GF	GA	GD	Pts	Final Result
1	Kärpät (C)	60	33	8	8	11	195	134	+61	123	Advance to Quarterfinals
2	TPS	60	30	7	8	15	187	147	+40	112	Advance to Quarterfinals
3	Tappara	60	25	14	7	14	165	130	+35	110	Advance to Quarterfinals
4	JYP	60	32	4	4	20	187	145	+42	108	Advance to Quarterfinals
5	HIFK	60	26	8	9	17	163	128	+35	103	Advance to Quarterfinals
6	KalPa	60	26	7	7	20	144	136	+8	99	Advance to Quarterfinals
7	SaiPa	60	21	11	8	20	153	163	−10	93	Advance to Wild-card round
8	Ässät	60	23	7	5	25	163	177	−14	88	Advance to Wild-card round
9	Lukko	60	21	8	6	25	141	142	−1	85	Advance to Wild-card round
10	Pelicans	60	20	7	9	24	165	175	−10	83	Advance to Wild-card round
11	Ilves	60	21	5	8	26	162	190	−28	81	
12	HPK	60	20	7	4	29	145	157	−12	78	
13	Jukurit	60	16	5	9	30	133	170	−37	67	
14	KooKoo	60	14	5	10	31	142	198	−56	62	
15	Sport	60	12	7	8	33	153	206	−53	58	

Source: Liiga
(C) Champion

Rules for classification: 1) Points; 2) 3-point wins 3) Goal difference; 4) Goals scored; 5) Head-to-head points.

== Playoffs ==
=== Bracket ===
Wild-card round (best-of-3)
7	SaiPa	2
10	Pelicans	1
8	Ässät	2
9	Lukko	0

Quarter-finals (best-of-7)
1	Kärpät	4
8	Ässät	1
2	TPS	4
7	SaiPa	2
3	Tappara	4
6	KalPa	2
4	JYP	2
5	HIFK	4

Semi-finals (best-of-7)
1	Kärpät	4
5	HIFK	3
(Pairings are re-seeded after the first and second round)
2	TPS	0
3	Tappara	4

Finals (best-of-7)
1	Kärpät	4
3	Tappara	2
Bronze medal game
2	TPS	0
5	HIFK	1

=== Wild card round ===
SaiPa – Pelicans 2-1
13.3.2018	SaiPa	Pelicans	4-2 ref
15.3.2018	Pelicans	SaiPa	3-0 ref
17.3.2018	SaiPa	Pelicans	3-2 OT1 ref
SaiPa wins the series 2-1.

Ässät – Lukko 2-0
13.3.2018	Ässät	Lukko	2-1 ref
15.3.2018	Lukko	Ässät	2-3 OT1 ref
Ässät wins the series 2-0.

=== Quarterfinals ===
Kärpät – Ässät 4-1
20.3.2018	Kärpät	Ässät	4-1 ref
22.3.2018	Ässät	Kärpät	3-2 ref
24.3.2018	Kärpät	Ässät	3-1 ref
26.3.2018	Ässät	Kärpät	1-3 ref
28.3.2018	Kärpät	Ässät	5-1 ref
Kärpät wins the series 4-1.

Tappara – KalPa 4-2
21.3.2018	Tappara	KalPa	3-2 ref
23.3.2018	KalPa	Tappara	4-3 ref
24.3.2018	Tappara	KalPa	4-3 OT1 ref
26.3.2018	KalPa	Tappara	0-3 ref
28.3.2018	Tappara	KalPa	1-3 ref
29.3.2018	KalPa	Tappara	3-4 ref
Tappara wins the series 4-2.

TPS – SaiPa 4-2
20.3.2018	TPS	SaiPa	4-3 OT1 ref
22.3.2018	SaiPa	TPS	5-6 ref
24.3.2018	TPS	SaiPa	7-0 ref
26.3.2018	SaiPa	TPS	3-1 ref
28.3.2018	TPS	SaiPa	0-2 ref
29.3.2018	SaiPa	TPS	1-2 OT1 ref
TPS wins the series 4-2.

JYP – HIFK 2-4
21.3.2018	JYP	HIFK	1-2 ref
23.3.2018	HIFK	JYP	1-2 OT1 ref
24.3.2018	JYP	HIFK	4-3 OT1 ref
26.3.2018	HIFK	JYP	4-1 ref
28.3.2018	JYP	HIFK	6-7 OT1 ref
29.3.2018	HIFK	JYP	2-1 ref
HIFK wins the series 4-2.

=== Semifinals ===
Kärpät – HIFK 4-3
3.4.2018	Kärpät	HIFK	1-4 ref
5.4.2018	HIFK	Kärpät	3-4 OT1 ref
7.4.2018	Kärpät	HIFK	3-0 ref
9.4.2018	HIFK	Kärpät	4-1 ref
11.4.2018	Kärpät	HIFK	2-1 OT1 ref
12.4.2018	HIFK	Kärpät	4-3 OT1 ref
14.4.2018	Kärpät	HIFK	2-1 ref
Kärpät wins the series 4-3.

TPS – Tappara 0-4
4.4.2018	TPS	Tappara	2-3 OT1 ref
6.4.2018	Tappara	TPS	3-0 ref
7.4.2018	TPS	Tappara	1-2 ref
9.4.2018	Tappara	TPS	6-5 OT1 ref
Tappara wins the series 4-0.

=== Bronze medal game ===
20 April 2018; 18:30	TPS	2–3 OT1 (0–1, 2–1, 0–0, 0–1)	HIFK	Gatorade Center, Turku; Attendance: 7,021

Game reference
6 min	Penalties	6 min
23	Shots	36

=== Finals ===
17 April 2018; 18:30	Kärpät	3–0 (0–0, 1–0, 2–0)	Tappara	Oulun Energia Areena, Oulu; Attendance: 5,021

Game reference
2 min	Penalties	16 min
27	Shots	19

19 April 2018; 18:30	Tappara	2–4 (2–1, 0–2, 0–1)	Kärpät	Tampere Ice Stadium, Tampere; Attendance: 6,701

Game reference
2 min	Penalties	8 min
22	Shots	17

21 April 2018; 17:00	Kärpät	2–1 OT1 (0–0, 0–1, 1–0, 1–0)	Tappara	Oulun Energia Areena, Oulu; Attendance: 6,485

Game reference
6 min	Penalties	6 min
28	Shots	24

23 April 2018; 18:30	Tappara	2–0 (0–0, 2–0, 0–0)	Kärpät	Tampere Ice Stadium, Tampere; Attendance: 7,300

Game reference
18 min	Penalties	18 min
36	Shots	21

24 April 2018; 18:30	Kärpät	4–5 (0–3, 1–1, 3–1)	Tappara	Oulun Energia Areena, Oulu; Attendance: 6,550

Game reference
14 min	Penalties	6 min
29	Shots	19

26 April 2018; 18:30	Tappara	0–1 (0–0, 0–0, 0–1)	Kärpät	Tampere Ice Stadium, Tampere; Attendance: 7,279

Game reference
4 min	Penalties	4 min
28	Shots	24

Kärpät wins the series 4-2 and wins the championship.

== Final rankings ==
Gold medal	Kärpät
Silver medal	Tappara
Bronze medal	HIFK
4	TPS
5	JYP
6	KalPa
7	SaiPa
8	Ässät
9	Lukko
10	Pelicans
11	Ilves
12	HPK
13	Jukurit
14	KooKoo
15	Sport

== See also ==
- 2017–18 Mestis season
