= 2011–12 SM-liiga season =

2011–12 SM-liiga
- League: SM-liiga
- Sport: Ice hockey
- Duration: September 2011 – April 2012
- Teams: 14
- TV partner(s): UrhoTV, Nelonen

Regular season
- Best record: KalPa
- Runners-up: Pelicans
- Season MVP: Tomáš Záborský
- Top scorer: Ryan Lasch

Playoffs
- Playoffs MVP: Jani Tuppurainen

Finals
- Champions: JYP
- Runners-up: Pelicans

SM-liiga seasons
- ← 2010–11 2012–13 →

The 2011–12 SM-liiga season was the 37th season of the SM-liiga, the top level of ice hockey in Finland, since the league's formation in 1975. The title was won by JYP Jyväskylä who defeated Pelicans Lahti in the finals. The title was 2nd in team history.

== Teams ==
Team	City	Head coach	Arena	Capacity	Captain
Ässät	Pori	Karri Kivi	Porin jäähalli	6,481	Ville Uusitalo
Blues	Espoo	Lauri Marjamäki	Barona Areena	6,798	Toni Kähkönen
HIFK	Helsinki	Petri Matikainen	Helsingin jäähalli	8,200	Ville Peltonen
HPK	Hämeenlinna	Timo Lehkonen‡	Patria-areena	5,360	Marko Tuulola
Ilves	Tampere	Seppo Hiitelä‡	Tampereen jäähalli	7,600	Martti Järventie
Jokerit	Helsinki	Erkka Westerlund	Hartwall Areena	13,506	Ossi Väänänen
JYP	Jyväskylä	Jyrki Aho‡	Jyväskylän jäähalli	4,618	Juha-Pekka Hytönen
KalPa	Kuopio	Tuomas Tuokkola	Niiralan monttu	5,224	Sami Kapanen
Kärpät	Oulu	Hannu Aravirta	Oulun Energia Areena	6,768	Ilkka Mikkola
Lukko	Rauma	Juha Vuori‡	Äijänsuo Arena	5,400	Otto Honkaheimo
Pelicans	Lahti	Kai Suikkanen	Isku Areena	5,530	Arttu Luttinen
SaiPa	Lappeenranta	Ari-Pekka Selin	Kisapuisto	4,825	Ville Koho
Tappara	Tampere	Risto Dufva‡	Tampereen jäähalli	7,600	Pekka Saravo
TPS	Turku	Pekka Virta	Turkuhalli	11,820	Ville Vahalahti

- Head coaches marked with ‡ took their jobs mid-season.

== Regular season ==
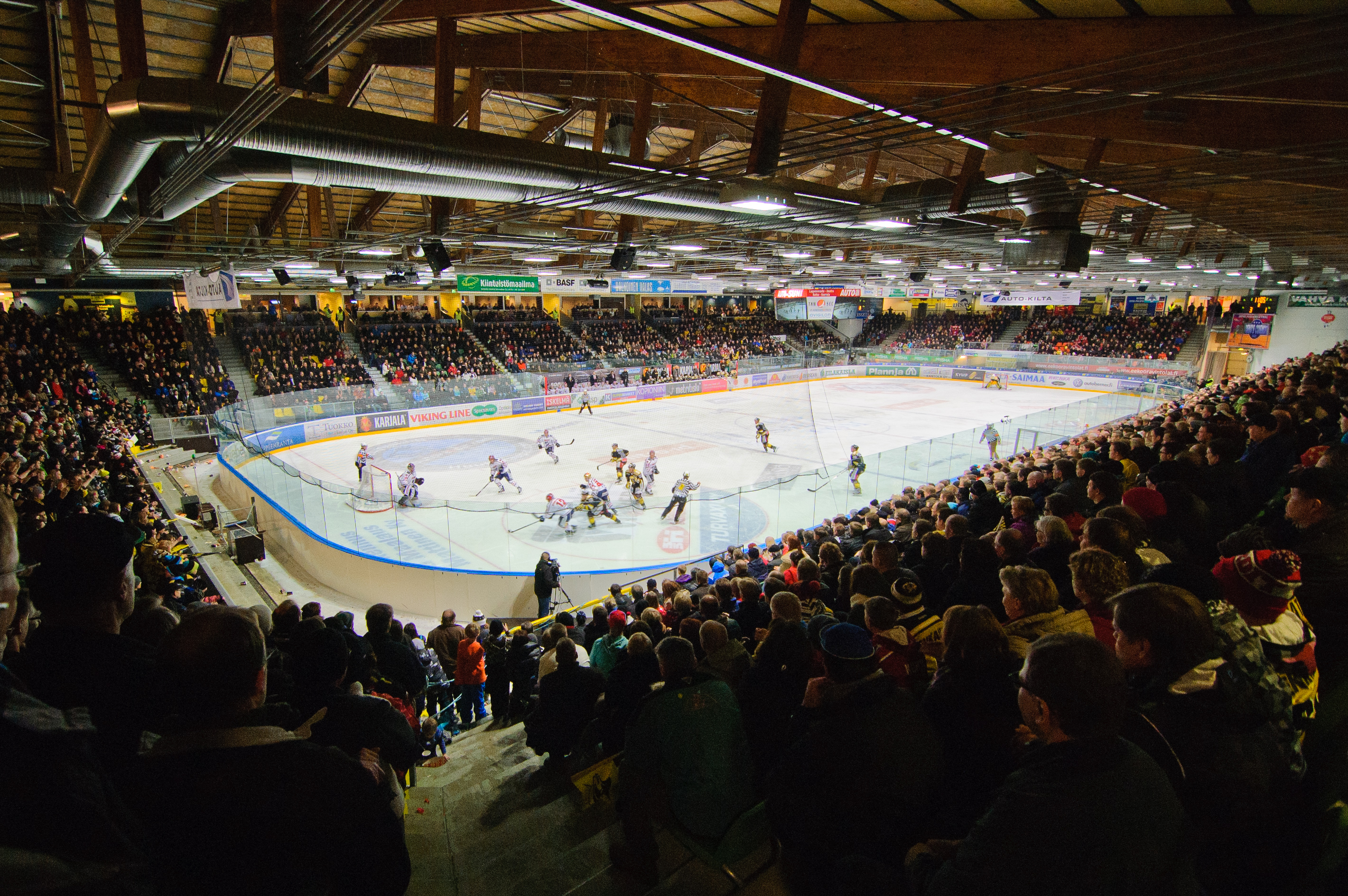
ice hockey game between SaiPa and HIFK in February 21, 2012

Each team played four times against every other team (twice home and twice away), getting to 52 games. Additionally, the teams were divided to two groups, where teams would play one extra game. One group included Blues, HIFK, Jokerit, JYP, KalPa, Pelicans and SaiPa, while other had HPK, Ilves, Kärpät, Lukko, Tappara, TPS and Ässät.

Additionally, there were two games where teams could choose the opponents. These were played back-to-back in January and the choices were made in December, with team with lowest point total to that date was able to choose first. These pairs were: Ilves-Tappara, SaiPa-HPK, TPS-Lukko, Kärpät-Blues, JYP-HIFK, Jokerit-Pelicans and Ässät-KalPa.

Top six advanced straight to quarter-finals, while teams between 7th and 10th positions played wild card round for the final two spots. The last-placed team Ilves will play best-of-seven series against Mestis winner Sport.

Team	GP	W	OTW	OTL	L	GF	GA	+/−	P
KalPa	60	34	3	7	16	180	139	+41	115
Pelicans	60	30	9	3	18	213	155	+58	111
HIFK	60	33	6	0	21	194	149	+45	111
JYP	60	30	7	4	19	168	122	+46	108
Ässät	60	31	4	5	20	189	150	+39	106
Jokerit	60	24	8	13	15	183	155	+28	101
Kärpät	60	29	4	4	23	164	148	+16	99
Blues	60	18	9	10	23	148	165	−17	82
Lukko	60	21	7	4	28	162	167	−5	81
TPS	60	21	6	3	30	134	180	−46	78
SaiPa	60	18	5	13	24	155	176	−21	77
Tappara	60	20	4	5	31	132	188	−56	73
HPK	60	15	6	5	34	132	201	−69	62
Ilves	60	10	8	10	32	140	199	−59	56

Source: Elite Prospects

== Playoffs ==
=== Wild card round (best-of-three) ===
Kärpät-TPS 2–0

Kärpät-TPS 4–1
TPS-Kärpät 1–2

Blues-Lukko 2–1

Blues-Lukko 1–0 (OT)
Lukko-Blues 2–0
Blues-Lukko 6–3

=== Quarterfinals (best-of-seven) ===
KalPa-Blues 3–4

KalPa-Blues 3–1
Blues-KalPa 0–1
KalPa-Blues 5–0
Blues-KalPa 3–1
KalPa-Blues 2–5
Blues-KalPa 4–3 (OT)
KalPa-Blues 1–4

- Blues became first team in SM-liiga history to overcome 0–3 deficit to win the series.

Pelicans-Kärpät 4–3

Pelicans-Kärpät 5–0
Kärpät-Pelicans 4–3 (OT)
Pelicans-Kärpät 1–4
Kärpät-Pelicans 4–1
Pelicans-Kärpät 4–2
Kärpät-Pelicans 3–4 (OT)
Pelicans-Kärpät 3–2

HIFK-Jokerit 0–4

HIFK-Jokerit 1–3
Jokerit-HIFK 3–2 (OT)
HIFK-Jokerit 1–3
Jokerit-HIFK 2–0

JYP-Ässät 4–0

JYP-Ässät 4–1
Ässät-JYP 1–2
JYP-Ässät 4–3
Ässät-JYP 1–4

=== Semifinals (best-of-seven) ===
Pelicans-Blues 4–1

Pelicans-Blues 5–3
Blues-Pelicans 1–3
Pelicans-Blues 1–2 (OT)
Blues-Pelicans 4–6
Pelicans-Blues 2–1

JYP-Jokerit 4–1

JYP-Jokerit 2–1 (OT)
Jokerit-JYP 2–3
JYP-Jokerit 3–2 (2OT)
Jokerit-JYP 2–1
JYP-Jokerit 3–2 (OT)

=== Bronze-medal game ===
Jokerit-Blues 4–3 (2OT)

=== Finals (best-of-seven) ===
Pelicans-JYP 1–4

Pelicans-JYP 2–0
JYP-Pelicans 6–2
Pelicans-JYP 1–4
JYP-Pelicans 5–4 (OT)
Pelicans-JYP 1–2 (OT)

== Relegation (best-of-seven) ==
Ilves-Sport 4–1

Ilves-Sport 6–1
Sport-Ilves 1–5
Ilves-Sport 0–2
Sport-Ilves 2–3 (OT)
Ilves-Sport 4–0
