= 2009–10 SM-liiga season =

2009–10 SM-liiga
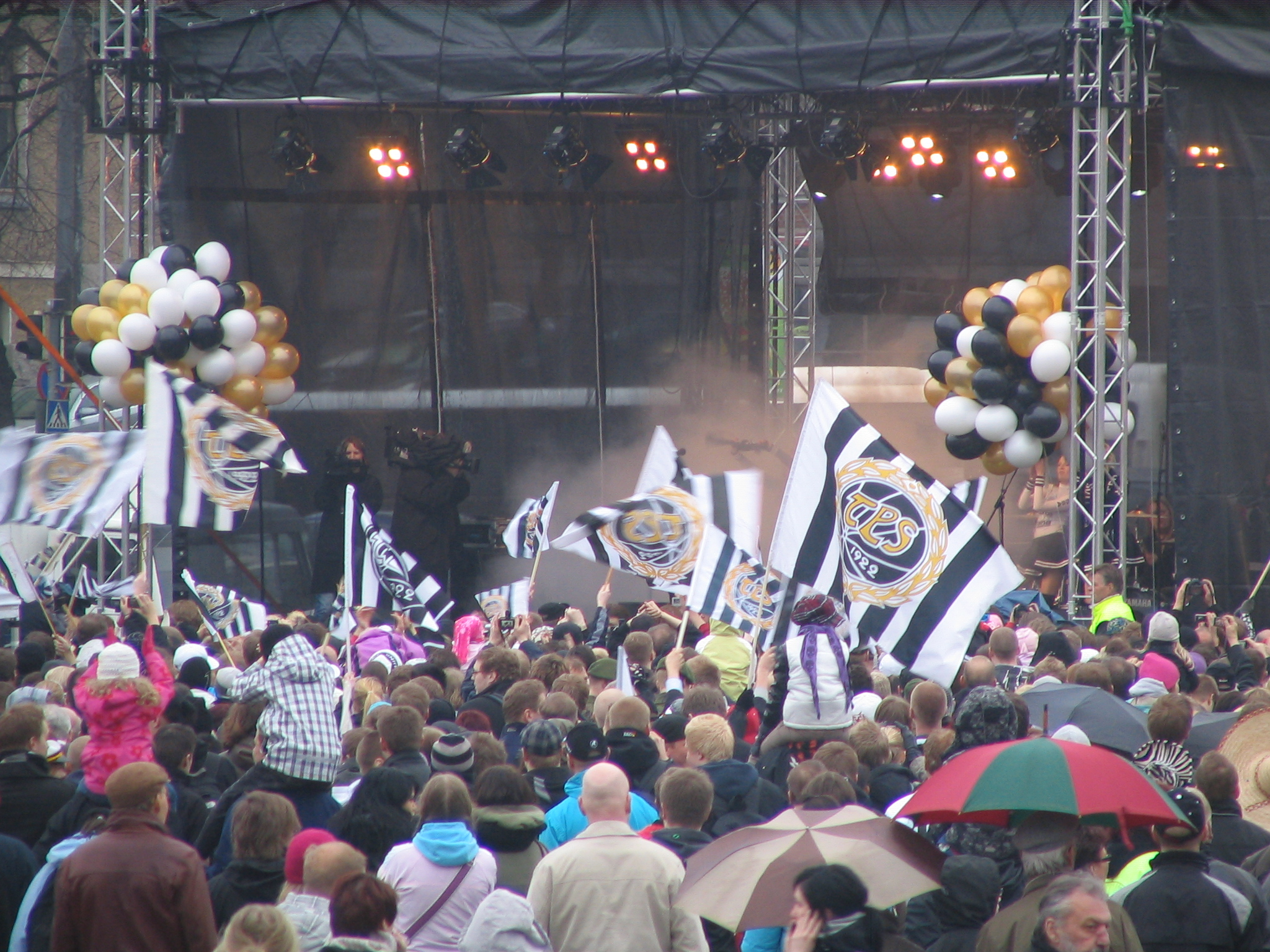
- League: SM-liiga
- Sport: Ice hockey
- Duration: September 10, 2009 – April 2010
- Number of teams: 14
- TV partner(s): URHOtv, Nelonen Sport Pro

Regular season
- Best record: JYP
- Runners-up: KalPa
- Season MVP: Jori Lehterä (Tappara)
- Top scorer: Jori Lehterä (Tappara)

Playoffs
- Playoffs MVP: Ilari Filppula (TPS)

Kanada-malja
- Champions: TPS
- Runners-up: HPK

SM-liiga seasons
- ← 2008–09 2010–11 →

The 2009–10 SM-liiga season was the 35th season of the SM-liiga, the top level of ice hockey in Finland, since the league's formation in 1975. TPS won the Kanada-malja and Ilari Filppula from TPS won the Jari Kurri trophy. In the regular season, JYP finished atop the league, Jori Lehterä led the league in points and assists, and three players – Jukka Hentunen, Jonas Enlund, and Juhamatti Aaltonen – tied for the league lead in goals.

== Teams ==
Team	City	Head coach	Arena	Capacity	Captain
Ässät	Pori	Pekka Rautakallio	Porin jäähalli	6,481	Matti Kuparinen
Blues	Espoo	Petri Matikainen	Barona Areena	6,798	Toni Kähkönen
HIFK	Helsinki	Kari Jalonen	Helsingin jäähalli	8,200	Kim Hirschovits
HPK	Hämeenlinna	Jukka Rautakorpi	Patria-areena	5,360	Jukka Laamanen
Ilves	Tampere	Juha Pajuoja*	Tampereen jäähalli	7,600	Pasi Määttänen
Jokerit	Helsinki	Hannu Jortikka*	Hartwall Areena	13,506	Antti-Jussi Niemi
JYP	Jyväskylä	Risto Dufva	Jyväskylän jäähalli	4,618	Juha-Pekka Hytönen
KalPa	Kuopio	Pekka Virta	Niiralan monttu	5,224	Sami Kapanen
Kärpät	Oulu	Mikko Haapakoski*	Oulun Energia Areena	6,614	Ilkka Mikkola
Lukko	Rauma	Rauli Urama	Äijänsuo Arena	5,400	Antti Laaksonen
Pelicans	Lahti	Mika Toivola	Isku Areena	4,910	Erik Kakko
SaiPa	Lappeenranta	Ari-Pekka Selin	Kisapuisto	4,847	Ville Koho
Tappara	Tampere	Mikko Saarinen	Tampereen jäähalli	7,600	Janne Ojanen
TPS	Turku	Kai Suikkanen	Turkuhalli	11,800	Aki Berg

- Head coaches with asterisk replaced original coaches mid-season.

== Regular season ==
Team	GP	W	OTW	OTL	L	GF	GA	+/−	P
JYP	58	31	6	6	15	173	132	+41	111
KalPa	58	31	5	6	16	164	135	+29	109
Lukko	58	30	5	7	16	178	136	+42	107
HIFK	58	30	6	2	20	185	152	+33	104
HPK	58	26	3	7	22	153	154	−1	91
TPS	58	25	6	2	25	169	169	0	89
Tappara	58	24	4	6	24	181	181	0	86
Blues	58	19	9	7	23	145	155	−10	82
Kärpät	58	21	7	4	26	150	163	−13	81
Jokerit	58	22	4	4	28	144	157	−13	78
SaiPa	58	20	6	5	27	154	176	−22	77
Pelicans	58	18	6	7	27	166	197	−31	73
Ässät	58	18	7	4	29	151	170	−19	72
Ilves	58	17	0	7	34	155	191	−36	58

== Playoffs ==
Wild Card Round
7	Tappara	2
10	Jokerit	1
8	Blues	1
9	Karpat	2

Quarterfinals
1	JYP	4
9	Karpat	3
2	KalPa	4
7	Tappara	2
3	Lukko	0
6	TPS	4
4	HIFK	2
5	HPK	4

Semi-finals
1	JYP	2
6	TPS	4
(Pairings are re-seeded after the first and second round)
2	KalPa	2
5	HPK	4

Finals
6	TPS	4
5	HPK	1
