= Raimo Summanen =

Finnish ice hockey player and coach

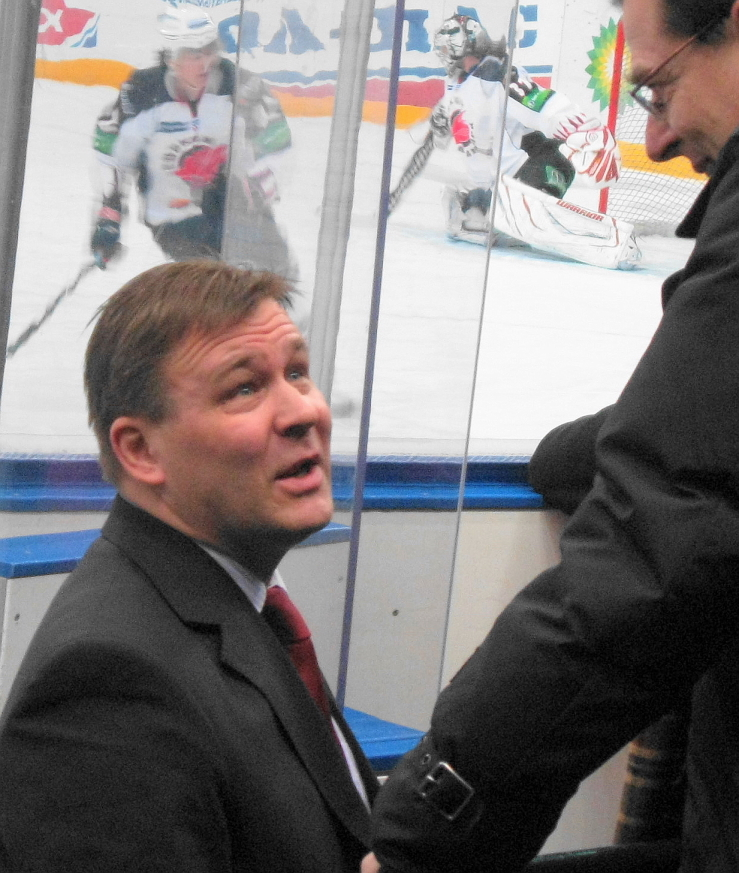
- Summanen in 2010
- Born: March 2, 1962 (age 64) Jyväskylä, Finland
- Height: 5 ft 11 in (180 cm)
- Weight: 180 lb (82 kg; 12 st 12 lb)
- Position: Left wing
- Shot: Left
- Played for: SM-liiga; Reipas; Ilves; HPK; TPS; Jokerit; 1. Divisioona; JYP; NHL; Edmonton Oilers; Vancouver Canucks; Nationalliga A SC Bern
- National team: Finland
- NHL draft: 125th overall, 1982; Edmonton Oilers
- Playing career: 1979–1995

Medal record

Representing Finland

Men's ice hockey

World Championships
Gold medal – first place	1995 Sweden	

World Junior Championships
Bronze medal – third place	1982 Canada & USA	

Raimo Olavi Summanen (born March 2, 1962) is a Finnish former professional ice hockey forward and the former head coach of HIFK of the Finnish SM-liiga. He is also a former coach of the Finnish national team. He was selected by the Edmonton Oilers in the sixth round of the 1982 NHL entry draft, 125th overall, and spent his NHL career, which lasted from 1984 to 1987 with Edmonton and the Vancouver Canucks. The rest of his career, which lasted from 1979 to 1995, was mainly spent in the SM-liiga.

== Playing career ==
In 1984 Summanen, who was born in Jyväskylä, joined the Edmonton Oilers from Europe at the end of the regular season. He played 2 regular season games and 5 playoff games. Summanen has a 1984 Stanley Cup ring and is part of the Edmonton Oilers' first Stanley Cup winning picture. His name was left off the Cup because he did not officially qualify.

Summanen also played extensively in Finland, both before and after his NHL days, and in the American Hockey League. He played for the Finnish national team when they won their first Ice Hockey World Championships gold medal in 1995 and retired after the tournament.

== Coaching career ==
Summanen coached the Finnish national team to a 2nd-place finish in the 2004 World Cup of Hockey. However, his reported abrasiveness with players and management led to his dismissal. Even during Finland's successful World Cup performance, defenceman Janne Niinimaa left the team after "conflicts with the coaching staff." He also had a testy relationship with the national team's manager, Timo Jutila.

In 2010, Summanen succeeded Igor Nikitin as the head coach of Avangard Omsk, a leading KHL side. The team went from strength to strength and ended up as the top team of the regular season (largely due to an impressive 18-game winning streak lasting from December to February). However, some players were reportedly unhappy with Summanen's abrasive coaching methods. He was relieved of his coaching duties before game seven of the Eastern Conference semifinals, which the team went on to lose. The club cited health issues as an official explanation. However, according to anonymous sources within the team, the real reason behind it was a major conflict with the players. There were reports that Summanen even tried to challenge Avangard's star Jaromír Jágr to a fight.

== Career statistics ==
=== Regular season and playoffs ===
			Regular season					Playoffs
Season	Team	League	GP	G	A	Pts	PIM	GP	G	A	Pts	PIM
1979–80	JYP	FIN.2	31	22	12	34	16	—	—	—	—	—
1980–81	JYP	FIN U20	9	12	12	24	4	—	—	—	—	—
1980–81	JYP	FIN.2	35	15	18	33	24	—	—	—	—	—
1981–82	Kiekkoreipas	FIN U20	1	3	2	5	0	—	—	—	—	—
1981–82	Kiekkoreipas	SM-l	36	15	6	21	17	2	2	0	2	0
1982–83	Ilves	SM-l	36	45	15	60	36	8	7	3	10	2
1983–84	Ilves	SM-l	37	28	19	47	26	1	0	0	0	0
1983–84	Edmonton Oilers	NHL	2	1	4	5	2	5	1	4	5	0
1984–85	Edmonton Oilers	NHL	9	0	4	4	0	—	—	—	—	—
1984–85	Nova Scotia Oilers	AHL	66	20	33	53	2	5	1	2	3	0
1985–86	Edmonton Oilers	NHL	73	19	18	37	16	5	1	1	2	0
1986–87	Edmonton Oilers	NHL	48	10	7	17	15	—	—	—	—	—
1986–87	Vancouver Canucks	NHL	10	4	4	8	0	—	—	—	—	—
1987–88	Vancouver Canucks	NHL	9	2	3	5	2	—	—	—	—	—
1987–88	Fredericton Express	AHL	20	7	15	22	38	—	—	—	—	—
1987–88	Flint Spirits	IHL	7	1	1	2	0	—	—	—	—	—
1988–89	Ilves	SM-l	44	35	46	81	22	5	4	3	7	6
1989–90	Ilves	SM-l	40	39	31	70	42	9	3	4	7	8
1990–91	HPK	SM-l	39	25	30	55	67	8	6	2	8	20
1991–92	Ilves	SM-l	26	13	9	22	94	—	—	—	—	—
1992–93	TPS	SM-l	47	17	20	37	50	10	8	8	16	26
1993–94	SC Bern	NDA	10	5	13	18	24	—	—	—	—	—
1993–94	Jokerit	SM-l	25	9	3	12	44	—	—	—	—	—
1994–95	TPS	SM-l	47	23	26	49	53	12	7	4	11	29
SM-l totals			385	253	209	462	459	55	37	24	61	91
NHL totals			151	36	40	76	35	10	2	5	7	0

=== International ===
Year	Team	Event	GP	G	A	Pts	PIM
1980	Finland	EJC	5	2	0	2	2
1982	Finland	WJC	7	7	9	16	0
1983	Finland	WC	9	0	3	3	0
1984	Finland	OLY	6	4	6	10	4
1987	Finland	WC	10	2	0	2	2
1987	Finland	CC	5	1	1	2	0
1990	Finland	WC	10	5	3	8	10
1991	Finland	WC	10	1	1	2	6
1991	Finland	CC	6	0	1	1	0
1992	Finland	OLY	8	2	0	2	6
1995	Finland	WC	8	1	1	2	0
Junior totals			12	9	9	18	2
Senior totals			72	16	16	32	28

== Awards ==
- (gold) SM-liiga, Kanada-malja (3): 1992–93, 1993–94, 1994–95
- (bronze) IIHF European Cup (1): 1994
- Veli-Pekka Ketola trophy for most points scored in the SM-liiga regular season – 1989 and 1990

head coach

- (gold) SM-liiga, Kanada-malja (1): 2001–02
- Kalevi Numminen trophy for the best coach in the SM-liiga – 2002
- (gold) IIHF Continental Cup (1): 2002–03
- (silver) World Cup of Hockey (1): 2004
- (gold) KHL, Continental Cup (1): 2010–11
- (silver) KHL, Gagarin Cup (1): 2011-12
- (gold) Alps Hockey League, (1): 2020–21

== Transactions ==
- March 10, 1987 - Edmonton trades Summanen to Vancouver in exchange for Moe Lemay

Preceded by Reijo Leppänen	Winner of the Aarne Honkavaara trophy 1982–83	Succeeded by Arto Javanainen
Preceded by Jukka Vilander	Winner of the Aarne Honkavaara trophy 1989–90	Succeeded by Arto Javanainen
Preceded by Esa Keskinen	Winner of the Veli-Pekka Ketola trophy 1988–89 & 1989–90	Succeeded by Teppo Kivelä
Preceded by Hannu Jortikka	Winner of the Kalevi Numminen trophy 2001–02	Succeeded by Jukka Rautakorpi

Preceded by Erkka Westerlund	Jokerit head coach 2001 – 2003	Succeeded by Hannu Jortikka
Preceded by Hannu Aravirta	Finnish national ice hockey team coach 2003 – 2004	Succeeded by Erkka Westerlund
Preceded by Igor Nikitin	Avangard Omsk head coach 2010 – 2011	Succeeded by Rostislav Čada
Preceded by Rostislav Čada	Avangard Omsk head coach 2011 – 2012	Succeeded by Petri Matikainen
Preceded by Pasi Sormunen	HIFK head coach 2013 – 2014	Succeeded by Harri Rindell
Preceded by Miloš Říha	Avangard Omsk head coach 2014 – 2015	Succeeded by Yevgeni Kornoukhov
