= Lauri Marjamäki =

Finnish ice hockey coach (born 1977)

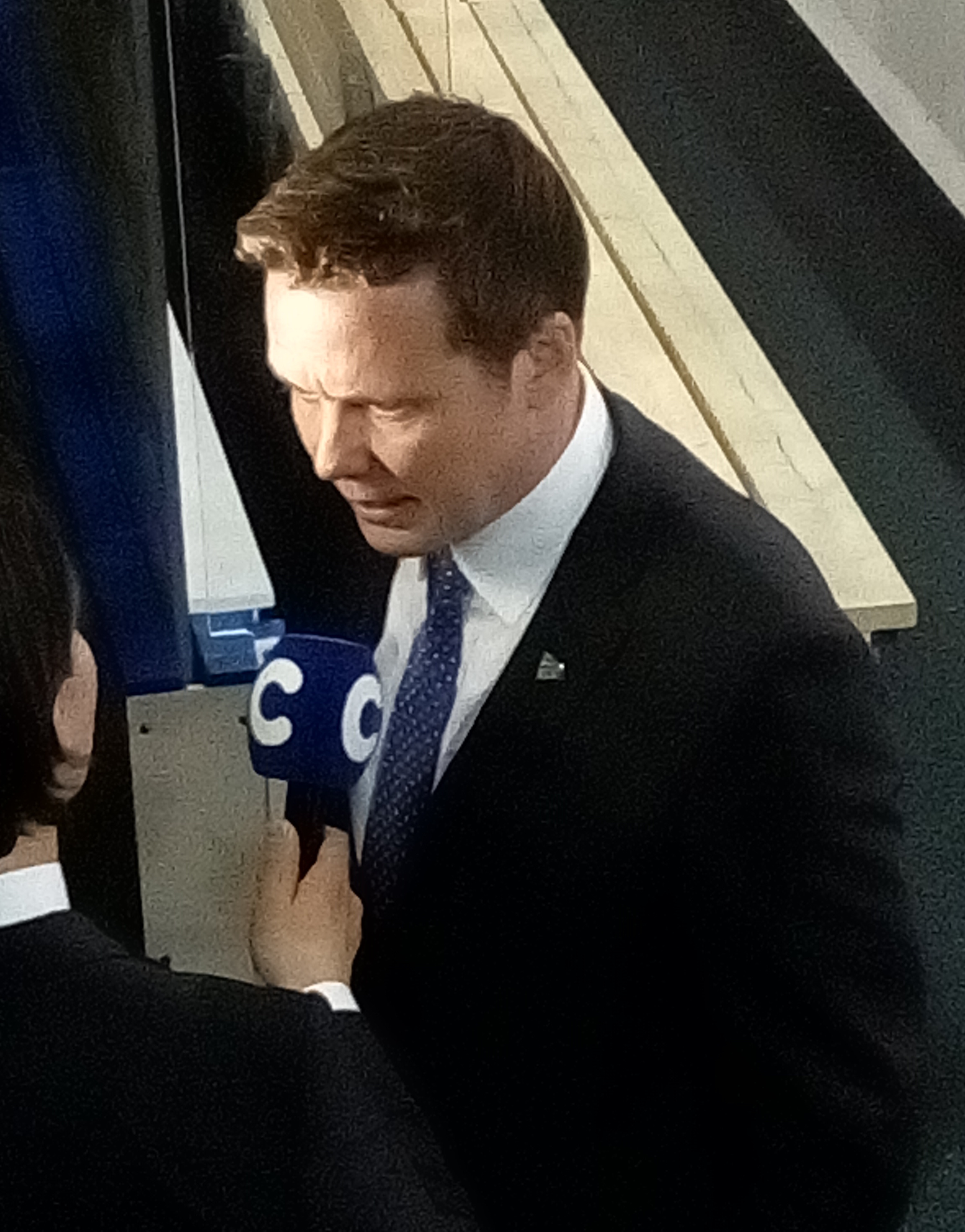
- Marjamäki while serving as the head coach of Team Finland at the 2017 IIHF World Championship.

Personal information
- Born: May 29, 1977 (age 49) Tampere, Finland
- Spouse: Sari Marjamäki

Sport
- Sport: Ice Hockey
- League: National League A
- Now coaching: EHC Kloten
Medal record (as assistant coach)
Ice hockey
Representing Finland
Olympic Games
Bronze medal – third place	2014 Sochi
World Championship
Silver medal – second place	2014 Belarus

Lauri Marjamäki (born May 29, 1977) is a Finnish ice hockey coach who currently serves as head coach of EHC Kloten of the National League A, a position he has held since 2022. He previously served as head coach of the Finnish national ice hockey team, and of the Espoo Blues of the Liiga and Jokerit of the KHL.

== Career ==
Marjamäki is notable for becoming a pro coach at a relatively young age, having only played a couple of seasons' worth of junior hockey semi-professionally before turning to coaching.

After working the youth ranks of Finnish clubs Ilves and Espoo Blues, he joined the coaching staff of the Blues’ men's squad as an assistant in 2007. In 2011, he was promoted to the head coaching job and remained in that position until February 2013.

Marjamäki took over the reins at fellow Liiga club Oulun Kärpät prior to the 2013-14 season and coached the team to back-to-back Finnish championships in 2014 and 2015. After grabbing the 2015 title, he won the Kalevi Numminen trophy as the Liiga Coach of the Year.

Marjamäki was head coach of the Finnish KHL team, Jokerit, 2018-2022. On February 24, 2022, Jokerit announced it would withdraw from the 2022 KHL playoffs due to the Russian invasion of Ukraine. Multiple team sponsors including the arena's title sponsor Hartwall announced intentions to end their agreements; the team's future participation in the KHL has yet to be determined. Three days later Oulun Kärpät announced that Lauri will return to the team and be the new head coach.

== National team coaching ==
Marjamäki was named as a Team Finland assistant coach under Erkka Westerlund for the 2014 Winter Olympics in Sochi, Russia and also served as an assistant coach at the 2014 and 2015 World Championships, winning silver in 2014.

Marjamäki was announced as the next head coach of the Finnish national team in August 2015 and he began in position in 2016, succeeding the previous head coach, Kari Jalonen. Team Finland’s first tournament with Marjamäki at the helm was the 2016 World Cup of Hockey, where the Finns placed last of eight. The team placed third in the 2016–17 Euro Hockey Tour and fourth at the 2017 IIHF World Championship in Cologne and Paris. In August 2017, Marjamäki announced that he would not take the +2 year option available in his contract, despite the Finnish Ice Hockey Association being open to the extension, and would leave the position at the conclusion of the 2017–18 season.

In his second season leading behind the bench, the team were champions of the 2017–18 Euro Hockey Tour, winning both the 2017 Karjala Tournament and 2018 Sweden Hockey Games and placing third at the 2017 Channel One Cup and a respectable second at the 2018 Carlson Hockey Games. At the men's ice hockey tournament of the 2018 Winter Olympics, a loss to Canada in the quarterfinals prevented the Finns from progressing to fourth position or higher, ultimately placing sixth. The 2018 IIHF World Championship was Marjamäki’s last major tournament with the national team. Finland finished at the top of Group B, a group which included perennial heavyweights Canada and the United States, as well as recent silver-medal winners Germany. Despite early success, the Finns were again stymied in the quarterfinals, this time losing to Switzerland.

== Personal life ==
He is married to Finnish Olympic ice hockey player, Sari Marjamäki They have two children, a daughter (born in 2008) and a son.

== Awards and honours ==
=== Head coach ===
- SM-liiga Finnish Championship (gold) (2): 2014 with Oulun Kärpät, 2015 with Oulun Kärpät
- Kalevi Numminen Award (1): 2015
- Champions Hockey League (silver) (1): 2015–16
- SM-liiga Finnish Championship (bronze) (1): 2016 with Oulun Kärpät
- Euro Hockey Tour (gold) (1): 2017–18

=== Assistant coach ===
- Winter Olympics (bronze) (1): 2014 Sochi
- World Championship (silver) (1): 2014 Belarus
- SM-liiga Finnish Championship (silver) (2): 2008 with Espoo Blues, 2011 with Espoo Blues
