= Kari Jalonen =

Finnish ice hockey player and coach

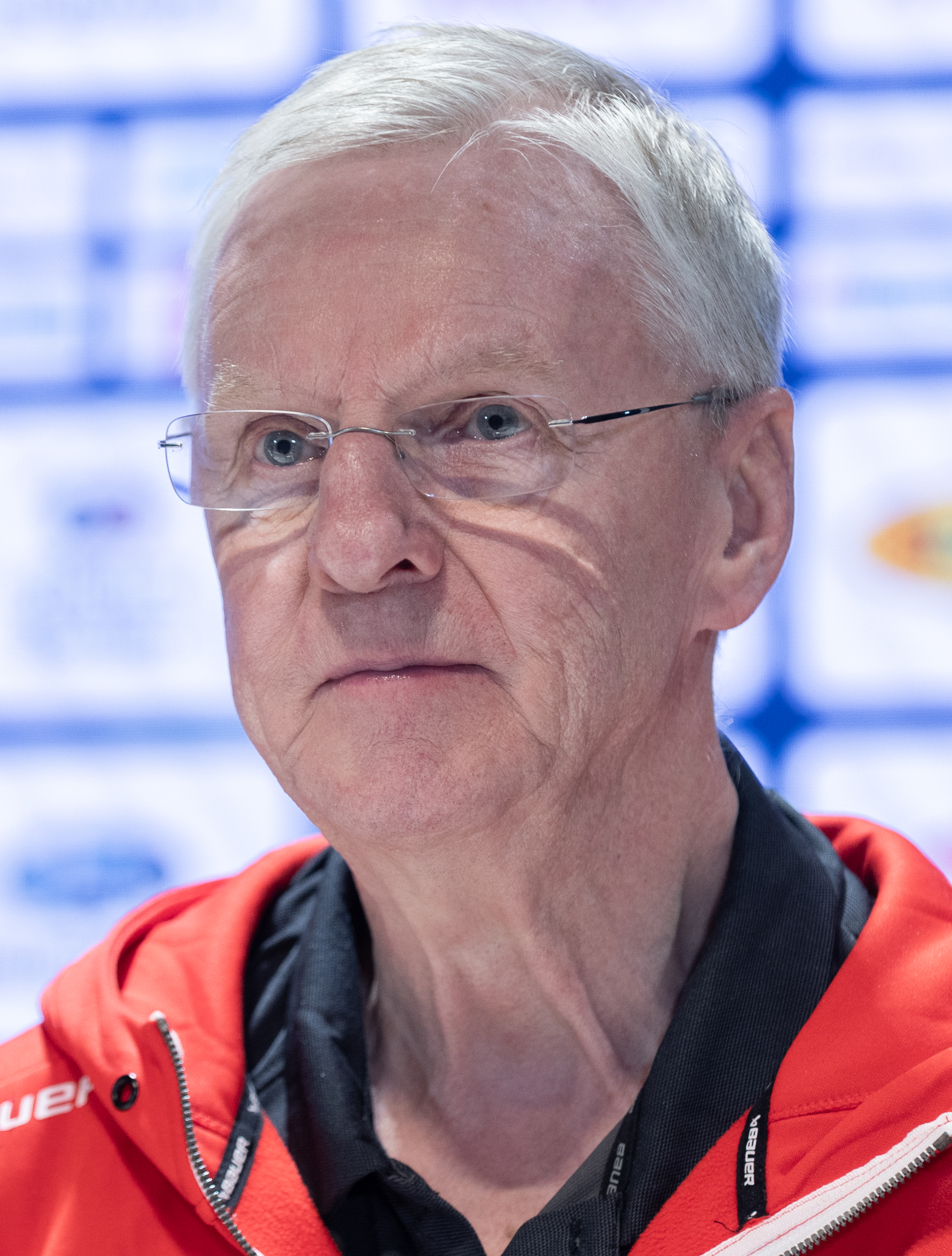
- Born: January 6, 1960 (age 66) Oulu, Finland
- Height: 6 ft 1 in (185 cm)
- Weight: 185 lb (84 kg; 13 st 3 lb)
- Position: Centre
- Shot: Left
- Played for: Kärpät; HIFK; TPS; Lukko; Junkkarit HT; Calgary Flames; Edmonton Oilers; Skellefteå AIK; Rouen HE
- National team: Finland
- NHL draft: Undrafted
- Playing career: 1978–1996

Medal record

Representing Finland

Men's ice hockey

European Junior Championships
Gold medal – first place	1978 Finland	

World Junior Championships
Silver medal – second place	1980 Finland	

Kari Jalonen (born January 6, 1960) is a Finnish professional ice hockey coach and former player. He was a former head coach of the Czech Republic men's national ice hockey team from 2022-2023. He is not related to Finnish ice hockey coach Jukka Jalonen.

== Playing career ==
A product of Oulun Kärpät, Jalonen played parts of two seasons (82-83, 83-84) at the NHL level, with the Calgary Flames and Edmonton Oilers. He made a total of 37 NHL appearances. He is best known for his time in the SM-liiga, but also had stints in Sweden (Skellefteå HC) and France (Dragons de Rouen).

Jalonen represented Finland internationally on nine occasions, including with the silver medal-winning 1980 World Juniors team and the bronze medal-winning 1986 European Championship team.

== Coaching career ==
After his playing career, Jalonen embarked on a career in coaching. Jalonen has coached successful SM-liiga teams TPS, Kärpät and HIFK. He has won four Finnish national championships as a head coach: three with Kärpät and one with HIFK. Jalonen also played for HIFK during his playing career. He received Liiga Coach of the Year honors in 2005 and 2007.

Jalonen started as the head coach of Torpedo Nizhny Novgorod in KHL from the beginning of the 2011–12 season and parted ways with the club during the 2012–13 season. During the 2013–14 season, he took over as head coach of fellow KHL team Lev Praha and guided the side to the Gagarin Cup finals, losing to Metallurg Magnitogorsk in seven games.

He was appointed head coach of Finland's national team in 2014. In April 2016, he was named head coach of SC Bern of the Swiss top-flight National League A (NLA). He guided the Finnish national team to a silver medal at the 2016 IIHF World Championships in Russia before stepping aside to take on the Bern job. He guided Bern to the Swiss championship in his first year in charge (2017) and also in 2019. On January 28, 2020, Jalonen was fired by SC Bern, following bad results. Hans Kossmann took over at the helm of the team. Bern was ranked 9th in the Swiss championship when Jalonen was sacked. In March 2022, Jalonen signed a head coaching contract with the Czech national team until May 2024.

Jalonen accepted a two-year contract to coach the Finnish U20 national team, covering the 2023 and 2024 IIHF U20 world championships.

Jalonen was named head coach of Kölner Haie of the German top-flight DEL league in 2024.

In 2025 was announced that Jalonen will become Tappara's new head coach starting in the 2026–27 season, when current head coach Rikard Grönborg returns to Sweden.

== Awards and titles ==
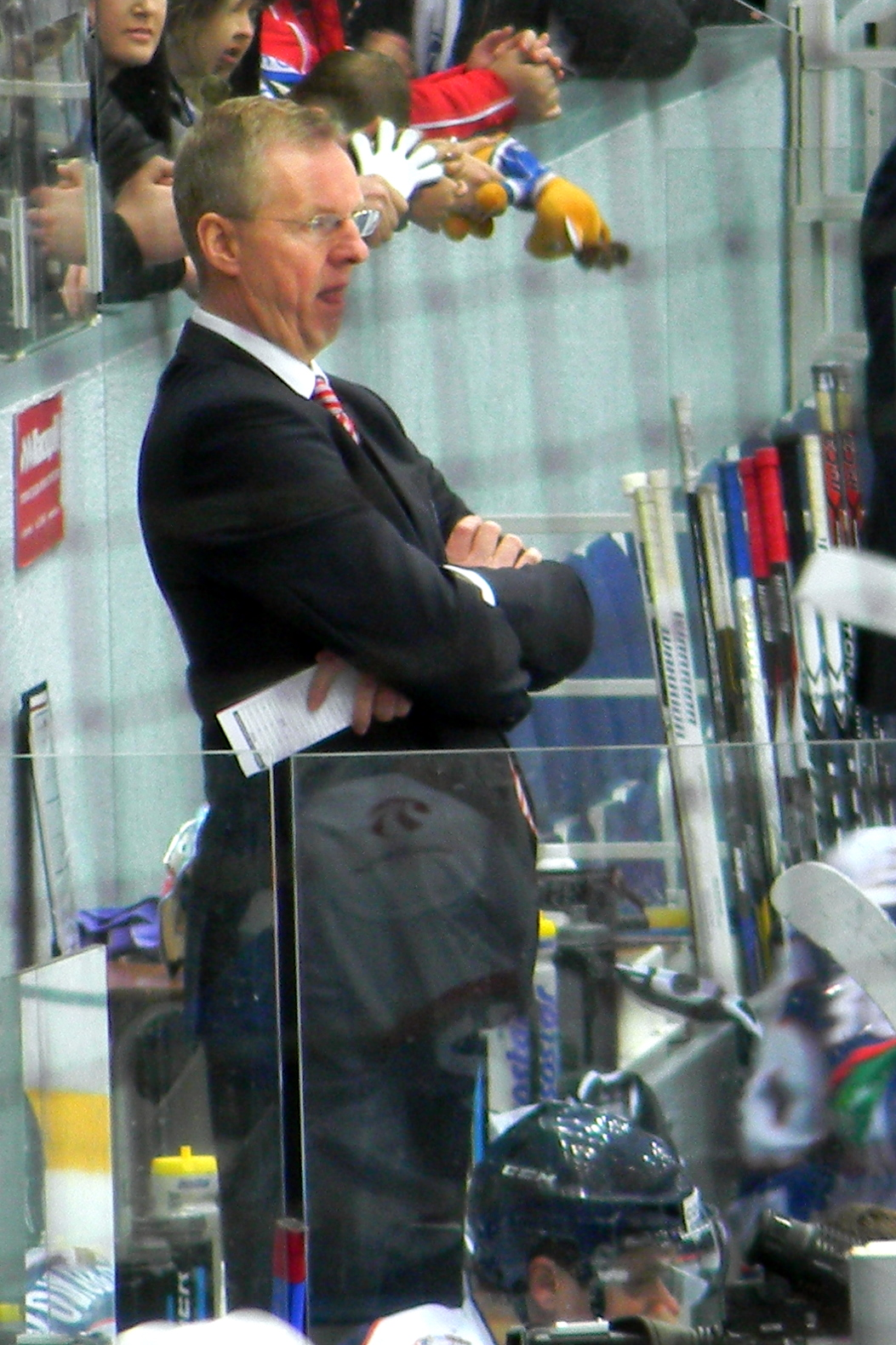
Kari Jalonen coaching Torpedo Nizhny Novgorod in KHL, 2011–12 season

=== As a player ===
- SM-Liiga champion, Kanada-malja: 1988–89, 1989–90, 1990–91, 1992–93
- SM-Liiga silver: 1986–87
- SM-Liiga bronze: 1979–80, 1983–84, 1988–89, 1993–94
- Jarmo Wasama memorial trophy winner: 1979
- Veli-Pekka Ketola trophy winner: 1987
- SM-liiga First All-Star Team: 1987, 1989
- IIHF European Cup silver: 1989–90
- Ligue Magnus champion: 1994–95
- Six Nations Tournament champion: 1995–96
- Ligue Magnus silver: 1995–96

=== As a coach ===
- SM-Liiga champion, Kanada-malja: 1998–99, 1999–00, 2000–01 (as assistant coach). 2004–05, 2006–07, 2007–08, 2010–11 (as head coach)
- Kalevi Numminen trophy winner: 2005, 2007
- KHL silver: 2013–14 (as head coach)
- Silver medal at IIHF World U20 Championships: 2001 (as head coach)
- Silver medal at IIHF World Championships: 2016 (as head coach)
- Bronze medal at IIHF World Championships: 2022 (as head coach)
- National League champion: 2016–17, 2018-2019 (as head coach)
- DEL silver: 2024–25 (as head coach)

== Career statistics ==
=== Regular season and playoffs ===
			Regular season					Playoffs
Season	Team	League	GP	G	A	Pts	PIM	GP	G	A	Pts	PIM
1976–77	Kärpät	FIN U20	24	21	10	31	32	6	4	3	7	6
1977–78	Kärpät	FIN U20	23	23	18	41	52	—	—	—	—	—
1978–79	Kärpät	SM-l	36	13	13	26	30	—	—	—	—	—
1979–80	Kärpät	SM-l	28	23	24	47	16	6	3	5	8	2
1980–81	Kärpät	SM-l	35	16	34	50	22	12	7	14	21	20
1981–82	Kärpät	SM-l	33	21	26	47	24	3	2	5	7	2
1982–83	Calgary Flames	NHL	25	9	3	12	4	5	1	0	1	0
1982–83	Colorado Flames	CHL	33	12	32	44	8	—	—	—	—	—
1983–84	Calgary Flames	NHL	9	0	3	3	0	—	—	—	—	—
1983–84	Colorado Flames	CHL	1	0	0	0	0	—	—	—	—	—
1983–84	Edmonton Oilers	NHL	3	0	0	0	0	—	—	—	—	—
1983–84	Kärpät	SM-l	14	6	15	21	17	10	5	12	17	10
1984–85	HIFK	SM-l	21	9	9	18	10	—	—	—	—	—
1985–86	Kärpät	SM-l	35	19	35	54	46	5	2	3	5	14
1986–87	Kärpät	SM-l	44	29	64	93	30	9	3	7	10	12
1987–88	Skellefteå HC	SEL	22	9	18	27	16	—	—	—	—	—
1987–88	Skellefteå HC	Allsv	16	9	15	24	17	5	5	4	9	6
1988–89	TPS	SM-l	44	18	56	74	40	10	4	14	18	8
1989–90	TPS	SM-l	37	19	31	50	12	9	5	8	13	10
1990–91	TPS	SM-l	26	4	22	26	18	9	3	4	7	2
1991–92	TPS	SM-l	44	10	21	31	8	3	0	1	1	0
1992–93	JHT	FIN.2	26	21	45	66	28	—	—	—	—	—
1992–93	TPS	SM-l	6	0	0	0	6	9	2	3	5	2
1993–94	Kärpät	FIN.2	28	21	46	67	22	—	—	—	—	—
1993–94	Lukko	SM-l	18	3	10	13	2	9	1	2	3	4
1994–95	Dragons de Rouen	FRA	23	16	18	34	4	8	5	13	18	4
1995–96	Dragons de Rouen	FRA	18	8	26	34	27	5	4	4	8	0
SM-l totals			422	190	360	550	281	94	37	78	115	86
NHL totals			37	9	6	15	4	5	1	0	1	0

=== International ===
Year	Team	Event	GP	G	A	Pts	PIM
1978	Finland	EJC	5	2	2	4	2
1979	Finland	WJC	6	3	3	6	2
1980	Finland	WJC	5	3	5	8	0
1981	Finland	WC	8	4	3	7	5
1981	Finland	CC	5	0	1	1	4
1982	Finland	WC	7	4	3	7	0
1983	Finland	WC	6	3	2	5	0
1986	Finland	WC	9	4	6	10	6
1987	Finland	WC	10	2	3	5	0
1989	Finland	WC	10	5	9	14	0
Junior totals			16	8	10	18	4
Senior totals			55	22	27	49	15

== Awards and honors ==
Award	Year
DEL
Coach of the year	2026

Preceded by Markku Kiimalainen	Winner of the Jarmo Wasama memorial trophy 1978–79	Succeeded by Pekka Arbelius
Preceded by Arto Javanainen	Winner of the Veli-Pekka Ketola trophy 1986–87	Succeeded by Esa Keskinen
Preceded by Kari Heikkilä	Winner of the Kalevi Numminen trophy 2004–05	Succeeded by Jukka Jalonen
Preceded by Jukka Jalonen	Winner of the Kalevi Numminen trophy 2006–07	Succeeded by Petri Matikainen
Preceded by Hannu Jortikka	Head Coach of TPS; 2001–03	Succeeded by Jukka Koivu
Preceded by Kari Heikkilä	Head Coach of Kärpät; 2004–08	Succeeded by Matti Alatalo
Preceded by Paul Baxter	Head Coach of HIFK; 2008-2011	Succeeded by Petri Matikainen
Preceded by Václav Sýkora	Head Coach of HC Lev Praha; 2013-2014	Succeeded by Team Folded
Preceded by Erkka Westerlund	Finland national ice hockey team Head Coach; 2014–2016	Succeeded by Lauri Marjamäki
Preceded by Lars Leuenberger	Head Coach of SC Bern; 2016-2020	Succeeded by Guy Boucher
Preceded by Filip Pešán	Czech republic men's national ice hockey team Head Coach; 2022-2023	Succeeded by Radim Rulík
Preceded by Uwe Krupp	Head Coach of Kölner Haie; 2024-2026	Succeeded by Thomas Berglund
Preceded by Rikard Grönborg	Head Coach of Tappara; 2026-	Succeeded by
