= Ville Koho =

Finnish ice hockey player

- Born: 27 February 1982 (age 43); Imatra, Finland
- Height: 5 ft 10 in (178 cm)
- Weight: 187 lb (85 kg; 13 st 5 lb)
- Position: Centre
- Shoots: Left
- SM-liiga team: SaiPa
- National team: Finland
- NHL draft: undrafted
- Playing career: 2001–present

Ville Koho (born 27 February 1982) is a Finnish ice hockey player who currently plays professionally in Finland for SaiPa of the SM-liiga. Serving as team captain, he has never represented any other Finnish team during his career which begun in season 2001–02.

== Career statistics ==
=== Regular season and playoffs ===
			Regular season					Playoffs
Season	Team	League	GP	G	A	Pts	PIM	GP	G	A	Pts	PIM
2001–02	SaiPa	SM-l	15	1	0	1	2	—	—	—	—	—
2002–03	SaiPa	SM-l	56	2	3	5	12	—	—	—	—	—
2003–04	SaiPa	SM-l	55	4	3	7	8	—	—	—	—	—
2004–05	SaiPa	SM-l	55	6	8	14	14	—	—	—	—	—
2005–06	SaiPa	SM-l	56	9	6	15	49	8	1	2	3	4
2006–07	SaiPa	SM-l	46	3	4	7	20	—	—	—	—	—
2007–08	SaiPa	SM-l	45	3	7	10	12	—	—	—	—	—
2008–09	SaiPa	SM-l	33	3	6	9	12	—	—	—	—	—
2009–10	SaiPa	SM-l	46	5	10	15	45	—	—	—	—	—
2010–11	SaiPa	SM-l	53	5	8	13	16	—	—	—	—	—
2011–12	SaiPa	SM-l	54	9	19	28	12	—	—	—	—	—
2012–13	SaiPa	SM-l	44	8	10	18	16	3	0	0	0	0
2013–14	SaiPa	Liiga	52	10	27	37	18	13	2	3	5	2
2014–15	SaiPa	Liiga	46	5	9	14	12	7	1	0	1	2
2015–16	SaiPa	Liiga	50	12	11	23	28	3	0	0	0	0
2016–17	SaiPa	Liiga	17	2	1	3	4	—	—	—	—	—
2017–18	SaiPa	Liiga	46	8	15	23	6	9	1	3	4	2
2018–19	SaiPa	Liiga	45	6	6	12	10	3	0	0	0	0
2019–20	SaiPa	Liiga	39	1	5	6	10	—	—	—	—	—
Liiga totals			853	102	158	260	306	46	5	8	13	10
