= Määttänen =

Määttänen is a Finnish surname. Notable people with the surname include:

- Pasi Määttänen (born 1972), Finnish ice hockey player
- Eveliina Määttänen (born 1995), Finnish track and field athlete
