= Jukka Rautakorpi =

Finnish ice hockey coach (born 1963)

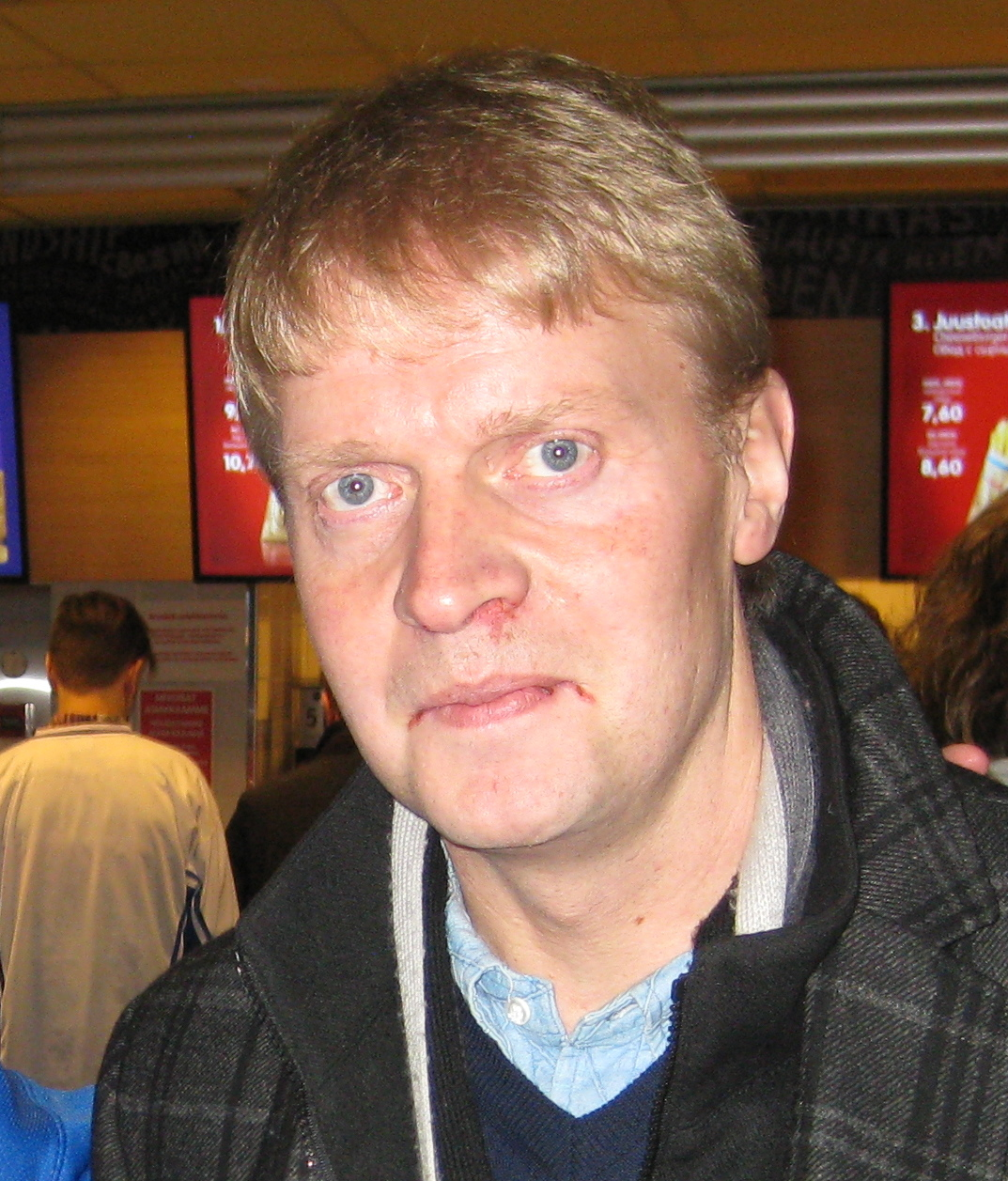
- Rautakorpi in 2016
- Born: December 17, 1963 (age 62); Kauhajoki, Finland
- Occupation: Ice hockey coach

Jukka Tapio Rautakorpi (born December 17, 1963, in Kauhajoki, Finland) is a Finnish ice hockey coach.

== Career ==
Shortly after his playing career ended, Rautakorpi began his coaching career starting out with the under-16 team of JYP Jyväskylä. After two years with the under-16 squad, he progressed to the under-18 team and then to the under-20 squad. In 1994–95 Rautakorpi moved up to become an assistant coach with JYP Jyväskylä on the SM-liiga squad.

Rautakorpi moved on to Tappara for the 1995–96 season for his first stint as a head coach in the SM-liiga. He stayed for 2 seasons coaching 100 regular season games for a record of 42 wins, 43 losses and 15 ties, both seasons Tappara lost in the playoff quarterfinals.

From 1997 to 1999, Rautakorpi coached various Finnish junior teams including the under-18 team at the 1998 IIHF European U18 Championship, winning silver, and the under-20 team in the 1999 IIHF World U20 Championship finishing 5th.

Tappara rehired Rautakorpi for the 1999–2000 season and he started his second run as Tappara head coach that would last 4 seasons this time. Rautakorpi had a much more successful tenure this time, amassing a record of 126 wins, 69 losses and 27 ties in 222 games. Under his tutelage, Tappara appeared in the 2000–01 and 2001–02 finals and won the Kanada-malja as playoff champion in 2002–03.

Rautakorpi spent 2 seasons as the head coach of Finnish club Lukko, leading the club to a record of 52 wins, 36 losses, 14 ties, 4 overtime wins (OTW) and 6 overtime losses (OTL). However, in his first season with the club, they lost in the playoff quarterfinals, and in the second, they lost out to HPK for third place in the playoffs.

Rautakorpi was back with Tappara again for the 2005–06 season, coaching the team to record of 28 wins, 15 losses, 5 OTW and 8 OTL, finishing 4th in the regular season but losing in the quarterfinals of the playoffs.

Rautakorpi did not coach the 2006–07 season, but signed for 2007–08 with Leksands IF of the Swedish HockeyAllsvenskan which marks the only time he has coached outside of Finland. Rautakorpi led Leksands to a 1st-place finish in the regular season which allowed them to play in the Kvalserien. The series could have led to a promotion to the Elitserien but they were unsuccessful, finishing 5th in the tournament, going back to HockeyAllsvenskan for the next season.

Finnish club HPK signed Rautakorpi to be their head coach for the 2008–09 season after a disappointing 2007–08 season, in which they did not make the playoffs. Rautakorpi was able to lead HPK to the playoffs again in 2008–09 finishing 3rd in the regular season but losing in the quarterfinal round of the playoffs. Rautakorpi remained with HPK for the 2009–10 season as well, leading HPK to a 5th-place finish in the regular season and all the way to the finals in the playoffs where they were defeated by TPS.

Rautakorpi was back with the Finnish under-18 team for the 2010–11 season. He coached them in the 2011 IIHF World U18 Championships finishing 5th.

After not coaching the 2011–12 season, Rautakorpi was back with Tappara again for the 2012–13 season. In his first season back with Tappara, he led the team to a 2nd-place finish in the regular season and all the way to the finals in the playoffs, but were defeated by Ässät for the championship.

== Career coaching statistics ==
=== Regular season and playoffs ===
Year	Team	League	Regular season								Postseason
Year	Team	League	GP	W	L	T	OTW	OTL	Pts	Finish	Result
1995–96	Tappara	SM-liiga	50	24	19	7	--	--	55	4th	Quarterfinal loss
1996–97	Tappara	SM-liiga	50	18	24	8	--	--	44	8th	Quarterfinal loss
1999–2000	Tappara	SM-liiga	54	31	15	8	--	--	70	3rd	Quarterfinal loss
2000–01	Tappara	SM-liiga	56	32	19	5	--	--	69	3rd	Final loss
2001–02	Tappara	SM-liiga	56	34	13	9	--	--	79	1st	Final loss
2002–03	Tappara	SM-liiga	56	29	22	5	--	--	65	5th	Champion
2003–04	Lukko	SM-liiga	56	24	18	14	--	--	65	5th	Quarterfinal loss
2004–05	Lukko	SM-liiga	56	28	18	--	4	6	98	5th	Bronze game loss
2005–06	Tappara	SM-liiga	56	28	15	--	5	8	102	4th	Quarterfinal loss
2007–08	Leksands IF	HockeyAllsvenskan	45	33	6	2	3	1	108	1st	Promoted to Kvalserien
2007–08	Leksands IF	Kvalserien	10	4	5	0	1	0	14	5th	back to HockeyAllsvenskan
2008–09	HPK	SM-liiga	58	27	19	--	6	6	99	3rd	Quarterfinal loss
2009–10	HPK	SM-liiga	58	26	22	--	3	7	91	5th	Final loss
2012–13	Tappara	SM-liiga	60	29	17	--	7	7	108	2nd	Final loss
2013–14	Tappara	Liiga	60	31	14	--	8	7	116	2nd	Final loss
2014–15	Amur Khabarovsk	KHL	60	11	40	--	0	6	45	14th (East)	Did not qualify
Liiga (SM-liiga) totals			726	361	235	56	33	41	--	--	--

=== International ===
Medal record

Ice hockey

Representing Finland

IIHF European Junior Championships
Silver medal – second place	1998 Sweden	

Year	Team	Tournament	GP	W	L	T	GF	GA	Finish
1998	Finland U18	IIHF European Junior Championships	5	3	1	1	17	12	Silver
1999	Finland U18	IIHF World U20 Championship	6	3	3	0	25	20	5th
