= 2017–18 Euro Hockey Tour =

Tournament details
- Venues: 9 (in 8 host cities)
- Dates: 8 November 2017 – 29 April 2018
- Teams: 7

Final positions
- Champions: Finland (9th title)
- Runners-up: Czech Republic
- Third place: Russia
- Fourth place: Sweden

Tournament statistics
- Games played: 30
- Goals scored: 146 (4.87 per game)
- Attendance: 201,601 (6,720 per game)
- Scoring leader: (Russia) Nikita Gusev (9 points)

The 2017–18 Euro Hockey Tour was the 22nd season of Euro Hockey Tour. It started in November 2017 and lasted until April 2018. It consisted of Karjala Tournament, Channel One Cup, Carlson Hockey Games and Sweden Hockey Games.

According to the Swedish Ice Hockey Association, the EHT was not officially held in the 2017–18 season as the countries did not play the same number of games and did not play the same number of times against each other.

== Standings ==
Pos	Team	Pld	W	OTW	OTL	L	GF	GA	GD	Pts
1	Finland	12	8	1	1	2	37	25	+12	27
2	Czech Republic	12	6	1	0	5	32	31	+1	20
3	Russia	12	6	0	1	5	31	22	+9	19
4	Sweden	12	6	0	0	6	28	30	−2	18
5	Canada	6	2	0	0	4	11	16	−5	6
6	Switzerland	3	0	0	0	3	6	12	−6	0
7	South Korea	3	0	0	0	3	4	13	−9	0

Source: Euro Hockey Tour

== Karjala Tournament ==
The 2017 Karjala Tournament was played from 8 to 12 November 2017. Seven of the matches were played in Helsinki, Finland, one match in Örebro, Sweden, and one match in Biel/Bienne, Switzerland. The tournament was won by Finland.

Pos	Team	Pld	W	OTW	OTL	L	GF	GA	GD	Pts
1	Finland	3	3	0	0	0	10	6	+4	9
2	Russia	3	2	0	0	1	13	7	+6	6
3	Sweden	3	2	0	0	1	8	6	+2	6
4	Canada	3	1	0	0	2	6	8	−2	3
5	Czech Republic	3	1	0	0	2	8	12	−4	3
6	Switzerland	3	0	0	0	3	6	12	−6	0

Source: Swehockey

8 November 2017
Sweden	5–3	Czech Republic
Switzerland	2–3	Canada
9 November 2017
Finland	3–2	Russia
10 November 2017
Switzerland	3–2	Czech Republic
Canada	0–2	Sweden
11 November 2017
Switzerland	2–6	Russia
Finland	3–1	Sweden
12 November 2017
Russia	5–2	Czech Republic
Finland	4–3	Canada

== Channel One Cup ==
The 2017 Channel One Cup was played from 13 to 17 December 2017. The Czech Republic, Finland, Sweden and Russia with the new teams of Canada and South Korea participated in the tournament. Eight matches were played in Moscow, Russia, one match was held in Prague, Czech Republic. The tournament was won by Russia.

Pos	Team	Pld	W	OTW	OTL	L	GF	GA	GD	Pts
1	Russia	3	3	0	0	0	8	1	+7	9
2	Czech Republic	3	2	1	0	0	11	4	+7	8
3	Finland	3	1	0	1	1	6	7	−1	4
4	Sweden	3	1	0	0	2	7	8	−1	3
5	Canada	3	1	0	0	2	5	8	−3	3
6	South Korea	3	0	0	0	3	4	13	−9	0

Source: Swehockey

13 December 2017
Czech Republic	3–2 (OT)	Finland
Canada	4–2	South Korea
14 December 2017
Sweden	1–3	Russia
15 December 2017
Finland	4–1	South Korea
Czech Republic	4–1	Canada
16 December 2017
South Korea	1–5	Sweden
Russia	2–0	Canada
17 December 2017
Sweden	1–4	Czech Republic
Russia	4–3	Finland

== Carlson Hockey Games ==
The 2018 Carlson Hockey Games were played from 19 to 22 April 2018. Five of the matches were played in Pardubice, Czech Republic, and one match in Yaroslavl, Russia. Tournament was won by the Czech Republic.

Pos	Team	Pld	W	OTW	OTL	L	GF	GA	GD	Pts
1	Czech Republic	3	3	0	0	0	8	3	+5	9
2	Finland	3	2	0	0	1	10	7	+3	6
3	Sweden	3	1	0	0	2	6	11	−5	3
4	Russia	3	0	0	0	3	3	6	−3	0

Source: Swehockey

19 April 2018
Finland	1–3	Czech Republic
Russia	1–2	Sweden
21 April 2018
Czech Republic	3–1	Sweden
Russia	1–2	Finland
22 April 2018
Czech Republic	2–1	Russia
Sweden	3–7	Finland

== Sweden Hockey Games ==
The 2018 Sweden Hockey Games were played from 26 to 29 April 2018. Three of the matches were played in Stockholm, Sweden, two matches in Södertälje, Sweden and one match in Helsinki, Finland. Tournament was won by Finland.

Pos	Team	Pld	W	OTW	OTL	L	GF	GA	GD	Pts
1	Finland	3	2	1	0	0	11	5	+6	8
2	Sweden	3	2	0	0	1	7	5	+2	6
3	Russia	3	1	0	1	1	7	8	−1	4
4	Czech Republic	3	0	0	0	3	5	12	−7	0

Source: swehockey

26 April 2018
Finland	3–2 (GWS)	Russia
Czech Republic	1–3	Sweden
28 April 2018
Finland	5–2	Czech Republic
Sweden	3–1	Finland
29 April 2018
Russia	4–2	Czech Republic
Sweden	1–3	Finland
