= Erkka Westerlund =

Finnish ice hockey player and coach

- Born: 30 March 1957 (age 69) Pernå, Finland
- Position: Forward
- Played for: Jukurit (1978-1979); JYP (1980-1981)
- Coached for: JYP (1985-1988); Lukko (1989-1991); HIFK (1997–1999); Jokerit (1999–2001)

Erkka Westerlund (born 30 March 1957, in Pernå, Finland) was the head coach of the Finnish national men's ice hockey team. He was appointed head coach on November 1, 2004, and his contract ended in May 2007, after winning silver in Moscow's World Championship tournament. He followed Raimo Summanen as head coach of the national team.

== Career ==
Westerlund has coached several Finnish ice hockey teams in the SM-Liiga: JYP (1985–1988), Lukko (1989–1991), HIFK (1997–1999) and Jokerit (1999–2001). During his coaching career Westerlund has won the Finnish Championship once: 1998, with HIFK and finished twice in the second place, in 1999 and 2000. Internationally Westerlund coached Finland in four tournaments, receiving medals in three of them. He has won one Olympic Silver medal (2006) in Turin, one World Championship Silver (2007) and one World Championship Bronze (2006).

As a player, Westerlund was a forward. He played in the 1978/1979 season for Jukurit, in 34 games he scored 7 goals and gave 10 assists. In the 1980/1981 season he played for JYP. Here he played 23 games, scoring 3 goals and 1 assist.

Westerlund was a candidate in the 2023 election for Finnish Ice Hockey Association chairman but lost to Heikki Hietanen 26–6. He told reporters afterwards that he felt he lost the election because he "represented change" and that the committee was not ready for a cultural upheaval within the organisation.

His son Tomas coached Kiekko-Espoo in the 2022–23 season.

Preceded by first Head Coach	Head Coach of JyP HT; 1985-1987	Succeeded by Antero Lehtonen
Preceded by Matti Keinonen	Head Coach of Lukko; 1989-1990	Succeeded by Matti Keinonen
Preceded by Mike Eaves	Head Coach of HIFK; 1997-1999	Succeeded by Ismo Lehkonen
Preceded by Timo Lahtinen	Head Coach of Jokerit; 1999-2001	Succeeded by Raimo Summanen
Preceded by Raimo Summanen; Jukka Jalonen	Finland national ice hockey team Head Coach; 2005-2007; 2013–2014	Succeeded by Doug Shedden; Kari Jalonen
Preceded by Hannu Kapanen	Winner of the Kalevi Numminen trophy 1997-98	Succeeded by Hannu Jortikka
