= 2008–09 SM-liiga season =

2008–09 SM-liiga
- League: SM-liiga
- Sport: Ice hockey
- Teams: 14
- TV partner(s): Canal+, Nelonen

Regular season
- Best record: JYP
- Runners-up: Blues

Playoffs

Kanada-malja
- Champions: JYP
- Runners-up: Kärpät

SM-liiga seasons
- ← 2007–08 2009–10 →

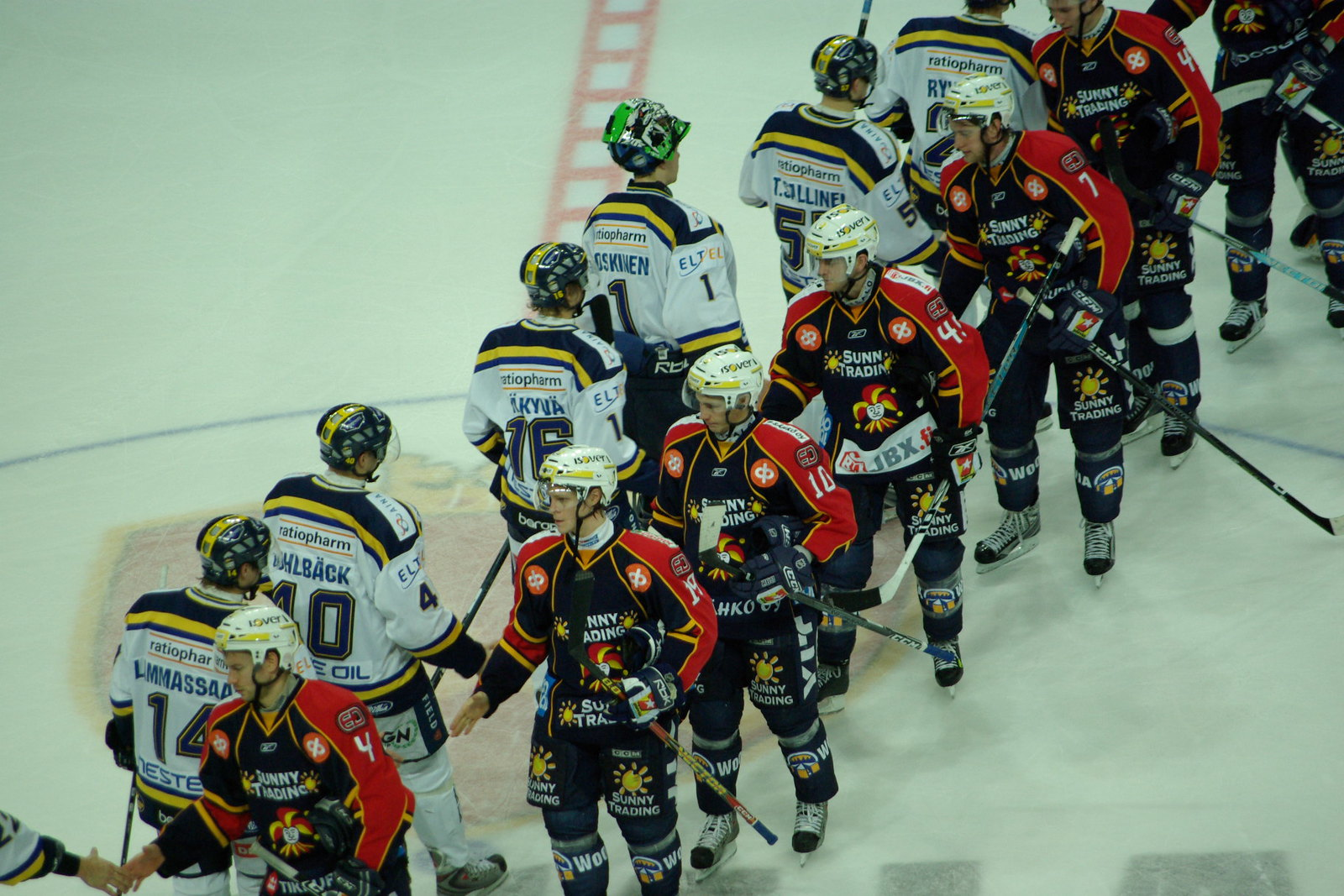
Jokerit against Blues in November 2008.

The 2008–09 SM-liiga season was the 34th season of the SM-liiga, the top level of ice hockey in Finland. 14 teams participated in the league, and JYP Jyvaskyla won the championship.

== Regular season ==
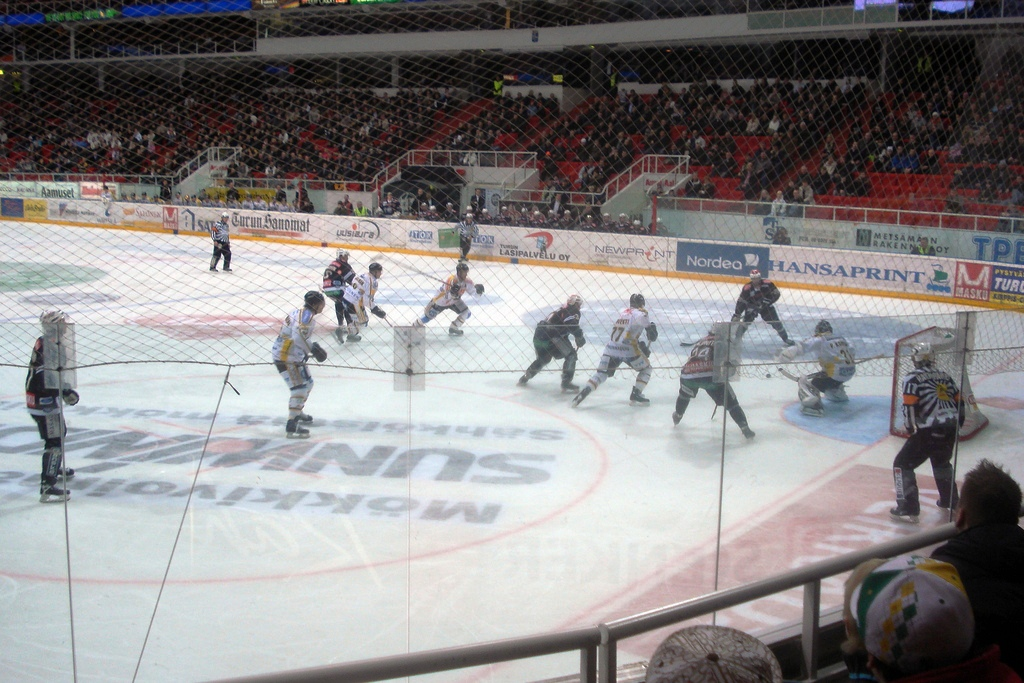
Kärpät against TPS in February 2009

	Team	GP	W	OTW	OTL	L	GF	GA	Diff	Pts
1	JYP	58	31	4	5	18	168	112	+56	106
2	Blues	58	28	4	8	18	159	135	+24	100
3	HPK	58	27	6	6	19	166	151	+15	99
4	Jokerit	58	28	4	6	20	134	132	+2	98
5	Kärpät	58	28	5	3	22	185	149	+35	97
6	KalPa	58	28	3	7	20	153	138	+15	97
7	HIFK	58	25	5	5	23	169	167	+2	90
8	Ilves	58	22	7	2	27	150	166	-16	82
9	Pelicans	58	22	5	4	27	149	145	+4	80
10	TPS	58	21	7	3	27	133	159	-26	80
11	Lukko	58	21	6	3	28	144	150	-6	78
12	Ässät	58	21	4	4	29	131	188	-57	75
13	Tappara	58	21	2	7	28	141	152	-11	74
14	SaiPa	58	17	4	3	34	136	174	-38	62

== Playoffs ==
=== Preliminary round ===
- HIFK - TPS 0:2 (1:3, 1:4)
- Ilves - Pelicans 1:2 (2:3, 1:0, 2:3)

=== Quarterfinals ===
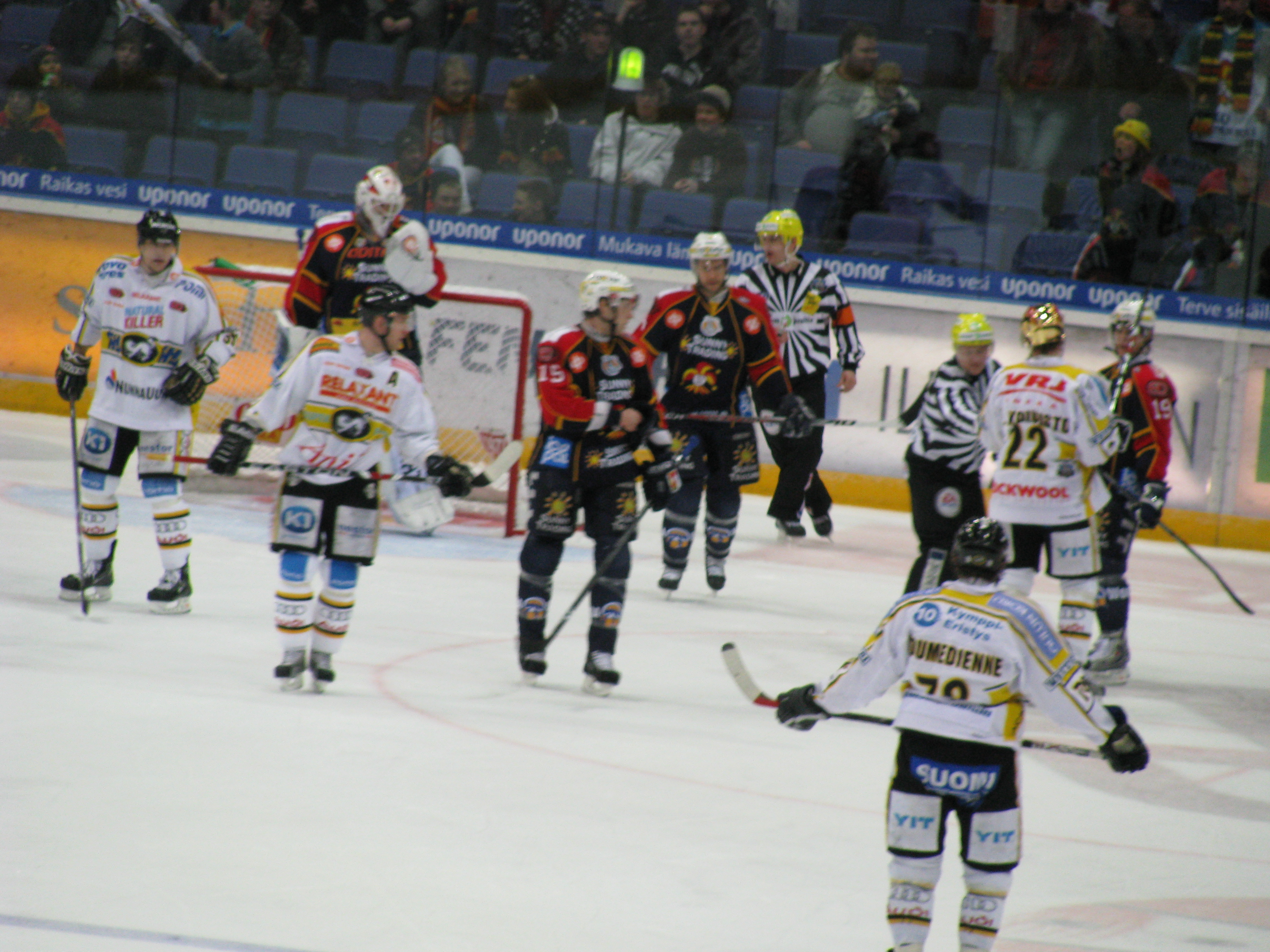
Jokerit - Kärpät on March 13, 2009

- JYP - TPS 4:2 (1:3, 2:1 P, 3:2, 1:2 P, 3:1, 4:2)
- Blues - Pelicans 4:3 (0:1, 4:3, 2:3, 4:3, 1:2 P, 7:2, 8:2)
- HPK - KalPa 2:4 (0:3, 3:1, 0:4, 1:2 P, 2:1, 2:3 P)
- Jokerit - Kärpät 1:4 (1:4, 2:3 P, 4:1, 1:6, 2:3 P)

=== Semifinal ===
- JYP - KalPa 4:1 (3:0, 4:1, 1:2, 2:1, 4:1)
- Blues - Kärpät 2:4 (3:2 P, 2:3, 2:3 P, 4:1, 5:7, 3:4 P)

=== 3rd place ===
- Blues - KalPa 1:2

=== Final ===
- JYP - Kärpät 4:0 (2:1 P, 1:0, 2:1, 5:2)

== Relegation ==
=== 1st round ===
- Lukko - SaiPa 0:3 (2:3 P, 2:5, 2:3 P)
- Ässät - Tappara 0:3 (4:5 P, 2:7, 2:4)

=== 2nd round ===
- Lukko - Ässät 3:1 (1:0, 1:0, 1:4, 3:1)

=== SM-liiga qualifier ===
Sport - Ässät 3:4 (3:2, 1:3, 0:5, 2:1 P, 4:3, 2:3 P, 0:3)
