= Tuomas Tuokkola =

Finnish ice hockey player and coach

- Born: January 20, 1970 (age 55) Alavus, Finland
- Height: 5 ft 9 in (175 cm)
- Weight: 165 lb (75 kg; 11 st 11 lb)
- Position: Defence
- Played for: Finland; KieHa; SiiHT
- NHL draft: Undrafted
- Playing career: 1995–1998

Tuomas Tuokkola (born January 20, 1970) is a Finnish former ice hockey defenceman. He is now retired from coaching. He is most famous from coaching KooKoo in the Finnish Liiga.

Tuokkola took over the head coaching duties for Ilves on January 21, 2013, as a mid-season replacement for Raimo Helminen.
