= Harri Rindell =

Finnish ice hockey player and coach

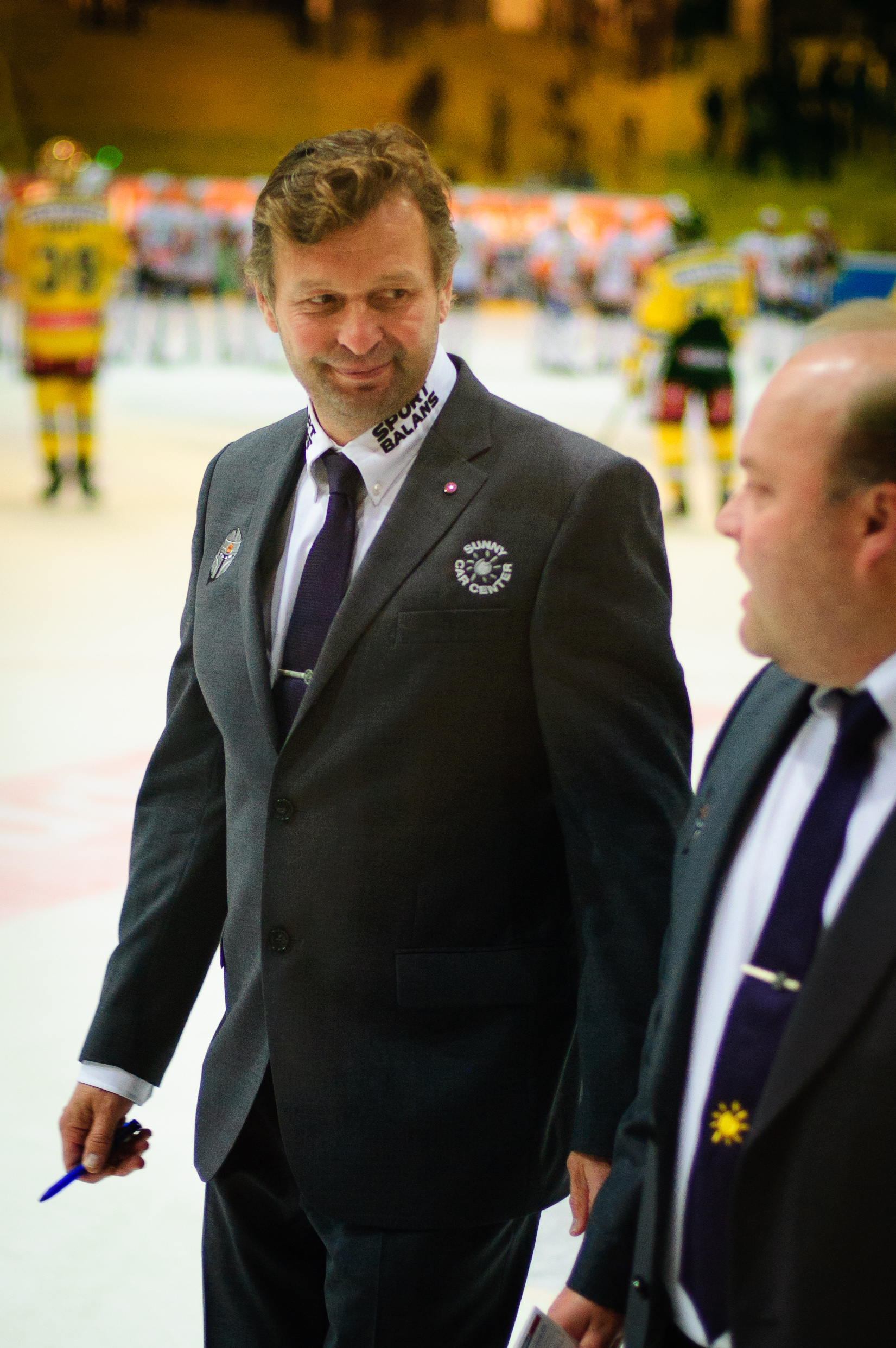
- Finnish ice hockey coach Harri Rindell of HPK Hämeenlinna during a game against SaiPa Lappeenranta in the Finnish SM-liiga.
- Born: January 17, 1954 (age 72) Helsinki, Finland
- Height: 6 ft 0 in (183 cm)
- Weight: 174 lb (79 kg; 12 st 6 lb)
- Position: Forward
- Shot: Left
- Played for: SM-liiga; HIFK
- NHL draft: Undrafted
- Playing career: 1974–1986

Harri Rindell (born January 17, 1954) is a Finnish former professional ice hockey player. Rindell took over the head coaching duties for HIFK in the Finnish Liiga on February 28, 2014 as a mid-season replacement for Raimo Summanen.

Rindell played three seasons in the SM-liiga, registering 18 goals, 17 assists, 35 points, and 22 penalty minutes, while playing 104 games with HIFK between 1975–76 and 1977–78.
