= Kari Heikkilä =

Finnish ice hockey player and coach

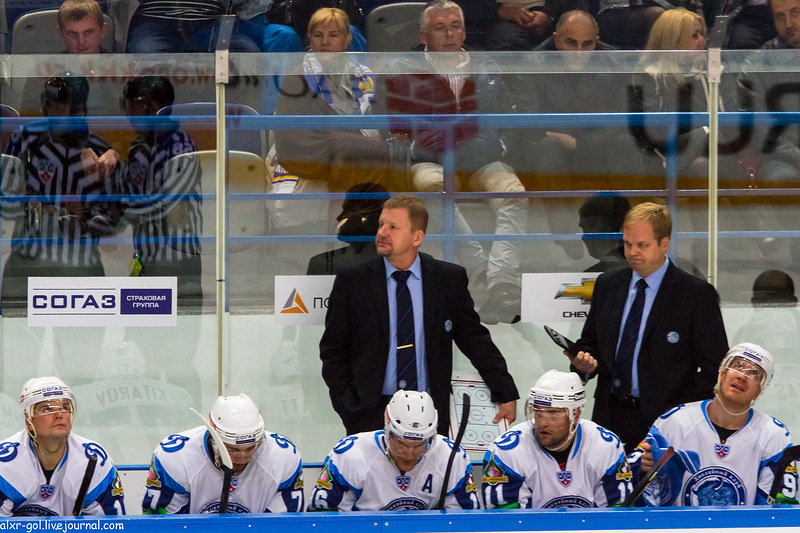
- Kari Heikkilä with Dinamo Minsk in 2012
- Born: 10 January 1960 (age 66) Kangasala, Finland
- Height: 181 cm (5 ft 11 in)
- Weight: 79 kg (174 lb; 12 st 6 lb)
- Position: Defense
- Shot: Left
- Played for: Calgary Wranglers; Victoria Cougars; Luleå HF; Vita Hästen; Ilves; HC Fassa
- Coached for: IF Sundsvall Hockey; Bodens IK; HPK; Vaasan Sport; Oulun Kärpät; Espoo Blues; Lokomotiv Yaroslavl; Metallurg Magnitogorsk; Dinamo Minsk; Neftekhimik Nizhnekamsk; Dinamo Riga; Ilves; Lukko; Saryarka Karaganda
- Playing career: c. 1978–1994
- Coaching career: 1994–2019

Kari Heikkilä (born 10 January 1960) is a Finnish former ice hockey player and coach.

He played majority of his career in Ilves, but had also stints in Sweden (HC Vita Hästen and Luleå HF) and in Italy, where he ended his career in 1994.

After that he started coaching. In SM-liiga he has coached HPK in autumn 1997 before being sacked, as well as Kärpät in 2001-04 and Blues in 2005–07. He won the championship with Kärpät in 2004 and got silver medal the year before.

He has also coached Lokomotiv Yaroslavl in Russia, with major success. In 2005 he coached them to bronze, in 2008 and 2009 to silver. On August 16, 2010, Kari Heikkilä signed three-year contract with the Belarusian Ice Hockey Association.
