= Juha Pajuoja =

Finnish ice hockey player

Juha-Pekka Pajuoja (born 31 March 1967, in Tampere) is a Finnish former ice hockey player and current coach. Pajuoja was the coach of the HC TPS in Liiga. He weighs 88 kg and is 178 centimeters tall.
