= Pasi Määttänen =

Finnish ice hockey player

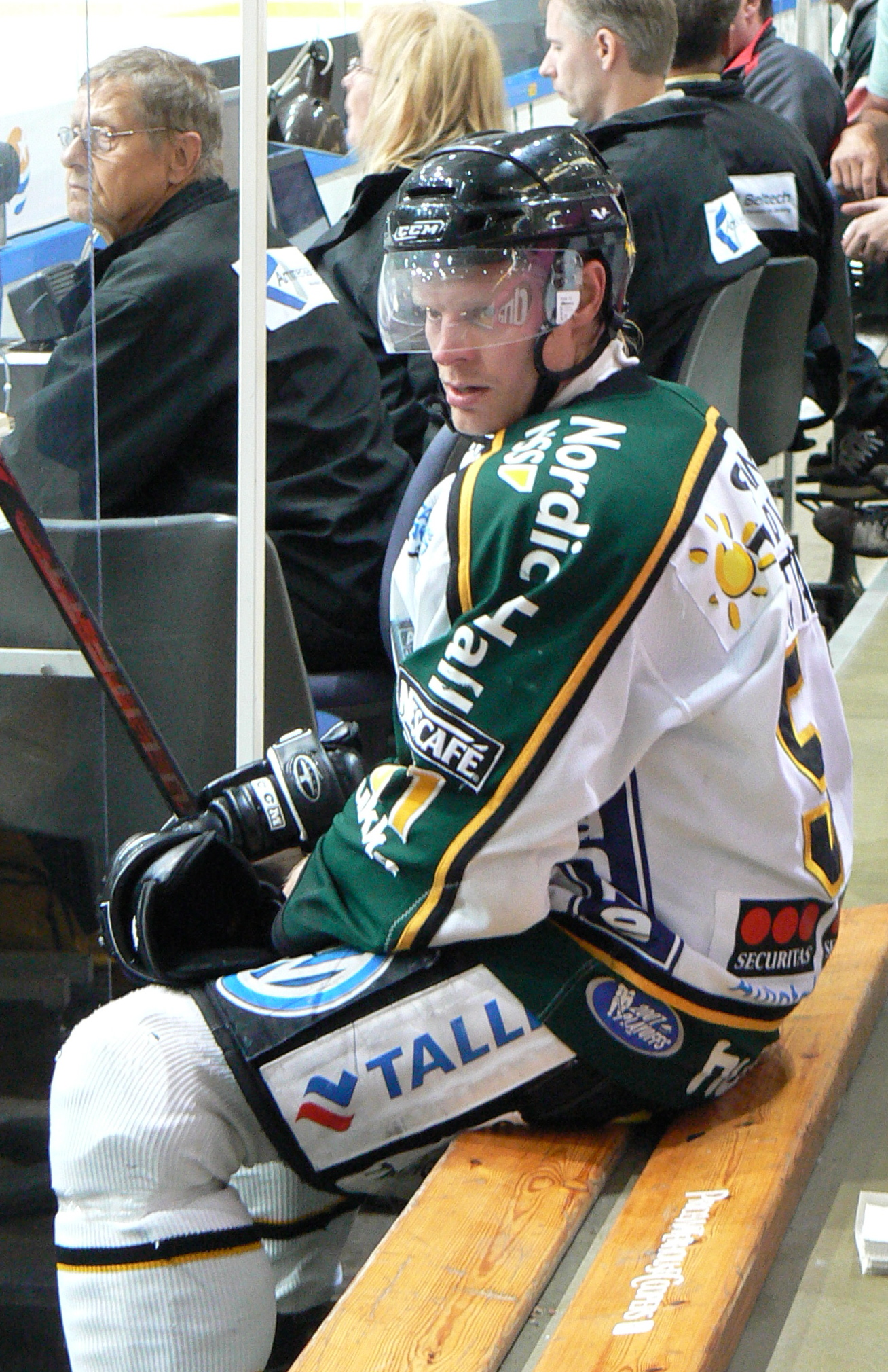
- Born: 11 June 1972 (age 52); Tampere, Finland
- Height: 5 ft 10 in (178 cm)
- Weight: 187 lb (85 kg; 13 st 5 lb)
- Position: Forward
- Shot: Left
- Played for: Ilves; Lukko; SaiPa; HPK; HV71
- NHL draft: Undrafted
- Playing career: 1991–2011

Pasi Määttänen (born 11 June 1972) is a Finnish former professional ice hockey forward who played in the SM-liiga for Ilves, Lukko, SaiPa, and HPK. He also played in the Swedish Hockey League for HV71.
