= Jyrki Aho =

Finnish ice hockey player and coach

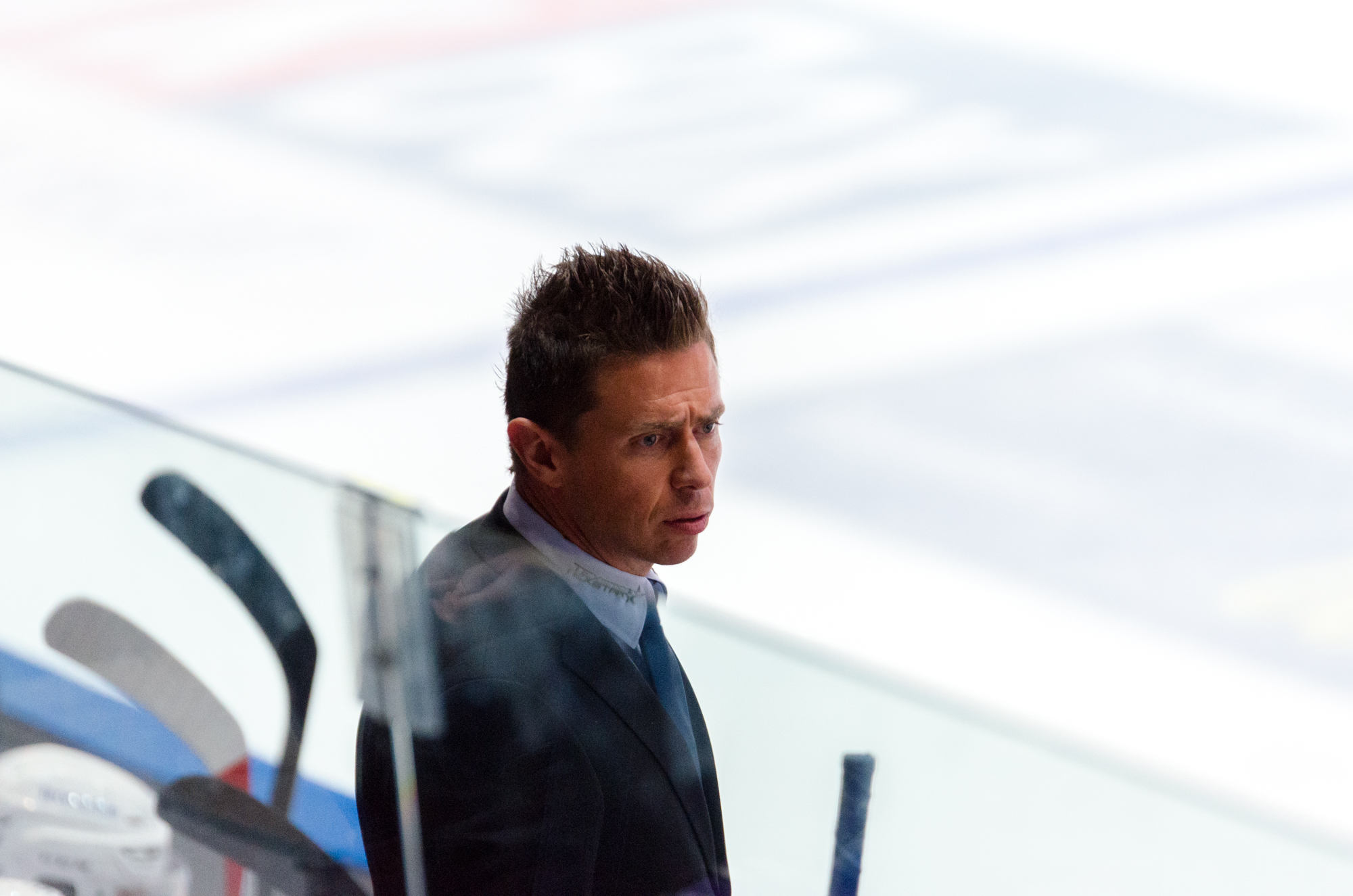
- Jyrki Aho on 20th of September 2014 in Kärpät - Blues match.
- Born: July 14, 1974 (age 51) Jyväskylä, Finland
- Height: 5 ft 11 in (180 cm)
- Weight: 187 lb (85 kg; 13 st 5 lb)
- Position: Defence
- Shot: Left
- NHL draft: Undrafted
- Playing career: 1995–2000

Jyrki Aho (born July 14, 1974) is a Finnish former ice hockey defenceman and the current head coach for the Finnish Hockey club of Kiekko-Espoo.
