= Hannu Jortikka =

Finnish ice hockey player and coach

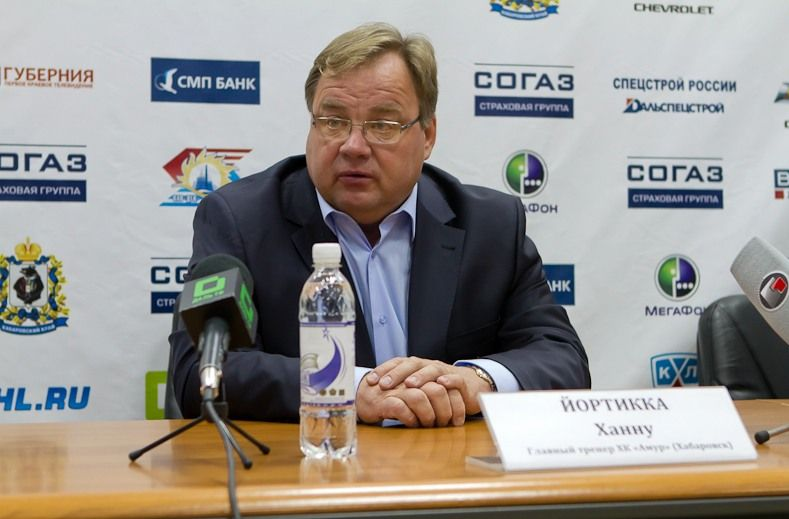
- Hannu Jortikka (2011)
- Born: 16 December 1956 (age 69)

Hannu Jortikka (born 16 December 1956) is a Finnish former ice hockey player and current coach.

Jortikka spent most of his playing career in TPS. He was a part of the championship-winning TPS team in 1976. He had to retire in 1983 due to injury.

Jortikka was the coach of the World Champion U20 national team of Finland in 1987, the tournament which is famous for the Punch-up in Piestany. He was then appointed as the assistant coach of the national team, which took Finland's first medal in men's level by finishing second in the 1988 Winter Olympics.

Jortikka is best known for his success in club teams. In 1988 he took over as the head coach of TPS, leading them to three successive championships. After being eliminated in quarter-finals in 1992, Jortikka was sacked and he signed with HPK. HPK went to the finals, but Jortikka was sacked before semi-finals after it was revealed that he had already signed for Swiss team SC Bern for the following season. He has also coached Malmö IF for two non-successive seasons.

In December 1995 he joined JYP as a mid-season replacement. JYP was placed last at that point and on its way to relegation games. Under Jortikka's short stint, the team escaped the relegation battle and ended the season as 10th out of 12 teams. He then regained his position as the coach of the U20 national team again but this time Finland failed to get a medal. In 1998 he returned to TPS, and led them to another triple, winning titles in 1999, 2000 and 2001. After that he took a two-season sabbatical from coaching.

Jortikka became the head coach of Jokerit in 2003 and coached them for two seasons. The first season was a disappointment with Jokerit being eliminated in quarter-finals but in 2004-05 Jokerit advanced to the finals. In the regular season their goaltender Tim Thomas made a record of 15 shutouts.

Jortikka once again returned to TPS for the next season but TPS was eliminated in the first playoff round in the following two seasons, therefore failing to reach the quarter-finals that were set as the goal for the season. For the 2009-10 season he started as head coach of Finnish U20 team but in late November he took over as head coach of Jokerit. Jortikka was replaced by Erkka Westerlund as Jokerit head coach in November 2010.

At the start of the 2011-12 season, Jortikka was appointed as the head coach of Amur Khabarovsk.

Jortikka was elected to the Finnish Hockey Hall of Fame in 2006 as a coach.
