= Risto Dufva =

Finnish ice hockey player and coach

- Born: May 1, 1963 (age 62) Jyväskylä, Finland
- Height: 6 ft 1 in (185 cm)
- Weight: 192 lb (87 kg; 13 st 10 lb)
- Position: Goaltender
- Caught: Left
- Played for: JYP Jyväskylä (SM-liiga)
- NHL draft: Undrafted
- Playing career: 1987–1991

Risto Dufva (born May 1, 1963) is a Finnish former professional ice hockey goaltender.

Dufva played with JYP Jyväskylä during the 1990–91 SM-liiga season.

Dufva took over the position of head coach for Lukko with the start of the 2012–13 SM-liiga season. Dufva later went on to coach Mikkelin Jukurit until resigning from the team. After a disappointing first half to the 18/19 season, JYP decided to hire Dufva as their new coach. He was hired as the head coach of Vaasan Sport of the Finnish ice hockey league (Liiga) during the 2019-20 season.
