= Toni Kähkönen =

Finnish ice hockey player

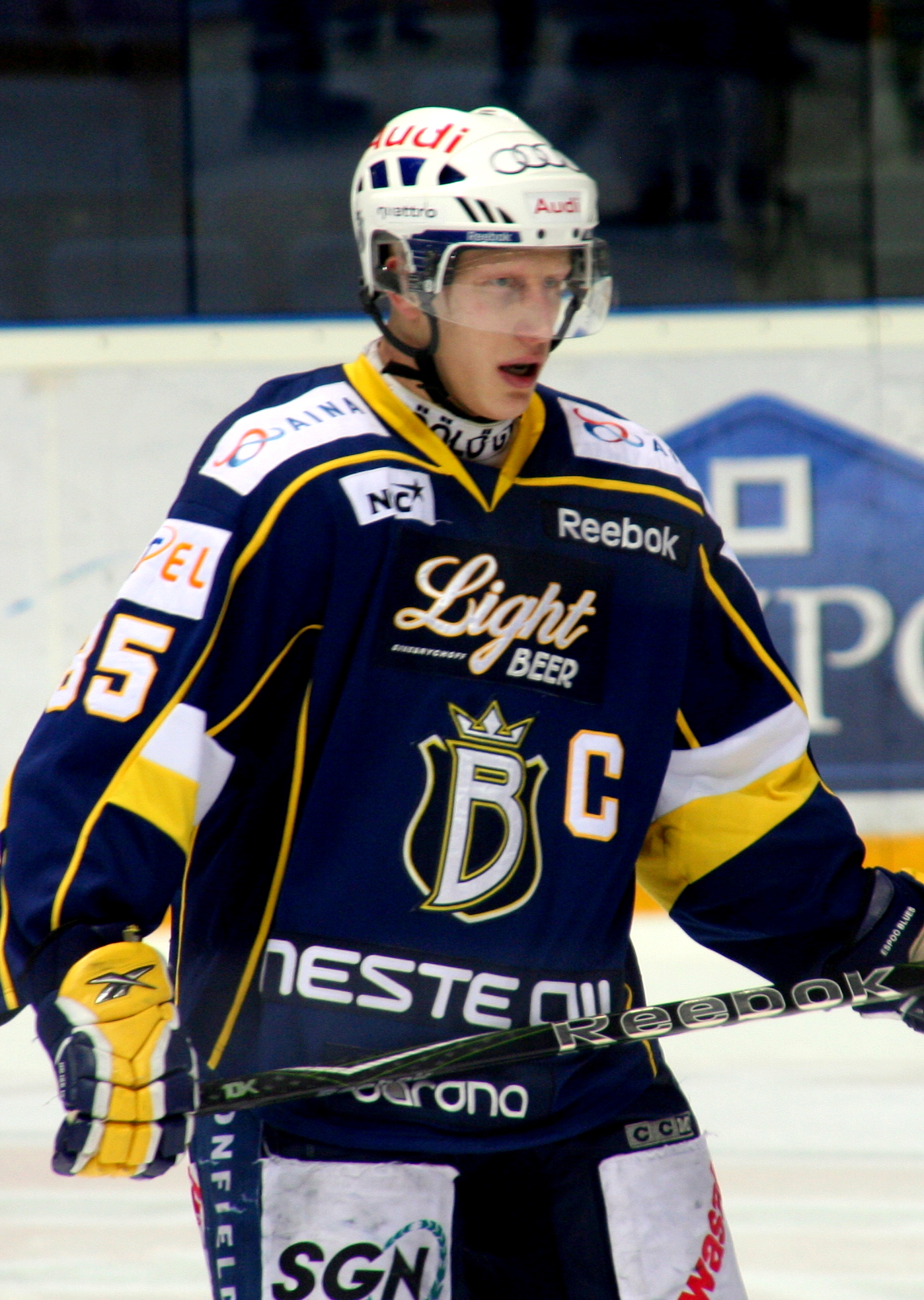
- Born: 26 September 1986 (age 38); Vaasa, Finland
- Height: 6 ft 0 in (183 cm)
- Weight: 187 lb (85 kg; 13 st 5 lb)
- Position: Forward
- Shoots: Left
- Liiga team Former teams: KooKoo; Espoo Blues; Oulun Kärpät; Leksands IF; Karlskrona HK
- Playing career: 2006–present

Toni Kähkönen is a Finnish professional ice hockey forward who currently plays for KooKoo in the Liiga. He previously played in his native Finland with Espoo Blues, where he served as captain, and Oulun Kärpät of the Liiga.

Fresh of a Finnish Championship with Kärpät in the 2013–14 season, Kähkönen signed abroad as a free agent in Sweden on a one-year contract with Leksands IF of the SHL on 5 May 2014.
