= Pekka Virta =

Finnish ice hockey player and coach

- Born: December 5, 1969 (age 55) Turku, Finland
- Height: 185 cm (6 ft 1 in)
- Weight: 94 kg (207 lb; 14 st 11 lb)
- Position: Forward
- Shot: Left
- Played for: SM-liiga; Lukko; HC TPS; TuTo; Ässät; BISL; Nottingham Panthers
- NHL draft: Undrafted
- Playing career: 1991–2001

Pekka Virta (born April 19, 1969) is a Finnish former professional ice hockey player and current head coach of SaiPa in the Finnish Liiga.

Virta played with six seasons in the SM-liiga, registering 51 goals, 42 assists, 93 points, and 272 penalty minutes, while playing 212 games with four teams between 1991–92 and 1997–98.
