= Petri Matikainen =

Finnish ice hockey player and coach

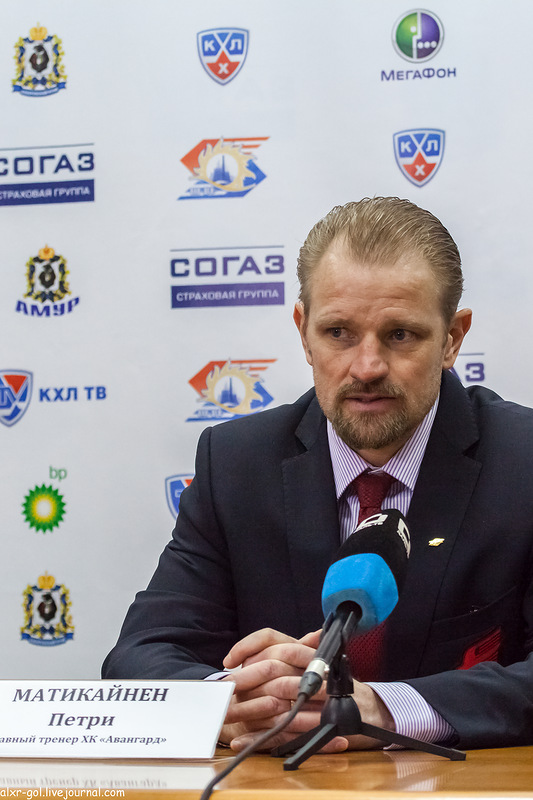
- Born: 7 January 1967 (age 59) Savonlinna, Finland
- Height: 6 ft 0 in (183 cm)
- Weight: 187 lb (85 kg; 13 st 5 lb)
- Position: Defense
- Shot: Left
- Played for: Oshawa Generals; Tappara; Jokipojat; KalPa; Berlin Capitals; Klagenfurter AC
- National team: Finland
- NHL draft: 140th overall, 1985; Buffalo Sabres
- Playing career: 1985–1999

Medal record

Representing Finland

Ice hockey

World Junior Championships
| Gold medal – first place | 1987 Czechoslovakia | |

Petri Matikainen (born 7 January 1967) is a Finnish former ice hockey player. He is currently working as the head coach of JYP Jyväskylä in the Liiga.

Matikainen was born in Savonlinna. Originally playing for SaPKo, he moved to play two seasons of junior hockey in Oshawa Generals. He was part of the team that won J. Ross Robertson Cup in 1987. In the same year, he also won IIHF World U20 Championship with Finnish team. He returned to Finland and played two years in Tappara, five years in Jokipojat and two years in KalPa. In 1996 he moved to play for Berlin Capitals. He also played for Klagenfurter AC before retiring in 1999.

== Coaching career ==
In 2003, he started his coaching career with Lahti Pelicans U20 team, and became head coach of their senior team in the following year. The team was not competitive and they ended last of 13 teams that year. He then became assistant coach of Blues in 2005 and spent two years as an assistant before being promoted as head coach in 2007. He was awarded Kalevi Numminen trophy in 2008 and 2010 after Blues got silver medals.

In 2010, he was chosen as an assistant coach of Finnish national team. The season 2011–2012 Matikainen coached HIFK Helsinki. In summer 2012 he signed a tree year contract to Avangard Omsk (KHL). In 2014 he signed a one-year contract to HC Slovan Bratislava (KHL). In the spring 2015 he signed a tree year contract to Lahti Pelicans.

Petri Matikainen moved to Austria to coaching EC KAC in 2018. Klagenfurter AC led by Matikainen, has won the Austrian League championship for the second time in a row.

In June 2023, EHC Biel announced him as their new coach for the 2023–24 season. He was fired in his first season with the team in February 2024, following bad results and complaints from the players about his coaching methods, attitude and lack of communication.

In March 2025, Matikainen returned to his native Finland, signing a contract for the remainder of the 2024–25 Liiga season with Oulun Kärpät. His tenure with Kärpät ultimately lasted only twelve days, consisting of five games, as the team failed to make the playoffs.

Matikainen was appointed as the head coach of JYP Jyväskylä for the 2025–26 Liiga season after signing a one-year contract with the team.

== Career statistics ==
| | | | Regular season | | | | | Playoffs |
| Season | Team | League | GP | G | A | Pts | PIM | GP | G | A | Pts | PIM |
|---|---|---|---|---|---|---|---|---|---|---|---|---|
| 1985–86 | Oshawa Generals | OHL | 53 | 14 | 42 | 56 | 27 | 6 | 1 | 4 | 5 | 13 |
| 1986–87 | Oshawa Generals | OHL | 50 | 8 | 34 | 42 | 53 | 21 | 2 | 12 | 14 | 36 |
| 1987–88 | Tappara | Liiga | 41 | 5 | 1 | 6 | 58 | 10 | 0 | 2 | 2 | 4 |
| 1988–89 | Tappara | Liiga | 44 | 4 | 13 | 17 | 32 | 8 | 0 | 0 | 0 | 10 |
| 1989–90 | Jokipojat | Liiga | 44 | 6 | 8 | 14 | 34 | 3 | 0 | 1 | 1 | 6 |
| 1990–91 | Jokipojat | I-Divisioona | 43 | 16 | 25 | 41 | 35 | — | — | — | — | — |
| 1991–92 | Jokipojat | Liiga | 42 | 4 | 8 | 12 | 38 | 5 | 3 | 1 | 4 | 10 |
| 1992–93 | Jokipojat | I-Divisioona | 42 | 20 | 21 | 41 | 51 | 6 | 3 | 2 | 5 | 2 |
| 1993–94 | Jokipojat | I-Divisioona | 45 | 13 | 41 | 54 | 46 | 5 | 3 | 1 | 4 | 6 |
| 1994–95 | KalPa | Liiga | 49 | 5 | 13 | 18 | 40 | 3 | 1 | 0 | 1 | 12 |
| 1995–96 | KalPa | Liiga | 50 | 5 | 11 | 16 | 36 | — | — | — | — | — |
| 1996–97 | Berlin Capitals | DEL | 44 | 4 | 7 | 11 | 63 | 4 | 0 | 0 | 0 | 8 |
| 1997–98 | Berlin Capitals | DEL | 24 | 0 | 8 | 8 | 14 | — | — | — | — | — |
| 1997–98 | Klagenfurter AC | EBEL | 26 | 2 | 2 | 4 | 77 | — | — | — | — | — |
| 1998–99 | Klagenfurter AC | EBEL | 50 | 4 | 10 | 14 | 102 | — | — | — | — | — |
| Liiga totals | | | 270 | 29 | 54 | 83 | 238 | 29 | 4 | 4 | 8 | 42 |
