= JYP Jyväskylä =

JYP
- City: Jyväskylä, Finland
- League: Liiga
- Founded: 1923
- Home arena: LähiTapiola Areena (capacity: 4,628)
- Colours: Red, black, white
- Owner: JYP Jyväskylä Oy
- General manager: Risto Korpela
- Head coach: Petri Matikainen
- Captain: Jere Lassila
- Affiliates: Boston Bruins
- Farm club: KeuPa HT
- Website: jypliiga.fi
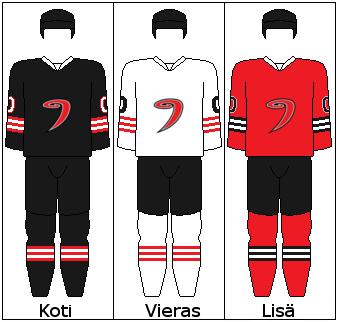

Franchise history
- 1923–1977: Jyväskylän Palloilijat
- 1977–present: JYP Jyväskylä

Championships
- Playoff championships: 2009, 2012

JYP is an ice hockey team playing in the Finnish top division Liiga. They play in Jyväskylä, Finland, at the LähiTapiola Areena.

== History ==
JYP was founded in 1923. First it was the ice hockey section of the sports club Jyväskylän Palloilijat The current full name of the club is, having been registered as an osakeyhtiö since 1999. JYP has won the Finnish SM-liiga twice, in 2009 and 2012, having been the losing side in the play-off finals in 1989 and 1992.

=== Early years ===
JYP was founded in 1923 as Jyväskylän Palloilijat (Jyväskylä's Ballsport players in English). Originally the club was multi-sport club having competitive departments in football, pesäpallo (Finnish baseball), bandy and later ice hockey and basketball. In 1977 JyP divided due to financial reasons and ice hockey department began with new club, JyP HT (officially Jyväskylän Palloilijat Hockey Team) while football department formed JyP-77 (JJK Jyväskylä nowadays).

The new club started in I Division, the then-second tier of Finnish hockey. JyP HT promoted to the top tier for the 1985–86 SM-liiga season. With ambitious aims, they were fifth after regular season and surprisingly eliminated out of play-offs by only two points. At the next season, the target was in play-offs but seventh place was not enough. When the beginning of the third season was disappointment, head coach Erkka Westerlund – subsequently Finnish national team coach – got sacked.

=== Partnership with the Boston Bruins ===
On 8 September 2010, JYP entered into a partnership agreement with the Boston Bruins of the National Hockey League (NHL), to enable player transfer and training between the two teams and their developmental systems.

== Players ==
As of 29 December 2025.

| No. | Nat | Player | Pos | S/G | Age | Acquired | Birthplace |
|---|---|---|---|---|---|---|---|
| 33 | (Finland) | Veeti Louhivaara | G | L | 20 | 2023 | Jyväskylä, Finland |
| 34 | (Finland) | Oskari Setänen | G | L | 32 | 2024 | Eura, Finland |
| 35 | (Finland) | Oskari Salminen | G | L | 26 | 2024 | Kotka, Finland |
| 41 | (Finland) | Otto Hannikainen | G | R | 20 | 2023 | Jyväskylä, Finland |
| 2 | (Finland) | Juuso Pulli | D | L | 34 | 2024 | Kouvola, Finland |
| 3 | (Finland) | Jonah Lehmus | D | L | 24 | 2024 | Lempaala, Finland |
| 4 | (Finland) | Väinö Liikonen | D | L | 25 | 2024 | Kouvola, Finland |
| 18 | (Finland) | Roni Jokinen | D | R | 22 | 2024 | Jyväskylä, Finland |
| 21 | (Finland) | Ossi-Veikka Vuontisvaara | D | R | 21 | 2024 | Jyväskylä, Finland |
| 21 | (Finland) | Tobias Winberg | D | L | 26 | 2025 | Helsinki, Finland |
| 31 | (Finland) | Eetu Peltola | D | L | 26 | 2021 | Helsinki, Finland |
| 42 | (Finland) | Teemu Eronen | D | L | 35 | 2023 | Vantaa, Finland |
| 44 | (Finland) | Sami Vatanen (A) | D | R | 33 | 2025 | Jyvaskyla, Finland |
| 63 | (Canada) | Trent Bourque | D | L | 28 | 2025 | Burlington, Ontario, Canada |
| 7 | (Denmark) | Alexander True | | L | 29 | 2025 | Copenhagen, Denmark |
| 9 | (Finland) | Tuukka Heiskanen | F | L | 20 | 2024 | Tampere, Finland |
| 14 | (Finland) | Mikko Perttu | C | L | 25 | 2022 | Järvenpää, Finland |
| 17 | (Finland) | Otto Mäkinen | C | L | 28 | 2024 | Tampere, Finland |
| 22 | (Finland) | Valtteri Aliranta | C | L | 22 | 2024 | Mänttä, Finland |
| 24 | (Finland) | Elias Huttu | F | R | 20 | 2023 | Jyväskylä, Finland |
| 25 | (Finland) | Pekka Jormakka | LW | R | 35 | 2024 | Jyväskylän maalaiskunta, Finland |
| 25 | (Finland) | Julius Korjus | RW | L | 25 | 2025 | Kellokoski, Finland |
| 28 | (Finland) | Jere Lassila (C) | C | L | 22 | 2022 | Jyväskylän maalaiskunta, Finland |
| 39 | (Finland) | Valtteri Ojantakanen | LW | R | 25 | 2024 | Helsinki, Finland |
| 40 | (Sweden) | Daniel Torgersson | LW | L | 24 | 2024 | Hono, Sweden |
| 61 | (Finland) | Santeri Huovila | LW | L | 22 | 2023 | Nurmijärvi, Finland |
| 71 | (Finland) | Juuso Puustinen (A) | RW | R | 38 | 2022 | Kuopio, Finland |
| 77 | (Finland) | Leevi Tukiainen | LW | R | 26 | 2025 | Lahti, Finland |
| 89 | (Finland) | Antti Tyrväinen | RW | L | 37 | 2025 | Seinajoki, Finland |
| 92 | (Finland) | Aaro Vidgren | RW | L | 29 | 2022 | Lohja, Finland |

Roster sources:. Captain and assistant captains source:

== Honours ==
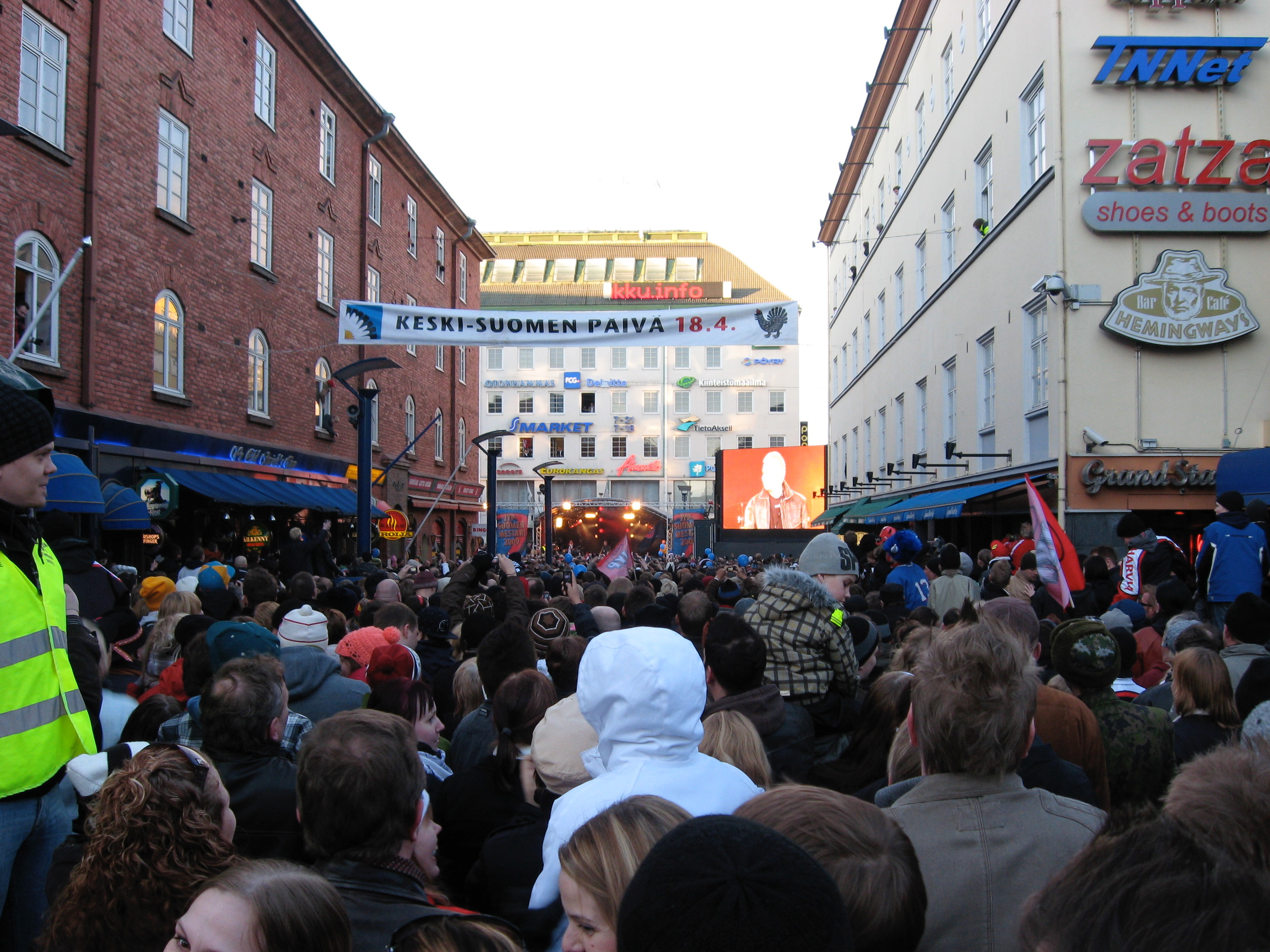
Matti Nykänen performs at the Jyväskylä after the JYP won the 2009 Finnish ice hockey championship

=== Champions ===
- (gold) SM-liiga Kanada-malja (2): 2008–09, 2011–12

=== Runners-up ===
- (silver) SM-liiga Kanada-malja (2): 1988–89, 1991–92
- (bronze) SM-liiga Kanada-malja (5): 1992–93, 2009–10, 2012–13, 2014–15, 2016–17

=== European titles ===
European Trophy:

- (gold) Winners (1): 2013

Champions Hockey League:

- (gold) Winners (1): 2018

== Notable players ==
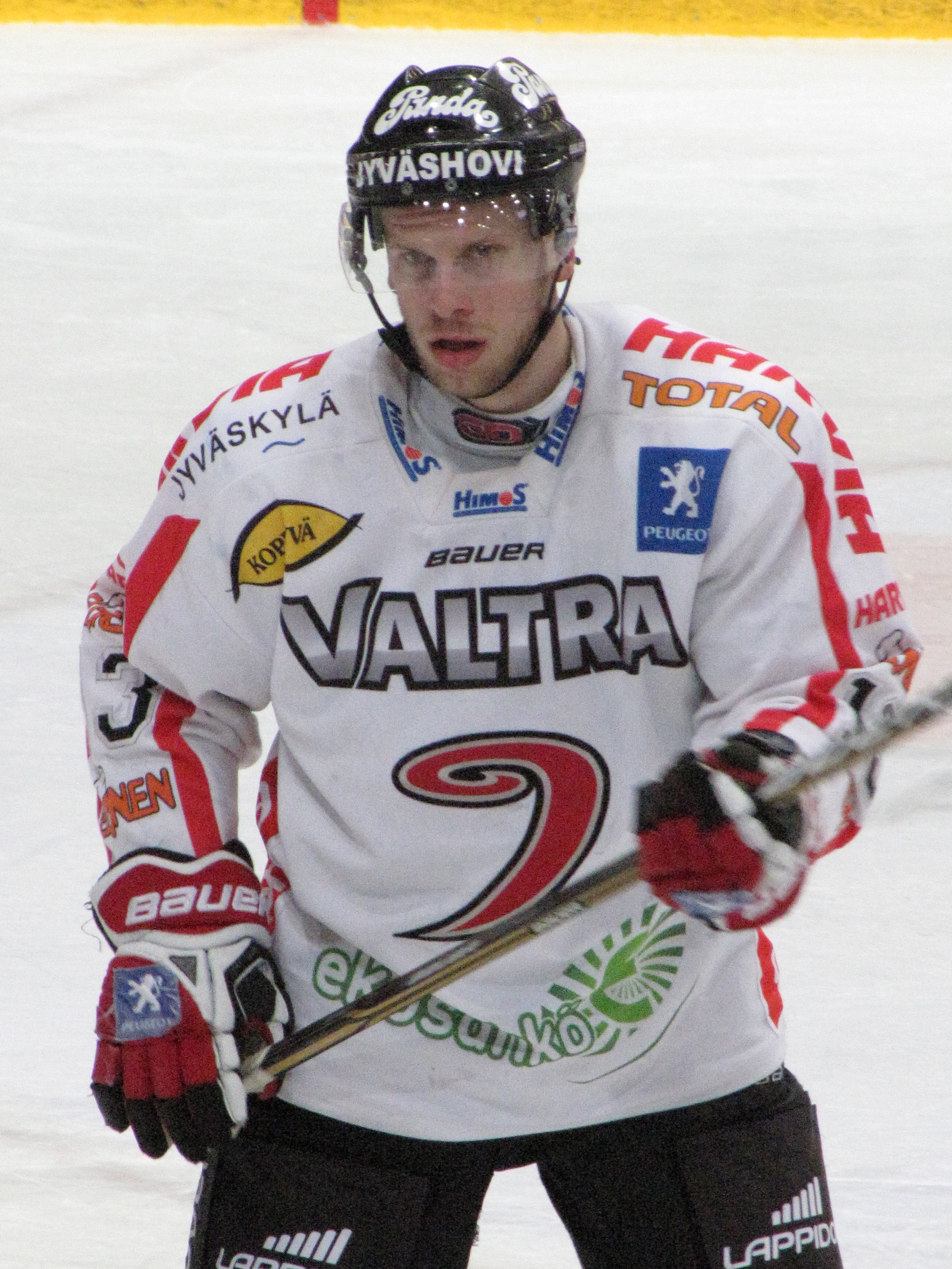
Filip Riska

- Jaroslav Bednář
- Dwight Helminen
- Juha-Pekka Hytönen
- Jarkko Immonen
- Steve Kariya
- Jari Lindroos
- Steve Martins
- Jyri Marttinen
- Michael Nylander
- Mika Noronen
- Rich Peverley
- Antti Pihlström
- Jody Shelley
- Pavel Torgayev
- Petr Ton
- Sinuhe Wallinheimo
- Duvie Westcott
- Robert Rooba

=== Honored members ===
- 1 Ari-Pekka Siekkinen
- 10 Pertti Rastela
- 13 Riikka Sallinen
- 19 Pentti Mikkilä
- 30 Risto Kurkinen
- 15 Juha-Pekka Hytönen

=== NHL alumni ===
- Yohann Auvitu
- Olli Määttä
- Joonas Nättinen
- Harri Pesonen
- Tuomas Pihlman
- Raimo Summanen
- Sami Vatanen
