= Toni Lydman =

Finnish ice hockey player (born 1977)

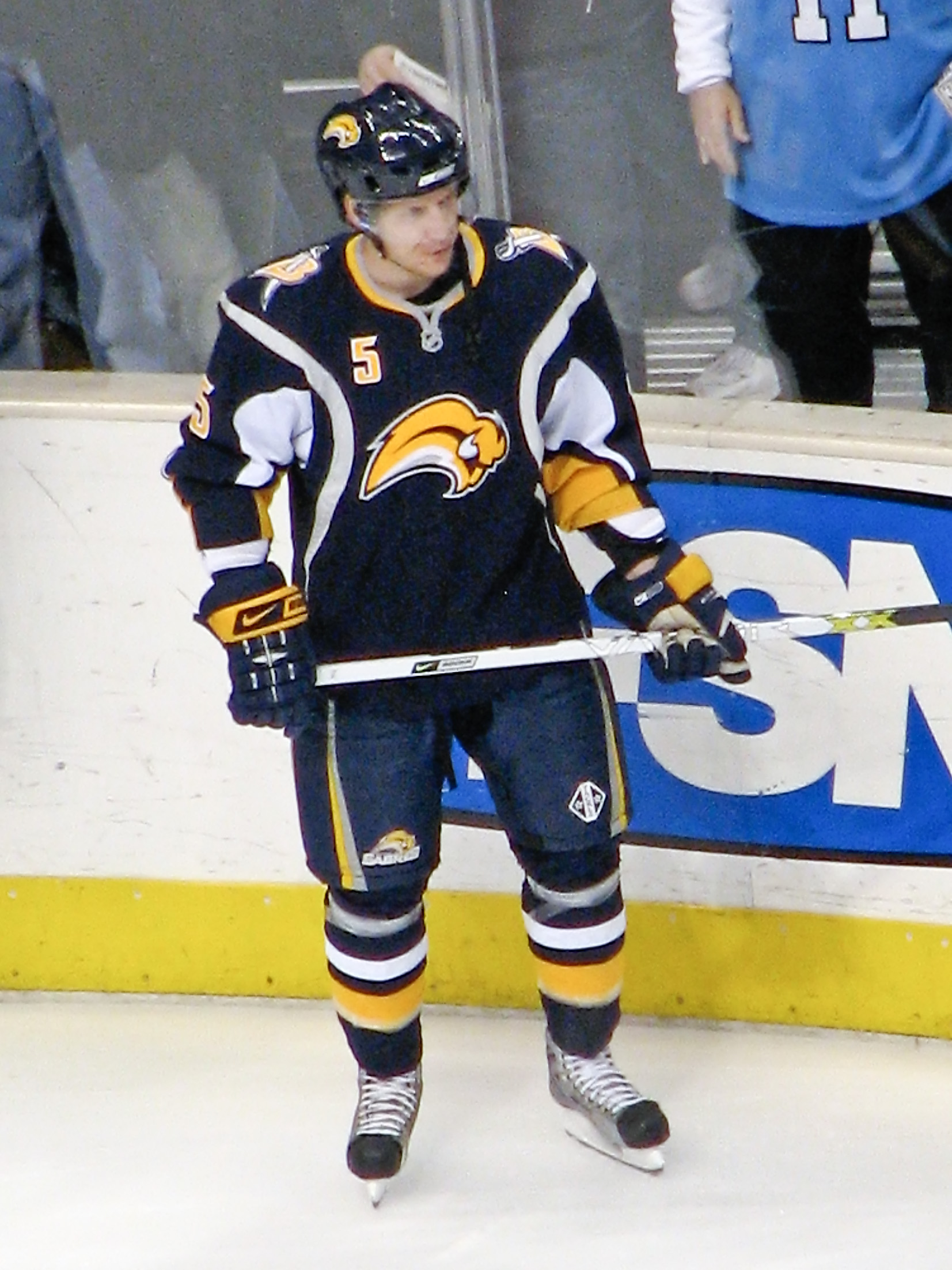
- Lydman in 2007
- Born: 25 September 1977 (age 49) Lahti, Finland
- Height: 6 ft 1 in (185 cm)
- Weight: 202 lb (92 kg; 14 st 6 lb)
- Position: Defence
- Shot: Left
- Played for: Tappara; HIFK; Calgary Flames; Buffalo Sabres; Anaheim Ducks
- National team: Finland
- NHL draft: 89th overall, 1996; Calgary Flames
- Playing career: 1996–2013

Toni Petteri Lydman (born 25 September 1977) is a Finnish former professional ice hockey defenceman. He first played competitively in his native Finland with Tappara, and HIFK of the SM-liiga before enjoying a lengthy career in the National Hockey League with the Calgary Flames, Buffalo Sabres and the Anaheim Ducks.

== Playing career ==
Lydman was drafted by Calgary in the fourth round, 89th overall at the 1996 NHL entry draft. He spent four seasons playing in Finland's SM-liiga for Tappara in Tampere and HIFK in Helsinki before making his NHL debut for the Flames in the 2000–01 NHL season.

His best season came in 2001-02, when he scored 28 points on 6 goals and 22 assists, tying for fifth for his team in assists and sixth in points scoring.

In the 2002–03 NHL season, Lydman led his defense in points with 26 and managed to remain injury-free the whole season, only missing one game due to illness. Calgary made it to the 2004 Stanley Cup Finals, but Lydman missed most of their playoff campaign due to injury.

During the 2004–05 NHL lockout, which wiped out the entire 2004–05 NHL season, Lydman returned to Helsinki for HIFK but only managed to play eight games.

On 25 August 2005, Lydman was traded from Calgary to the Buffalo Sabres for a third-round draft pick (John Armstrong) in the 2006 NHL entry draft,

In the 2007–08 season, Lydman had the 16th most hits in the league for a defenceman.

Having lost the Olympic final (2006), World Championship final (1998, 1999), World Cup final (2004) and Stanley Cup Finals (2004), Lydman and his fellow countrymen Jarkko Ruutu and Sami Salo (Kimmo Timonen also belonged to the club before winning the Stanley Cup at the end of his career (2015)), are the only members of the unofficial "Quadruple Silver Club", a somewhat humorous reference to the Triple Gold Club and the unofficial "Quadruple Gold Club" for players who have won the most important championships available to the sport.

On July 1, 2010, signed as a free agent with the Anaheim Ducks for $9 million over three years. His Ducks debut was delayed until mid-October because of problems with double vision.

After completion of the lockout-shortened 2012–13 season, in which he finished the season heavily concussed from a Justin Abdelkader hit in a playoff series loss to the Detroit Red Wings, Lydman retired from professional ice hockey and accepted a TV analyst role to cover Finnish ice hockey.

== Career statistics ==
=== Regular season and playoffs ===
			Regular season					Playoffs
Season	Team	League	GP	G	A	Pts	PIM	GP	G	A	Pts	PIM
1994–95	Reipas Lahti	FIN U18	9	7	4	11	12	—	—	—	—	—
1994–95	Reipas Lahti	FIN.2 U20	26	6	4	10	10	—	—	—	—	—
1995–96	Reipas Lahti	FIN.2 U20	8	2	2	4	6	—	—	—	—	—
1995–96	Reipas Lahti	FIN.2	39	5	2	7	30	3	0	1	1	0
1996–97	Tappara	SM-l	49	1	2	3	65	3	0	0	0	6
1997–98	Tappara	SM-l	48	4	10	14	48	4	0	2	2	0
1998–99	HIFK	SM-l	42	4	7	11	36	11	0	3	3	2
1999–2000	HIFK	SM-l	46	4	18	22	36	9	0	4	4	6
2000–01	Calgary Flames	NHL	62	3	16	19	30	—	—	—	—	—
2001–02	Calgary Flames	NHL	79	6	22	28	52	—	—	—	—	—
2002–03	Calgary Flames	NHL	81	6	20	26	28	—	—	—	—	—
2003–04	Calgary Flames	NHL	67	4	16	20	30	6	0	1	1	2
2004–05	HIFK	SM-l	8	1	2	3	2	5	0	3	3	0
2005–06	Buffalo Sabres	NHL	75	1	16	17	82	18	1	4	5	18
2006–07	Buffalo Sabres	NHL	67	2	17	19	55	16	2	2	4	14
2007–08	Buffalo Sabres	NHL	82	4	22	26	74	—	—	—	—	—
2008–09	Buffalo Sabres	NHL	80	3	20	23	70	—	—	—	—	—
2009–10	Buffalo Sabres	NHL	67	4	16	20	30	6	0	1	1	6
2010–11	Anaheim Ducks	NHL	78	3	22	25	42	6	0	0	0	2
2011–12	Anaheim Ducks	NHL	74	0	13	13	46	—	—	—	—	—
2012–13	Anaheim Ducks	NHL	35	0	6	6	12	3	0	0	0	0
SM-l totals			193	14	39	53	187	32	0	12	12	14
NHL totals			847	36	206	242	551	55	3	8	11	42

=== International ===
Year	Team	Event	Result	GP	G	A	Pts	PIM
1995	Finland	EJC18	1st place, gold medalist(s)	5	2	3	5	2
1996	Finland	WJC	6th	6	0	2	2	6
1997	Finland	WJC	5th	6	2	0	2	6
1998	Finland	WC	2nd place, silver medalist(s)	10	0	1	1	31
1999	Finland	WC	2nd place, silver medalist(s)	10	0	0	0	4
2000	Finland	WC	3rd place, bronze medalist(s)	9	1	0	1	12
2002	Finland	WC	4th	9	1	1	2	0
2003	Finland	WC	5th	7	2	1	3	6
2004	Finland	WCH	2nd place, silver medalist(s)	6	0	3	3	6
2006	Finland	OG	2nd place, silver medalist(s)	8	1	0	1	10
2010	Finland	OG	3rd place, bronze medalist(s)	6	0	0	0	2
Junior totals				17	4	5	9	14
Senior totals				65	5	6	11	71

== Awards ==
- Pekka Rautakallio trophy for best defenceman in the SM-liiga - 2000
- Silver Medal Winner at the 2006 Winter Olympics in Men's Ice Hockey
- Bronze Medal Winner at the 2010 Winter Olympics in Men's Ice Hockey

Awards and achievements
Preceded by Brian Rafalski	Winner of the Pekka Rautakallio trophy 1999–00	Succeeded by Jouni Loponen
Preceded by Jochen Hecht	Buffalo Sabres captain November 2007	Succeeded by Brian Campbell
