= Tom Koivisto =

Finnish ice hockey player

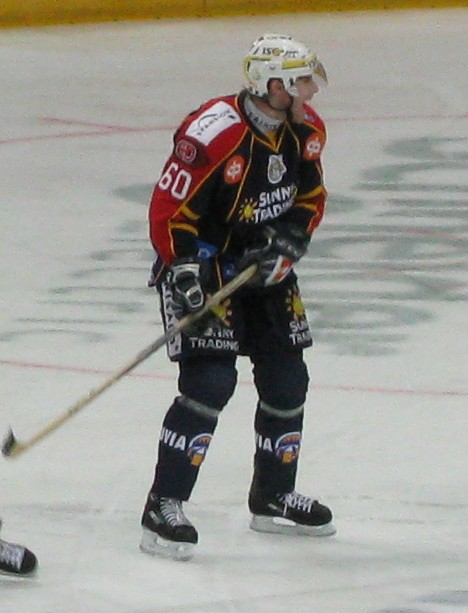
- Born: 4 June 1974 (age 51) Turku, Finland
- Height: 5 ft 10 in (178 cm)
- Weight: 181 lb (82 kg; 12 st 13 lb)
- Position: Defence
- Shot: Right
- SM-liiga team Former teams: Jokerit; TPS; HPK; St. Louis Blues; Frölunda HC; Rapperswil-Jona Lakers
- National team: Finland
- NHL draft: 253rd overall, 2002; St. Louis Blues
- Playing career: 1993–2012

Tom Koivisto (born 4 June 1974) is a Finnish former professional ice hockey defenceman who last played for Jokerit in the SM-liiga. He was drafted by the St. Louis Blues as their eighth-round pick, 253rd overall, in the 2002 NHL entry draft. He played parts of ten seasons in the SM-liiga before coming to North America in 2002. Koivisto spent most of two seasons in the American Hockey League but appeared in 22 National Hockey League games with the Blues in 2002–03. He returned to Europe in 2004, spending two seasons with Frölunda HC in the Swedish Elitserien and then two more with the Rapperswil-Jona Lakers of the Swiss National League A before returning to Finland and Jokerit in 2008.

== Career statistics ==
=== Regular season and playoffs ===
| | | | Regular season | | | | | Playoffs |
| Season | Team | League | GP | G | A | Pts | PIM | GP | G | A | Pts | PIM |
|---|---|---|---|---|---|---|---|---|---|---|---|---|
| 1990–91 | TPS | FIN U20 | 1 | 0 | 0 | 0 | 0 | — | — | — | — | — |
| 1991–92 | TPS | FIN U20 | 36 | 4 | 9 | 13 | 40 | 8 | 1 | 3 | 4 | 12 |
| 1992–93 | TPS | FIN U20 | 21 | 10 | 8 | 18 | 30 | 5 | 1 | 1 | 2 | 6 |
| 1992–93 | TPS | SM-l | 1 | 0 | 0 | 0 | 0 | 1 | 0 | 0 | 0 | 0 |
| 1992–93 | Kiekko–67 | FIN.2 | 16 | 0 | 4 | 4 | 4 | — | — | — | — | — |
| 1993–94 | TPS | FIN U20 | 10 | 4 | 5 | 9 | 16 | 7 | 0 | 5 | 5 | 8 |
| 1993–94 | TPS | SM-l | 18 | 2 | 5 | 7 | 4 | 1 | 0 | 1 | 1 | 2 |
| 1993–94 | Kiekko–67 | FIN.2 | 16 | 4 | 12 | 16 | 2 | — | — | — | — | — |
| 1994–95 | TPS | FIN U20 | 5 | 0 | 2 | 2 | 8 | — | — | — | — | — |
| 1994–95 | Kiekko–67 | FIN.2 | 14 | 7 | 3 | 10 | 6 | — | — | — | — | — |
| 1994–95 | TPS | SM-l | 4 | 0 | 0 | 0 | 4 | — | — | — | — | — |
| 1994–95 | HPK | SM-l | 25 | 3 | 3 | 6 | 16 | — | — | — | — | — |
| 1995–96 | HPK | SM-l | 50 | 8 | 11 | 19 | 52 | 9 | 1 | 2 | 3 | 6 |
| 1996–97 | HPK | SM-l | 46 | 18 | 17 | 35 | 50 | 10 | 4 | 2 | 6 | 6 |
| 1997–98 | HPK | SM-l | 23 | 6 | 6 | 12 | 28 | — | — | — | — | — |
| 1998–99 | HPK | SM-l | 52 | 13 | 26 | 39 | 91 | 8 | 5 | 1 | 6 | 14 |
| 1999–2000 | Jokerit | SM-l | 43 | 8 | 20 | 28 | 58 | 11 | 2 | 1 | 3 | 2 |
| 2000–01 | Jokerit | SM-l | 47 | 8 | 15 | 23 | 36 | 5 | 0 | 0 | 0 | 2 |
| 2001–02 | Jokerit | SM-l | 43 | 8 | 14 | 22 | 30 | 12 | 3 | 8 | 11 | 2 |
| 2002–03 | St. Louis Blues | NHL | 22 | 2 | 4 | 6 | 10 | — | — | — | — | — |
| 2002–03 | Worcester IceCats | AHL | 47 | 4 | 13 | 17 | 32 | 3 | 0 | 0 | 0 | 0 |
| 2003–04 | Worcester IceCats | AHL | 28 | 4 | 13 | 17 | 16 | — | — | — | — | — |
| 2003–04 | Springfield Falcons | AHL | 17 | 0 | 8 | 8 | 12 | — | — | — | — | — |
| 2004–05 | Frölunda HC | SEL | 50 | 9 | 19 | 28 | 66 | 14 | 1 | 1 | 2 | 14 |
| 2005–06 | Frölunda HC | SEL | 40 | 6 | 16 | 22 | 76 | 17 | 5 | 2 | 7 | 30 |
| 2006–07 | Rapperswil–Jona Lakers | NLA | 36 | 7 | 17 | 24 | 91 | 6 | 0 | 4 | 4 | 8 |
| 2007–08 | Rapperswil–Jona Lakers | NLA | 47 | 7 | 10 | 17 | 46 | 4 | 0 | 1 | 1 | 4 |
| 2008–09 | Jokerit | SM-l | 43 | 5 | 17 | 22 | 56 | 5 | 1 | 0 | 1 | 2 |
| 2009–10 | Jokerit | SM-l | 40 | 6 | 13 | 19 | 40 | 3 | 0 | 3 | 3 | 2 |
| 2010–11 | Tingsryds AIF | SWE.2 | 52 | 13 | 15 | 28 | 86 | — | — | — | — | — |
| 2011–12 | Tingsryds AIF | SWE.2 | 46 | 6 | 20 | 26 | 52 | — | — | — | — | — |
| SM-l totals | | | 435 | 85 | 147 | 232 | 463 | 65 | 16 | 18 | 34 | 38 |

=== International ===
| Year | Team | Event | GP | G | A | Pts | PIM |
|---|---|---|---|---|---|---|---|
| 1992 | Finland | EJC | 5 | 0 | 2 | 2 | 2 |
| 1993 | Finland | WJC | 7 | 0 | 1 | 1 | 0 |
| 1994 | Finland | WJC | 7 | 1 | 0 | 1 | 6 |
| 2002 | Finland | WC | 9 | 2 | 1 | 3 | 4 |
| Junior totals | | | 19 | 1 | 3 | 4 | 8 |

== Achievements ==
- Pekka Rautakallio trophy for best defenceman in the SM-liiga - 2002

| Preceded by Jouni Loponen | Winner of the Pekka Rautakallio trophy 2001–02 | Succeeded by Marko Tuulola |
