= Marko Kiprusoff =

Finnish ice hockey player (born 1972)

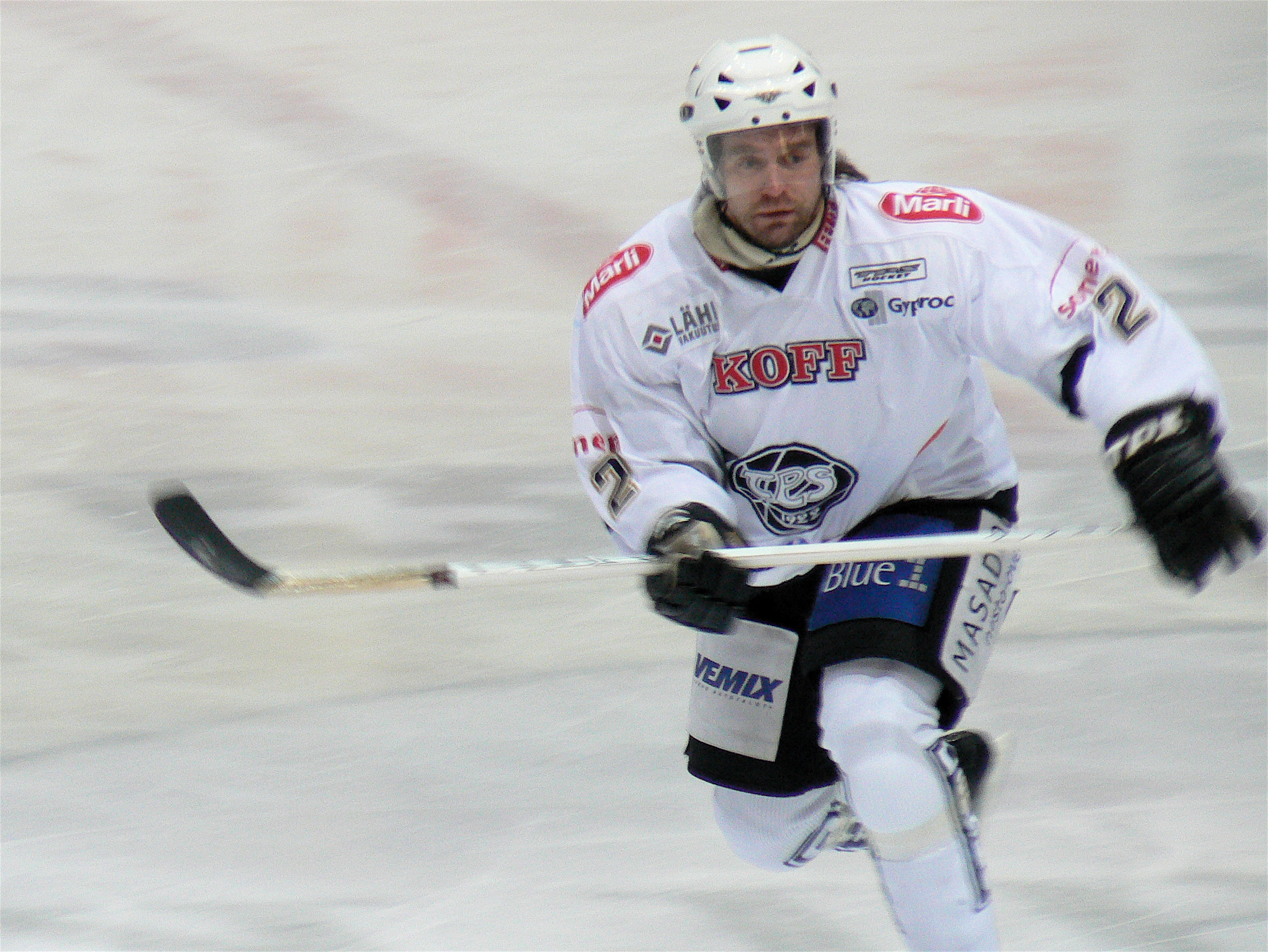
- Born: June 6, 1972 (age 53) Turku, Finland
- Height: 6 ft 0 in (183 cm)
- Weight: 200 lb (91 kg; 14 st 4 lb)
- Position: Defence
- Shot: Right
- Played for: TPS; Montreal Canadiens; Malmö IF; Kloten Flyers; New York Islanders; Ducs d'Angers; Vasas Budapest Stars
- National team: Finland
- NHL draft: 70th overall, 1994; Montreal Canadiens
- Playing career: 1990–2014

Marko Kristian Kiprusoff (born June 6, 1972) is a Finnish former professional ice hockey defenceman. He is currently an assistant junior coach in Finnish hockey club TPS.

== Draft ==
He was drafted by the Montreal Canadiens as their third-round pick, 70th overall, in the 1994 NHL entry draft.

== Playing career ==
=== SM-liiga Career ===
Marko Kiprusoff started his hockey career with TPS. Kiprusoff also had a three-game visit to HPK during his earlier seasons in the SM-liiga. Kiprusoff earned a reputation as a solid offensive defenceman at TPS and after his successful performances for the Finnish National team and TPS, Kiprusoff was contracted by the Montreal Canadiens.

Kiprusoff won the SM-liiga championship twice, in 1993 and 1995. Kiprusoff also captured the European Championship with TPS in 1994.

=== First NHL visit ===
Kiprusoff spent the 1995–96 season with the Montreal Canadiens but he didn't make much of an impact in the NHL. Kiprusoff played 24 games for the Canadiens and 28 more for Montreal's AHL-affiliate, the Fredericton Canadiens.

=== Return to Europe ===
After his initial season in the NHL, Kiprusoff played two seasons in the Swedish Elitserien for Malmö IF, after which he returned to TPS in 1998. Kiprusoff won two more SM-liiga championships with TPS, making him a four-time SM-liiga champion. Kiprusoff then played the 2001–02 with the New York Islanders and played after that for EHC Kloten in Switzerland.

In 2004 Kiprusoff returned again to TPS, where he played until the end of the 2008-09 season. On 21 May 2009 he signed a contract with French team Ducs d'Angers of the Ligue Magnus. Kiprusoff made a two-year player/coach-contract with the Kuusamon Pallo-Karhut in June 2011. He played in Kuusamo in January 2011, one game, making two points.

== International play ==
Marko Kiprusoff
Medal record

Representing Finland

Men's ice hockey

Olympic Games
Bronze medal – third place	1994 Lillehammer	Ice hockey

World Championships
Silver medal – second place	1994 Italy	Ice hockey
Gold medal – first place	1995 Sweden	Ice hockey
Silver medal – second place	1998 Switzerland	Ice hockey
Silver medal – second place	1999 Norway	Ice hockey
Silver medal – second place	2001 Germany	Ice hockey

Kiprusoff was a mainstay on the Finnish national team during most of the '90s. Kiprusoff played 198 National Team games and was on the Finnish national team when they won Finland's first Ice Hockey World Championships gold medal in 1995.

Kiprusoff's last international tournament callup was during the 2003 World Championship Tournament.

== Awards ==
- Pekka Rautakallio trophy for best defenceman in the SM-liiga - 1995
- Raimo Kilpiö trophy for gentleman player in the SM-liiga - 1999

== Personal life ==
He is the older brother of Miikka Kiprusoff.

== Career statistics ==
=== Regular season and playoffs ===
			Regular season					Playoffs
Season	Team	League	GP	G	A	Pts	PIM	GP	G	A	Pts	PIM
1988–89	TPS	FIN U18	8	7	10	17	0	4	6	5	11	4
1988–89	TPS	FIN U20	19	3	5	8	4	—	—	—	—	—
1989–90	TPS	FIN U20	37	8	15	23	4	—	—	—	—	—
1990–91	TPS	FIN U20	17	2	9	11	2	—	—	—	—	—
1990–91	TPS	SM-l	3	0	0	0	0	—	—	—	—	—
1990–91	TuTo	FIN.2	22	4	8	12	0	—	—	—	—	—
1991–92	TPS	SM-l	23	0	2	2	0	—	—	—	—	—
1991–92	Kiekko-67	FIN.2	4	0	0	0	2	—	—	—	—	—
1991–92	HPK	SM-l	3	0	0	0	0	—	—	—	—	—
1991–92	HPK	FIN U20	1	2	0	2	0	—	—	—	—	—
1992–93	Kiekko-67	FIN.2	1	0	1	1	2	—	—	—	—	—
1992–93	TPS	SM-l	43	3	7	10	14	12	2	3	5	6
1993–94	TPS	SM-l	48	5	19	24	8	11	0	6	6	4
1994–95	TPS	SM-l	50	10	21	31	16	13	0	9	9	2
1995–96	Montreal Canadiens	NHL	24	0	4	4	8	—	—	—	—	—
1995–96	Fredericton Canadiens	AHL	28	4	10	14	2	10	2	5	7	2
1996–97	Malmö IF	SEL	50	10	18	28	24	4	0	0	0	0
1997–98	Malmö IF	SEL	46	7	16	23	16	—	—	—	—	—
1998–99	TPS	SM-l	49	15	22	37	12	10	3	6	9	0
1999–2000	TPS	SM-l	53	6	27	33	10	11	0	3	3	0
2000–01	Kloten Flyers	NLA	43	6	20	26	10	9	2	7	9	2
2001–02	New York Islanders	NHL	27	0	6	6	4	—	—	—	—	—
2001–02	Bridgeport Sound Tigers	AHL	9	0	2	2	0	—	—	—	—	—
2001–02	TPS	SM-l	11	0	2	2	4	6	1	0	1	2
2002–03	Kloten Flyers	NLA	39	7	12	19	20	5	0	1	1	0
2003–04	Kloten Flyers	NLA	35	3	13	16	33	—	—	—	—	—
2004–05	TPS	SM-l	50	11	26	37	28	—	—	—	—	—
2005–06	TPS	SM-l	53	5	11	16	16	1	0	0	0	0
2006–07	TPS	SM-l	55	4	25	29	22	2	0	0	0	0
2007–08	TPS	SM-l	55	4	22	26	10	2	0	0	0	4
2008–09	TPS	SM-l	34	0	10	10	20	8	0	2	2	4
SM-l totals			529	63	194	257	160	76	6	29	35	22
SEL totals			96	17	34	51	40	4	0	0	0	0
NLA totals			117	16	45	61	63	14	2	8	10	2

=== International ===
Year	Team	Event	GP	G	A	Pts	PIM
1990	Finland	EJC	6	0	2	2	8
1992	Finland	WJC	7	2	2	4	2
1994	Finland	OLY	8	3	3	6	4
1994	Finland	WC	8	2	1	3	2
1995	Finland	WC	8	0	3	3	0
1996	Finland	WCH	4	0	1	1	0
1997	Finland	WC	8	0	2	2	2
1998	Finland	WC	10	2	1	3	4
1999	Finland	WC	10	1	4	5	4
2001	Finland	WC	9	1	1	2	4
2003	Finland	WC	4	0	1	1	0
Junior totals			13	2	4	6	10
Senior totals			69	9	17	26	20

== See also ==
- List of Olympic medalist families

Preceded by Petteri Nummelin	Winner of the Pekka Rautakallio trophy 1994–95	Succeeded by Mika Strömberg
Preceded by Kimmo Rintanen	Winner of the Raimo Kilpiö trophy 1998–99	Succeeded by Kimmo Rintanen
