= Lasse Kukkonen =

Finnish ice hockey player

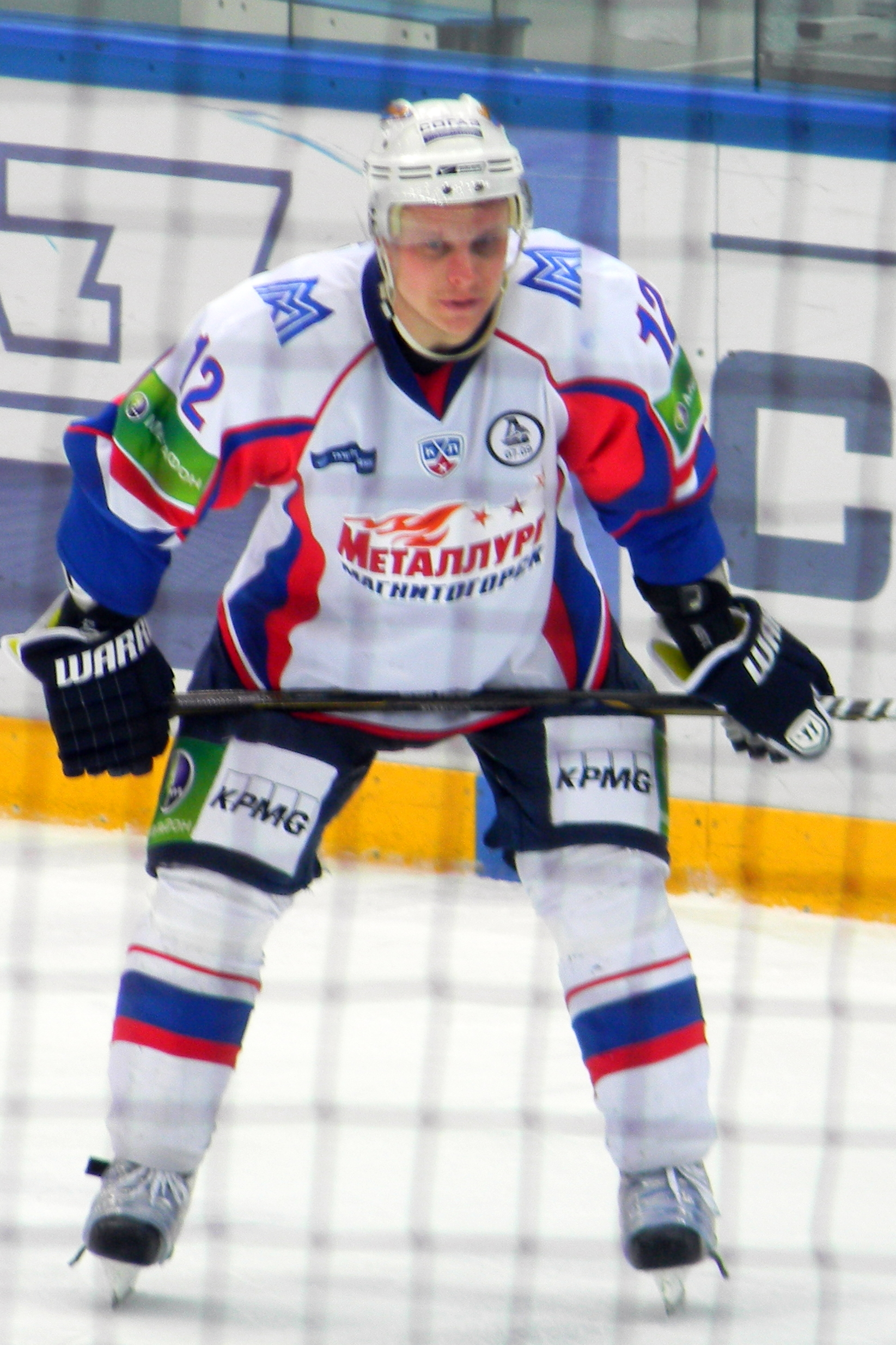
- Born: 18 September 1981 (age 45) Oulu, Finland
- Height: 6 ft 0 in (183 cm)
- Weight: 187 lb (85 kg; 13 st 5 lb)
- Position: Defence
- Shot: Left
- Played for: Chicago Blackhawks; Philadelphia Flyers; Avangard Omsk; Metallurg Magnitogorsk; Rögle BK; Oulun Kärpät
- National team: Finland
- NHL draft: 151st overall, 2003; Chicago Blackhawks
- Playing career: 2000–2020

Lasse Juhani Kukkonen (born 18 September 1981) is a retired Finnish professional ice hockey defenceman. He last played for Oulun Kärpät of the Finnish Liiga. Earlier in his career, he had a four-year stint in the National Hockey League (NHL) with the Chicago Blackhawks and Philadelphia Flyers. After his career in ice hockey, Kukkonen is working as a lecturer and trainer specialising in mental coaching and leadership.

== Playing career ==
Kukkonen was drafted by the Chicago Blackhawks as their fifth-round pick, 151st overall, in the 2003 NHL entry draft. He played ten National Hockey League games during the 2003–04 NHL season, after which he returned to his hometown Kärpät in the SM-liiga. Kukkonen won the SM-liiga gold medal with Kärpät in 2005.

In the 2006-07 season, Kukkonen returned to the Chicago Blackhawks and played in 54 games before he was dealt to the Philadelphia Flyers along with a 3rd-round draft pick in a three-way deal with the Chicago Blackhawks and Detroit Red Wings on 26 February 2007. With the Flyers, Kukkonen was put on a defensive pairing with Joni Pitkänen, also a native of Oulu. The two were also a pairing for 4 years in Finland. On 17 May 2007 he signed a two-year contract with the Flyers.

On 24 June 2009, Kukkonen signed a two-year deal with Russian team Avangard Omsk of the KHL.

== International play ==
- He was named to the Finnish Olympic team at the 2006 Winter Olympics after defenceman Sami Salo was injured, and played in both the semifinal match versus Russia and the gold medal match versus Sweden.
- Kukkonen was named the Finnish national team as captain of the 2018 Winter Olympics in South Korea.

== Career statistics ==
=== Regular season and playoffs ===
			Regular season					Playoffs
Season	Team	League	GP	G	A	Pts	PIM	GP	G	A	Pts	PIM
1998–99	Kärpät	FIN U20	22	2	9	11	14	—	—	—	—	—
1999–2000	Kärpät	FIN U20	27	9	11	20	26	—	—	—	—	—
1999–2000	Kärpät	FIN.2	22	0	4	4	14	—	—	—	—	—
2000–01	Kärpät	SM-l	47	1	5	6	46	9	0	2	2	4
2001–02	Kärpät	SM-l	55	2	6	8	42	4	0	3	3	4
2001–02	Kärpät	FIN U20	—	—	—	—	—	1	1	0	1	0
2002–03	Kärpät	SM-l	56	6	12	18	67	15	1	4	5	16
2003–04	Chicago Blackhawks	NHL	10	0	1	1	4	—	—	—	—	—
2003–04	Norfolk Admirals	AHL	59	3	11	14	58	8	0	0	0	8
2004–05	Kärpät	SM-l	55	5	13	18	68	12	0	2	2	6
2005–06	Kärpät	SM-l	56	11	16	27	38	11	5	7	12	8
2006–07	Chicago Blackhawks	NHL	54	5	9	14	30	—	—	—	—	—
2006–07	Philadelphia Flyers	NHL	20	0	0	0	8	—	—	—	—	—
2007–08	Philadelphia Flyers	NHL	53	1	4	5	38	14	0	2	2	6
2008–09	Philadelphia Flyers	NHL	22	0	2	2	10	—	—	—	—	—
2008–09	Philadelphia Phantoms	AHL	26	0	11	11	20	4	2	0	2	6
2009–10	Avangard Omsk	KHL	53	6	6	12	34	3	0	1	1	0
2010–11	Metallurg Magnitogorsk	KHL	37	4	8	12	16	5	0	0	0	0
2011–12	Metallurg Magnitogorsk	KHL	51	4	4	8	22	10	0	1	1	4
2012–13	Rögle BK	SEL	54	2	4	6	30	—	—	—	—	—
2013–14	Kärpät	Liiga	55	12	16	28	52	16	2	8	10	16
2014–15	Kärpät	Liiga	59	11	10	21	26	12	2	3	5	2
2015–16	Kärpät	Liiga	58	6	19	25	54	14	2	3	5	4
2016–17	Kärpät	Liiga	48	7	15	22	26	2	0	0	0	0
2017–18	Kärpät	Liiga	54	3	10	13	30	18	4	2	6	10
2018–19	Kärpät	Liiga	58	6	10	16	47	17	1	3	4	2
2019–20	Kärpät	Liiga	50	2	2	4	14	—	—	—	—	—
2020–21	Kärpät	Liiga	1	0	0	0	0	—	—	—	—	—
SM-l/Liiga totals			652	72	134	206	510	130	17	37	54	72
NHL totals			159	6	16	22	90	14	0	2	2	6
KHL totals			141	14	18	32	72	18	0	2	2	4

=== International ===
Medal record

Representing Finland

Ice hockey

Olympic Games
Silver medal – second place	2006 Turin	
Bronze medal – third place	2010 Vancouver	
Bronze medal – third place	2014 Sochi	

World Championships
Gold medal – first place	2011 Slovakia	
Silver medal – second place	2016 Russia	
Silver medal – second place	2007 Russia	
Bronze medal – third place	2006 Latvia	

World Junior Championships
Silver medal – second place	2001 Russia	

World U18 Championships
Gold medal – first place	1999 Germany	

Year	Team	Event	Place	GP	G	A	Pts	PIM
1999	Finland	WJC18	1st place, gold medalist(s)	7	1	1	2	0
2001	Finland	WJC	2nd place, silver medalist(s)	7	0	0	0	2
2005	Finland	WC	7th	7	0	0	0	2
2006	Finland	OG	2nd place, silver medalist(s)	2	0	0	0	0
2006	Finland	WC	3rd place, bronze medalist(s)	9	2	0	2	8
2007	Finland	WC	2nd place, silver medalist(s)	9	0	1	1	4
2009	Finland	WC	5th	6	0	0	0	4
2010	Finland	OG	3rd place, bronze medalist(s)	6	0	1	1	4
2010	Finland	WC	6th	6	0	0	0	2
2011	Finland	WC	1st place, gold medalist(s)	9	0	0	0	0
2012	Finland	WC	4th	10	0	1	1	0
2013	Finland	WC	4th	10	0	0	0	0
2014	Finland	OG	3rd place, bronze medalist(s)	6	0	0	0	2
2016	Finland	WC	2nd place, silver medalist(s)	6	0	0	0	0
2017	Finland	WC	4th	8	0	0	0	12
2018	Finland	OG	6th	5	1	0	1	2
Junior totals				14	1	0	1	2
Senior totals				99	3	3	6	40

== Awards and honours ==
Award	Year
Liiga
Kanada-malja champion	2004–05, 2013-14, 2014-15, 2017-18
(silver) Runner-up	2002–03, 2018–19
(bronze) Third place	2005–06, 2015–16
All-Star Team	2003, 2006, 2014, 2015
Matti Keinonen Trophy	2003, 2006
Pekka Rautakallio Trophy	2006, 2014
Juha Rantasila Trophy	2014
KHL
All-Star Game	2010

Other awards:

- Champions Hockey League: (silver) 2016

Awards and achievements
Preceded by Ilkka Mikkola	Winner of the Pekka Rautakallio trophy 2005–06	Succeeded by Cory Murphy
Preceded by Shaun Heshka	2013–14	Succeeded by Esa Lindell
