= Erik Hämäläinen =

Finnish ice hockey player (born 1965)

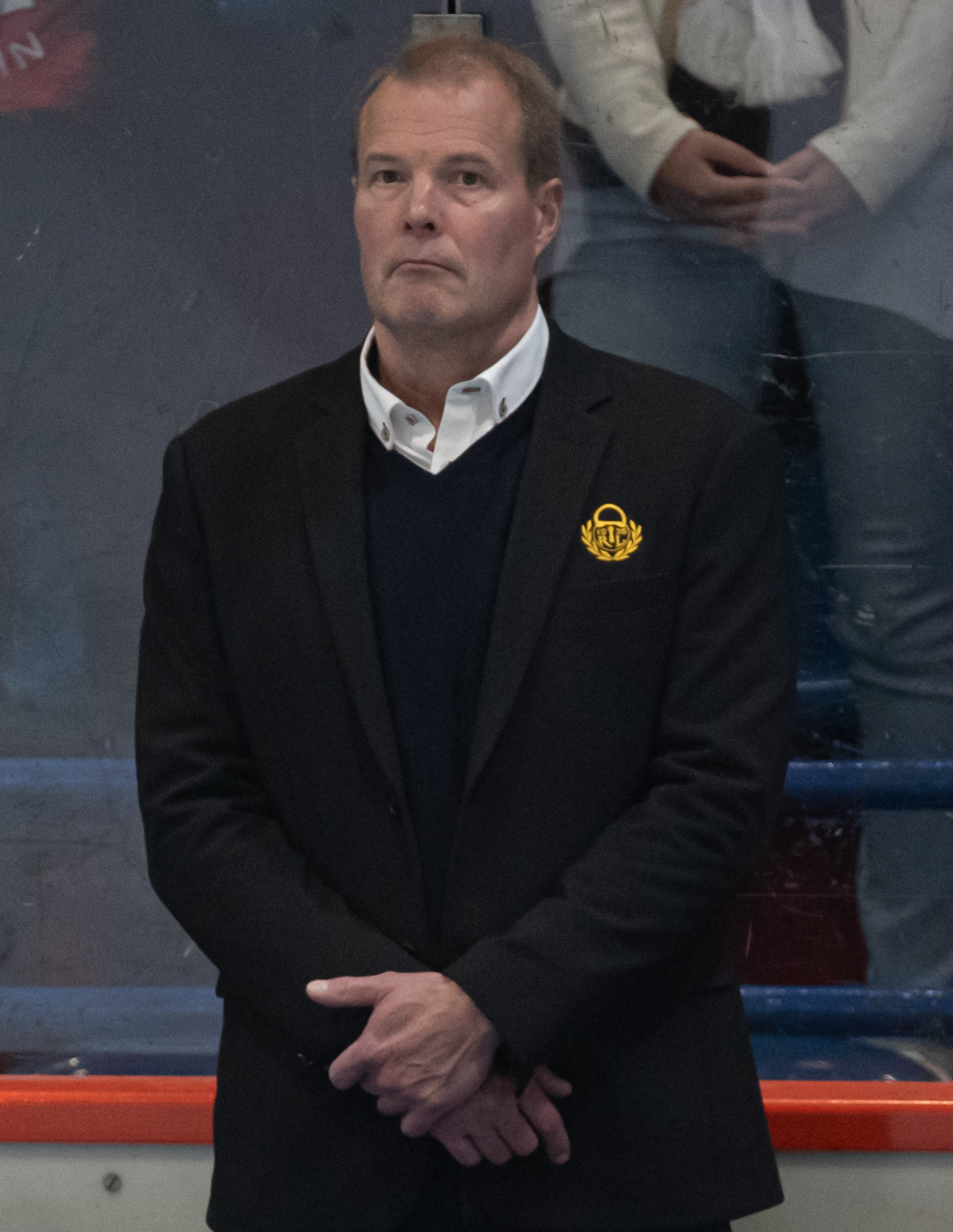
- Born: April 20, 1965 (age 60) Rauma, FIN
- Height: 6 ft 1 in (185 cm)
- Weight: 200 lb (91 kg; 14 st 4 lb)
- Position: Defence
- Shot: Left
- Played for: SM-liiga; Lukko; KalPa; Jokerit; Elitserien; AIK; Nationalliga A SC Langnau
- National team: Finland
- NHL draft: 197th overall, 1985; Detroit Red Wings
- Playing career: 1982–2008

Erik Vesa Hämäläinen (born April 20, 1965, in Rauma, Finland) is a left-handed retired Finnish ice hockey defenceman. Hämäläinen currently is an Ice hockey coach, employed by SM-liiga team Lukko

== Playing career ==
=== Early career ===
Erik Hämäläinen started his professional career with his hometown team, Rauman Lukko, which played in the Finnish SM-liiga. He debuted during the 1982–1983 Season. Lukko was demoted from SM-liiga after the 82–83 season, but gained promotion by winning the I-Divisioona in 1984. Hämäläinen played for six seasons (1982–1988) in Lukko. His last was cut short when an injury sidelined him for most of the season.

In 1989, Hämäläinen moved to Kuopio and started to play for KalPa. He stayed with KalPa for four Seasons (1989–1992) before transferring to Helsingin Jokerit in 1992. During his three-year stint with Jokerit, he won a gold and silver medal to accompany his two silver medals from KalPa and Lukko. He also won the European bronze medal during his first season with Jokerit.

=== World Championship victory and move to Sweden ===
After winning the 1995 World Championships with Finland, Hämäläinen was acquired by AIK. He played with the Swedish team for three seasons (1995–1998). He returned to his old team of Rauman Lukko in 1998. During his three seasons with Lukko, he played twice in the playoffs, but the team failed to get a place in the finals.

=== To Switzerland ===
During the 2000–2001 season, Hämäläinen moved to play for SC Langnau, a Swiss team. After a disappointing season in Switzerland, he returned again to Rauma Lukko.

=== Late career and retirement ===
During the 2005–2006 season, he broke the record for most SM-liiga games played with his 865th game; the previous record was held by Pertti Lehtonen. Hämäläinen's record was broken 18 February 2012 when Jan Latvala played his 1002nd game.

Hämäläinen played his last season during the 2007-08 SM-liiga season. Hämäläinen played his 1000th SM-liiga career game and after the season ended he announced his retirement from playing

== Coaching career ==
Shortly after his announcement regarding his retirement, Hämäläinen was contracted to a 2+2 year contract by Lukko. Hämäläinen will start as an Assistant Coach for Lukko in the beginning of 2008–2009 SM-liiga season.

== International play ==
Erik Hämäläinen
Medal record

Men's ice hockey

Representing Finland

Olympic Games
Bronze medal – third place	1994 Lillehammer	Team competition

Hämäläinen has played 108 games for Finland's national ice hockey team. He participated in four World Championship Tournaments (1992, 1993, 1994 and 1995), winning one gold medal (1995), two silver medals (1992, 1994). He was also part of the 1994 Olympic ice hockey team in Lillehammer, where the team won the bronze medal.

== Career statistics ==
=== Regular season and playoffs ===
			Regular season					Playoffs
Season	Team	League	GP	G	A	Pts	PIM	GP	G	A	Pts	PIM
1982–83	Lukko	SM-l	35	2	1	3	48	—	—	—	—	—
1983–84	Lukko	FIN.2	36	8	2	10	16	—	—	—	—	—
1984–85	Lukko	SM-l	36	4	3	7	25	—	—	—	—	—
1985–86	Lukko	SM-l	31	13	6	19	32	—	—	—	—	—
1986–87	Lukko	SM-l	44	8	8	16	49	—	—	—	—	—
1987–88	Lukko	SM-l	44	8	4	12	54	8	0	3	3	2
1988–89	KalPa	SM-l	43	7	4	11	14	2	0	0	0	2
1989–90	KalPa	SM-l	44	9	20	29	32	6	2	2	4	8
1990–91	KalPa	SM-l	44	14	14	28	34	8	3	4	7	4
1991–92	KalPa	SM-l	44	12	21	33	22	—	—	—	—	—
1992–93	Jokerit	SM-l	48	16	21	37	30	3	3	0	3	4
1993–94	Jokerit	SM-l	48	10	11	21	26	12	1	4	5	4
1994–95	Jokerit	SM-l	49	7	19	26	18	—	—	—	—	—
1995–96	AIK	SEL	40	2	9	11	26	—	—	—	—	—
1996–97	AIK	SEL	48	5	6	11	24	7	0	0	0	4
1997–98	AIK	SEL	46	1	15	16	16	—	—	—	—	—
1998–99	Lukko	SM-l	53	13	10	23	32	—	—	—	—	—
1999–2000	Lukko	SM-l	54	6	12	18	36	4	1	1	2	2
2000–01	Lukko	SM-l	56	10	16	26	30	3	0	0	0	2
2001–02	SC Langnau	NLA	44	10	10	20	6	—	—	—	—	—
2002–03	Lukko	SM-l	53	3	14	17	45	—	—	—	—	—
2003–04	Lukko	SM-l	56	11	15	26	18	4	0	1	1	6
2004–05	Lukko	SM-l	56	2	7	9	34	9	2	0	2	4
2005–06	Lukko	SM-l	56	2	12	14	36	—	—	—	—	—
2006–07	Lukko	SM-l	56	3	11	14	42	3	0	0	0	0
2007–08	Lukko	SM-l	51	3	11	14	22	3	0	1	1	0
SM-l totals			1001	163	240	403	679	65	12	16	28	38
SEL totals			134	8	30	38	66	17	1	1	2	10

=== International ===
Year	Team	Event	GP	G	A	Pts	PIM
1983	Finland	EJC	5	1	1	2	0
1984	Finland	WJC	7	0	1	1	2
1985	Finland	WJC	7	0	1	1	0
1992	Finland	WC	8	0	1	1	0
1993	Finland	WC	6	0	0	0	7
1994	Finland	OG	8	1	0	1	6
1994	Finland	WC	8	2	1	3	10
1995	Finland	WC	8	0	0	0	8
Junior totals			19	1	3	4	2
Senior totals			38	3	2	5	31

Preceded by Harri Laurila	Winner of the Pekka Rautakallio trophy 1992–93	Succeeded by Petteri Nummelin
Preceded by Waltteri Immonen	Winner of the Matti Keinonen trophy 1992–93	Succeeded by Aleksandr Smirnov
Preceded by Jarmo Kuusisto	Captain of Lukko; 1998–2001	Succeeded by Pasi Saarela
Preceded by Pasi Saarela	Captain of Lukko; 2002–2008	Succeeded by not named
