= Toni Söderholm =

Finnish ice hockey player and coach

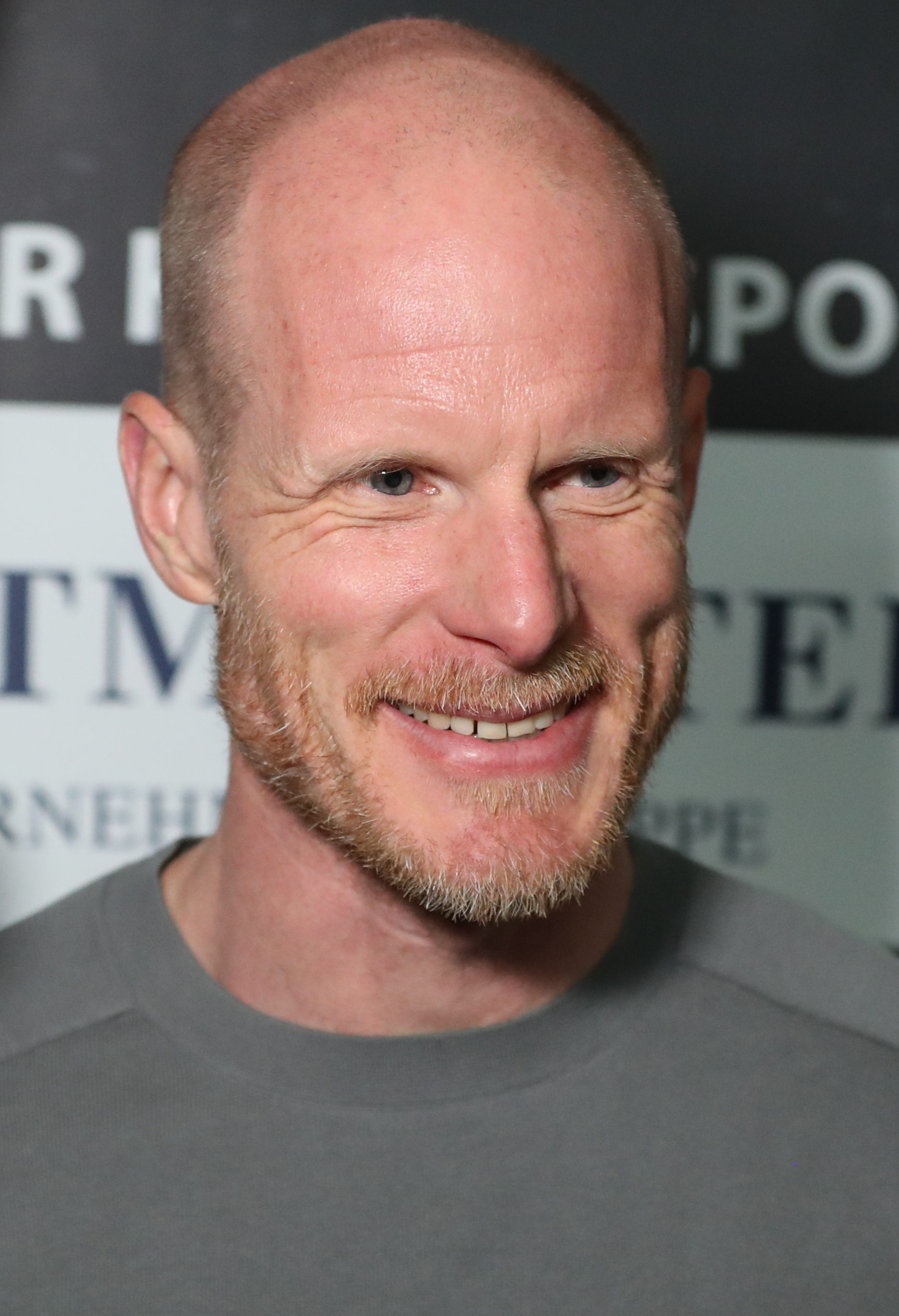
- Born: 14 April 1978 (age 47) Kauniainen, Finland
- Height: 6 ft 2 in (188 cm)
- Weight: 187 lb (85 kg; 13 st 5 lb)
- Position: Defence
- Shot: Left
- Played for: HIFK; SC Bern; Frölunda HC; EHC München
- National team: Finland
- NHL draft: Undrafted
- Playing career: 1998–2016

Toni Kristian Söderholm (born 14 April 1978) is a Finnish professional ice hockey coach and former player.

== Playing career ==
A native of Finland's capital Helsinki, Söderholm played in the HIFK youth system in the early and mid-1990s before taking his game to North America. From 1995 to 1997, he attended Trinity College School in Ontario. For the 1997-98 season, he returned to HIFK and headed across the Atlantic again to enroll at the University of Massachusetts. He served as team captain for the Minutemen his senior year (2001–02).

Upon graduation, Söderholm returned to HIFK and received Liiga Rookie of the Year honors in the 2002–03 season. In his second year in the league, Söderholm won the Pekka Rautakallio Award as the Defenceman of the Year. After his third season, in which he served as HIFK captain, he took up an offer from Switzerland and embarked on a two-year stint with SC Bern of the National League A (NLA) in 2005. In 2007, Söderholm signed with Frölunda HC of the Swedish Hockey League (SHL). In the course of the second season with Frölunda, he returned to HIFK. Söderholm won the Finnish championship with HIFK in 2011 and was presented with the Jari Kurri Award as the MVP of the playoffs.

On 7 April 2015, after a total of 10 seasons with HIFK's men's team, Söderholm left for a second time abroad in his professional career to provide a veteran presence with German club EHC München of the Deutsche Eishockey Liga (DEL), signing a one-year contract. He won the German championship in his single season with the München team and announced the end of his playing career several weeks later in May 2016.

== International play ==
Söderholm earned his first caps for Finland's men's national team during the 2002–03 Euro Hockey Tour. In 2004, he competed in his first World Championship with Team Finland and also made the roster for the 2005 and 2007 World Championships, winning silver in 2007.

== Coaching career ==
In June 2016, a couple of weeks after he ended his playing career, Söderholm was named development coach of EHC München of the German top-flight Deutsche Eishockey Liga (DEL). In May 2017, he took over the head coaching job at SC Riessersee (SCR), München's affiliate in Germany's second-tier league DEL2. He guided SCR to the DEL2 finals in spring 2018, where they lost to Bietigheim. Söderholm earned DEL2 Coach of the Year honors for the 2017–18 season. SCR had to file for insolvency and therefore was relegated to the Oberliga before the start of the 2018–19 campaign. However, Söderholm stayed on the job. On 20 December 2018 Söderholm was named the new head coach of the German men's national team.

=== Teams ===
- SC Riessersee, DEL2.
- German men's national team: IIHF World Championships: 2019, 2021, 2022. Winter Olympics: 2022
- SC Bern, Swiss National League
- EHC Red Bull München, DEL.
- TPS, Liiga.

Toni Söderholm
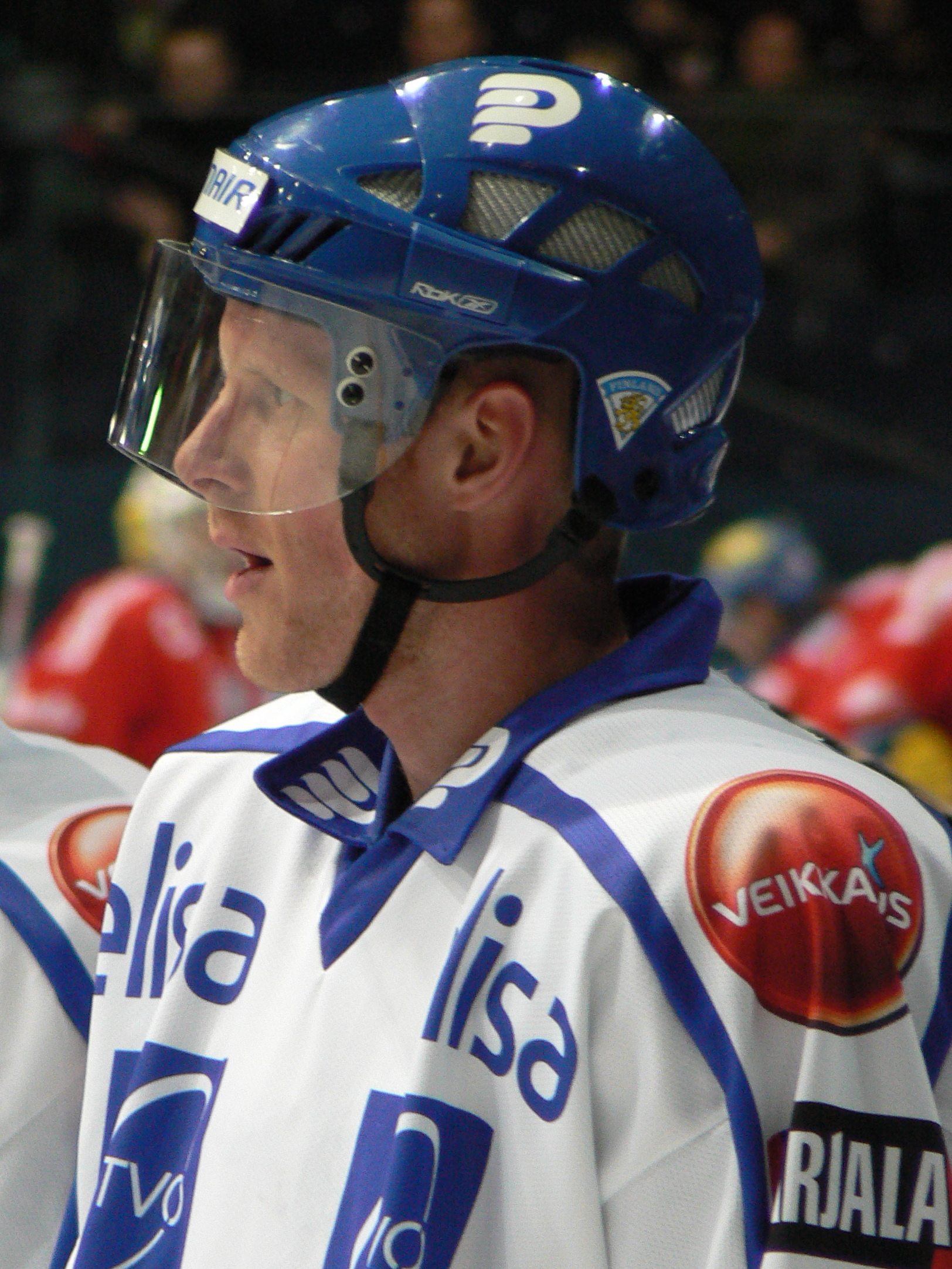

Medal record

Representing Finland

Men's ice hockey

World Championships
Silver medal – second place	2007 Russia	

== Honours and accolades ==
- Won the Finnish SM-liiga Champion (Kanada-malja) in 2010–11 season.
- Won the Deutsche Eishockey Liga (DEL) champion in 2015–16 season.
- Won the National League (NL) silver in 2006–07 season.
- Won the Jarmo Wasama memorial trophy in 2003.
- Won the Pekka Rautakallio trophy in 2004.
- Won the Jari Kurri Trophy in 2011.
- Won the Matti Keinonen trophy in 2012.

== Career statistics ==
=== Regular season and playoffs ===
			Regular season					Playoffs
Season	Team	League	GP	G	A	Pts	PIM	GP	G	A	Pts	PIM
1994–95	HIFK	FIN U18	25	2	6	8	12	1	0	1	1	0
1995–96	Trinity College School	CISAA
1996–97	Trinity College School	CISAA
1997–98	HIFK	FIN U20	29	2	5	7	22	—	—	—	—	—
1998–99	UMass Minutemen	HE	35	1	8	9	64	—	—	—	—	—
1999–2000	UMass Minutemen	HE	32	3	12	15	32	—	—	—	—	—
2000–01	UMass Minutemen	HE	24	1	7	8	23	—	—	—	—	—
2001–02	UMass Minutemen	HE	33	2	15	17	28	—	—	—	—	—
2002–03	HIFK	SM-l	52	8	15	23	49	4	0	2	2	4
2003–04	HIFK	SM-l	56	16	21	37	72	11	1	1	2	4
2004–05	HIFK	SM-l	51	5	19	24	30	5	0	1	1	2
2005–06	SC Bern	NLA	44	12	12	24	38	6	0	1	1	8
2006–07	SC Bern	NLA	40	7	14	21	44	17	4	5	9	14
2007–08	Frölunda HC	SEL	53	6	14	20	66	7	0	2	2	0
2008–09	Frölunda HC	SEL	36	3	7	10	53	—	—	—	—	—
2008–09	HIFK	SM-l	7	2	1	3	29	2	0	0	0	0
2009–10	HIFK	SM-l	55	5	16	21	34	6	1	3	4	2
2010–11	HIFK	SM-l	55	5	20	25	62	16	4	6	10	12
2011–12	HIFK	SM-l	60	8	39	47	66	4	2	0	2	2
2012–13	HIFK	SM-l	53	4	23	27	84	8	2	3	5	4
2013–14	HIFK	Liiga	49	6	22	28	32	2	0	0	0	0
2014–15	HIFK	Liiga	25	1	11	12	24	8	1	3	4	6
2015–16	EHC München	DEL	50	6	20	26	66	14	2	4	6	22
SM-l totals			463	60	187	247	482	66	11	19	30	36

=== International ===
Year	Team	Event	Result	GP	G	A	Pts	PIM
2004	Finland	WC	6th	7	0	0	0	6
2005	Finland	WC	7th	3	0	0	0	0
2007	Finland	WC	2nd place, silver medalist(s)	9	0	1	1	4
Senior totals				19	0	1	1	10

Awards and achievements
Preceded by Marko Tuulola	Winner of the Pekka Rautakallio trophy 2003–04	Succeeded by Ilkka Mikkola
