= Mika Strömberg =

Finnish ice hockey player

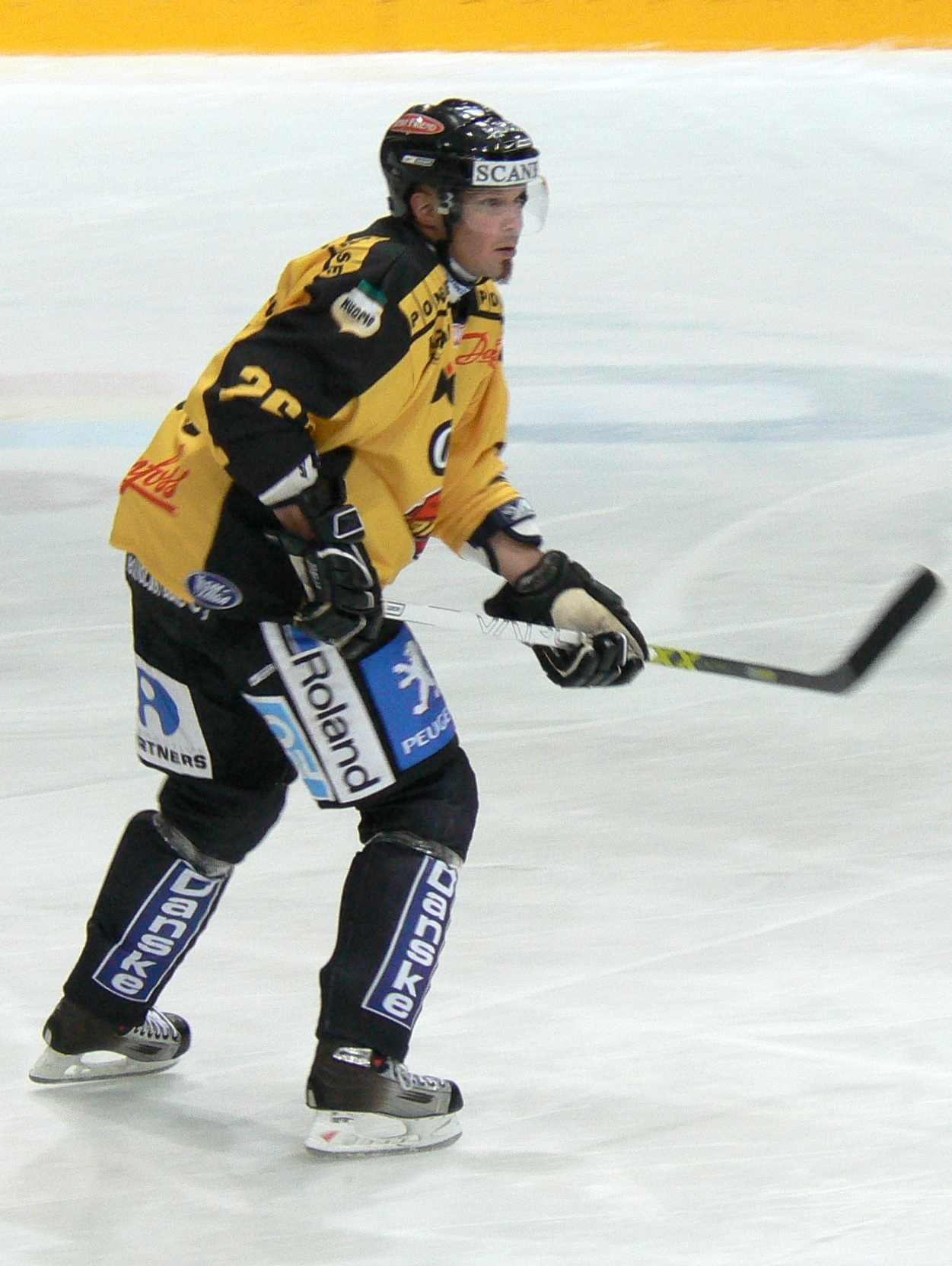
- Born: February 28, 1970 (age 56) Helsinki, FIN
- Height: 5 ft 11 in (180 cm)
- Weight: 189 lb (86 kg; 13 st 7 lb)
- Position: Defence
- Shot: Left
- SM-l team Former teams: KalPa; Jokerit; HPK; Nationalliga A HC Fribourg-Gottéron; EHC Chur; Elitserien; Djurgårdens IF
- National team: Finland
- NHL draft: 211th overall, 1990; Quebec Nordiques
- Playing career: 1989–2010

Mika Juhani Strömberg (born February 28, 1970, in Helsinki, Finland) is a Finnish professional ice hockey defenceman. He was drafted by the Quebec Nordiques as their eleventh-round pick, #211 overall, in the 1990 NHL entry draft.

After a ten-year career with Jokerit, he spent three years in Switzerland, with HC Fribourg-Gottéron and EHC Chur. After coming back to Jokerit for one season Strömberg again went overseas, this time to Stockholm and the Djurgårdens IF in the Swedish Elitserien. For the 2006–07 season Strömberg returned to Finland to play for HPK. After his single season for HPK, Strömberg was first contracted by KalPa and then he was bought mid-07/08 season to Jokerit. After the 07/08 season, Strömberg returned to KalPa.

== Awards and achievements ==
- Pekka Rautakallio trophy for best defenceman in the SM-liiga - 1996
- SM-liiga championship four times with Jokerit: 1992, 1994, 1996 and 1997.
- Gold medal at the 1995 Ice Hockey World Championships; Finland's first IIHF gold medal.

== Records ==
- Jokerit franchise record for most all-time points, goals, and assists by a defenceman.

== Career statistics ==
=== Regular season and playoffs ===
			Regular season					Playoffs
Season	Team	League	GP	G	A	Pts	PIM	GP	G	A	Pts	PIM
1986–87	Jokerit	FIN U20	34	7	5	12	46	—	—	—	—	—
1987–88	Jokerit	FIN U20	33	9	10	19	32	5	2	3	5	0
1987–88	Jokerit	FIN.2	1	1	0	1	0	—	—	—	—	—
1988–89	Jokerit	FIN U20	3	2	3	5	10	—	—	—	—	—
1988–89	Jokerit	FIN.2	39	6	12	18	62	—	—	—	—	—
1989–90	Jokerit	FIN U20	1	0	1	1	4	—	—	—	—	—
1989–90	Jokerit	SM-l	42	2	15	17	42	—	—	—	—	—
1989–90	Urheilukoulu	FIN U20	9	4	6	10	11	—	—	—	—	—
1990–91	Jokerit	FIN U20	1	1	0	1	0	—	—	—	—	—
1990–91	Jokerit	SM-l	44	4	16	20	36	—	—	—	—	—
1991–92	Jokerit	SM-l	36	7	14	21	32	9	2	3	5	16
1992–93	Jokerit	SM-l	16	2	5	7	6	3	1	2	3	4
1992–93	Vantaa HT	FIN.2	1	1	0	1	2	—	—	—	—	—
1993–94	Jokerit	SM-l	48	17	8	25	53	12	1	3	4	8
1994–95	Jokerit	SM-l	50	15	25	40	52	11	5	5	10	10
1995–96	Jokerit	SM-l	50	15	12	27	83	11	1	11	12	10
1996–97	Jokerit	SM-l	47	11	31	42	38	9	4	5	9	10
1997–98	Jokerit	SM-l	38	7	11	18	56	8	1	5	6	2
1998–99	Jokerit	SM-l	30	4	15	19	32	3	0	3	3	2
1999–2000	HC Fribourg–Gottéron	NLA	35	8	15	23	24	4	0	1	1	0
2000–01	EHC Chur	NLA	37	4	17	21	53	—	—	—	—	—
2001–02	EHC Chur	NLA	43	6	21	27	28	—	—	—	—	—
2002–03	Jokerit	SM-l	45	2	14	16	26	10	1	3	4	6
2003–04	Djurgårdens IF	SEL	24	6	0	6	24	4	1	0	1	2
2004–05	Djurgårdens IF	SEL	44	1	6	7	16	12	0	0	0	2
2005–06	Djurgårdens IF	SEL	34	2	11	13	40	—	—	—	—	—
2006–07	HPK	SM-l	52	3	6	9	46	9	0	2	2	6
2007–08	Jokerit	SM-l	24	1	11	12	36	—	—	—	—	—
2007–08	KalPa	SM-l	26	2	15	17	24	—	—	—	—	—
2008–09	KalPa	SM-l	55	5	22	27	86	12	0	1	1	12
2009–10	KalPa	SM-l	48	6	12	18	69	13	2	3	5	4
2014–15	Viikingit	FIN.4	1	0	1	1	2	—	—	—	—	—
SM-l totals			651	103	232	335	719	110	18	46	64	90
NLA totals			115	18	53	71	103	4	0	1	1	0
SEL totals			102	9	17	26	80	16	1	0	1	4

=== International ===
Year	Team	Event	GP	G	A	Pts	PIM
1988	Finland	EJC	—	0	1	1	—
1989	Finland	WJC	7	2	0	2	14
1990	Finland	WJC	7	1	3	4	6
1994	Finland	OG	7	2	2	4	10
1994	Finland	WC	8	2	2	4	9
1995	Finland	WC	8	2	3	5	12
1996	Finland	WCH	3	1	1	2	2
1996	Finland	WC	6	0	0	0	6
1997	Finland	WC	8	3	3	6	10
Junior totals			14	3	3	6	20
Senior totals			40	10	11	21	49

Preceded by Marko Kiprusoff	Winner of the Pekka Rautakallio trophy 1995–96	Succeeded by Brian Rafalski
