= Pekka Rautakallio trophy =

Ice hockey award given by the Finnish Liiga

The Pekka Rautakallio trophy is an ice hockey award given by the Finnish Liiga to the best defenceman of the season. In 1995 the award was renamed to carry the name of its first winner, Pekka Rautakallio.

== Trophy winners ==
- 1977–78: (Finland) Pekka Rautakallio (Ässät)
- 1978–79: (Finland) Pekka Rautakallio (Ässät)
- 1979–80: (Finland) Reijo Ruotsalainen (Kärpät)
- 1980–81: (Finland) Reijo Ruotsalainen (Kärpät)
- 1981–82: (Finland) Pertti Lehtonen (HIFK)
- 1982–83: (Soviet Union) Nikolai Makarov (Jokerit)
- 1983–84: (Finland) Tapio Levo (Ässät)
- 1984–85: (Finland) Tapio Levo (Ässät)
- 1985–86: (Finland) Pekka Rautakallio (HIFK)
- 1986–87: (Finland) Hannu Virta (TPS)
- 1987–88: (Finland) Timo Jutila (Tappara)
- 1988–89: (Finland) Hannu Virta (TPS)
- 1989–90: (Finland) Hannu Virta (TPS)
- 1990–91: (Finland) Hannu Virta (TPS)
- 1991–92: (Finland) Harri Laurila (JYP)
- 1992–93: (Finland) Erik Hämäläinen (Jokerit)
- 1993–94: (Finland) Petteri Nummelin (TPS)
- 1994–95: (Finland) Marko Kiprusoff (TPS)
- 1995–96: (Finland) Mika Strömberg (Jokerit)
- 1996–97: (United States) Brian Rafalski (HPK)
- 1997–98: (Canada) Allan Measures (Ilves)
- 1998–99: (United States) Brian Rafalski (HIFK)
- 1999–00: (Finland) Toni Lydman (HIFK)
- 2000–01: (Finland) Jouni Loponen (TPS)
- 2001-02: (Finland) Tom Koivisto (Jokerit)
- 2002–03: (Finland) Marko Tuulola (HPK)
- 2003–04: (Finland) Toni Söderholm (HIFK)
- 2004–05: (Finland) Ilkka Mikkola (Kärpät)
- 2005–06: (Finland) Lasse Kukkonen (Kärpät)
- 2006–07: (Canada) Cory Murphy (HIFK)
- 2007–08: (Finland) Arto Laatikainen (Blues)
- 2008–09: (Finland) Markus Seikola (Ilves)
- 2009–10: (United States) Lee Sweatt (TPS)
- 2010–11: (Finland) Sami Vatanen (JYP)
- 2011–12: (Finland) Sami Vatanen (JYP)
- 2012–13: (Canada) Shaun Heshka (Ässät)
- 2013–14: (Finland) Lasse Kukkonen (Kärpät)
- 2014–15: (Finland) Esa Lindell (Ässät)
- 2015–16: (France) Yohann Auvitu (HIFK)
- 2016–17: (Finland) Miika Koivisto (Jukurit)
- 2017–18: (Finland) Miro Heiskanen (HIFK)
- 2018–19: (Finland) Oliwer Kaski (Pelicans)
- 2019–20: (United States) Matt Caito (KooKoo)
- 2020–21: (Sweden) Robin Press (Lukko)
- 2021–22: (Finland) Vili Saarijärvi (Lukko)
- 2022–23: (Finland) Valtteri Kemiläinen (Tappara)
- 2023–24: (Canada) Charle-Edouard D'Astous (KooKoo)
- 2024–25: (Finland) Atro Leppänen (Sport)
