= Kiprusoff =

Surname list

Kiprusoff is a surname. Notable people with the surname include:

- Marko Kiprusoff (born 1972), Finnish ice hockey player
- Miikka Kiprusoff (born 1976), Finnish ice hockey player, brother of Marko
