= Kimmo Rintanen =

Finnish ice hockey player

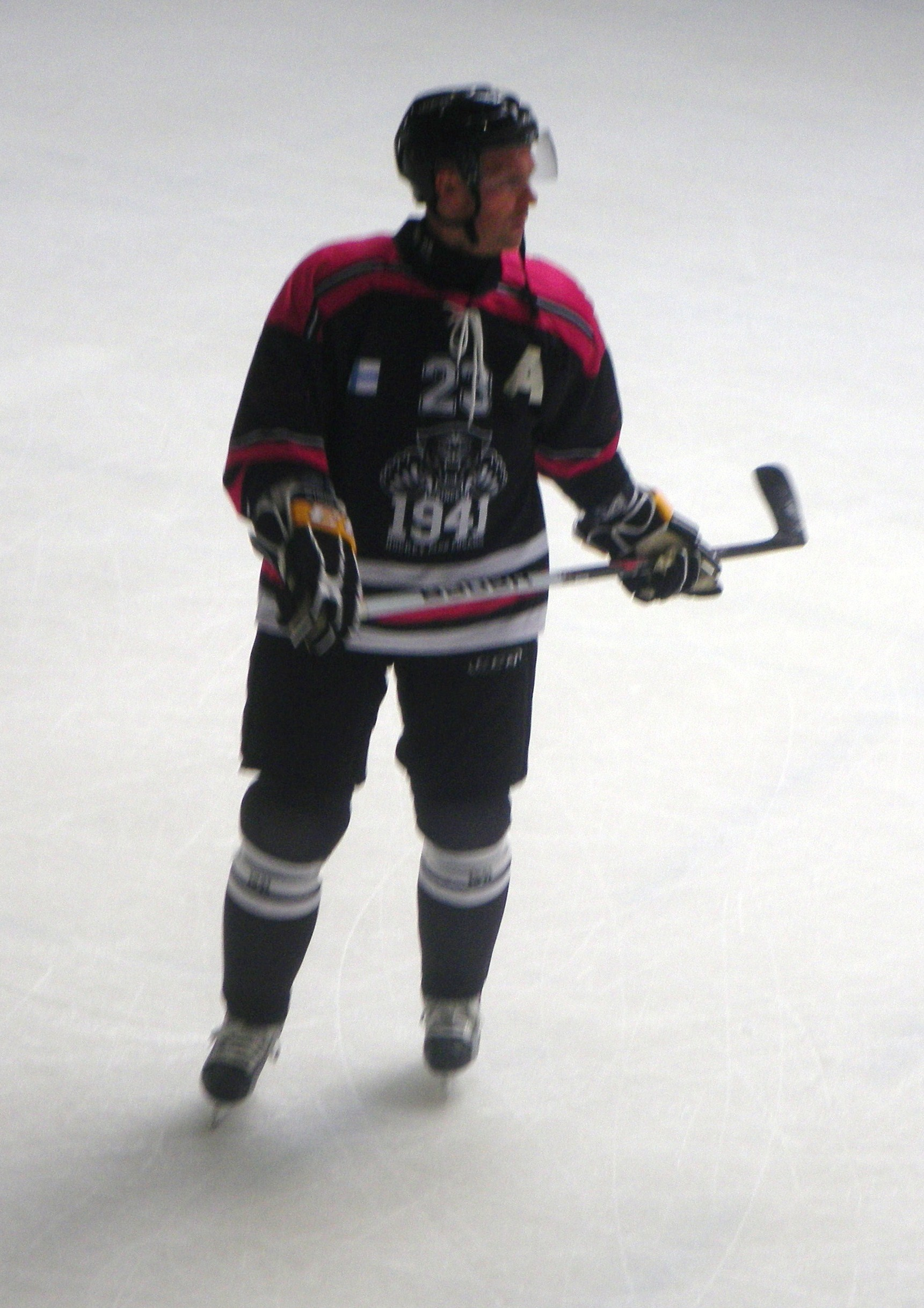
- Born: August 7, 1973 (age 51); Rauma, Finland
- Height: 5 ft 11 in (180 cm)
- Weight: 190 lb (86 kg; 13 st 8 lb)
- Position: Left wing
- Shot: Left
- Played for: Lukko; TPS; Jokerit; Kloten Flyers; HC Lugano
- National team: Finland
- Playing career: 1990–2012

Kimmo Rintanen (born August 7, 1973 in Rauma, Finland) is a former professional ice hockey player who played in the SM-liiga before getting transferred to Swiss Elite League Team Kloten Flyers, where he played from the 2001-02 season until 2010-11, before his final season at HC Lugano in 2011-12. Before his international career, he played for Lukko, TPS, and Jokerit in Finland. He also won a bronze medal at the 1998 Winter Olympics. Rintanen has played 155 matches for the National team of Finland and has scored 35 goals. Starting in 2015 he has been an assistant coach for TPS in Finland.

== Career statistics ==
=== Regular season and playoffs ===
			Regular season					Playoffs
Season	Team	League	GP	G	A	Pts	PIM	GP	G	A	Pts	PIM
1990–91	Lukko	FIN U20	33	20	32	52	24	—	—	—	—	—
1990–91	Lukko	SM-l	8	0	1	1	0	—	—	—	—	—
1991–92	Lukko	SM-l	21	0	0	0	0	—	—	—	—	—
1992–93	Lukko	FIN U20	7	9	8	17	8	—	—	—	—	—
1992–93	Lukko	SM-l	45	18	17	35	10	3	0	1	1	0
1993–94	Lukko	FIN U20	—	—	—	—	—	4	8	10	18	4
1993–94	Lukko	SM-l	48	14	19	33	59	9	0	1	1	6
1994–95	TPS	SM-l	49	13	17	30	12	13	4	3	7	8
1995–96	TPS	SM-l	45	19	20	39	2	10	4	6	10	0
1996–97	TPS	SM-l	46	25	28	53	20	12	5	10	15	0
1997–98	TPS	SM-l	46	17	23	40	2	4	2	0	2	2
1998–99	Jokerit	SM-l	35	8	22	30	14	3	1	0	1	0
1999–2000	TPS	SM-l	54	18	44	62	12	11	7	6	13	2
2000–01	TPS	SM-l	49	23	33	56	10	10	4	4	8	2
2001–02	Kloten Flyers	NLA	44	18	36	54	24	11	3	7	10	4
2002–03	Kloten Flyers	NLA	38	17	31	48	8	5	0	2	2	0
2003–04	Kloten Flyers	NLA	44	20	29	49	14	—	—	—	—	—
2004–05	Kloten Flyers	NLA	44	21	29	50	12	5	6	5	11	0
2005–06	Kloten Flyers	NLA	44	23	26	49	36	11	5	7	12	2
2006–07	Kloten Flyers	NLA	41	24	34	58	16	11	6	7	13	2
2007–08	Kloten Flyers	NLA	50	27	33	60	44	5	5	1	6	2
2008–09	Kloten Flyers	NLA	50	23	44	67	38	15	6	7	13	2
2009–10	Kloten Flyers	NLA	48	15	31	46	26	10	5	5	10	2
2010–11	Kloten Flyers	NLA	36	14	20	34	8	16	3	2	5	6
2011–12	HC Lugano	NLA	42	16	20	36	16	1	1	0	1	0
SM-l totals			446	155	224	379	141	75	27	31	58	20
NLA totals			481	218	335	553	242	90	40	42	82	20

=== International ===
Year	Team	Event	GP	G	A	Pts	PIM
1991	Finland	EJC	6	3	2	5	6
1993	Finland	WJC	7	3	3	6	6
1998	Finland	OG	6	1	0	1	0
1998	Finland	WC	10	0	2	2	0
1999	Finland	WC	12	2	0	2	2
2000	Finland	WC	8	1	6	7	0
2001	Finland	WC	9	2	1	3	0
2002	Finland	WC	9	2	2	4	2
2003	Finland	WC	7	5	4	9	0
2004	Finland	WC	7	1	0	1	2
Junior totals			13	6	5	11	12
Senior totals			68	14	15	29	6
