= Brian Rafalski =

American ice hockey player (born 1973)

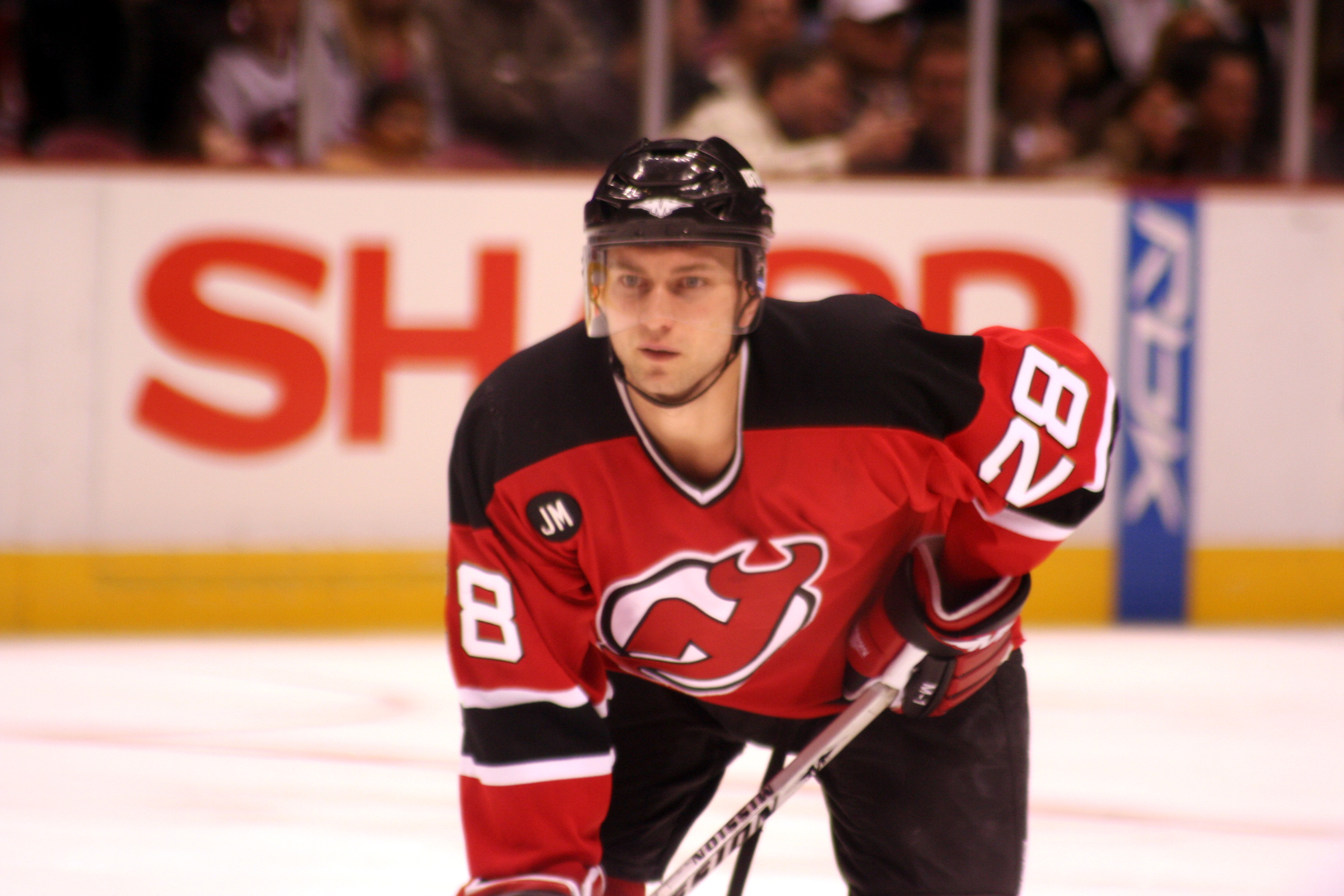
- Rafalski with the New Jersey Devils in 2006
- Born: September 28, 1973 (age 52) Dearborn, Michigan, U.S.
- Height: 5 ft 10 in (178 cm)
- Weight: 191 lb (87 kg; 13 st 9 lb)
- Position: Defense
- Shot: Right
- Played for: Brynäs IF; HPK; HIFK; New Jersey Devils; Detroit Red Wings
- National team: United States
- NHL draft: Undrafted
- Playing career: 1995–2014

Brian Christopher Rafalski (born September 28, 1973) is an American former professional ice hockey defenseman. He played in the National Hockey League (NHL) for the New Jersey Devils and Detroit Red Wings, in the SM-liiga for HPK and HIFK, in the Elitserien for Brynäs IF, and in the ECHL for the Florida Everblades.

After going undrafted, Rafalski spent four seasons in Europe – winning the Pekka Rautakallio trophy as best Liiga Defenseman in 1997, and 1999, the Finnish SM-liiga championship with HIFK in 1998, and the Kultainen kypärä ("the Golden Helmet") in 1999. After entering the NHL in 1999 as a free agent with the Devils, Rafalski played in five Stanley Cup Finals during the 2000s, his first three with the Devils and his last two with the Red Wings. Of the five Finals he played in, he won three Stanley Cups, his first two with the Devils in 2000 and 2003, and his last with the Red Wings in 2008. Rafalski also played for the United States national team in three Olympic ice hockey tournaments (2002, 2006, and 2010), winning silver in 2002 and 2010 after losing to Canada in the gold medal games in both years.

== Playing career ==
=== Amateur ===
As a youth, Rafalski played in the 1987 Quebec International Pee-Wee Hockey Tournament with a minor ice hockey team from Detroit.

Rafalski played for the Madison Capitols of the United States Hockey League (USHL). In 47 games during the 1990–91 season he scored 23 points with 12 goals and 11 assists.

=== College and European play ===
Rafalski played for four years at the University of Wisconsin–Madison and was a proficient player, scoring 45 points in 43 games in his senior year with the Badgers. He won several awards that season – he was named to the WCHA First All-Star Team, the NCAA West All-Star Team and the WCHA Defenseman of the Year. With no immediate NHL prospects, however, Rafalski travelled overseas, spending the 1995–96 season with Brynäs IF of the Swedish Elitserien.

After scoring only nine points in 22 games in Sweden, he then moved to Finland to play a season for HPK of the SM-liiga, scoring 35 points. He then moved to HIFK in 1997, where he spent two successful years. In his final year in Finland, he scored 19 goals and 53 points in 53 games, and won the Kultainen kypärä, awarded to the top SM-liiga player of the season, as voted by fellow players. Notably, he also became the first non-Finnish player to win the award.

=== NHL career ===
==== New Jersey Devils ====
Rafalski was named by Sporting News in 1999 as the best hockey player in the world not playing in the NHL. On May 7, 1999, Rafalski was signed by the New Jersey Devils as a free agent at the age of 25 to start the 1999–2000 season.

Immediately after arriving in New Jersey, Rafalski was partnered on defense with Devils captain Scott Stevens. The two remained as mainstay defensive partners for five years, until Stevens' retirement in 2004. Rafalski finished his rookie season with 32 points and led all rookie defensemen in plus-minus with a +21 rating, second among Devils defensemen and tied for first amongst all rookie players. Rafalski helped the Devils advance to the 2000 Stanley Cup Final against the defending champion Dallas Stars, helping defeat them in six games. Along with Calder Memorial Trophy-winning teammate Scott Gomez, he was named to the NHL All-Rookie Team.

Rafalski improved his production in his sophomore season, scoring 52 points. His 18 points during the 2001 playoffs set a team record for defensemen, and the Devils made the Stanley Cup Final for the second year in a row, although the Devils lost to the Colorado Avalanche in game seven, after leading the series and having two chances to defend their title after their game five win in Denver.

In the 2001–02 season, Rafalski continued his scoring pace, registering 47 points. He was selected to participate in the National Hockey League All-Star Game, but was forced to sit out due to injury. The next season, he once again led all Devils defensemen in scoring, with 40 points. He was a vital part of a Devils defense that helped the team win the Stanley Cup in Game Seven of the 2003 Stanley Cup Final against the Mighty Ducks of Anaheim in June 2003.

==== Detroit Red Wings ====
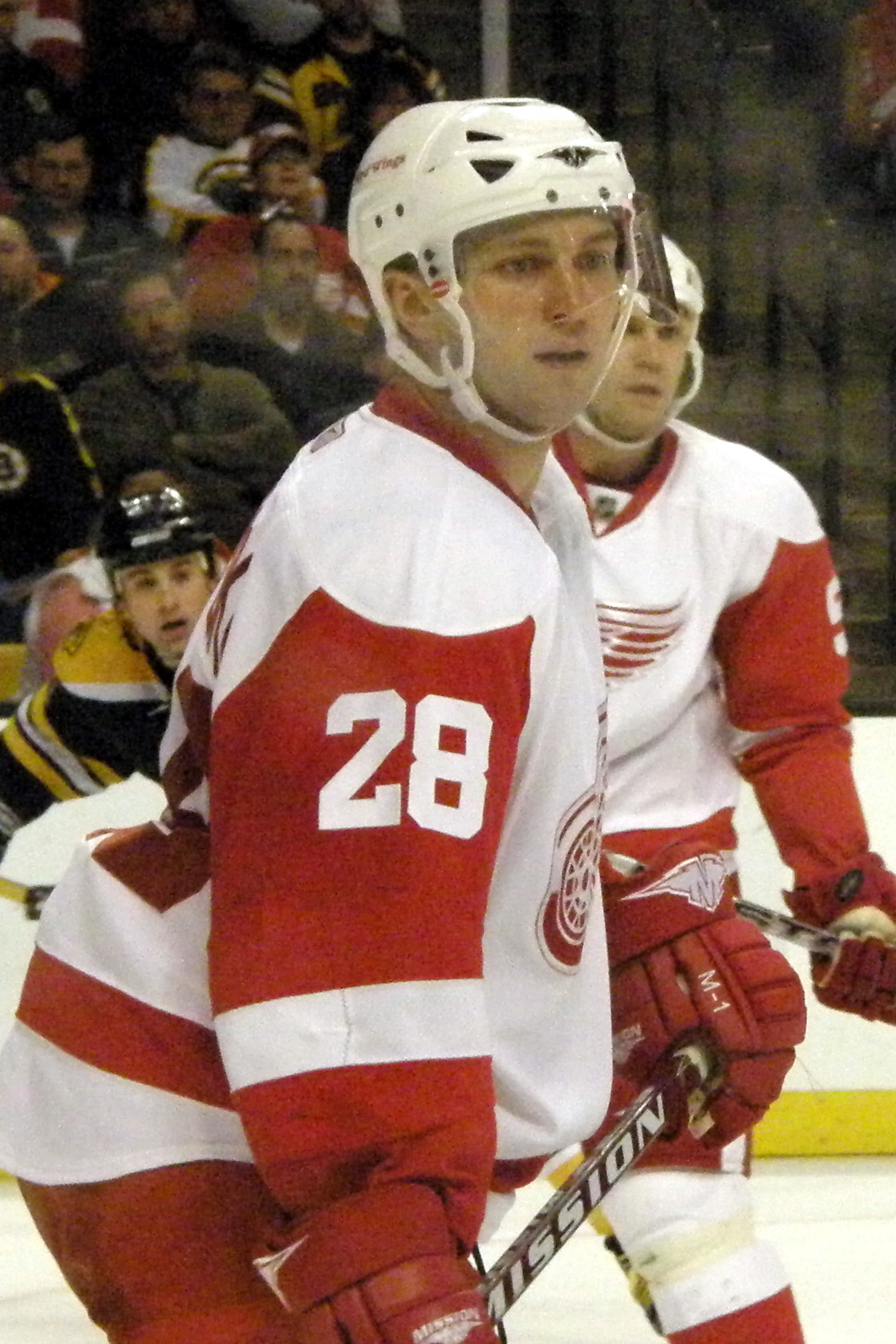
Rafalski with the Detroit Red Wings in February 2008

On July 1, 2007, the Detroit Red Wings signed Rafalski to a $30 million, five-year contract as an unrestricted free agent. Rafalski had grown up in nearby Dearborn, Michigan, and had been a Red Wings fan growing up. He was teamed with another legendary defenseman, Nicklas Lidström.

Rafalski set a career high in goals (11) after scoring against the St. Louis Blues on March 5, 2008. He went on to score 13 goals for the season, amassing that amount in 73 games. On June 4, 2008, Rafalski helped lead the Red Wings to win the Stanley Cup in six games over the Pittsburgh Penguins in the 2008 Stanley Cup Final. He helped the cause by scoring the first Red Wings goal on the power play in the first period of game six to help Detroit win the series.

On January 1, 2009, Rafalski scored the game-winning goal for the Red Wings in the 2009 Winter Classic, the first NHL game played outdoors in Red Wings history. The Red Wings defeated the Chicago Blackhawks, 6–4.

On May 5, 2009, Red Wings Head Coach Mike Babcock announced that Rafalski would miss game three of the Western Conference Semi-finals. It was the first time Rafalski missed the first three games of a series. The Red Wings made the Stanley Cup Final for the second year in a row, and met the Penguins again in a rematch of the previous years Stanley Cup Final, this time with the Penguins winning the Stanley Cup in game seven, after leading the series and having two chances to defend their title after their game five win in Detroit.

On May 25, 2011, Rafalski announced his retirement from the NHL, walking away from the final year of his contract, citing knee and back injuries. Because Rafalski retired on an under-35 contract without being bought out, the move removed his cap hit for the 2011–12 season.

In the 11 NHL seasons that Rafalski played, his team qualified for the Stanley Cup playoffs every year. Consequently, Rafalski led all NHL players in playoff games played during the 2000s decade, with 142.

On January 3, 2014, the Florida Everblades of the ECHL signed Rafalski to a contract, his first return to professional hockey since his initial retirement. He expressed a desire to return to the NHL, but was released 18 days after he signed, once again citing back issues.

== International play ==
Medal record

Representing United States

Ice hockey

Olympic Games
Silver medal – second place	2002 Salt Lake City	
Silver medal – second place	2010 Vancouver	

World Junior Championships
Bronze medal – third place	1992 Germany	

Rafalski represented Team USA at the 2002 Winter Olympics, winning a silver medal as the U.S. lost to Canada in the finals.

Rafalski continued to represent the U.S. in international play, playing in both the 2004 World Cup of Hockey and the 2006 Winter Olympics.

Rafalski also played in the 2010 Winter Olympics, serving as alternate captain. He scored two goals and assisted on another in Team USA's 5–3 win over Canada in group-stage play, which ensured the United States would win their group and earn a bye to the quarter-finals. He finished third in the tournament in scoring (first among defensemen) with four goals and four assists. He was also named as the best defenseman of the tournament, as well as being named to the tournament all-star team. Unfortunately, his defensive mistake led to Canada's tournament-winning goal in overtime of the gold medal game.

== Awards and honors ==
Award	Year
All-WCHA Rookie Team	1992
All-WCHA First Team	1995
AHCA West First-Team All-American	1995
WCHA Defenseman of the Year	1995
Pekka Rautakallio trophy for best defenseman in the SM-liiga	1997, 1999
Matti Keinonen trophy for best +/- in the SM-liiga	1999
Kultainen kypärä award for best player in the SM-liiga	1999
SM-Liiga Champion	1998
NHL All-Rookie Team	2000
NHL Rookie of the Month	February 2000
Stanley Cup champion	2000, 2003, 2008
NHL All-Star	2002, 2004, 2007
USA Hockey Hall of Fame	2014

- Best Defenseman of the 2010 Winter Olympics hockey tournament
- All-star selection, 2010 Olympic hockey tournament
- Inducted into the United States Hockey Hall of Fame (2014)

== Personal life ==
Rafalski and his wife Felicity have three sons – Danny, born in June 1997; Evan, born in October 2000; and Matthew, born in June 2004.

Rafalski has a degree from the University of Wisconsin–Madison in Economics.

Speaking about his retirement, Rafalski said, "This was probably the most challenging season of my career, both physically, mentally and spiritually, but it was also the most rewarding and most blessed...The decision was made between myself and my wife approximately two months ago. We went through a long process of weighing different factors in our lives. At the end of the day it came down to priorities, with the top three priorities being serving God, serving my family and serving others."

== Career statistics ==
=== Regular season and playoffs ===
			Regular season					Playoffs
Season	Team	League	GP	G	A	Pts	PIM	GP	G	A	Pts	PIM
1989–90	Melvindale Blades	NAHL	—	—	—	—	—	—	—	—	—	—
1990–91	Madison Capitols	USHL	47	12	11	23	28	—	—	—	—	—
1991–92	University of Wisconsin–Madison	WCHA	34	3	14	17	34	—	—	—	—	—
1992–93	University of Wisconsin–Madison	WCHA	32	0	13	13	10	—	—	—	—	—
1993–94	University of Wisconsin–Madison	WCHA	37	6	17	23	26	—	—	—	—	—
1994–95	University of Wisconsin–Madison	WCHA	43	11	34	45	48	—	—	—	—	—
1995–96	Brynäs IF	SEL	22	1	8	9	14	—	—	—	—	—
1995–96	Brynäs IF	Allsv	18	3	6	9	12	9	0	1	1	2
1996–97	HPK	SM-l	49	11	24	35	26	10	6	5	11	4
1997–98	HIFK	SM-l	40	13	10	23	24	9	5	6	11	0
1998–99	HIFK	SM-l	53	19	34	53	18	11	5	9	14	4
1999–00	New Jersey Devils	NHL	75	5	27	32	21	23	2	6	8	8
2000–01	New Jersey Devils	NHL	78	9	43	52	26	25	7	11	18	7
2001–02	New Jersey Devils	NHL	76	7	40	47	18	6	3	2	5	4
2002–03	New Jersey Devils	NHL	79	3	37	40	14	23	2	9	11	18
2003–04	New Jersey Devils	NHL	69	6	30	36	24	5	0	1	1	0
2005–06	New Jersey Devils	NHL	82	6	43	49	36	9	1	8	9	2
2006–07	New Jersey Devils	NHL	82	8	47	55	34	11	2	6	8	8
2007–08	Detroit Red Wings	NHL	73	13	42	55	34	22	4	10	14	12
2008–09	Detroit Red Wings	NHL	78	10	49	59	20	18	3	9	12	11
2009–10	Detroit Red Wings	NHL	78	8	34	42	26	12	3	8	11	2
2010–11	Detroit Red Wings	NHL	63	4	44	48	22	11	2	1	3	4
2013–14	Florida Everblades	ECHL	3	0	1	1	0	—	—	—	—	—
NHL totals			833	79	436	515	178	165	29	71	100	66

=== International ===
Year	Team	Event	GP	G	A	Pts	PIM
1992	United States	WJC	7	0	1	1	2
1993	United States	WJC	7	0	2	2	2
1995	United States	WC	5	0	0	0	2
2002	United States	OLY	6	1	2	3	2
2004	United States	WCH	4	0	3	3	6
2006	United States	OLY	5	0	2	2	0
2010	United States	OLY	6	4	4	8	2
Junior totals			14	0	3	3	4
Senior totals			26	5	11	16	12

Awards and achievements
Preceded by Shawn Reid	WCHA Defensive Player of the Year; 1994–95	Succeeded by Eric Rud
Preceded by Mika Strömberg	Winner of the Pekka Rautakallio trophy 1996–97	Succeeded by Allan Measures
Preceded by Allan Measures	Winner of the Pekka Rautakallio trophy 1998–99	Succeeded by Toni Lydman
Preceded by Raimo Helminen	Winner of the Kultainen kypärä trophy 1998–99	Succeeded by Kai Nurminen
Preceded by Olli Jokinen	Winner of the Matti Keinonen trophy 1998–99	Succeeded by Kai Nurminen
