= Tuulola =

Tuulola is a Finnish surname. Notable people with the surname include:

- Eetu Tuulola (born 1998), Finnish ice hockey player
- Joni Tuulola (born 1996), Finnish ice hockey player
- Marko Tuulola (born 1971), Finnish ice hockey player
