= Marko Tuulola =

Finnish ice hockey player

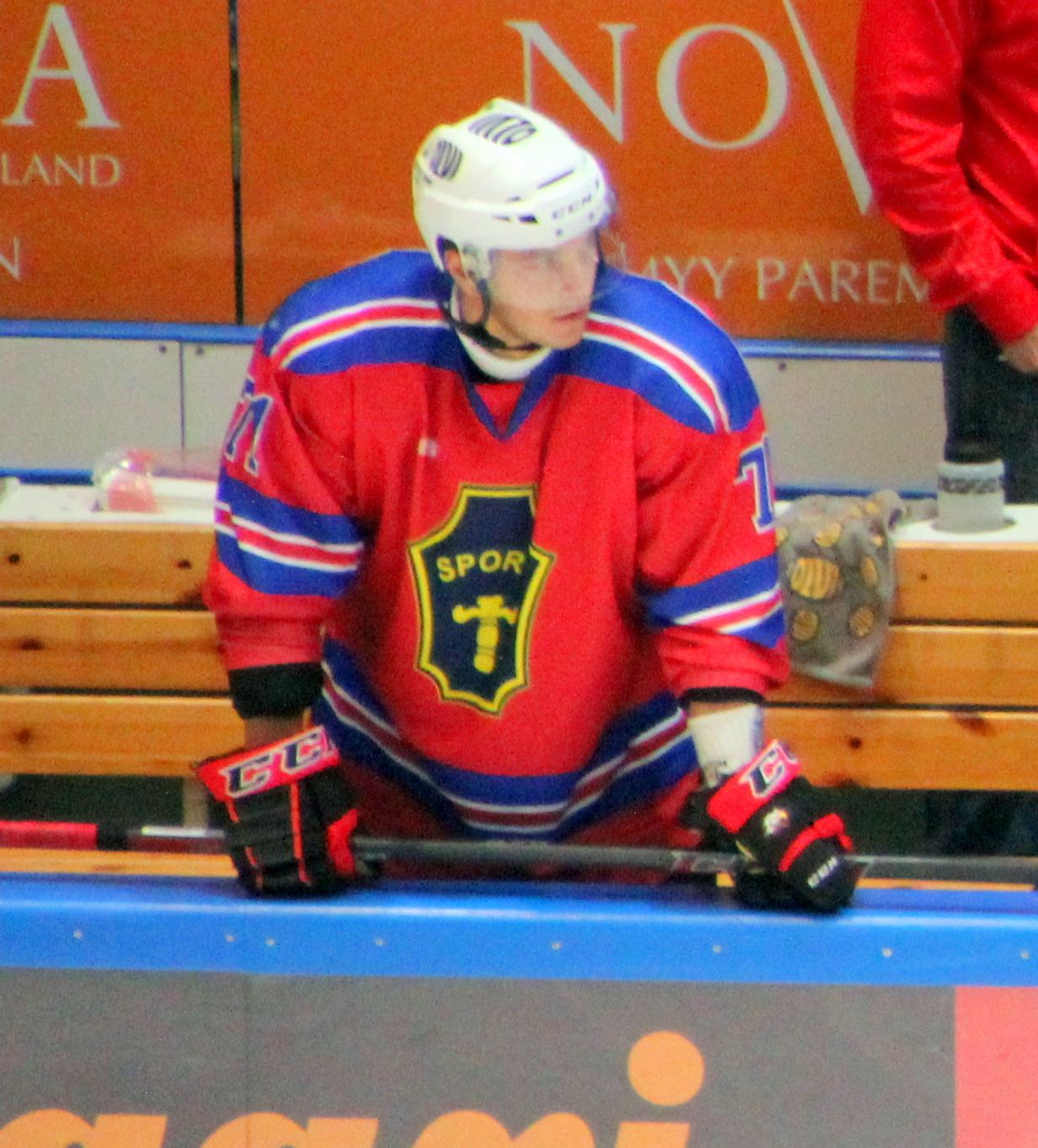
- Born: 7 February 1971 (age 55) Hämeenlinna, FIN
- Height: 6 ft 0 in (183 cm)
- Weight: 205 lb (93 kg; 14 st 9 lb)
- Position: Defence
- Shot: Left
- Played for: HPK; Lukko; Jokerit; Brynäs IF; SC Rapperswil-Jona Lakers
- National team: Finland
- Playing career: 1989–2014

Marko Tuulola (born 7 February 1971) is a retired Finnish professional ice hockey defenceman.

== Career ==
Tuulola played in the SM-liiga for HPK, Lukko and Jokerit. He also played in the Swedish Elitserien for Brynäs IF and in the Swiss Nationalliga A for SC Rapperswil-Jona Lakers. In 2003, he won the Pekka Rautakallio trophy for the best defenceman in the SM-liiga.

Tuulola was a member of the Finland national team for the 2002 IIHF World Championship.

== Career statistics ==
=== Regular season and playoffs ===
			Regular season					Playoffs
Season	Team	League	GP	G	A	Pts	PIM	GP	G	A	Pts	PIM
1988–89	HPK	FIN.2 U20	22	3	5	8	12	—	—	—	—	—
1989–90	HPK	FIN.2 U20	21	11	12	23	26	—	—	—	—	—
1989–90	HPK	SM-l	15	0	1	1	0	—	—	—	—	—
1990–91	HPK	FIN.2 U20	14	4	13	17	4	12	2	14	16	33
1990–91	HPK	SM-l	14	0	0	0	0	6	0	0	0	0
1991–92	HPK	FIN U20	4	1	3	4	4	—	—	—	—	—
1991–92	HPK	SM-l	44	1	10	11	10	—	—	—	—	—
1992–93	HPK	SM-l	48	3	9	12	18	12	2	2	4	4
1993–94	Lukko	SM-l	46	4	14	18	47	9	0	2	2	0
1994–95	Lukko	SM-l	46	7	14	21	34	9	1	3	4	6
1995–96	Jokerit	SM-l	50	2	18	20	16	11	2	5	7	12
1996–97	Jokerit	SM-l	47	2	12	14	43	9	0	5	5	2
1997–98	Jokerit	SM-l	47	3	20	23	47	8	0	4	4	10
1998–99	Brynäs IF	SEL	49	4	16	20	57	13	1	6	7	33
1999–2000	Brynäs IF	SEL	49	10	17	27	51	11	1	1	2	12
2000–01	Brynäs IF	SEL	44	8	14	22	95	4	1	0	1	8
2001–02	HPK	SM-l	55	6	34	40	40	8	0	2	2	4
2002–03	HPK	SM-l	55	9	33	42	58	13	3	3	6	4
2003–04	HPK	SM-l	54	7	23	30	49	8	0	3	3	4
2004–05	SC Rapperswil–Jona	NLA	35	7	16	23	28	4	1	2	3	0
2004–05	EHC Basel	SUI.2	—	—	—	—	—	10	0	4	4	8
2005–06	Rapperswil–Jona Lakers	NLA	42	4	23	27	46	12	0	8	8	28
2006–07	Jokerit	SM-l	54	7	29	36	106	10	0	5	5	2
2007–08	Jokerit	SM-l	35	2	6	8	12	14	1	5	6	0
2008–09	HPK	SM-l	58	1	19	20	32	6	0	1	1	6
2009–10	HPK	SM-l	57	8	18	26	89	17	1	4	5	18
2010–11	HPK	SM-l	59	2	26	28	24	2	0	2	2	0
2011–12	HPK	SM-l	60	6	14	20	60	—	—	—	—	—
2012–13	HPK	Liiga	59	4	11	15	59	5	0	2	2	2
2013–14	HPK	Liiga	39	2	8	10	26	6	0	1	1	2
SM-l/Liiga totals			942	76	319	395	770	153	10	49	59	76
SEL totals			142	22	47	69	203	28	3	7	10	53

=== International ===
Year	Team	Event	GP	G	A	Pts	PIM
2002	Finland	WC	9	1	1	2	0
Senior totals			9	1	1	2	0

== Achievements ==
- Pekka Rautakallio trophy for best defenseman in the SM-liiga - 2003

Preceded by Tom Koivisto	Winner of the Pekka Rautakallio trophy 2002-03	Succeeded by Toni Söderholm
