= Petteri Nummelin =

Finnish ice hockey player (born 1972)

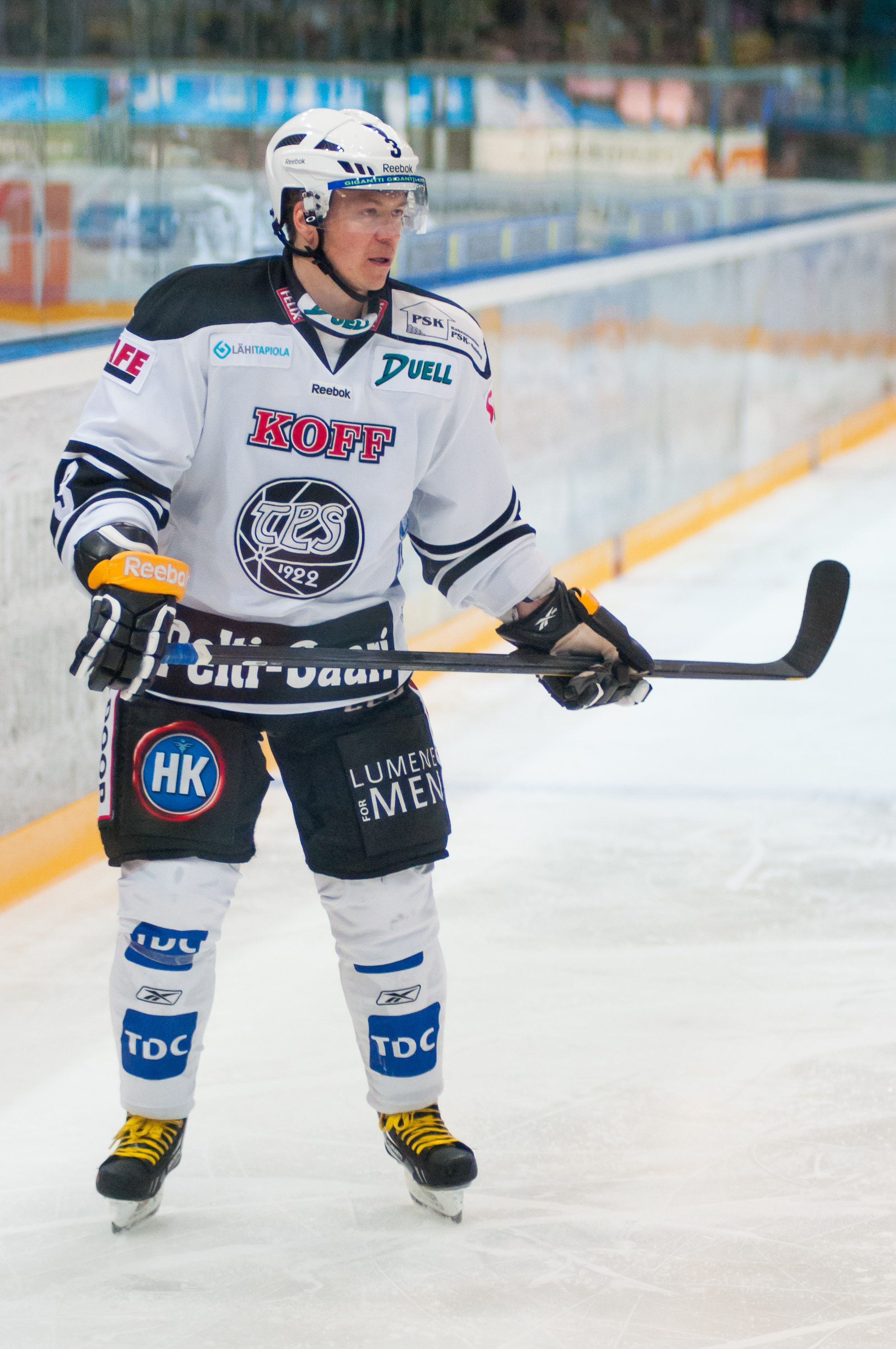
- Born: November 25, 1972 (age 53) Turku, Finland
- Height: 5 ft 10 in (178 cm)
- Weight: 188 lb (85 kg; 13 st 6 lb)
- Position: Defence
- Shot: Left
- Played for: TPS; Reipas; Västra Frölunda HC; Davos; Columbus Blue Jackets; Lugano; Minnesota Wild; Lukko; Storhamar; TUTO Hockey; Nikko Icebucks
- National team: Finland
- NHL draft: 133rd overall, 2000; Columbus Blue Jackets
- Playing career: 1992–2018

Medal record

Representing Finland

Men's ice hockey

European Junior Championships
Bronze medal – third place	1989 Soviet Union	

World Championships
Gold medal – first place	1995 Sweden	
Silver medal – second place	1998 Switzerland	
Silver medal – second place	1999 Norway	
Silver medal – second place	2001 Germany	
Silver medal – second place	2007 Russia	
Bronze medal – third place	2000 Russia	
Bronze medal – third place	2006 Latvia	

Olympic Games
Silver medal – second place	2006 Turin	

Timo Petteri Nummelin (born November 25, 1972) is a Finnish former professional ice hockey defenceman who played in the National Hockey League for the Minnesota Wild and Columbus Blue Jackets. He was drafted by the Columbus Blue Jackets as their fifth-round pick, #133 overall, in the 2000 NHL entry draft. Internationally, he played for the Finland men's national ice hockey team, and was inducted into the IIHF Hall of Fame in 2024.

Nummelin is the son of Timo Nummelin, a Finnish ice hockey hall of famer.

== Playing career ==
=== Career in Finland ===
Petteri Nummelin started playing ice hockey in his hometown Turku and played for a-junior team of TPS for 3 seasons after which he played for Kiekko-67 in the 1. Division. Nummelin debuted in the SM-Liiga during the 1992–93 Season which he spent playing partly for TPS and Reipas. Nummelin also played in Kiekko-67 and TPS A-Junior team during the season. After the 1992–93 season Nummelin stayed in TPS for 2 more seasons (93–95) and moved to play in Sweden after winning the world championship for Finland.

=== Career in Sweden ===
After successful World Championship tournament in 1995 Nummelin attracted some international publicity and was contracted by Frölunda HC, a Swedish team playing in the Elitserien. Nummelin spent total of 2 seasons in Sweden.

=== Career in Switzerland ===
In 1997 Nummelin joined HC Davos, one of the most successful Swiss teams to date. Nummelin played in HC Davos for 3 seasons (1997–2000) during the time Nummelin established himself as a star in Switzerland and at the end of the 1999–2000 season Nummelin received an offer from the NHL. Nummelin Played in NHL for Columbus Blue Jackets for the 2000–2001 season and returned to Switzerland and joined HC Lugano for the 2001–2002 season. Nummelin played in Lugano for 5 seasons (2001–06) and won several honors during that time, such as the overall scoring title in 2004 and the Swiss championship in 2003 and 2006. He returned to HC Lugano for the 2008–2009 season.

=== Career in Japan ===
In 2017 Nummelin signed a contract with the Nikkō Ice Bucks, and plays in the Asian Ice Hockey League.

Announced via the Nikkō Ice Bucks, Nummelin ended his career in Japan.

=== NHL career ===
Nummelin first played for one season in the NHL during the 2000–2001 NHL season for the Columbus Blue Jackets. In 2006, after spending 5 seasons in Switzerland, Nummelin returned to the NHL and signed with the Minnesota Wild, partially due to the strong encouragement of Minnesota Wild teammate, fellow countryman and friend Mikko Koivu, whom he babysat as a child. Known as Nummy by fans and Petu on the ice, Nummelin enjoyed a resurgence in his NHL career in the early stages of the 2006–07 NHL season.

Although Nummelin displayed both strong offensive and defensive contributions during regulation play, many consider his strongest asset his ability to score in the overtime shootout. As of 7 December 2006, Nummelin converted six shootout goals in all six of his attempts, beating some of the NHL's best goalies including Nikolai Khabibulin, Roberto Luongo and Vezina winner Miikka Kiprusoff. Nummelin's success is credited to what Wild fans have dubbed "The Shoulder Shake," a deke in which Nummelin shifts his shoulders back and forth without actually moving the puck, forcing the goaltender to move first, Nummelin then reacts to the goalie's movement putting the puck in the net with the backhand or forehand. Nummelin's opportunity in the shootout initially came as a shock to fans and teammates when Minnesota Wild head coach Jacques Lemaire listed him third in the shootout lineup against the Vancouver Canucks on 10 October 2006, in the place normally given to Marian Gaborik (the first three shooters are often reserved for the team's best goal scorers). Nummelin's conversion was the deciding goal to end the shootout and win the game for the Wild. Nummelin is currently the all-time NHL shoot-out conversion leader for players with more than two attempts, with a rate of 80% (8 for 10).

After the 2007–08 NHL season, Nummelin's contract with the Wild expired, and at 35 years of age he signed a 3-year contract with his former Swiss team HC Lugano.

== International career ==
Nummelin debuted with the Finland national team in the 1995 Ice Hockey World Championships where Finland won their first gold medal and has since represented his country in each consecutive year except 2008 and 2011. His total tournaments played count up to 15, an all-time record for most appearances in World Championships, which he held alone until 2013 when Mathias Seger tied this record.

== Awards and achievements ==
- Pekka Rautakallio trophy for best defenceman in the SM-liiga – 1994
- World record holder in Ice Hockey World Championship tournaments played (15)
- Best defenceman of World Championship tournament 2000 and 2010
- In World Championship all-star team 2000, 2001, 2006, 2007 and 2010
- Inducted into the player category of the IIHF Hall of Fame during the medal ceremony of the 2024 IIHF World Championship.

== Career statistics ==
=== Regular season and playoffs ===
			Regular season					Playoffs
Season	Team	League	GP	G	A	Pts	PIM	GP	G	A	Pts	PIM
1988–89	TPS	FIN U18	9	4	10	14	12	—	—	—	—	—
1988–89	TPS	FIN U20	11	2	3	5	2	—	—	—	—	—
1989–90	TPS	FIN U20	21	2	7	9	20	—	—	—	—	—
1990–91	TPS	FIN U20	35	20	16	36	28	—	—	—	—	—
1990–91	Kiekko–67	FIN.2	2	0	2	2	4	—	—	—	—	—
1991–92	Kiekko–67	FIN U20	13	16	15	31	28	—	—	—	—	—
1991–92	Kiekko–67	FIN.2	41	12	24	36	36	—	—	—	—	—
1992–93	TPS	FIN U20	1	1	0	1	0	—	—	—	—	—
1992–93	TPS	SM-l	3	0	0	0	8	—	—	—	—	—
1992–93	Kiekko–67	FIN.2	28	14	15	29	18	—	—	—	—	—
1992–93	Reipas Lahti	SM-l	14	3	4	7	18	—	—	—	—	—
1993–94	TPS	SM-l	44	14	24	38	20	11	0	3	3	4
1994–95	TPS	SM-l	48	10	17	27	32	11	4	3	7	0
1995–96	Västra Frölunda HC	SEL	32	7	11	18	26	12	2	7	9	4
1996–97	Västra Frölunda HC	SEL	44	20	14	34	39	2	0	1	1	0
1997–98	HC Davos	NDA	33	13	17	30	24	17	8	14	22	2
1998–99	HC Davos	NDA	44	11	42	53	22	4	0	2	2	2
1999–2000	HC Davos	NLA	40	15	23	38	20	5	0	3	3	0
2000–01	Columbus Blue Jackets	NHL	61	4	12	16	10	—	—	—	—	—
2001–02	HC Lugano	NLA	34	5	19	24	6	13	6	8	14	2
2002–03	HC Lugano	NLA	43	18	39	57	12	8	3	7	10	2
2003–04	HC Lugano	NLA	48	20	39	59	59	16	7	20	27	4
2004–05	HC Lugano	NLA	36	13	36	49	18	3	1	0	1	2
2005–06	HC Lugano	NLA	38	13	32	45	22	17	8	25	33	10
2006–07	Minnesota Wild	NHL	51	3	17	20	22	3	1	1	2	0
2007–08	Minnesota Wild	NHL	27	2	7	9	2	4	0	1	1	0
2008–09	HC Lugano	NLA	41	21	39	60	16	7	4	5	9	2
2009–10	HC Lugano	NLA	34	7	16	23	10	4	0	3	3	2
2010–11	HC Lugano	NLA	29	3	15	18	18	—	—	—	—	—
2011–12	HC Lugano	NLA	36	7	24	31	20	6	0	1	1	2
2012–13	TPS	SM-l	8	3	1	4	2	—	—	—	—	—
2012–13	HC Lugano	NLA	11	4	5	9	0	—	—	—	—	—
2013–14	Lukko	Liiga	37	5	17	22	6	10	3	7	10	2
2014–15	TPS	Liiga	16	2	8	10	31	—	—	—	—	—
2015–16	TPS	Liiga	27	5	14	19	2	5	1	2	3	0
2016–17	Storhamar Dragons	NOR	17	3	10	13	14	—	—	—	—	—
2016–17	TUTO Hockey	Mestis	5	1	4	5	0	10	3	5	8	2
2017–18	Nikkō Ice Bucks	ALH	27	3	20	23	18	3	1	1	2	0
2018–19	PKS	FIN.6	2	1	3	4	0	—	—	—	—	—
SM-l/Liiga totals			197	42	85	127	119	37	8	15	23	6
NDA/NLA totals			467	150	346	496	247	100	37	88	125	30
NHL totals			139	9	36	45	34	7	1	2	3	0

=== International ===
Year	Team	Event	GP	G	A	Pts	PIM
1990	Finland	EJC	6	1	1	2	18
1992	Finland	WJC	6	0	1	1	4
1995	Finland	WC	5	0	0	0	6
1996	Finland	WC	5	0	0	0	2
1996	Finland	WCH	1	0	0	0	2
1997	Finland	WC	8	0	2	2	10
1998	Finland	WC	1	0	0	0	0
1999	Finland	WC	10	0	0	0	4
2000	Finland	WC	9	2	4	6	0
2001	Finland	WC	9	1	12	13	0
2002	Finland	WC	7	1	0	1	2
2003	Finland	WC	7	2	2	4	4
2004	Finland	WC	7	2	2	4	2
2005	Finland	WC	7	0	2	2	0
2006	Finland	OLY	8	0	2	2	2
2006	Finland	WC	9	3	11	14	2
2007	Finland	WC	7	3	5	8	4
2009	Finland	WC	5	0	3	3	0
2010	Finland	WC	6	1	6	7	0
Junior totals			12	1	2	3	22
Senior totals			111	15	51	66	40

Preceded by Erik Hämäläinen	Winner of the Pekka Rautakallio trophy 1993–1994	Succeeded by Mika Strömberg
