= Ilkka Mikkola =

Finnish ice hockey player

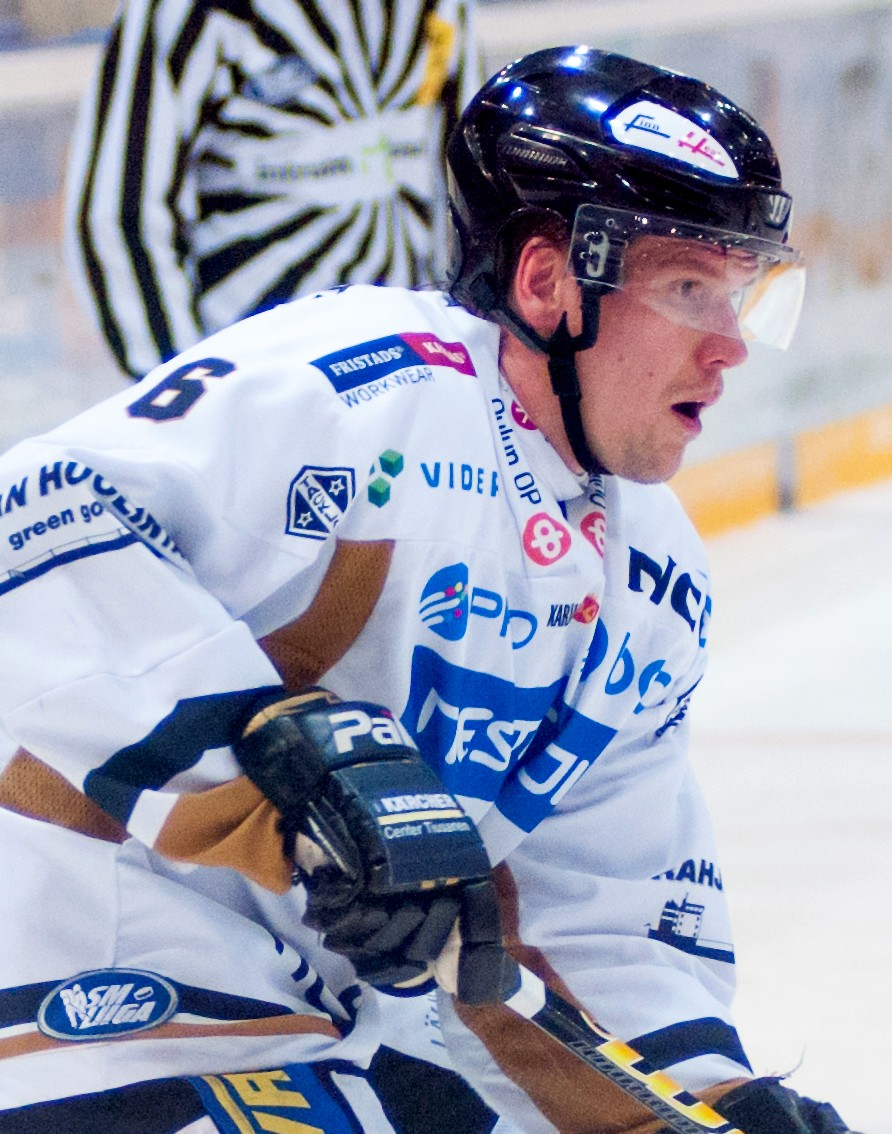
- Born: 18 January 1979 (age 47) Kiiminki, Finland
- Height: 5 ft 11 in (180 cm)
- Weight: 194 lb (88 kg; 13 st 12 lb)
- Position: Defenceman
- Shot: Left
- Played for: Oulun Kärpät; TPS; Jokerit; Lukko
- NHL draft: 65th overall, 1997; Montreal Canadiens
- Playing career: 1996–2017

Ilkka Mikkola (born 18 January 1979) is a Finnish former professional ice hockey defenceman who most notably played for Oulun Kärpät of the Finnish Liiga.

== Playing career ==
In the time of his 12 seasons in league, Mikkola has won eight championships, which is more than any active player in the league. In the 2004–2005 SM-liiga season, Mikkola was the best defenceman of the league and was also chosen to the SM-liiga All Star-game. Of the eight championships he has won four with Kärpät, one with Jokerit and three with TPS.

Including the eight championships in SM-liiga, Mikkola has also won gold medal in 1998 World Junior Ice Hockey Championships. He has also won silver medal in U18 European Championships. Mikkola was drafted to NHL by Montreal Canadiens in third round as 65th overall in 1997 NHL entry draft.

== Awards and honours ==
Award	Year
Liiga
All-Star Team	2005
Pekka Rautakallio Trophy	2005

Oulun Kärpät retired Mikkola's number "6" in 2021.

== Career statistics ==
=== Regular season and playoffs ===
			Regular season					Playoffs
Season	Team	League	GP	G	A	Pts	PIM	GP	G	A	Pts	PIM
1995–96	Kärpät	FIN U18	4	2	0	2	0	—	—	—	—	—
1995–96	Kärpät	FIN U20	21	2	3	5	20	—	—	—	—	—
1995–96	Kärpät	FIN.2	10	0	4	4	29	2	0	0	0	2
1996–97	Kärpät	FIN U18	1	0	1	1	2	—	—	—	—	—
1996–97	Kärpät	FIN U20	2	0	1	1	0	—	—	—	—	—
1996–97	Kärpät	FIN.2	40	7	12	19	30	9	0	0	0	4
1997–98	Kärpät	FIN U20	4	3	2	5	6	—	—	—	—	—
1997–98	Kärpät	FIN.2	28	2	7	9	34	14	1	3	4	16
1998–99	TPS	SM-l	42	1	3	4	41	10	1	0	1	6
1999–2000	TPS	SM-l	54	2	6	8	48	11	0	0	0	6
2000–01	TPS	SM-l	37	3	6	9	22	10	0	1	1	4
2001–02	Jokerit	SM-l	55	3	2	5	14	12	1	3	4	6
2002–03	Jokerit	SM-l	38	4	10	14	8	10	0	1	1	10
2003–04	Kärpät	SM-l	52	3	13	16	22	15	0	2	2	8
2004–05	Kärpät	SM-l	45	4	16	20	44	12	2	4	6	8
2005–06	Kärpät	SM-l	51	7	12	19	48	11	0	3	3	22
2006–07	Kärpät	SM-l	55	8	16	24	94	10	0	0	0	8
2007–08	Kärpät	SM-l	49	3	24	27	60	13	0	9	9	10
2008–09	Kärpät	SM-l	57	8	14	22	78	15	3	5	8	10
2009–10	Kärpät	SM-l	52	3	12	15	48	10	1	3	4	10
2010–11	Kärpät	SM-l	56	3	20	23	38	3	0	0	0	4
2011–12	Kärpät	SM-l	57	4	18	22	58	9	0	3	3	10
2012–13	Kärpät	SM-l	52	1	16	17	50	3	0	0	0	2
2013–14	Lukko	Liiga	60	6	27	33	85	15	1	4	5	8
2014–15	Lukko	Liiga	55	2	10	12	44	14	0	6	6	12
2015–16	Lukko	Liiga	43	3	11	14	38	5	1	1	2	4
2016–17	Kärpät	Liiga	58	1	9	10	58	2	0	0	0	0
SM-l/Liiga totals			968	69	245	314	898	190	10	45	55	148

=== International ===
Year	Team	Event	GP	G	A	Pts	PIM
1995	Finland	U17
1996	Finland	EJC	4	0	0	0	4
1997	Finland	WJC	6	0	0	0	2
1997	Finland	EJC	6	2	5	7	4
1998	Finland	WJC	7	0	0	0	0
1999	Finland	WJC	6	1	6	7	33
Junior totals			29	3	11	14	43
