= Jouni Loponen =

Finnish ice hockey player

Jouni Loponen (born 1 July 1971) is a Finnish ice hockey defender. He played for the Spokane Chiefs in 1988–89, he is a 4-times Finnish champion and in 2004, he won Elitserien.

== Career statistics ==
| | | | Regular season | | | | | Playoffs |
| Season | Team | League | GP | G | A | Pts | PIM | GP | G | A | Pts | PIM |
|---|---|---|---|---|---|---|---|---|---|---|---|---|
| 1988–89 | Spokane Chiefs | WHL | 8 | 0 | 2 | 2 | 2 | — | — | — | — | — |
| 1988–89 | Camrose Lutheran College | ACAC | 12 | 0 | 5 | 5 | 8 | — | — | — | — | — |
| 1990–91 | Kärpät | FIN U20 | 2 | 0 | 0 | 0 | 4 | — | — | — | — | — |
| 1990–91 | Kärpät | FIN.2 | 43 | 9 | 12 | 21 | 24 | — | — | — | — | — |
| 1991–92 | Kärpät | FIN.2 | 39 | 6 | 13 | 19 | 34 | 4 | 0 | 1 | 1 | 2 |
| 1992–93 | Kärpät | FIN.2 | 44 | 8 | 21 | 29 | 16 | — | — | — | — | — |
| 1993–94 | Kärpät | FIN.2 | 45 | 10 | 18 | 28 | 42 | — | — | — | — | — |
| 1994–95 | JYP | SM-l | 42 | 4 | 7 | 11 | 38 | 4 | 0 | 1 | 1 | 4 |
| 1995–96 | JYP | SM-l | 48 | 5 | 15 | 20 | 50 | — | — | — | — | — |
| 1996–97 | HV71 | SEL | 49 | 8 | 13 | 21 | 32 | 5 | 1 | 2 | 3 | 0 |
| 1997–98 | HV71 | SEL | 46 | 7 | 9 | 16 | 32 | — | — | — | — | — |
| 1998–99 | TPS | SM-l | 51 | 6 | 4 | 10 | 28 | 10 | 1 | 3 | 4 | 6 |
| 1999–2000 | TPS | SM-l | 50 | 5 | 16 | 21 | 18 | 11 | 2 | 5 | 7 | 2 |
| 2000–01 | TPS | SM-l | 51 | 9 | 19 | 28 | 30 | 10 | 2 | 7 | 9 | 6 |
| 2001–02 | HV71 | SEL | 40 | 7 | 11 | 18 | 14 | 8 | 1 | 3 | 4 | 0 |
| 2002–03 | HV71 | SEL | 49 | 6 | 16 | 22 | 34 | 7 | 0 | 0 | 0 | 2 |
| 2003–04 | HV71 | SEL | 49 | 5 | 10 | 15 | 40 | 18 | 3 | 6 | 9 | 14 |
| 2004–05 | HV71 | SEL | 11 | 1 | 1 | 2 | 6 | — | — | — | — | — |
| 2005–06 | Kärpät | SM-l | 48 | 4 | 11 | 15 | 50 | 11 | 0 | 1 | 1 | 10 |
| 2006–07 | Kärpät | SM-l | 46 | 2 | 15 | 17 | 60 | 10 | 0 | 2 | 2 | 8 |
| 2007–08 | Herning Blue Fox | DNK | 39 | 7 | 19 | 26 | 30 | 16 | 3 | 6 | 9 | 16 |
| FIN.2 totals | | | 171 | 33 | 64 | 97 | 116 | 4 | 0 | 1 | 1 | 2 |
| SM-l totals | | | 336 | 35 | 87 | 122 | 274 | 56 | 5 | 19 | 24 | 36 |
| SEL totals | | | 244 | 34 | 60 | 94 | 158 | 38 | 5 | 11 | 16 | 16 |
