= 2004–05 SM-liiga season =

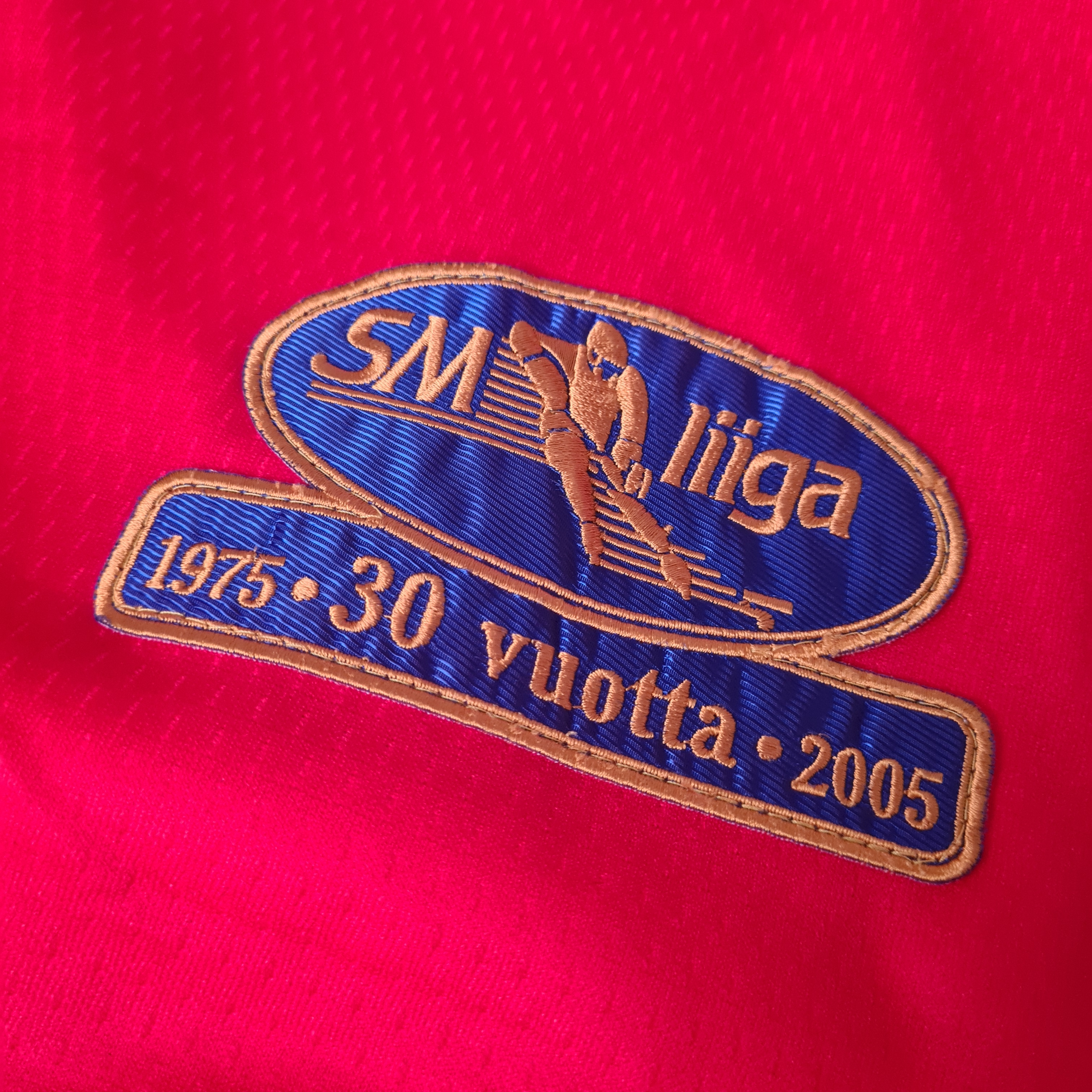
- SM-liiga's 30 year anniversary badge on a jersey
- TV partner: MTV3
- Finals champions: Oulun Kärpät
- Runners-up: Jokerit

SM-liiga seasons
- ← 2003–04 2005–06 →

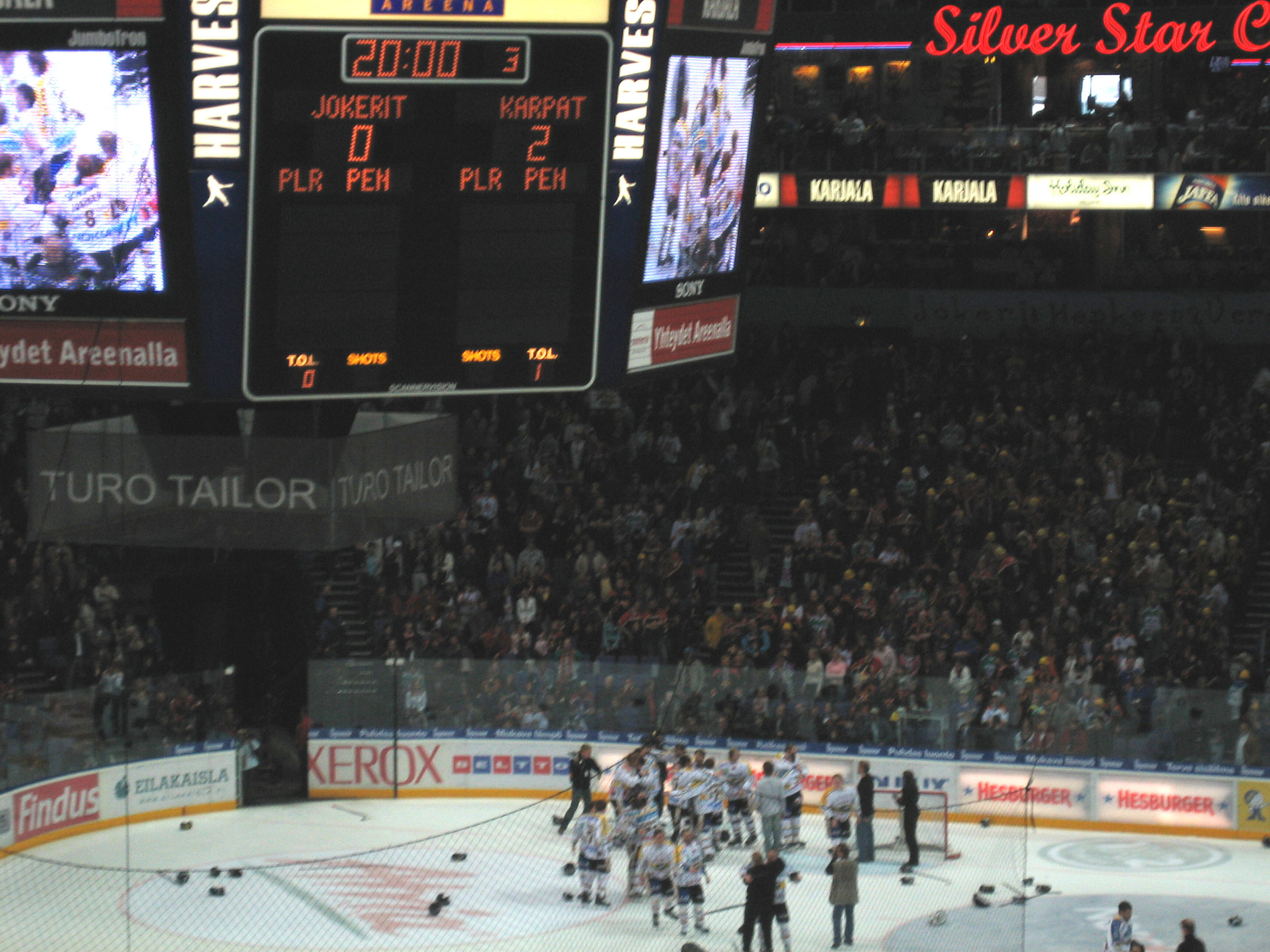
Kärpät celebrates 2-0 victory over Jokerit in the 2005 final.

The 2004–05 SM-liiga season was the 30th season of the SM-liiga, the top level of ice hockey in Finland. 13 teams participated in the league, and Kärpät Oulu won the championship.

== Regular season ==
| | Team | GP | W | OTW | OTL | L | GF | GA | Diff | Pts |
|---|---|---|---|---|---|---|---|---|---|---|
| 1 | Kärpät | 56 | 35 | 5 | 6 | 10 | 190 | 122 | +68 | 121 |
| 2 | Jokerit | 56 | 34 | 4 | 3 | 15 | 163 | 96 | +67 | 113 |
| 3 | HPK | 56 | 24 | 17 | 2 | 13 | 196 | 128 | +68 | 108 |
| 4 | HIFK | 56 | 29 | 5 | 7 | 15 | 162 | 116 | +46 | 104 |
| 5 | Lukko | 56 | 28 | 4 | 6 | 18 | 152 | 130 | +22 | 98 |
| 6 | TPS | 56 | 22 | 8 | 10 | 16 | 146 | 142 | +4 | 92 |
| 7 | Ilves | 56 | 22 | 6 | 8 | 20 | 164 | 179 | -15 | 86 |
| 8 | JYP | 56 | 23 | 2 | 7 | 24 | 147 | 148 | -1 | 80 |
| 9 | Tappara | 56 | 17 | 8 | 6 | 25 | 151 | 172 | -21 | 73 |
| 10 | Ässät | 56 | 15 | 8 | 6 | 27 | 140 | 178 | -38 | 67 |
| 11 | Blues | 56 | 15 | 5 | 6 | 30 | 139 | 159 | -20 | 61 |
| 12 | SaiPa | 56 | 11 | 7 | 5 | 33 | 145 | 195 | -50 | 52 |
| 13 | Pelicans | 56 | 7 | 3 | 10 | 36 | 100 | 230 | -130 | 37 |

Source: Elite Prospects

== Playoffs ==
=== Preliminary round ===
- Ilves - Ässät 2:0 (3:1, 4:1)
- JYP - Tappara 1:2 (6:4, 0:1, 0:4)

=== Quarterfinals ===
- Kärpät - Tappara 4:1 (2:0, 3:2, 0:1, 5:1, 6:2)
- Jokerit - Ilves 4:1 (5:2, 2:3, 7:1, 3:1, 4:1)
- HPK - TPS 4:2 (3:2, 2:3, 4:1, 2:3, 4:3, 3:0)
- HIFK - Lukko 1:4 (2:3 P, 0:3, 4:3 P, 0:2, 2:5)

=== Semifinals ===
- Kärpät - Lukko 3:0 (3:0, 3:1, 4:3)
- Jokerit - HPK 3:0 (5:3, 3:2, 4:1)

=== 3rd place ===
- HPK - Lukko 4:3 P

=== Final ===
- Kärpät - Jokerit 3:1 (3:2 P, 2:1, 1:2, 2:0)
