= 1996–97 SM-liiga season =

Finnish ice hockey season

The 1996–97 SM-liiga season was the 22nd season of the SM-liiga, the top level of ice hockey in Finland. 12 teams participated in the league, and Jokerit Helsinki won the championship.

== Standings ==
	Club	GP	W	T	L	GF	GA	Diff	Pts
1	Jokerit	50	35	4	11	192	116	+76	74
2	TPS	50	32	7	11	191	105	+86	71
3	HPK	50	28	7	15	191	143	+48	63
4	Ilves	50	26	7	17	183	147	+36	59
5	JYP	50	25	6	19	163	136	+27	56
6	Kiekko-Espoo	50	25	6	19	154	163	−9	51
7	Ässät	50	19	10	21	171	182	−11	48
8	Tappara	50	18	8	24	139	171	−32	44
9	HIFK	50	17	8	25	159	171	−12	42
10	Lukko	50	16	5	29	136	170	−34	37
11	SaiPa	50	13	8	29	118	181	−63	34
12	KalPa	50	8	5	37	116	228	−112	21

Source: Elite Prospects

== Playoffs ==
=== Quarterfinals ===
- Jokerit - Tappara 3:0 (3:1, 6:5 P, 4:0)
- TPS - Ässät 3:1 (1:3, 7:4, 6:3, 4:2)
- HPK - Kiekko-Espoo 3:1 (3:0, 4:3, 2:3, 4:3)
- Ilves - JYP 3:1 (4:2, 1:6, 4:1, 5:2)

=== Semifinal ===
- Jokerit - Ilves 3:0 (7:3, 2:1, 4:2)
- TPS - HPK 3:2 (1:4, 3:5, 5:4, 2:1 P, 6:2)

=== 3rd place ===
- HPK - Ilves 5:1

=== Final ===
- Jokerit - TPS 3:0 (3:2 P, 4:2, 4:0)

== Relegation ==
First round

- KalPa - Haukat 3–0 on series
- Kärpät - Karhut 3–0 on series

Final

- KalPa - Kärpät 3–0 on series
