= 1998–99 SM-liiga season =

Finnish ice hockey season

The 1998–99 SM-liiga season was the 24th season of the SM-liiga, the top level of ice hockey in Finland. 12 teams participated in the league, and TPS Turku won the championship.

== Standings ==
	Teams	GP	W	T	L	GF	GA	Diff	Pts
1	TPS	54	37	7	10	179	107	+72	81
2	HIFK	54	34	6	14	209	104	+105	74
3	Jokerit	54	31	3	20	171	140	+31	65
4	HPK	54	27	6	21	192	152	+40	60
5	Ilves	54	30	0	24	180	143	+37	60
6	SaiPa	54	25	4	25	141	153	-12	54
7	Blues	54	21	7	26	146	183	-37	49
8	JYP	54	22	4	28	137	157	-20	48
9	Tappara	54	21	6	27	148	196	-48	48
10	Ässät	54	20	6	28	152	178	-26	46
11	Lukko	54	16	7	31	126	176	-50	39
12	KalPa	54	9	6	39	95	187	-92	24

Source: Elite Prospects

== Playoffs ==
=== Quarterfinals ===
- TPS - JYP 3:0 (8:0, 3:2, 5:1)
- HIFK - Blues 3:1 (3:4, 2:1, 5:2, 3:2)
- Jokerit - SaiPa 0:3 (1:4, 3:4 P, 4:5)
- HPK - Ilves 3:1 (3:0, 5:4 P, 1:2, 5:4 P)

=== Semifinals ===
- TPS - SaiPa 3:0 (4:0, 3:1, 7:3)
- HIFK - HPK 3:0 (7:3, 4:2, 5:1)

=== 3rd place ===
- HPK - SaiPa 7:2

=== Final ===
- TPS - HIFK 3:1 (3:1, 2:7, 5:2, 1:0)

=== Scoring Leaders ===
#	Name	Team	Games played	Goals	Assists	Points
1.	Czech Republic Jan Čaloun	HIFK	51	24	57	81
2.	Finland Pasi Saarela	Jokerit	54	38	20	58
3.	Czech Republic Tomáš Vlasák	HPK	54	28	29	57
4.	United States Brian Rafalski	HIFK	53	19	34	53
5.	Sweden Peter Larsson	Ilves	54	20	32	52

== Qualification ==
=== 1st round ===
KalPa – TuTo
KalPa	TuTo	6–3
TuTo	KalPa	0–3
KalPa	TuTo	6–2
KalPa wins 3-0

Pelicans – Sport
Pelicans	Sport	3–1
Sport	Pelicans	0–3
Pelicans	Sport	2-1 OT
Pelicans wins 3-0

=== 2nd round ===
KalPa – Pelicans
KalPa	Pelicans	1–4
Pelicans	KalPa	3–1
KalPa	Pelicans	1–2
Pelicans wins 3-0
