= Finland men's national junior ice hockey team =

National sports team

Finland
- Nickname: Nuoret Leijonat (The Young Lions)
- Association: Finnish Ice Hockey Association
- General manager: (Finland) Kimmo Oikarinen
- Head coach: (Finland) Antti Pennanen
- Assistants: (Finland) Tuomo Ruutu (Finland) Antti Miettinen (Finland) Ville Mäntymaa
- Captain: Aron Kiviharju
- Top scorer: Esa Tikkanen (17)
- Most points: Esa Tikkanen (36)
- Team colors
- IIHF code: FIN
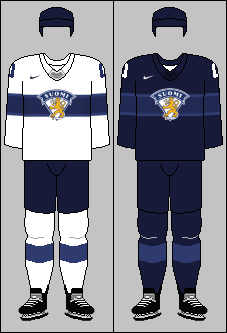

First international
- Soviet Union 6 – 2 Finland (Leningrad, Soviet Union; December 27, 1973)

Biggest win
- Finland 19 – 1 Switzerland (Helsinki, Finland; March 27, 1979)

Biggest defeat
- Sweden 9 – 2 Finland (Gävle, Sweden; January 2, 1993); Canada 8 – 1 Finland (Grand Forks, North Dakota, United States; December 27, 2004); Canada 8 – 1 Finland (Edmonton, Alberta, Canada; December 26, 2011)

IIHF World U20 Championship
- Appearances: 50 (first in 1977)
- Best result: Gold: (1987, 1998, 2014, 2016, 2019)

International record (W–L–T)
- 182–129–16

Medal record

IIHF World U20 Championship
Gold medal – first place	1987 Czechoslovakia	Finland
Gold medal – first place	1998 Finland	Finland
Gold medal – first place	2014 Sweden	Finland
Gold medal – first place	2016 Finland	Finland
Gold medal – first place	2019 Canada	Finland
Silver medal – second place	1974 Soviet Union	Finland
Silver medal – second place	1980 Finland	Finland
Silver medal – second place	1981 West Germany	Finland
Silver medal – second place	1984 Sweden	Finland
Silver medal – second place	2001 Russia	Finland
Silver medal – second place	2022 Canada	Finland
Silver medal – second place	2025 Canada	Finland
Bronze medal – third place	1982 USA/Canada	Finland
Bronze medal – third place	1988 Soviet Union	Finland
Bronze medal – third place	2002 Czech Republic	Finland
Bronze medal – third place	2003 Canada	Finland
Bronze medal – third place	2004 Finland	Finland
Bronze medal – third place	2006 Canada	Finland
Bronze medal – third place	2021 Canada	Finland

Medal record

Youth Olympic Games
Gold medal – first place	2012 Innsbruck	Team
Bronze medal – third place	2024 Gangwon	Team

The Finnish men's national under 20 ice hockey team is the national under-20 ice hockey team in Finland. The team represents Finland at the International Ice Hockey Federation's IIHF World U20 Championship.

== WJC 2025 roster ==
Roster for the 2025 World Junior Championships:

Position	Num.	Name	Club
GK	1	Kim Saarinen	(Finland) HPK (Liiga)
GK	30	Petteri Rimpinen	(Finland) Kiekko-Espoo (Liiga)
GK	31	Noa Vali	(Finland) HC TPS (Liiga)
D	2	Mitja Jokinen	(Finland) HC TPS (Liiga)
D	3	Kalle Kangas	(Finland) HPK (Liiga)
D	6	Sebastian Soini	(Finland) Ilves (Liiga)
D	7	Daniel Nieminen	(Finland) Pelicans Lahti (Liiga)
D	10	Emil Pieniniemi (A)	(Canada) Kingston Frontenacs (OHL)
D	13	Veeti Väisänen	(Canada) Medicine Hat Tigers (WHL)
D	33	Aron Kiviharju (C)	(Finland) HIFK (Liiga)
D	35	Arttu Tuhkala	(Sweden) Luleå HF (SHL)
F	12	Joona Saarelainen	(Finland) KalPa (Liiga)
F	15	Tuomas Uronen	(Canada) Kingston Frontenacs (OHL)
F	18	Rasmus Kumpulainen (A)	(Finland) Pelicans Lahti (Liiga)
F	19	Konsta Helenius	(United States) Rochester Americans (AHL)
F	21	Topias Hynninen	(Finland) Jukurit (Liiga)
F	22	Kasper Halttunen (A)	(Canada) London Knights (OHL)
F	23	Roope Vesterinen	(Finland) HPK (Liiga)
F	24	Jesse Nurmi	(Canada) London Knights (OHL)
F	27	Julius Miettinen	(United States) Everett Silvertips (WHL)
F	28	Heikki Ruohonen	(United States) Dubuque Fighting Saints (USHL)
F	29	Arttu Alasiurua	(Finland) Kärpät (Liiga)
F	32	Emil Hemming	(Canada) Barrie Colts (OHL)
F	37	Benjamin Rautiainen	(Finland) Tappara (Liiga)
F	38	Jesse Kiiskinen (A)	(Finland) HPK (Liiga)

== Youth Olympic Games record ==
Year	GP	W	L	T	GF	GA	Pts	Rank
(Austria) 2012 Innsbruck	6	4	2	0	17	13	7	(gold) Gold
(Norway) 2016 Lillehammer	6	1	5	0	19	21	4	4th
(Switzerland) 2020 Lausanne	4	1	3	0	10	22	3	4th
(South Korea) 2024 Gangwon	4	2*	2	0	10	12	5	(bronze) Bronze
(Italy) 2028 Dolomites / Valtellina	Future event							

== World Junior Championship record ==
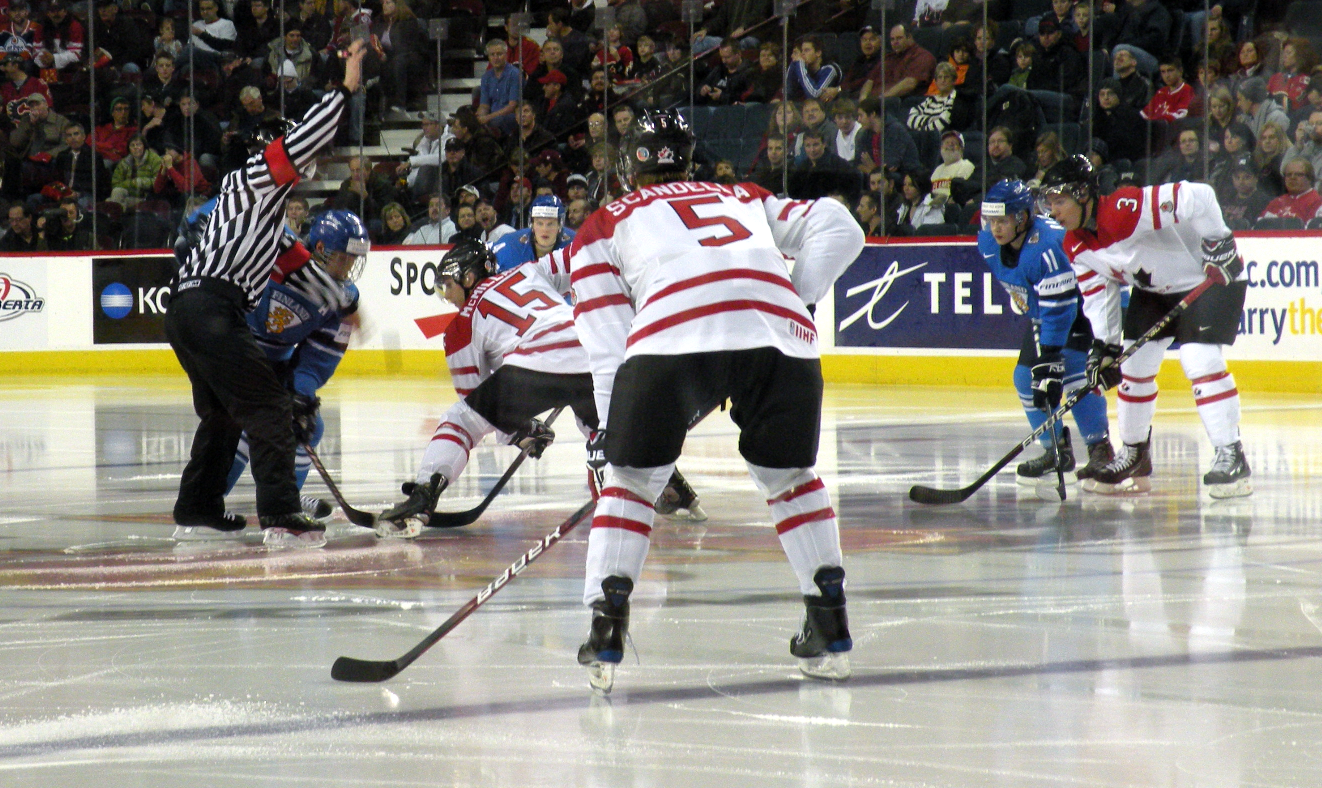
The Canadians U20 face off against the Finnish U20 team at an exhibition game in Calgary 2012

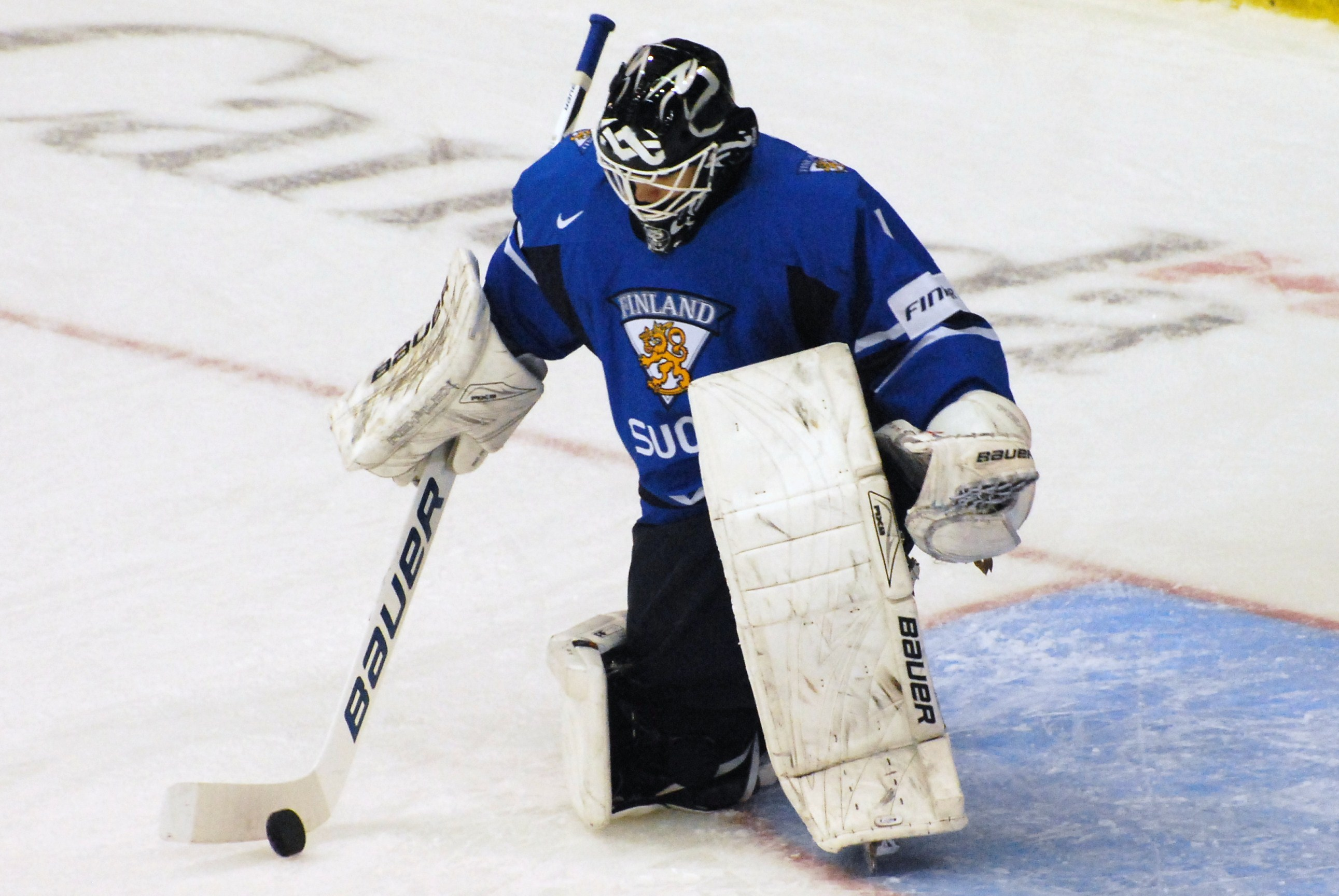
Joni Ortio

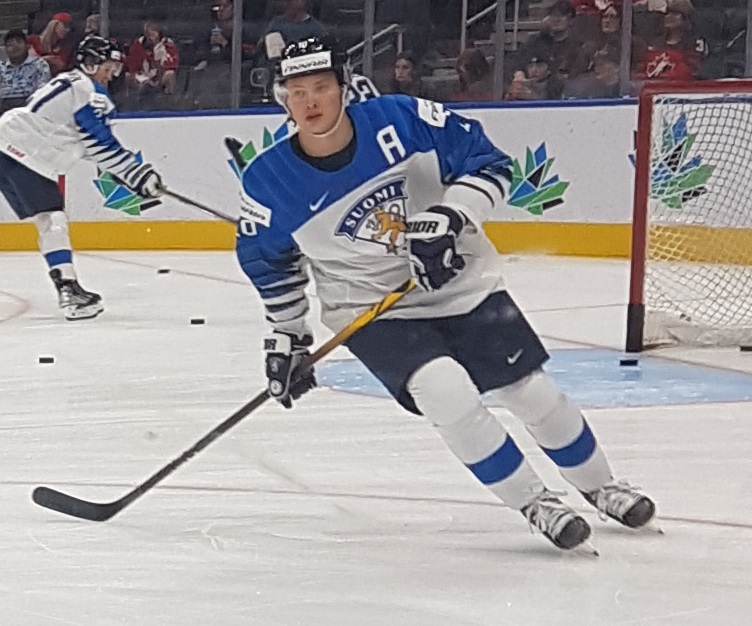
Finnish U20 team in 2022

Year	GP	W	L	T	GF	GA	Pts	Rank
(Soviet Union) 1974 Leningrad	5	3	2	0	21	23	6	(silver) Silver
(Canada) / (United States) 1975 Winnipeg and Brandon / Minneapolis, Bloomington and Fargo	5	1	3	1	10	14	3	5th
(Finland) 1976 Tampere, Turku, Pori and Rauma	4	1	3	0	12	14	2	4th
(Czechoslovakia) 1977 Banská Bystrica and Zvolen	7	4	3	0	35	29	8	4th
(Canada) 1978 Montreal and Quebec City	6	3	2	1	45	25	7	6th
(Sweden) 1979 Karlstad and Karlskoga	6	2	4	0	20	19	4	4th
(Finland) 1980 Helsinki and Vantaa	5	4	1	0	29	8	8	(silver) Silver
(West Germany) 1981 Füssen and Landsberg	5	3	1	1	29	18	7	(silver) Silver
(United States) / (Canada) 1982 Minnesota / Manitoba and Ontario	7	5	2	0	47	29	10	(bronze) Bronze
(Soviet Union) 1983 Leningrad	7	3	4	0	35	29	6	6th
(Sweden) 1984 Norrköping and Nyköping	7	6	1	0	44	21	12	(silver) Silver
(Finland) 1985 Turku and Helsinki	7	4	1	2	42	20	9	4th
(Canada) 1986 Mainly in Hamilton, Ontario	7	3	4	0	31	23	6	6th
(Czechoslovakia) 1987 Piešťany, Trenčín, Nitra, and Topoľčany	7	5	1	1	45	23	11	(gold) Gold
(Soviet Union) 1988 Moscow	7	5	1	1	36	20	11	(bronze) Bronze
(United States) 1989 Anchorage and Alaska	7	2	4	1	29	37	5	6th
(Finland) 1990 Held mainly in Helsinki	7	4	2	1	32	21	9	4th
(Canada) 1991 Held in various communities in Saskatchewan	7	3	3	1	35	30	7	5th
(Germany) 1992 Füssen and Kaufbeuren	7	3	3	1	22	21	7	4th
(Sweden) 1993 Held mainly in Gävle	7	3	3	1	31	20	7	5th
(Czech Republic) 1994 Ostrava and Frýdek-Místek	7	4	3	0	27	24	8	4th
(Canada) 1995 Held mainly in Red Deer, Alberta	7	3	3	1	29	26	7	4th
(United States) 1996 Massachusetts	6	2	4	0	23	24	4	6th
(Switzerland) 1997 Geneva and Morges	6	4	2	0	26	18	8	5th
(Finland) 1998 Helsinki and Hämeenlinna	7	6	0	1	35	13	13	(gold) Gold
(Canada) 1999 Winnipeg, and five other communities in Manitoba	6	3	3	0	25	20	6	5th
(Sweden) 2000 Skellefteå and Umeå	7	2	4	1	20	19	5	7th
(Russia) 2001 Moscow and Podolsk	7	5	1	1	22	10	11	(silver) Silver
(Czech Republic) 2002 Pardubice and Hradec Králové	7	5	2+	0	23	9	10	(bronze) Bronze
(Canada) 2003 Halifax and Sydney, Nova Scotia	7	4	2	1	22	15	9	(bronze) Bronze
(Finland) 2004 Helsinki and Hämeenlinna	7	5	2	0	26	12	10	(bronze) Bronze
(United States) 2005 Grand Forks and Thief River Falls	6	3*	3	0	14	21	6	5th
(Canada) 2006 Vancouver, Kelowna and Kamloops	7	4*	3	0	24	19	8	(bronze) Bronze
(Sweden) 2007 Mora and Leksand	6	2	4	0	18	23	6	6th
(Czech Republic) 2008 Pardubice and Liberec	6	2†	4	0	19	24	5	6th
(Canada) 2009 Ottawa	6	3	3^	0	20	14	10	7th
(Canada) 2010 Saskatchewan	6	3	3	0	21	22	9	5th
(United States) 2011 Buffalo / Western New York	6	3	3+	0	22	11	12	6th
(Canada) 2012 Calgary and Edmonton	7	5	2+	0	29	22	13	4th
(Russia) 2013 Ufa	6	4†	2	0	34	19	11	7th
(Sweden) 2014 Malmö	7	5*	2^	0	27	17	15	(gold) Gold
(Canada) 2015 Toronto and Montreal	5	1	4^	0	8	14	4	7th
(Finland) 2016 Helsinki	7	6*	1	0	35	22	17	(gold) Gold
(Canada) 2017 Montreal and Toronto	6	3	3	0	12	10	9	9th
(United States) 2018 Buffalo	5	2	3+	0	18	16	7	6th
(Canada) 2019 Vancouver and Victoria	7	5*	2	0	23	11	14	(gold) Gold
(Czech Republic) 2020 Ostrava and Třinec	7	3	4^	22	18	4	10	4th
(Canada) 2021 Edmonton	7	5	2	0	26	15	15	(bronze) Bronze
(Canada) 2022 Edmonton	7	5†	2+	0	31	19	15	(silver) Silver
(Canada) 2023 Halifax and Moncton	5	2	3^	0	14	14	7	5th
(Sweden) 2024 Gothenburg	7	3†*	4	0	25	27	7	4th
(Canada) 2025 Ottawa	7	5†*	2+	0	22	18	14	(silver) Silver
(United States) 2026 Minneapolis–Saint Paul / Minnesota	7	3*	4^+	0	29	24	10	4th
(Canada) 2027 Edmonton / Red Deer	Future event							
(Finland) 2028 Tampere and Turku	Future event							
(Canada) 2029 Quebec City and Trois-Rivières	Future event							

† Includes one win in extra time (in the preliminary round)
^ Includes one loss in extra time (in the preliminary round)
* Includes one win in extra time (in the playoff round)
+ Includes one loss in extra time (in the playoff round)

== Head coaches (WJC) ==
1977-78 Matti Väisänen
1979 Matti Reunamäki
1980-81 Olli Hietanen
1982 Alpo Suhonen
1983 Juhani Wahlsten
1984-85 Pentti Matikainen
1986-88 Hannu Jortikka
1989 Erkka Westerlund
1990 Hannu Jortikka
1991 Samu Kuitunen
1992-93 Jarmo Tolvanen
1994 Esko Nokelainen
1995-96 Harri Rindell
1997 Hannu Jortikka
1998 Hannu Kapanen
1999 Jukka Rautakorpi
2000 Hannu Kapanen
2001 Kari Jalonen
2002-03 Erkka Westerlund

2004 Hannu Aravirta
2005 Risto Dufva
2006 Hannu Aravirta
2007 Jarmo Tolvanen
2008-09 Jukka Rautakorpi
2010 Hannu Jortikka
2011 Lauri Marjamäki
2012 Raimo Helminen
2013 Harri Rindell
2014 Karri Kivi
2015 Hannu Jortikka
2016 Jukka Jalonen
2017 Jukka Rautakorpi/Jussi Ahokas
2018-19 Jussi Ahokas
2020 Raimo Helminen
2021-22 Antti Pennanen
2023 Tomi Lämsä
2024- Lauri Mikkola

== See also ==
- U20 SM-sarja
