= Antti Pennanen =

Finnish ice hockey coach

- Born: February 5, 1979 (age 47) Hausjärvi, Finland
- Height: 6 ft 0 in (183 cm)
- Weight: 207 lb (94 kg; 14 st 11 lb)
- Position: Forward
- Played for: HPK
- Coached for: Jukurit; HPK
- Playing career: 1997–2001
- Coaching career: 2007–present

Antti Pennanen (born 5 February 1979) is a Finnish former ice hockey player and current head coach for Finland men's national ice hockey team, who won the gold medal in the 2026 IIHF World Championship under his guidance. He previously served as the head coach for Ilves, Jukurit and HPK in the Finnish Liiga.

== Playing career ==
Pennanen made his professional debut for HPK during the 1999–2000 season. He then played for Hyvinkään Ahmat during the inaugural Mestis season in 2000–01.

== Coaching career ==
Pennanen served as an assistant coach for HIFK from 2011 to 2013, and an assistant coach for KalPa from 2013 to 2015. He then served as head coach of Jukurit from 2014 to 2016 and won the Mestis championship in 2015 and 2016. He served as the head coach for HPK from 2016 to 2020. He helped lead HPK to the 2019 Kanada-malja as Liiga champions, and was subsequently awarded the Kalevi Numminen trophy.

Pennanen served as an assistant coach for Finland men's national junior ice hockey team that won a gold medal at the 2016 World Junior Ice Hockey Championships. He also served as an assistant coach for Finland men's national ice hockey team that won a gold medal at the 2019 IIHF World Championship. On 12 February 2019, he was named the head coach for Finland men's national junior ice hockey team for the 2021 and 2022 World Junior Ice Hockey Championships. Pennanen was critical of the IIHF following the cancellation of the 2022 World Junior Championship due to the COVID-19 pandemic, stating the tournament was poorly managed.

On 5 October 2022, Pennanen was named head coach of Ilves of the Finnish Liiga, which he coached until spring 2024. Pennanen was named head coach of Finland men's national ice hockey team on 28 September 2023. Pennanen's contract was due to expire in the spring of 2027, but a new contract was agreed with the Finnish Ice Hockey Association, which will cover the spring of 2030.

== Career statistics ==
			Regular season					Playoffs
Season	Team	League	GP	G	A	Pts	PIM	GP	G	A	Pts	PIM
1997–98	HPK	U20 SM	35	4	7	11	26	—	—	—	—	—
1998–99	HPK	U20 SM	19	2	4	6	30	—	—	—	—	—
1999–2000	HPK	U20 SM	22	8	8	16	24	—	—	—	—	—
1999–2000	HPK	SM-l	5	0	0	0	0	—	—	—	—	—
2000–01	Hyvinkään Ahmat	Mestis	32	6	4	10	14	3	0	1	1	2
SM-l totals			5	0	0	0	0	—	—	—	—	—

Preceded by Raimo Helminen	Finland men's national junior ice hockey team coach 2021–2022	Succeeded by Tomi Lämsä
Preceded by Jukka Jalonen	Finnish national ice hockey team coach 2024–	Succeeded by -
