= Kalevi Numminen =

Finnish ice hockey player and coach

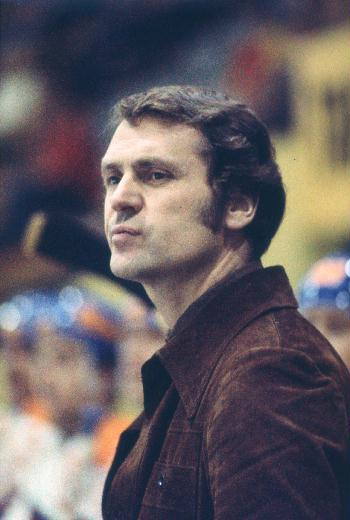
Kalevi Numminen in 1970

Veijo Kalevi Numminen (born 31 January 1940 in Tampere, Finland) is a retired professional ice hockey player who played in the SM-liiga. He played for Tappara. He was inducted into the Finnish Hockey Hall of Fame in 1986, and inducted into the IIHF Hall of Fame in 2011.

Numminen has also coached the national team of Finland in 1973–1974 and then again 1977–1982.

Kalevi's two sons, Teemu Numminen and Teppo Numminen are professional ice hockey players, with Teppo playing over 1,000 career games in the National Hockey League.

Preceded by Len Lunde	Finnish national ice hockey team coach 1973–1974	Succeeded by Seppo Liitsola
Preceded by Seppo Liitsola	Finnish national ice hockey team coach 1977–1982	Succeeded by Alpo Suhonen
