= Hannu Aravirta =

Finnish ice hockey player and coach

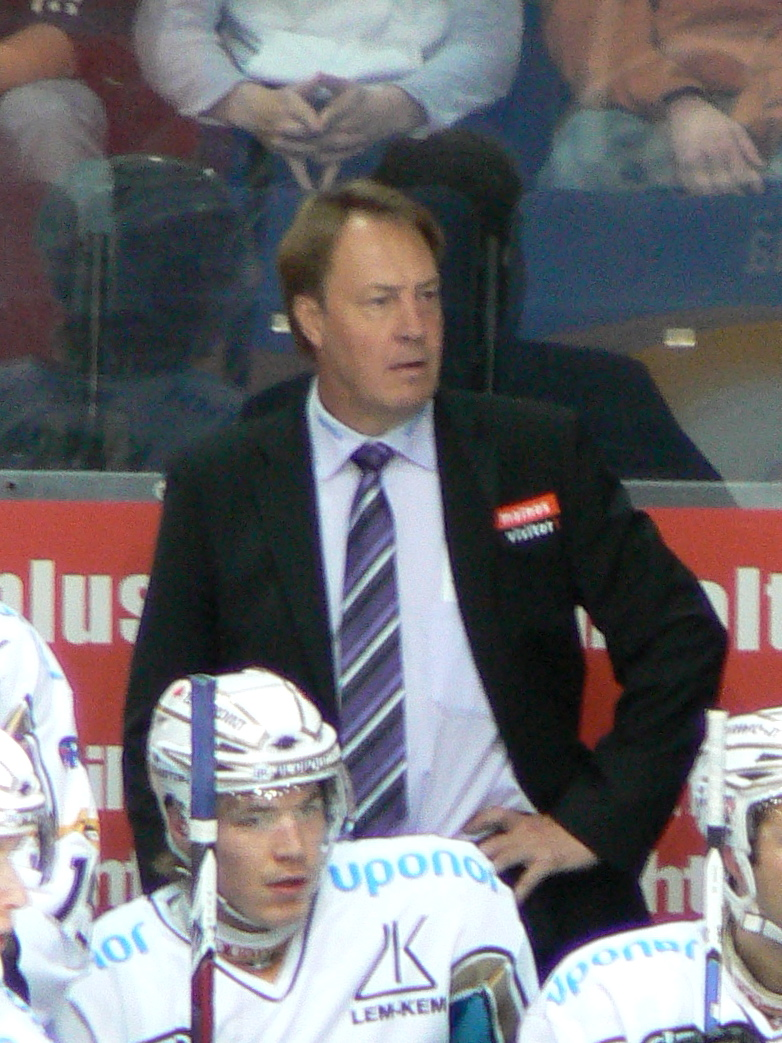
- Hannu Aravirta coaching Pelicans Lahti in September 2008
- Born: 26 March 1953 (age 73) Savonlinna, Finland
- Position: Forward
- Shot: Left
- Played for: SM-liiga; TuTo; Kärpät; 1. Divisioona; SaPKo; HockeyAllsvenskan; Södertälje SK; Kiruna AIF
- Playing career: 1973–1983

Hannu Aravirta (born 26 March 1953) is a Finnish former ice hockey player and ice hockey coach for the Finnish national men's team, SM-liiga and Elitserien.

== Career as player ==
Aravirta was born in Savonlinna, and made his first professional appearance in the 1973–1974 season, playing 35 games for TuTo in the SM-liiga. In the following season Aravirta played for his hometown team SaPKo in the Suomi-sarja for one season (1974–1975). Aravirta then headed to Kärpät for a three-season stint. Kärpät gained promotion from the first division to the SM-liiga after the 1976–1977 season and Aravirta played for the team in the 1977–1978 season. Aravirta left Oulu and Finland as he went to Södertälje SK to play in Swedish Allsvenskan. Aravirta stayed in Södertälje for a total of 3 seasons (1978–1980), and then played in Kiruna AIF for 1980–1981, his last season in Sweden. Aravirta returned to Finland and played for Kärpät for two seasons (1981–1983) before retiring from playing.

== Career as coach ==
Aravirta's first SM-liiga head coaching job was in the 1988–1989 season at JYP. Aravirta was the head coach of JYP for 5 seasons (1989–1993), winning 2 silver medals, 1 bronze and the Coach of the Year trophy (Kalevi Numminen trophy). More success came when in 1993 Aravirta was hired as the new head coach for Jokerit. In his first season at the helm of Jokerit Aravirta won the Finnish Championship. In the following season (1994–1995) he won silver and at his third season (1995–1996) another Finnish Championship.

After the success of 1996 Aravirta left his position in Jokerit to concentrate in his national team assistant coaching job. Aravirta returned to the SM-liiga for the 2003–2004 season when he was hired to coach former Helsinki rivals HIFK. Aravirta's first season was good as HIFK won bronze but his second season however was to be different. Aravirta was fired during the 2005 SM-liiga playoffs after very poor play from HIFK. Aravirta made his third return to SM-liiga in 2006 when he replaced Jami Kauppi as the head coach of Pelicans(whom he has lifted from a team constantly fighting among the bottom teams to a force to be reckoned with. In the 2007–2008 season, Pelicans led the league for the greater part of the year). During his 10-season SM-liiga coaching career Aravirta has won 2 championships, 3 silver medals and 2 bronze medals.

In January 2010, Aravirta signed on for Modo Hockey in the Swedish Elitserien. His contract was not extended after the season, and he signed with Kärpät in November 2010.

== International career ==
In 1992 Aravirta was hired as assistant coach in Finnish national men's ice hockey team Aravirta's first international success came in the 1994 Winter Olympics where Finland was 3rd, winning its second Olympic medal in ice hockey. Finland also placed 2nd in the 1994 Ice Hockey World Championships, losing to Canada in a shootout. In 1995 Finland won its first ever World Championship when the Finnish team defeated hosts of the 1995 Ice Hockey World Championship tournament, Sweden 4–1.

The following World Championships in 1996 and 1997 were disappointments as the Finnish team couldn't qualify for medal games (1997 Ice Hockey World Championships were in Finland). 1998 became a blockbuster season for Finnish ice hockey. First the Finns defeated Canada in the 1998 Winter Olympics to win their third Olympic medal, again a bronze one. 1998 Ice Hockey World Championships featured Finland going against Sweden in the two game finals. Finland lost the first final game 1–0 and the second game was a 0–0 tie. Sweden won the World Championships and Aravirta took his first medal as the head coach of Finland (Curt Lindström retired after 1997 championships). Aravirta had a good start as the head coach of team Finland and more was to come. in 1999 Finland was yet again in the finals but this time the Czech Republic won.

The 2000 tournament was a step backwards; the Finnish team was beaten by Slovakia in the semifinals so Finland was to face Canada in the bronze game. Finland won the tight game 2–1 and got its first bronze medal in the World Championships. The 2001 World Championship tournament was Aravirta's last tournament in medals. Finland fought its way to the Finals and faced off with the Czech Republic. Finland led the game 2–0 but ended up losing 2–3 in overtime. The 2002 Olympic tournament saw the Finnish team lose to Canada in the quarterfinals 2-1 and the 2002 World Championships didn't have a better ending for Finns. Finland lost to Sweden in the Bronze game and the Swedes would avenge their defeat in 1995 (the 2002 tournament was played in Sweden). The 2003 Ice Hockey World Championships marked the last tournament for Hannu Aravirta as the head coach of team Finland. Finland progressed through to the quarterfinals where it yet again faced Sweden. Finland had a comfortable 5–1 Lead after the first period but 2nd and 3rd periods of that game were catastrophic. Sweden won the game 6–5 and dropped Finland from the semifinals. After retiring from national team coaching Aravirta was the head coach of the Finnish Junior Ice Hockey Team.

== Achievements ==
- As National Team Assistant Coach: 1 Gold (1995), 1 Silver (1994) & 1 Olympic Bronze (1994).
- As National Team Head Coach: 3 Silvers (1998, 1999 & 2001), 1 Bronze (2000) & 1 Olympic Bronze (1998)

Preceded by Pentti Matikainen	Winner of the Kalevi Numminen trophy 1988-89	Succeeded by Hannu Jortikka
Preceded by Alpo Suhonen	Jokerit head coach 1993 – 1996	Succeeded by Curt Lundmark
Preceded by Curt Lindström	Finnish national ice hockey team coach 1997 – 2003	Succeeded by Raimo Summanen
