= Len Lunde =

Canadian ice hockey player

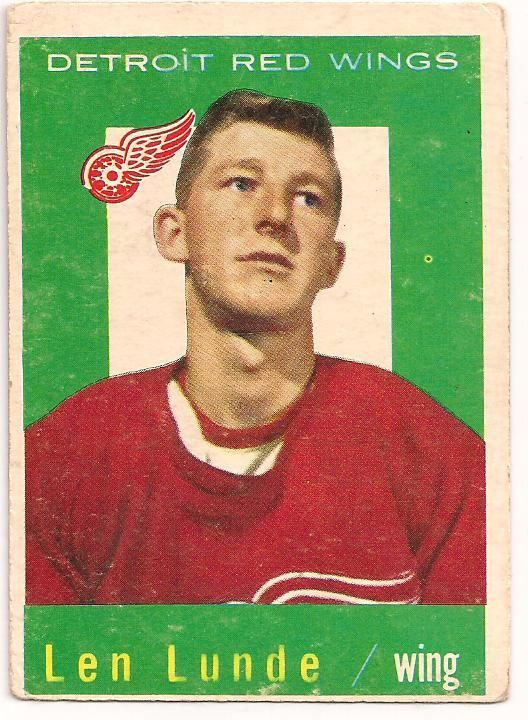
- Born: November 13, 1936; Campbell River, British Columbia, Canada
- Died: November 22, 2010 (aged 74); Edmonton, Alberta, Canada
- Height: 6 ft 1 in (185 cm)
- Weight: 194 lb (88 kg; 13 st 12 lb)
- Position: Centre
- Shot: Right
- Played for: NHL; Detroit Red Wings; Chicago Black Hawks; Minnesota North Stars; Vancouver Canucks; WHA; Edmonton Oilers; SM-sarja; Ilves; Division 1 Mora IK
- Playing career: 1958–1972; 1973–1974; 1979

Leonard Melvin Lunde (November 13, 1936 – November 22, 2010) was a professional ice hockey player who played 321 games in the National Hockey League and 72 games in the World Hockey Association. He played for the Chicago Black Hawks, Minnesota North Stars, Vancouver Canucks, Edmonton Oilers, and Detroit Red Wings.

== Playing career ==
Lunde was born in Campbell River, British Columbia, and played junior hockey with the Edmonton Oil Kings of the WCJHL. A prospect of the Detroit Red Wings, he moved up to the Edmonton Flyers of the Western Hockey League, scoring 39 goals during the 1957–58 season. The following season, he debuted in the National Hockey League, playing in 68 games for the Red Wings, and scoring 14 goals and 12 assists.

He was a regular in the Red Wings' lineup through the 1960–61 season when Detroit reached the Stanley Cup finals, but after spending most of the 1961–62 season in the minors, he was traded to Chicago in June 1962. With the Black Hawks, he notched six goals and 22 assists playing on a checking line with Eric Nesterenko and Ron Murphy.

Beginning in 1963–64, Lunde was chiefly a minor leaguer over the next few seasons. He did play a handful of games for the Hawks, Minnesota North Stars and Vancouver Canucks but saw most of his ice time as an offensive sparkplug in the American Hockey League, the Western Hockey League and the Central Hockey League.

His best year was 1964–65 when he scored 50 goals for the AHL's Buffalo Bisons and was voted on to the league's first all-star team.

His last full season was 1973–74 with the Edmonton Oilers of the World Hockey Association, where he scored 26 goals and added 22 assists for 48 points.

He also played in Finland with Ilves in 1971–1972 and was head coach of the Finnish national team in World Championships 1973 in Moscow. Lunde had initially retired in 1972 before playing for the Edmonton Oilers. Lunde re-retired in 1974 but made a one-game return in 1979 when he played for Mora IK.

Overall, Lunde scored 39 goals and 83 assists and recorded 75 penalty minutes in 321 NHL games. He also scored three goals and two assists in 20 playoff games.

== Post-playing career ==
Lunde was hired as a European scout of the Edmonton Oilers on August 10, 1979.

Lunde died on November 22, 2010, of a heart condition in Edmonton, Alberta.

== Career statistics ==
=== Regular season and playoffs ===
			Regular season					Playoffs
Season	Team	League	GP	G	A	Pts	PIM	GP	G	A	Pts	PIM
1953–54	Edmonton Oil Kings	WJHL	3	0	0	0	0	—	—	—	—	—
1954–55	Edmonton Oil Kings	WJHL	35	28	18	46	37	4	3	2	5	0
1955–56	Edmonton Oil Kings	WJHL	35	37	30	67	27	6	2	2	4	2
1955–56	Edmonton Flyers	WHL	4	0	2	2	2	2	0	1	1	0
1956–57	Edmonton Flyers	WHL	70	20	41	61	22	8	3	5	8	2
1957–58	Edmonton Flyers	WHL	67	39	43	82	17	5	1	4	5	2
1958–59	Detroit Red Wings	NHL	68	14	12	26	15	—	—	—	—	—
1959–60	Detroit Red Wings	NHL	66	6	17	23	10	6	1	2	3	0
1960–61	Detroit Red Wings	NHL	53	6	12	18	10	10	2	0	2	0
1961–62	Detroit Red Wings	NHL	23	2	9	11	4	—	—	—	—	—
1961–62	Edmonton Flyers	WHL	41	26	37	63	21	12	9	9	18	2
1962–63	Chicago Black Hawks	NHL	60	6	22	28	30	4	0	0	0	2
1963–64	Buffalo Bisons	AHL	72	30	43	73	38	—	—	—	—	—
1964–65	Buffalo Bisons	AHL	72	50	46	96	40	9	4	4	8	4
1965–66	Chicago Black Hawks	NHL	24	4	7	11	4	—	—	—	—	—
1965–66	St. Louis Braves	CHL	11	3	5	8	6	—	—	—	—	—
1966–67	Portland Buckaroos	WHL	72	26	33	59	16	4	0	0	0	7
1967–68	Minnesota North Stars	NHL	7	0	1	1	0	—	—	—	—	—
1967–68	Rochester Americans	AHL	37	19	33	52	13	11	2	4	6	0
1968–69	Vancouver Canucks	WHL	65	26	27	53	0	8	3	3	6	0
1969–70	Vancouver Canucks	WHL	68	29	34	63	4	11	10	5	15	8
1970–71	Vancouver Canucks	NHL	20	1	2	3	4	—	—	—	—	—
1971–72	Ilves	FIN	31	28	21	49	40	—	—	—	—	—
1973–74	Edmonton Oilers	WHA	71	26	22	48	8	5	0	1	1	0
1979–80	Mora IK	SWE-2	1	2	0	2	4	—	—	—	—	—
WHL totals			387	166	217	383	82	50	26	27	53	21
WHA totals			71	26	22	48	8	5	0	1	1	0
NHL totals			321	39	83	122	75	20	3	2	5	2

Preceded by Seppo Liitsola	Finnish national ice hockey team coach 1972–1973	Succeeded by Kalevi Numminen
