= Augustin Bubník =

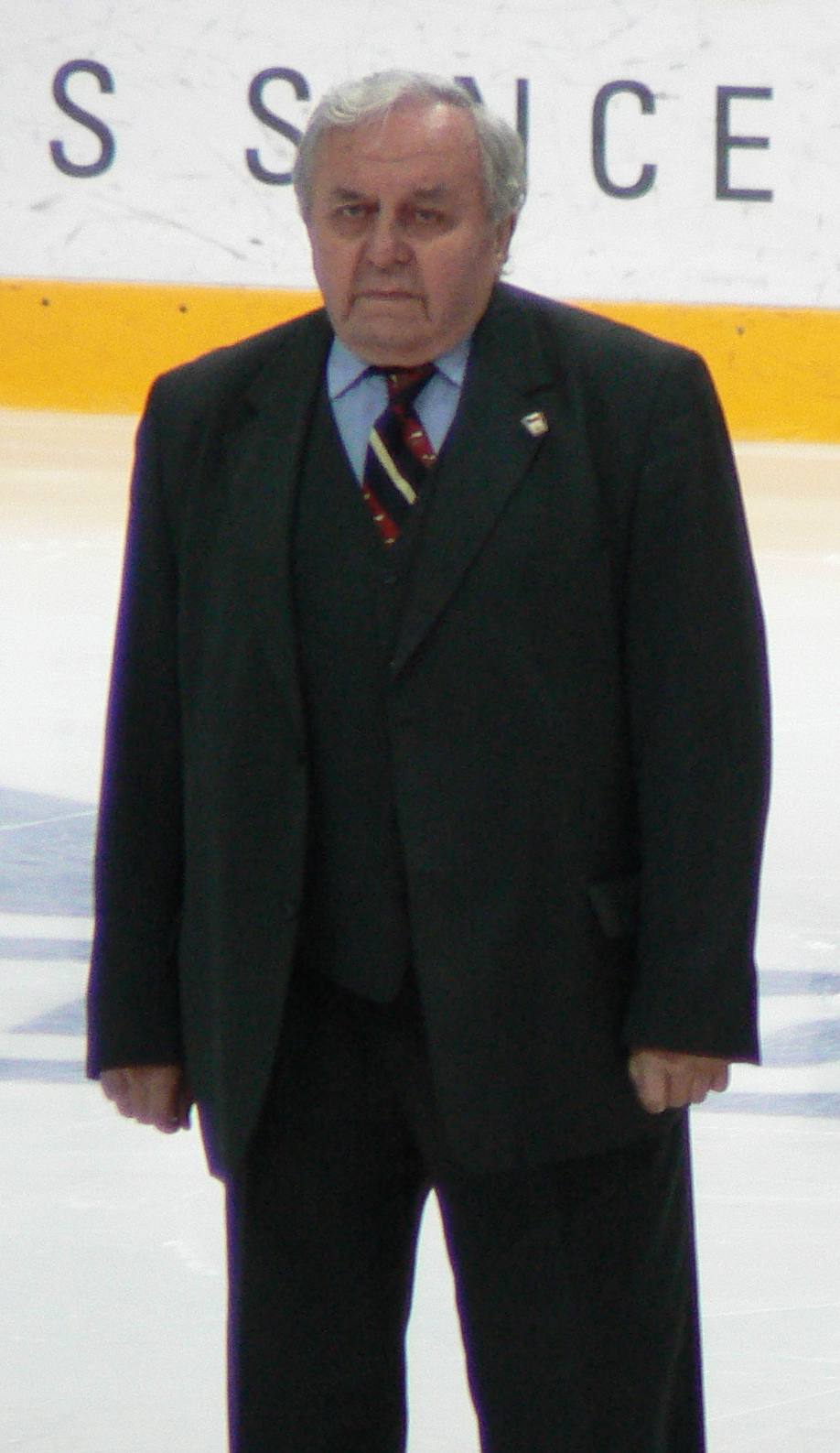
- Born: November 21, 1928 Prague, Czechoslovakia
- Died: April 18, 2017 (aged 88) Prague, Czech Republic
- Position: Centre
- Shot: Left
- National team: Czechoslovakia
- Playing career: 1947–1962
Medal record
Silver medal – second place	1948 Saint-Moritz	Czechoslovakia

Augustin Bubník (21 November 1928 – 18 April 2017) was a Czech ice hockey player for the Czechoslovak national team. He won a silver medal at the 1948 Winter Olympics. He also played in the 1947 and 1949 World Championships, of which Czechoslovakia won both. He later worked as an ice hockey coach and was elected as an MP to the lower chamber of the Czech Parliament from the Civic Democratic Party. He also worked as the ice hockey coach of the Finnish National Team from 1966 to 1969, and was later inducted into the Finnish Hockey Hall of Fame.

== Biography ==
=== Early life ===
Augustin Bubník was born on the 21 November 1928 in Czechoslovakia, now the Czech Republic. He grew up in Prague and played hockey for the LTC Praha Sports club. In 1947, he became a member of the Czechoslovakia national hockey team. The team won silver at the 1948 Winter Olympics in Saint-Moritz, Switzerland. In 1949, the team became World Champions.

=== Life under Communism ===
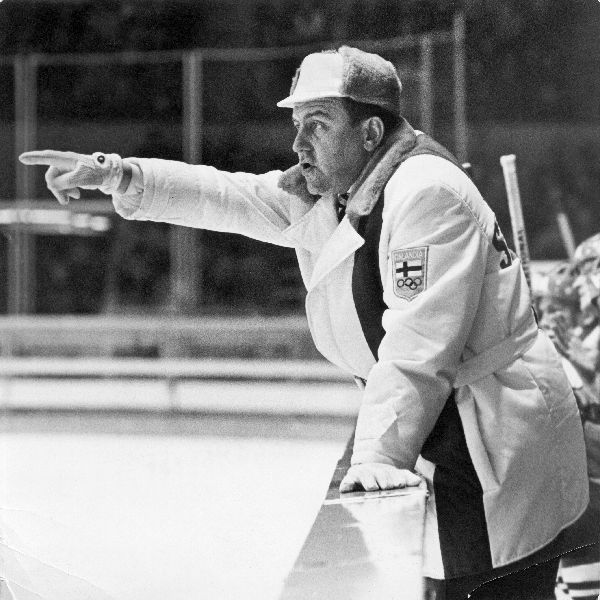
Bubnik as head coach of the Finnish team at the 1968 Winter Olympics.

After the Czechoslovak National Hockey Team won the World Championship in 1949, the following year they were forced to give up their spot in the championship. State Security arrested all of the hockey team members, including Bubník. A trial with fabricated charges was brought against the entire team in 1950. Bubník was convicted of "treason", "subversion of the state" and "espionage". He was then sentenced to fourteen years in prison. He served time in a variety of prisons and in the uranium mines in the Jáchymov district and Bytíz. President Zápotocký granted him amnesty and he was released in January 1955. Afterwards, the Regime only allowed him to play in the minor hockey leagues, so he turned to coaching.

In the mid- to late-1960s, Bubník managed to move to Finland, where he coached the Finnish National Team. He also helped develop hockey in general in Finland as well. In 1968, Bubník was officially rehabilitated, and in 1989, he finally received full social recognition.

=== Later life, death and legacy ===
Bubník served as a Civic Democratic Party member of the Chamber of Deputies from 1998 to 2002.

In 2004, Bubník was inducted into the Finnish Hockey Hall of Fame. In the early 2000s, he was interviewed by the non-profit Post Bellum for their Stories of the 20th Century Project. Bubník died on 18 April 2017, at the age of 88.

Preceded by Joe Wirkkunen	Finnish national ice hockey team coach 1966 – 1969	Succeeded by Seppo Liitsola
