= Rauno Korpi =

Finnish ice hockey coach

- Born: June 25, 1951 (age 75); Tampere, Finland
- Occupation: Ice hockey coach
- Relatives: Kiira Korpi (daughter)
Ice hockey career
- Coached for: Finland's national team (1986-1987); Tappara (1986-1988); TuTo; EC Kac; EV Zug
- National team: Finland

Rauno "Rane" Korpi (born June 25, 1951 in Tampere, Finland) is a Finnish ice hockey coach. He coached Tappara to three consecutive Finnish Championships in SM-liiga during the years 1986-1988. He has also won one additional Finnish Championship Gold, one Silver medal and one Bronze medal. Korpi has been chosen three times as The Coach of the Year in Finland. Other teams coached by Korpi include TuTo, EC KAC, and EV Zug.

Korpi has also coached Finland's national ice hockey team during the years 1986-1987. He has coached Women's national teams and Junior national teams as well.

Korpi is the father of Kiira Korpi, Olympic-level figure skater and winner of European Championships Bronze medal.

Preceded by Alpo Suhonen	Finnish national ice hockey team coach 1986 – 1987	Succeeded by Pentti Matikainen
