= Yrjö Hakala =

Finnish ice hockey player (1932–2023)

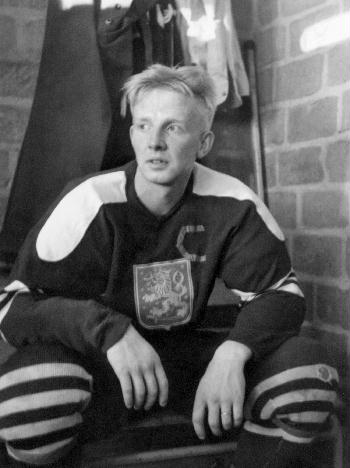
- Born: 20 April 1932 Tampere, Finland
- Died: 15 July 2023 (aged 91)
- Height: 5 ft 10 in (178 cm)
- Weight: 157 lb (71 kg; 11 st 3 lb)
- Position: Right wing
- Shot: Right
- Played for: Ilves; HPK; Tappara; SaiPa
- National team: Finland
- Playing career: 1948–1968

Yrjö Anton Hakala (20 April 1932 – 15 July 2023) was a Finnish ice hockey player who played in the SM-liiga for Tappara and Ilves. He was inducted into the Finnish Hockey Hall of Fame in 1985.

Hawala died on 15 July 2023, at the age of 91.
