= Joe Wirkkunen =

Finnish-Canadian ice hockey coach (1928–1986)

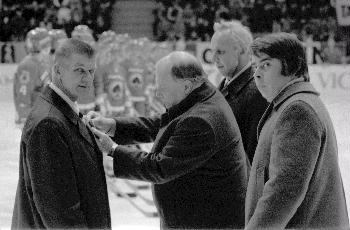
- Wirkkunen (left) receives a medal in 1970
- Born: Viljo Wirkkunen; June 27, 1928; Port Arthur, Ontario, Canada
- Died: July 13, 1986 (aged 58); Thunder Bay, Ontario, Canada
- Occupation(s): Forester, ice hockey coach
- Known for: Finland men's national ice hockey team coach
- Awards: Finnish Hockey Hall of Fame; Northwestern Ontario Sports Hall of Fame

Viljo "Joe" Wirkkunen (June 27, 1928 – July 13, 1986) was a Finnish-Canadian ice hockey coach. Growing up in family of immigrants from Finland to Port Arthur, Ontario, he overcame polio as a child to become an instructor for the Finnish Ice Hockey Association and head coach of the Finland men's national ice hockey team. He led the national team at four Ice Hockey World Championships and two Winter Olympic Games, established a training camp at Vierumäki, and wrote three instructional books for coaches and players. Returning to Canada, he served as the first coach of the Thunder Bay Twins, and contributed to local minor ice hockey. He was among the inaugural class of inductees into the Finnish Hockey Hall of Fame in 1985, and was posthumously inducted into the Northwestern Ontario Sports Hall of Fame in 2008.

== Early life in Canada ==
Viljo Wirkkunen was born on June 27, 1928, in Port Arthur, Ontario, into a Finnish-Canadian family. When infected by polio at age 12, he faced the possibility of losing the ability to walk. He exercised regularly to rebuild his strength, later participating in baseball, curling and golf, and winning walkathons. He was a pitcher in baseball, but never played organized ice hockey since one of his legs was longer than the other.

During the 1940s, Wirkkunen was an ice hockey referee and coach for minor ice hockey games in Port Arthur. In professional life, he worked as a forester for the Hydro-Electric Power Commission of Ontario.

== Hockey career in Finland ==
Wirkkunen's move to Finland resulted from a recommendation by the hockey community in Port Arthur to former Canadian Amateur Hockey Association president Frank Sargent, who forwarded Wirkkunen's name to the Finnish Ice Hockey Association who sought a hockey instructor with knowledge of the Finnish language and the Canadian style of play. In 1951, he began a six-month contract giving lectures and teaching clinics for the Finnish Ice Hockey Association, and helped the Finland men's national team prepare for the 1952 Winter Olympics. During the Olympics, he was an assistant coach to Risto Lindroos.

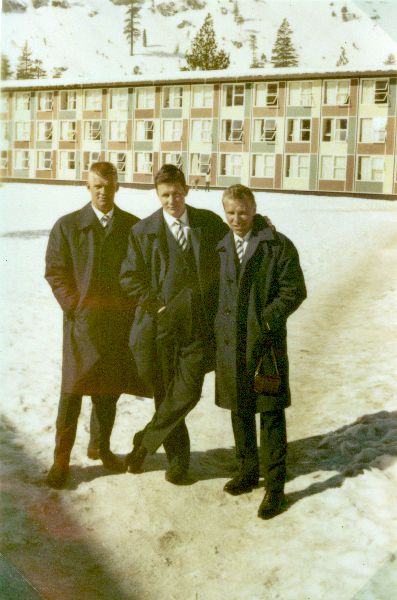
Wirkkunen (left), Teppo Rastio (middle), and Matti Lampainen (right) at the 1960 Winter Olympics

Returning to Finland in 1959, Wirkkunen was the first person born outside of the country to be head coach of the Finland men's national team. He led the team to a seventh-place finish at the 1960 Winter Olympics, but was not given a contract extension. Fellow Canadian Derek Holmes took over for the 1961 World Championships, before Wirkkunen returned for the 1962 World Championships.

Wirkkunen led Finland to three wins and four losses in seven games at the 1962 World Championships. Finland placed fourth overall, and second place among European nations. It was Finland's best result at any World Championships at the time, and earned them the silver medal for the European Championships. At the 1963 World Championships, Finland earned its first victory versus the United States national team, and placed fifth overall with one win and one draw in seven games. At the 1964 Winter Olympics, Wirkkunen led Finland to victories versus the Switzerland national team and the United States, and sixth-place finish.

Finland hosted the World Championships for the first time, with the 1965 event in Tampere. Wirkkunen led Finland to a seventh-place, with a win versus the Norway national team and a draw versus the Sweden national team. His final international tournament as head coach was the 1966 World Championships, where he led Finland to another seventh-place finish with two wins in seven games. Augustin Bubník succeeded Wirkkunen as head coach of the Finland national team in 1966.

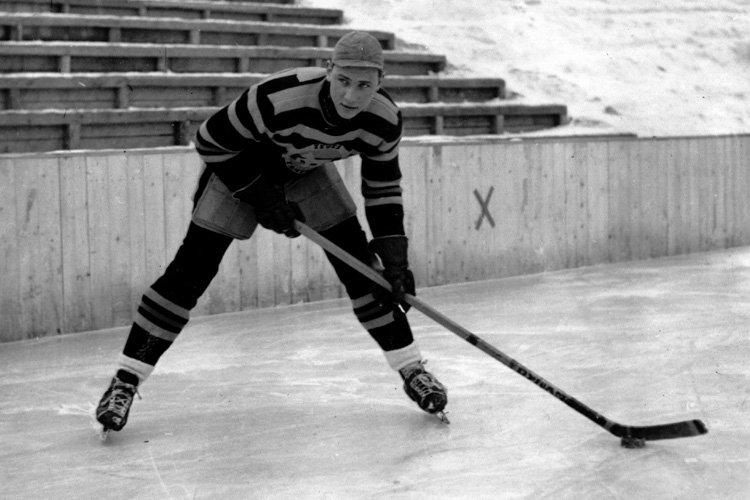
Aarne Honkavaara

Wirkkunen coached the Finland men's national team with assistant Aarne Honkavaara. Together, they established camps in Vierumäki which became an integral part of Finnish training. Wirkkunen also wrote three instructional books for coaches and players, and was invited to travel with the Finland men's national team to competitions during the 1970s. He was remembered for teaching technical and tactical skills, building the foundation for future success of the Finland men's national team, and instilling "a relentless Canadian attitude" into Finnish players.

== Later life and honours ==
Returning to Canada, Wirkkunen served as the first coach of the Thunder Bay Twins. During the 1970–71 United States Hockey League season, he led the team to a record of 19 wins, 20 losses, and 1 draw. He remained involved in local youth leagues, and coached in the Port Arthur Minor Hockey league during the 1980s.

The Finnish Government awarded Wirkkunen the Silver Medal for Merit in Sport in 1978. He was among the inaugural class of inductees into the Finnish Hockey Hall of Fame in 1985.

Wirkkunen died on July 13, 1986, in a home fire accident in Thunder Bay, Ontario. He was posthumously inducted into the Northwestern Ontario Sports Hall of Fame in 2008.
