= Matti Rintakoski =

Finnish ice hockey player (1924–1995)

- Born: 18 September 1924; Tampere, Finland
- Died: 28 June 1995 (aged 70); Tampere, Finland
- National team: Finland
- Playing career: 1940–1959

Matti Erik Rintakoski (18 September 1924 – 28 June 1995) was a Finnish professional ice hockey player who played in the SM-liiga for Hämeenlinnan Tarmo. He was inducted into the Finnish Hockey Hall of Fame in 1985.
