= Seppo Lindström =

Finnish ice hockey player

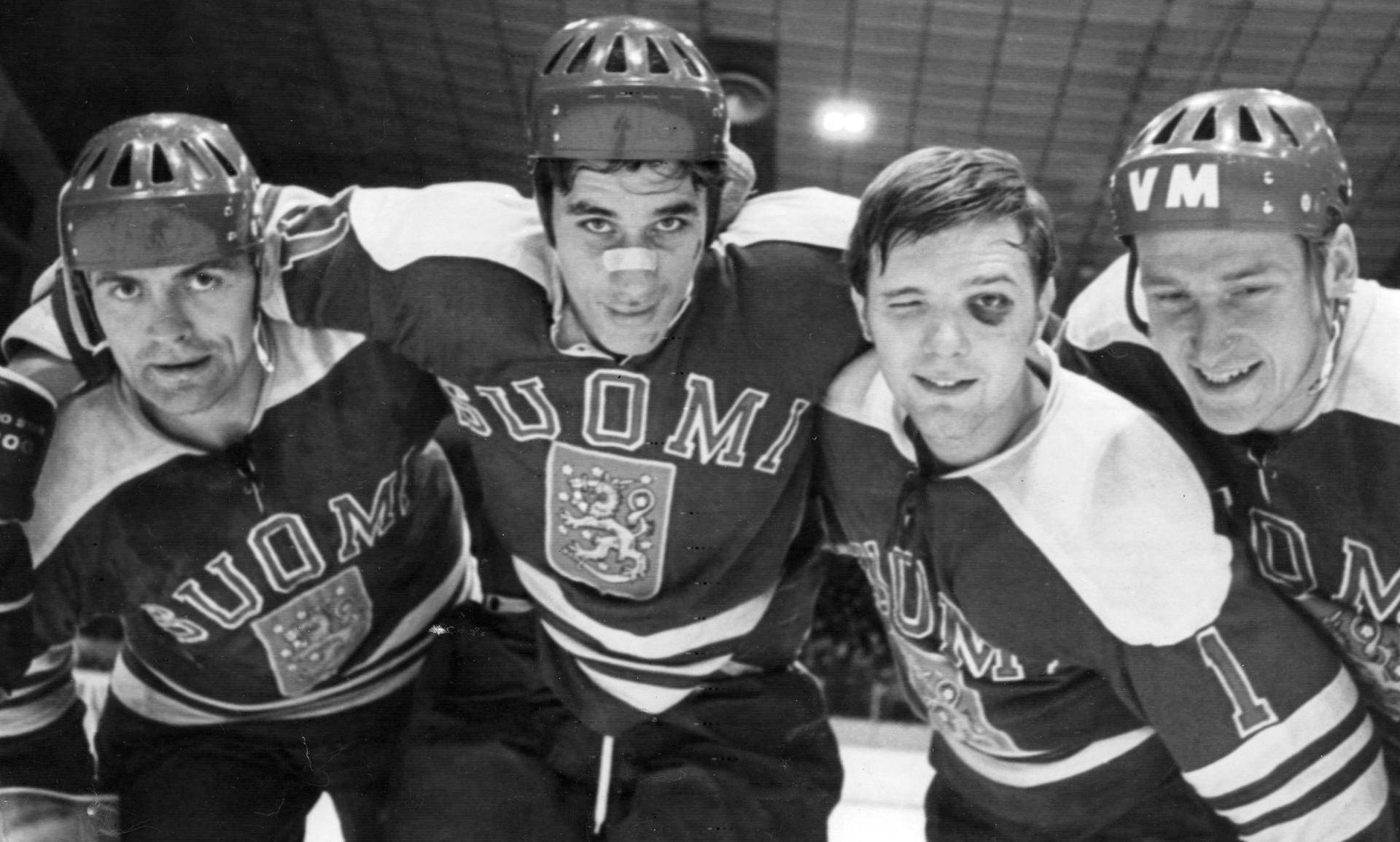
Seppo Lindström (left) in 1969

Seppo Vilhelm Lindström (born May 16, 1941, in Turku, Finland) is a retired professional ice hockey player who played in the SM-liiga. He played in three Olympic games for Finland.

== Career ==
Lindstrom played for TuTo Turku and TPS. He also played a season in Austria for Klagenfurter AC and four seasons in the Bundesliga for Berliner SC.

Linstrom played in the 1968, 1972, and 1976 Winter Olympics. He also played in the 1969, 1971, 1973, 1974, 1975, and 1977 IIHF World Championships.

Lindstom was inducted into the Finnish Hockey Hall of Fame in 1987.

== Sources ==
- Biographical information and career statistics from Eliteprospects.com, or Eurohockey.com
