= Finland men's national ice hockey team =

Finland
- Nickname: Leijonat / Lejonen (The Lions) «Sisu Team»
- Association: Finnish Ice Hockey Association
- General manager: Jere Lehtinen
- Head coach: Antti Pennanen
- Assistants: Mikko Manner; Ville Peltonen; Jussi Tapola
- Captain: Aleksander Barkov
- Most games: Raimo Helminen (331)
- Top scorer: Lasse Oksanen (71)
- Most points: Raimo Helminen (207)
- Team colors
- IIHF code: FIN
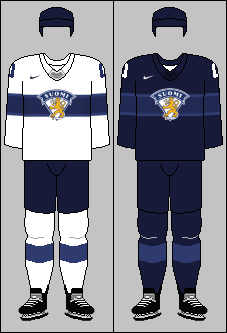

Ranking
- Current IIHF: 4 ▲2 (3 June 2026)
- Highest IIHF: 1 (2022)
- Lowest IIHF: 7 (2005)

First international
- Finland 1–8 Sweden (Helsinki, Finland; 29 January 1928)

Biggest win
- Finland 20–1 Norway (Hämeenlinna, Finland; 12 March 1947)

Biggest defeat
- Canada 24–0 Finland (Oslo, Norway; 3 March 1958)

Olympics
- Appearances: 19 (first in 1952)
- Medals: Gold: (2022); Silver: (1988, 2006); Bronze: (1994, 1998, 2010, 2014, 2026)

IIHF World Championships
- Appearances: 72 (first in 1939)
- Best result: Gold: (1995, 2011, 2019, 2022, 2026)

World Cup / Canada Cup
- Appearances: 7 (first in 1976)
- Best result: 2nd: (2004)

International record (W–L–T)
- 909–885–154

Medal record

Olympic Games
Gold medal – first place	2022 Beijing	Team
Silver medal – second place	1988 Calgary	Team
Silver medal – second place	2006 Turin	Team
Bronze medal – third place	1994 Lillehammer	Team
Bronze medal – third place	1998 Nagano	Team
Bronze medal – third place	2010 Vancouver	Team
Bronze medal – third place	2014 Sochi	Team
Bronze medal – third place	2026 Milan Cortina	Team

World Championship
Gold medal – first place	1995 Sweden	
Gold medal – first place	2011 Slovakia	
Gold medal – first place	2019 Slovakia	
Gold medal – first place	2022 Finland	
Gold medal – first place	2026 Switzerland	
Silver medal – second place	1992 Czechoslovakia	
Silver medal – second place	1994 Italy	
Silver medal – second place	1998 Switzerland	
Silver medal – second place	1999 Norway	
Silver medal – second place	2001 Germany	
Silver medal – second place	2007 Russia	
Silver medal – second place	2014 Belarus	
Silver medal – second place	2016 Russia	
Silver medal – second place	2021 Latvia	
Bronze medal – third place	2000 Russia	
Bronze medal – third place	2006 Latvia	
Bronze medal – third place	2008 Canada	

The Finnish men's national ice hockey team, nicknamed Leijonat / Lejonen ("The Lions" in Finnish and Swedish), is governed by the Finnish Ice Hockey Association. Finland is one of the most successful national ice hockey teams in the world and a member of the so-called "Big Six", the unofficial group of the six strongest men's ice hockey nations, along with Canada, the United States, Czechia, Russia, and Sweden. They are the 2026 IIHF World Champions.

Finland won the world championship in 2026, their fifth title after 1995, 2011, 2019 and 2022. A duo of silver medals (1988, 2006) remained the country's best Olympic result until 2022 when the Finns won their first Olympic gold after defeating Russia. At the Canada/World Cup, their best achievement is a silver medal which they won in 2004.

== History ==
Finland's first appearance in an elite ice hockey competition was at the 1939 Ice Hockey World Championships in Switzerland. The result was a shared last place with Yugoslavia. Ten years later, Finland came to the 1949 Ice Hockey World Championships in Sweden. The Finns finished in 7th place by winning the consolation round. Finland's first appearance at the Winter Olympics occurred in 1952 in Oslo.

In the 1974 Men's World Ice Hockey Championships two players were suspended for doping. They were the Swede Ulf Nilsson and the Finn Stig Wetzell who failed a drug test for the forbidden substance ephedrine. Both players were suspended for the rest of the tournament. Nilsson failed the test after Sweden's game against Poland, which Sweden won 4–1. The game was awarded to Poland as a 5–0 forfeit. The Finn, Wetzell, failed the test after Finland's match against Czechoslovakia, which Finland won 5–2, meaning the game was awarded to Czechoslovakia as a 5–0 forfeit. The Finns were able to defeat Czechoslovakia again on the last day, which would have earned their first medal in history, if not for the points lost in the forfeited win.

Finnish National Team played one regular season game in the World Hockey Association (WHA) against the Edmonton Oilers in 1978–79 season.

Finland was close again to winning the first medal in its history at the 1986 Men's World Ice Hockey Championships, when it led 4–2 in the final minute of the medal round match against Sweden. However, in the last minute of the match Anders "Masken" Carlsson first narrowed Finland's lead to one goal and then leveled the score with the help of the Finns' mistake. The match eventually ended in a 4–4 draw, meaning Finland's ranking in the tournament was fourth place.

At the 1992 Men's Ice Hockey World Championships, Finland's success and silver medal came as a surprise to many Finns, as the team was not expected to much because of inexperience and the lack of success at the 1992 Albertville Winter Olympics in the same year. The medal achieved in the tournament was the first World Championship medal and the second value medal after the 1988 Calgary Winter Olympics, where Finland clinched a surprise silver after defeating the unmotivated USSR.

At the 1995 Men's World Ice Hockey Championships, Finland achieved its first gold in international ice hockey. The Finns reached the final with a 5–0 victory over France in the quarter-finals, and a 3–0 victory over the Czech Republic in the semi-finals. In the final, Finland faced off against their hockey rivals and host of the 1995 tournament, Sweden. In the first period of the final, left wing Ville Peltonen scored a natural hat-trick, and then assisted Timo Jutila's first period goal to give Finland a 4–0 lead, on the way to an eventual 4–1 victory.

At the 1998 Olympic men's ice hockey tournament, Team Finland came away with bronze, after defeating the Canadian national team 3–2. Teemu Selänne led the tournament in goals scored (4) and total points achieved (10). The tournament was the first in which players from the National Hockey League (NHL) were released to participate, allowing national teams to be constructed using the best possible talent from each country. The 1998 Olympic tournament therefore came to be known as the Tournament of the Century.

At the 2006 Winter Olympics, Finland won a silver medal, coming close to winning in the final but losing 3–2 to Sweden. Finland's goaltender Antero Niittymäki was named the MVP of the tournament (with only eight goals conceded throughout the whole tournament) and Teemu Selänne was voted best forward. The format was changed from the 1998 and 2002 tournaments, to a format similar to the 1992 and 1994 tournaments. The number of teams was reduced from 14 to 12. The 12 teams were split into two groups in the preliminary stage, which followed a round robin format. Each team played the other teams in their group once. The top four teams from each group advanced to the quarter-finals.

At the 2006 IIHF World Championship, Finland achieved third place after winning the bronze medal game against Canada. Petteri Nummelin was named to the Media All-Star Team.

At the 2007 IIHF World Championship, Finland lost the final to the Canadian team. The final marked the second time that Finland and Canada met in the gold medal game of a World Championship, the first time being in 1994. Only a year before, in 2006 Finland had defeated Canada 5–0 in the bronze medal game. In 2007, Canada were looking on form, being undefeated coming into the playoff round, while Finland had registered two losses in the run-up to the finals. Rick Nash scored on the powerplay at 6:10 into the first period on a one-timer from the point from a pass by Cory Murphy off of Matthew Lombardi, to put Canada up 1–0. Near the middle of the period, Eric Staal scored in similar fashion also on the powerplay, assisted by Justin Williams, and Mike Cammalleri. 9:11 into the second period, Colby Armstrong scored to give the Canadians a 3–0 lead. This goal ended up as the game winner. Finland had some discipline difficulty in the first two periods, taking 6 minutes apiece in penalties in both periods. The Finns started to bring up the pressure in the last ten minutes, and Petri Kontiola scored a nice glove-side goal on Ward at 51:08 assisted by Ville Peltonen, to put the team on the board. With only 3 minutes left Antti Miettinen scored to bring Finland within one, 3–2. However, just one minute later Rick Nash scored on a skillful breakaway to put the game away, with Canada winning 4–2 and clinching the title. The Canadians were outshot 22–18, but their goaltender, Cam Ward, kept Canada in the game as he was solid between the pipes. They also were able to capitalize on the powerplay, which ended up being decisive in the Canadian win. Kari Lehtonen was voted Tournament's best goaltender.

At the 2008 IIHF World Championship, Finland achieved third place after winning the bronze medal game 4–0 against rivals Sweden.

At the 2010 Winter Olympics, Finland again came away with the bronze, winning 5–3 against Slovakia. During the tournament, Teemu Selänne became the all-time leader for points scored in the Olympics. He notched an assist in his second game of the tournament for 37 career points, surpassing Valeri Kharlamov of the Soviet Union, Vlastimil Bubník of Czechoslovakia, and Harry Watson of Canada.

At the 2011 IIHF World Championship, Finland won its second world title, beating the Swedish national team by a score of 6–1 in the final. As two highly ranked neighboring countries, Sweden and Finland have a long-running competitive tradition in ice hockey. Before the game, mainstream media in both countries titled the match "a dream final". After a goalless first period, Sweden opened the game with a 1–0 goal by Magnus Pääjärvi in the second period at 27:40. Seven seconds before the period's end, Finland's Jarkko Immonen scored to tie the game 1–1. Finland took the lead early in the third period, scoring two goals at 42:35 and 43:21 by Nokelainen and Kapanen. Sweden then took a time-out with ten minutes left to play but did not manage to regroup, and Finland scored a further three goals courtesy of Janne Pesonen, Mika Pyörälä and Antti Pihlström to clinch the title. Team Finland's Jarkko Immonen led the tournament in both goals and points scored, with 9 and 12 respectively.

The Finns won their third world title at the 2019 IIHF World Championship in Slovakia, and after the cancelled tournament of 2020, they reached the final in the 2021 tournament, losing to Canada in overtime.

At the 2022 Winter Olympics, Finland won the gold medal for the first time, going undefeated and beating Russia in the final. This allowed them to rise to first place in the IIHF World Ranking for the first time ever. In May 2022, Finland won their fourth World Championship, beating Canada in overtime after a hard-fought game. This was the third Canada–Finland final in a row, and the first time the Finns won a medal on home ice. Finland became the second team to win Olympic gold and World Championship gold in the same year, following Sweden in 2006.

Finland won its fifth world championship in 2026 in a 1–0 overtime victory over Switzerland in Zurich.

== Tournament record ==
=== Olympic Games ===
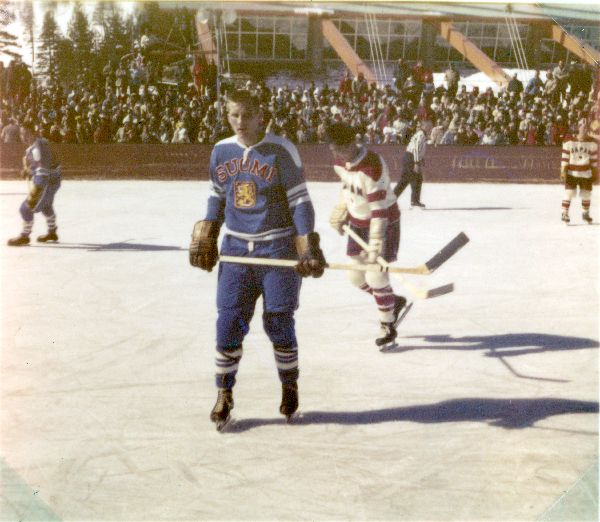
Heino Pulli at the 1960 Winter Olympics, Squaw Valley

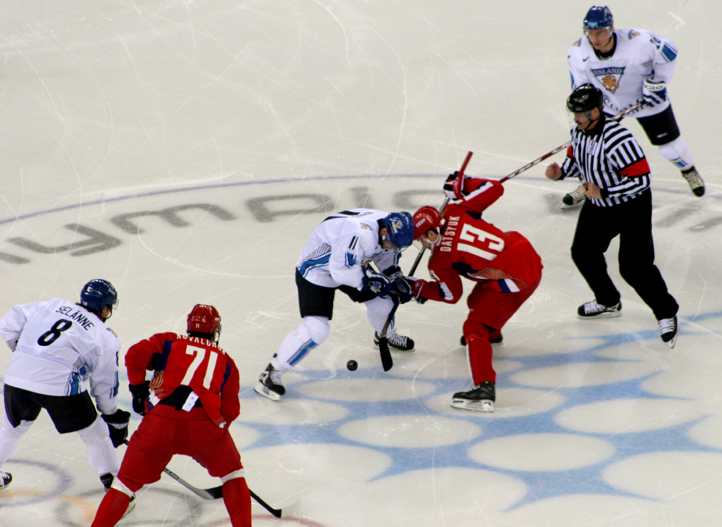
Finland in the 2006 Winter Olympics semi-final match against Russia

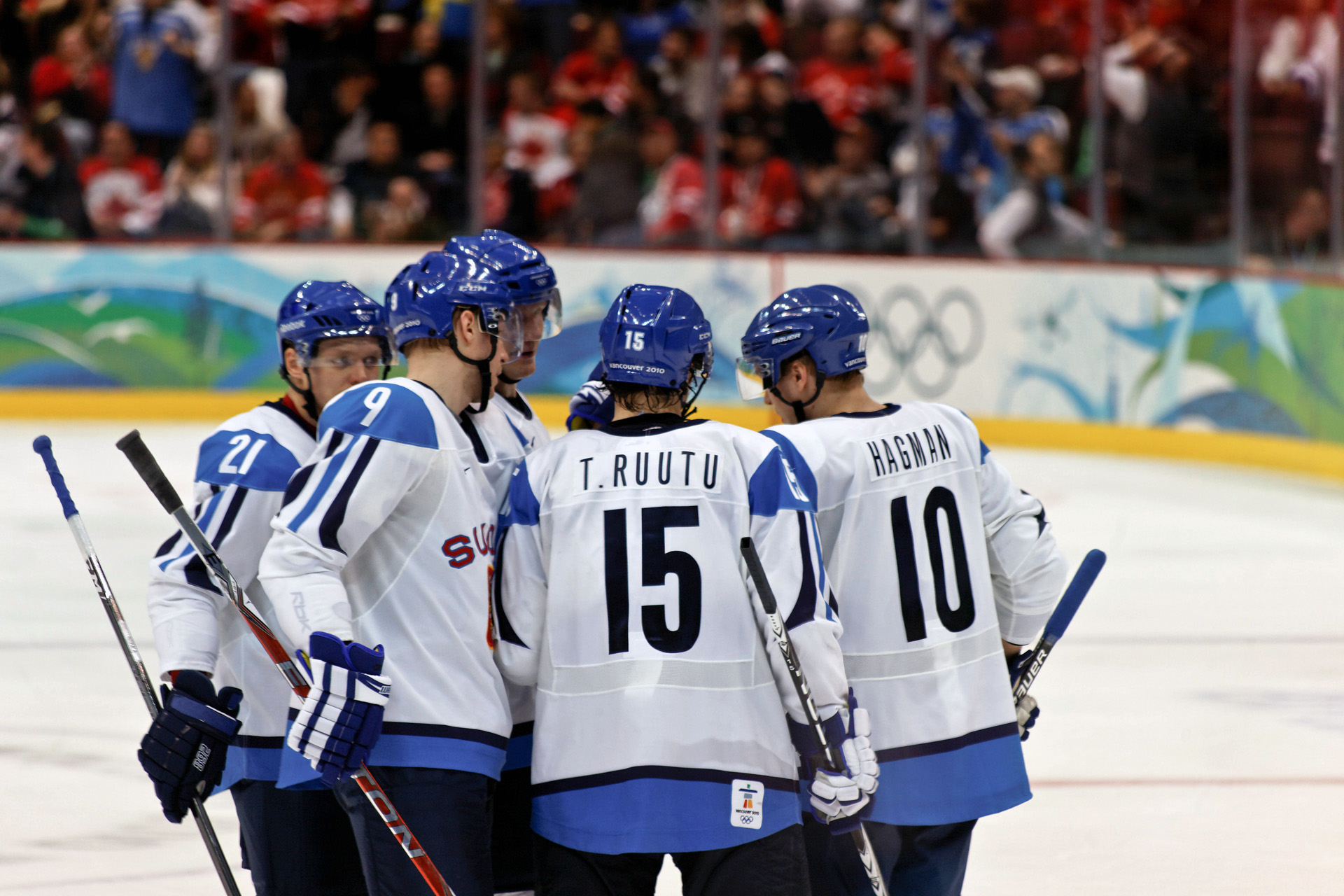
Janne Niskala, Mikko Koivu, Joni Pitkänen, Tuomo Ruutu and Niklas Hagman at the 2010 Winter Olympics, Vancouver

Games	GP	W	L	T	GF	GA	Coach	Captain	Round	Finish
(Belgium) 1920 Antwerp	Did not participate									
(France) 1924 Chamonix	Did not participate									
(Switzerland) 1928 St. Moritz	Did not participate									
(United States) 1932 Lake Placid	Did not participate									
(Germany) 1936 Garmisch-Partenkirchen	Did not participate									
(Switzerland) 1948 St. Moritz	Did not participate									
(Norway) 1952 Oslo	8	2	6	0	21	60	Risto Lindroos	Aarne Honkavaara	Round-robin	7th
(Italy) 1956 Cortina d'Ampezzo	Did not participate									
(United States) 1960 Squaw Valley	6	3	2	1	55	23	(Canada) Joe Wirkkunen	Yrjö Hakala	Consolation Round	7th
(Austria) 1964 Innsbruck	8	3	5	0	18	33	(Canada) Joe Wirkkunen	Raimo Kilpiö	Round-robin	6th
(France) 1968 Grenoble	8	4	3	1	28	25	(Czechoslovakia) Gustav Bubník	Matti Reunamäki	Round-robin	5th
(Japan) 1972 Sapporo	6	3	3	0	27	25	Seppo Liitsola	Lasse Oksanen	Final Round	5th
(Austria) 1976 Innsbruck	6	3	3	0	30	20	Seppo Liitsola	Seppo Lindström	Final Round	4th
(United States) 1980 Lake Placid	7	3	3	1	31	25	Kalevi Numminen	Tapio Levo	Final Round	4th
(Socialist Federal Republic of Yugoslavia) 1984 Sarajevo	6	2	3	1	31	26	Alpo Suhonen	Anssi Melametsä	Consolation Round	6th
(Canada) 1988 Calgary	8	5	2	1	34	14	Pentti Matikainen	Timo Blomqvist	Final Round	Silver
(France) 1992 Albertville	8	4	3	1	29	11	Pentti Matikainen	Pekka Tuomisto	7th place game	7th
(Norway) 1994 Lillehammer	8	7	1	0	38	10	(Sweden) Curt Lindström	Timo Jutila	3rd place game	Bronze
(Japan) 1998 Nagano	6	3	3	0	20	19	Hannu Aravirta	Saku Koivu	3rd place game	Bronze
(United States) 2002 Salt Lake City	4	2	2	0	12	10	Hannu Aravirta	Teemu Selänne	Quarter-finals	6th
(Italy) 2006 Turin	8	7	1	0	29	8	Erkka Westerlund	Saku Koivu	Final	Silver
(Canada) 2010 Vancouver	6	4	2	–	19	13	Jukka Jalonen	Saku Koivu	3rd place game	Bronze
(Russia) 2014 Sochi	6	4	2	–	24	10	Erkka Westerlund	Teemu Selänne	3rd place game	Bronze
(South Korea) 2018 Pyeongchang	5	3	2	–	16	9	Lauri Marjamäki	Lasse Kukkonen	Quarter-finals	6th
(China) 2022 Beijing	6	6	0	–	22	8	Jukka Jalonen	Valtteri Filppula	Final	Gold
(Italy) 2026 Milan / Cortina d'Ampezzo	6	4	2	–	27	11	Antti Pennanen	Mikael Granlund	3rd place game	Bronze
(France) 2030 French Alps	Future event									

Medals
Participations	Gold	Silver	Bronze	Total
19	1	2	5	8

=== World Championship ===
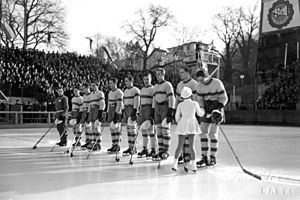
The Finnish team that marked the country's debut at the World Championships in 1939

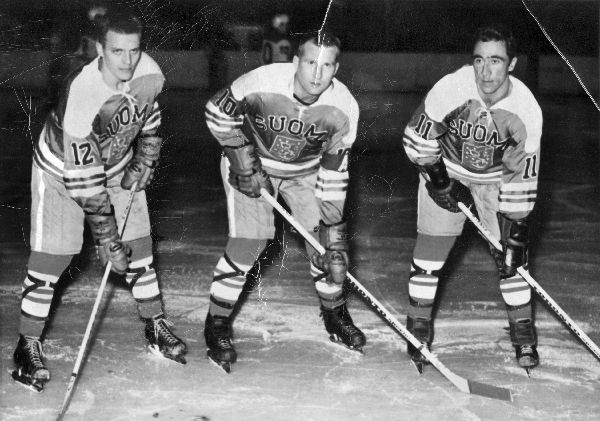
Matti Reunamäki, Heino Pulli and Seppo Nikkilä in 1960s

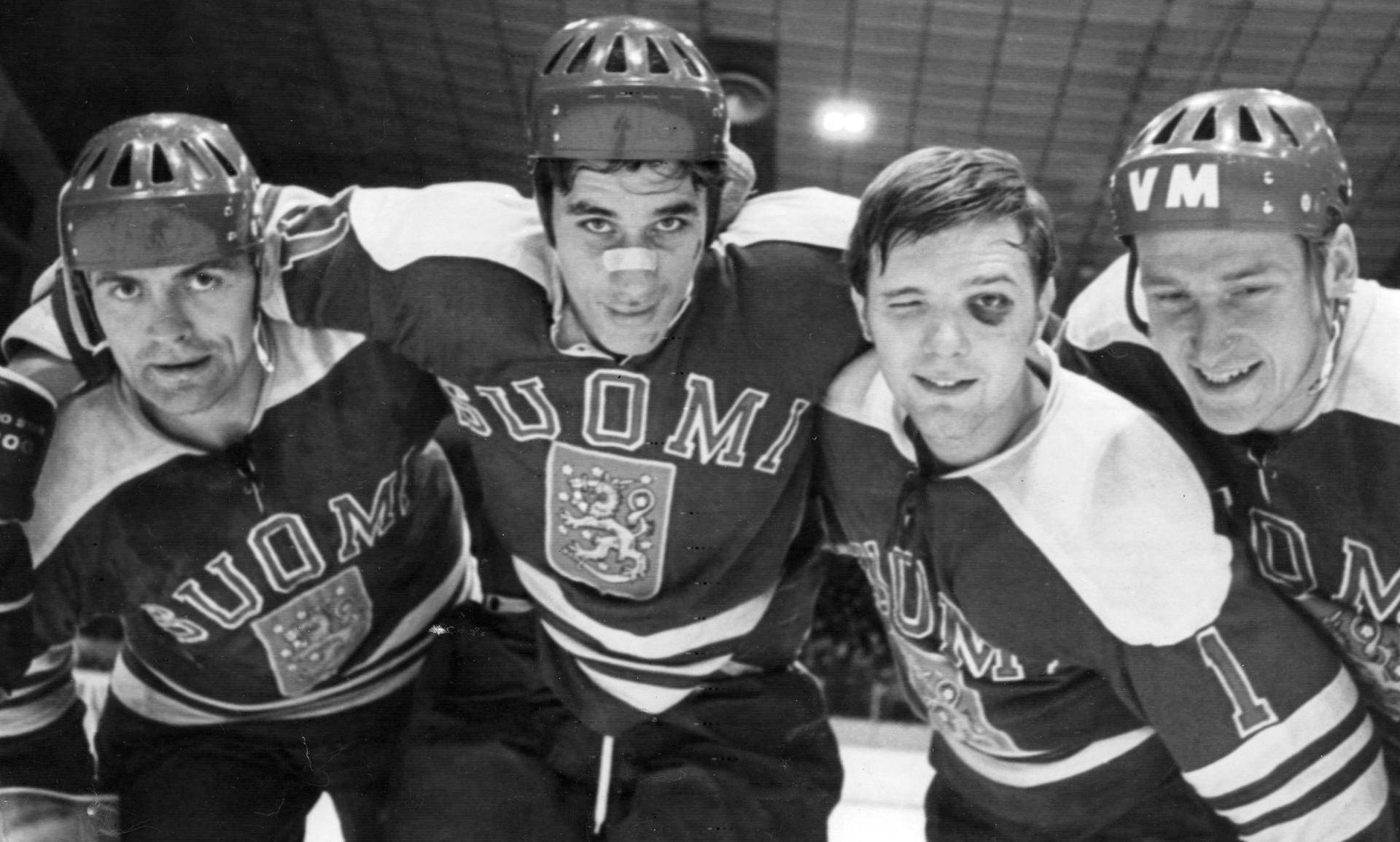
Seppo Lindström, Veli-Pekka Ketola, Jorma Valtonen and Lasse Oksanen at the 1969 World Championships

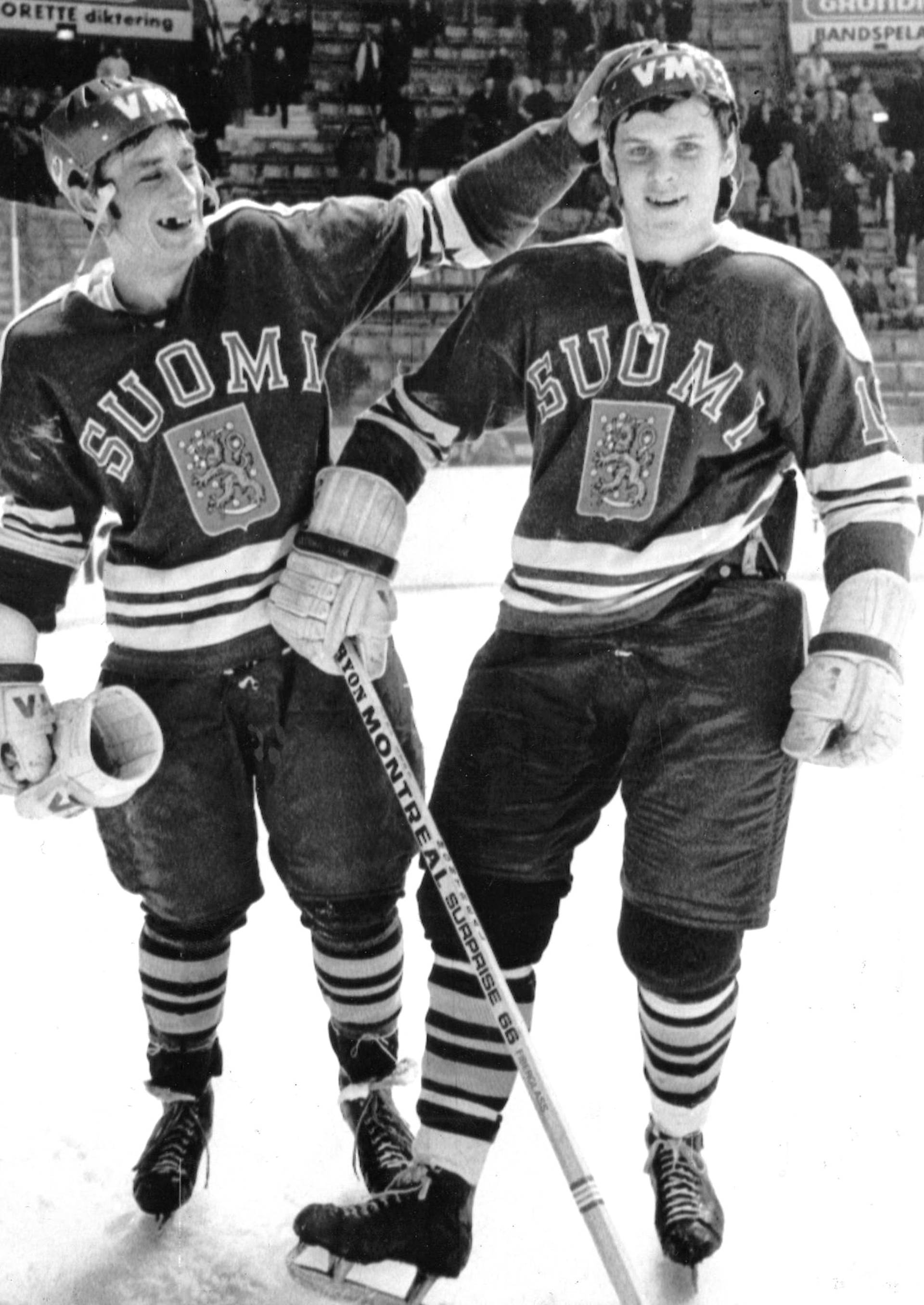
Matti Keinonen and Matti Murto at the 1970 World Championships

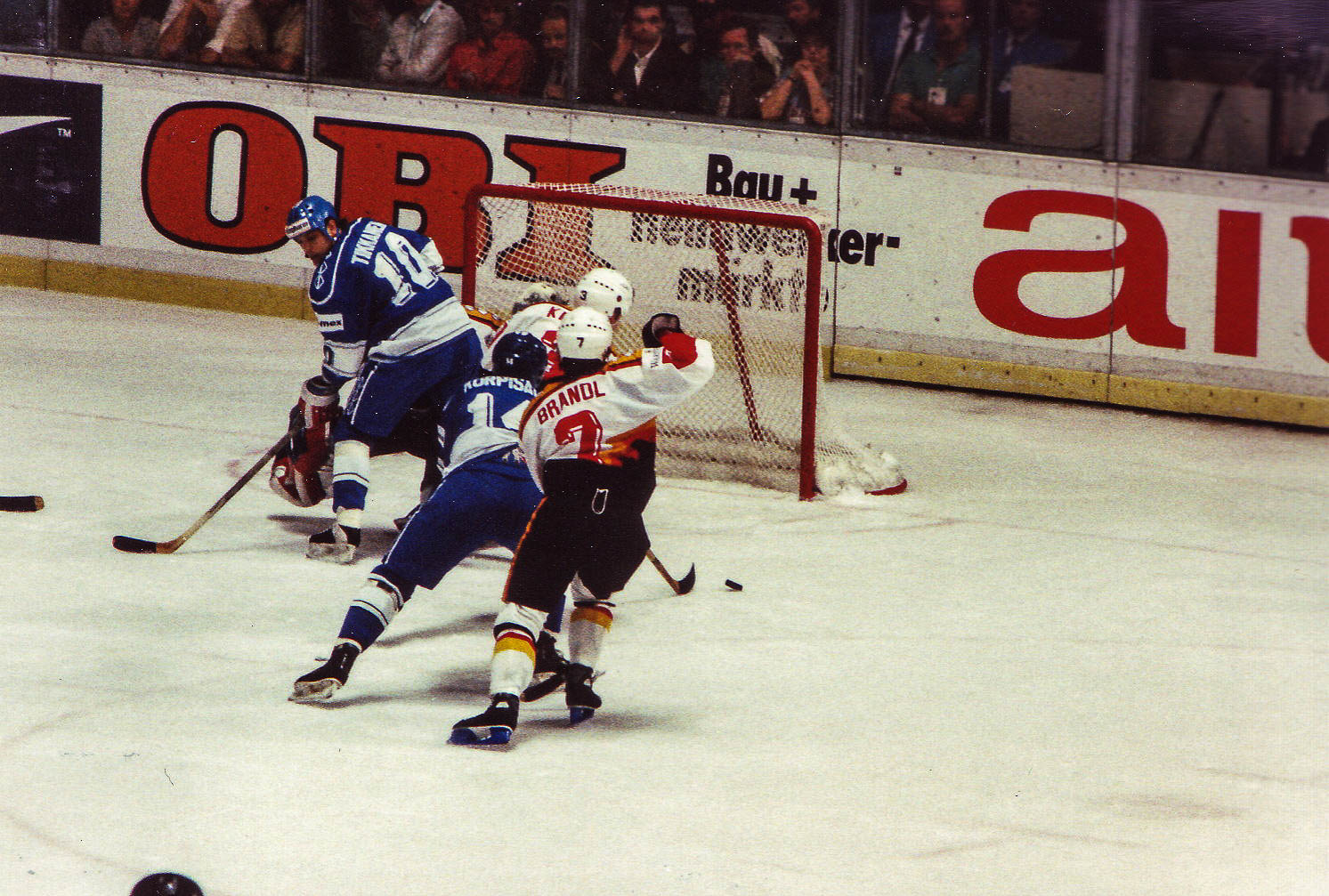
Germany and Finland at the 1993 World Championships

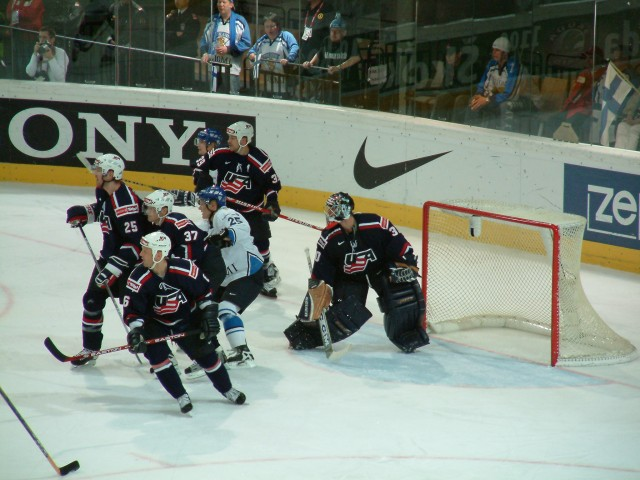
The United States and Finland go head-to-head at the 2005 IIHF World Championship

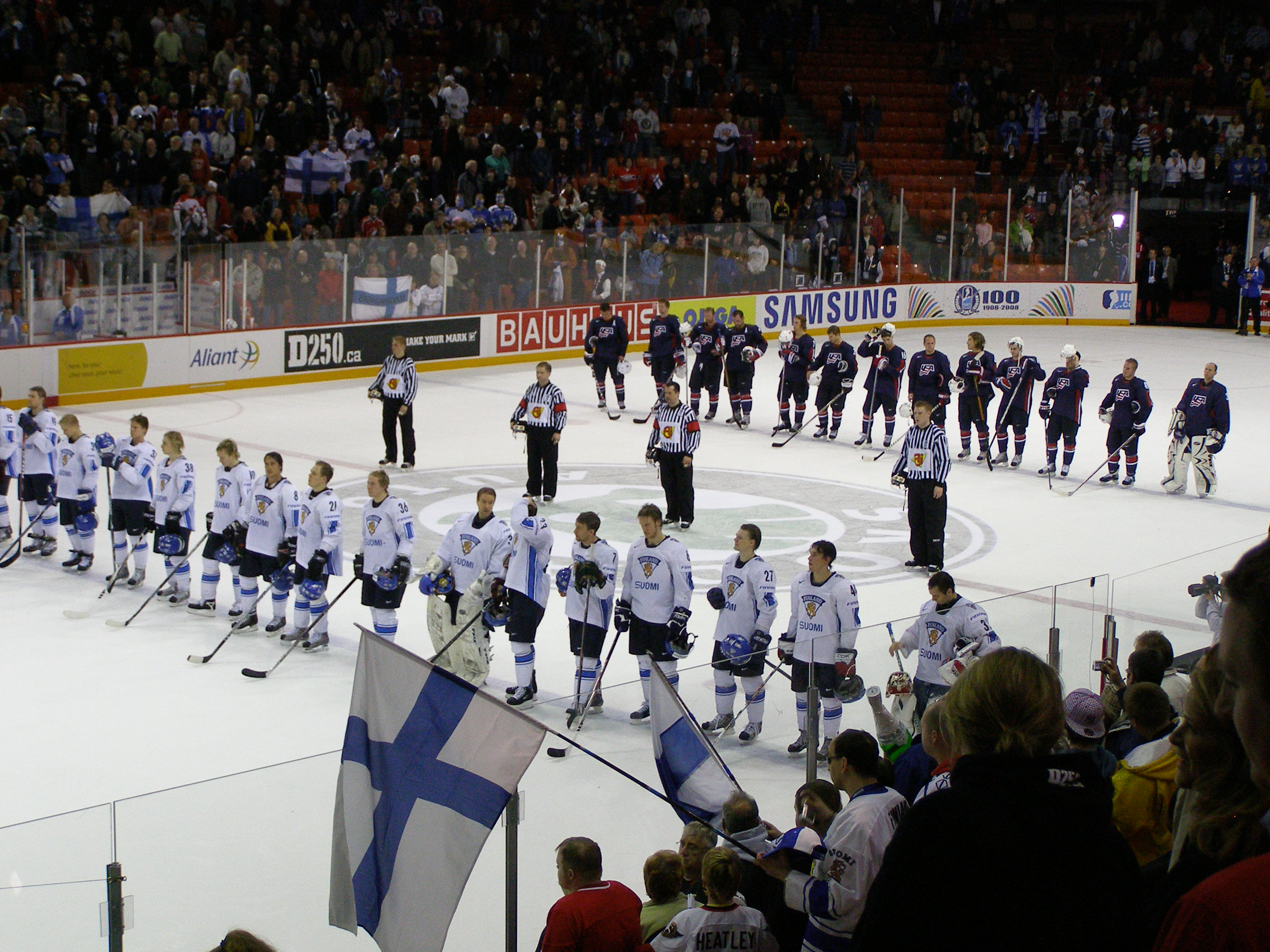
Finland and the United States at the 2008 IIHF World Championship

Year	Location	Coach	Captain	Finish	Result
1939	Zürich / Basel, Switzerland	Risto Tiitola	Erkki Saarinen	Consolation Round	13th place
1949	Stockholm, Sweden	Risto Lindroos	Keijo Kuusela	Consolation Round	7th place
1951	Paris, France	Risto Lindroos	Keijo Kuusela	Group stage	7th place
1954	Stockholm, Sweden	Risto Lindroos	Matti Rintakoski	Group stage	6th place
1955	Krefeld / Dortmund / Cologne, West Germany	Aarne Honkavaara	Matti Rintakoski	Group stage	9th place
1957	Moscow, Soviet Union	Aarne Honkavaara	Yrjö Hakala	Group stage	4th place
1958	Oslo, Norway	Aarne Honkavaara	Yrjö Hakala	Group stage	6th place
1959	Prague / Bratislava, Czechoslovakia	(Canada) Joe Wirkkunen	Yrjö Hakala	Final Round	6th place
1961	Geneva / Lausanne, Switzerland	(Canada) Derek Holmes	Erkki Koiso	Group stage	7th place
1962	Colorado Springs / Denver, United States	(Canada) Joe Wirkkunen	Teppo Rastio	Group stage	4th place
1963	Stockholm, Sweden	(Canada) Joe Wirkkunen	Esko Luostarinen	Group stage	5th place
1965	Tampere, Finland	(Canada) Joe Wirkkunen	Raimo Kilpiö	Group stage	7th place
1966	Ljubljana, Yugoslavia	(Czechoslovakia) Augustin Bubník	Lalli Partinen	Group stage	7th place
1967	Vienna, Austria	(Czechoslovakia) Augustin Bubník	Matti Reunamäki	Group stage	6th place
1969	Stockholm, Sweden	(Czechoslovakia) Augustin Bubník	Juhani Wahlsten	Group stage	5th place
1970	Stockholm, Sweden	Seppo Liitsola	Lasse Oksanen	Group stage	4th place
1971	Bern / Geneva, Switzerland	Seppo Liitsola	Lasse Oksanen	Group stage	4th place
1972	Prague, Czechoslovakia	Seppo Liitsola	Lasse Oksanen	Group stage	4th place
1973	Moscow, Soviet Union	(Canada) Len Lunde	Veli-Pekka Ketola	Group stage	4th place
1974	Helsinki, Finland	Kalevi Numminen	Veli-Pekka Ketola	Group stage	4th place
1975	Munich / Düsseldorf, West Germany	Seppo Liitsola	Seppo Lindström	Group stage	4th place
1976	Katowice, Poland	Seppo Liitsola	Lasse Oksanen	Consolation Round	5th place
1977	Vienna, Austria	Lasse Heikkilä	Pertti Koivulahti	Consolation Round	5th place
1978	Prague, Czechoslovakia	Kalevi Numminen	Seppo Repo	Consolation Round	7th place
1979	Moscow, Soviet Union	Kalevi Numminen	Juhani Tamminen	Consolation Round	5th place
1981	Gothenburg / Stockholm, Sweden	Kalevi Numminen	Juhani Tamminen	Consolation Round	6th place
1982	Helsinki / Tampere, Finland	Alpo Suhonen	Juhani Tamminen	First Round	5th place
1983	Düsseldorf / Dortmund / Munich, West Germany	Alpo Suhonen	Pekka Rautakallio	Consolation Round	7th place
1985	Prague, Czechoslovakia	Alpo Suhonen	Anssi Melametsä	Consolation Round	5th place
1986	Moscow, Soviet Union	Rauno Korpi	Kari Makkonen	Final Round	4th place
1987	Vienna, Austria	Rauno Korpi	Pekka Järvelä	Consolation Round	5th place
1989	Stockholm / Södertälje, Sweden	Pentti Matikainen	Timo Blomqvist	Consolation Round	5th place
1990	Bern / Fribourg, Switzerland	Pentti Matikainen	Arto Ruotanen	Consolation Round	6th place
1991	Turku / Helsinki / Tampere, Finland	Pentti Matikainen	Hannu Virta	Consolation Round	5th place
1992	Prague / Bratislava, Czechoslovakia	Pentti Matikainen	Pekka Tuomisto	Final	Silver
1993	Dortmund / Munich, Germany	Pentti Matikainen	Timo Jutila	Quarter-finals	7th place
1994	Bolzano / Canazei / Milan, Italy	(Sweden) Curt Lindström	Timo Jutila	Final	Silver
1995	Stockholm / Gävle, Sweden	(Sweden) Curt Lindström	Timo Jutila	Final	Gold
1996	Vienna, Austria	(Sweden) Curt Lindström	Timo Jutila	Quarter-finals	5th place
1997	Helsinki / Turku / Tampere, Finland	(Sweden) Curt Lindström	Timo Jutila	Second Round	5th place
1998	Zürich / Basel, Switzerland	Hannu Aravirta	Ville Peltonen	Final	Silver
1999	Oslo / Lillehammer / Hamar, Norway	Hannu Aravirta	Saku Koivu	Final	Silver
2000	Saint Petersburg, Russia	Hannu Aravirta	Raimo Helminen	3rd Place Game	Bronze
2001	Cologne / Hanover / Nuremberg, Germany	Hannu Aravirta	Petteri Nummelin	Final	Silver
2002	Gothenburg / Karlstad / Jönköping, Sweden	Hannu Aravirta	Raimo Helminen	3rd Place Game	4th place
2003	Helsinki / Tampere / Turku, Finland	Hannu Aravirta	Saku Koivu	Quarter-finals	5th place
2004	Prague / Ostrava, Czech Republic	Raimo Summanen	Olli Jokinen	Quarter-finals	6th place
2005	Innsbruck / Vienna, Austria	Erkka Westerlund	Ville Peltonen	Quarter-finals	7th place
2006	Riga, Latvia	Erkka Westerlund	Ville Peltonen	3rd Place Game	Bronze
2007	Moscow / Mytishchi, Russia	Erkka Westerlund	Ville Peltonen	Final	Silver
2008	Quebec City / Halifax, Canada	(Canada) Doug Shedden	Ville Peltonen	3rd Place Game	Bronze
2009	Bern / Kloten, Switzerland	Jukka Jalonen	Sami Kapanen	Quarter-finals	5th place
2010	Cologne / Mannheim / Gelsenkirchen, Germany	Jukka Jalonen	Sami Kapanen	Quarter-finals	6th place
2011	Bratislava / Košice, Slovakia	Jukka Jalonen	Mikko Koivu	Final	Gold
2012	Helsinki, Finland / Stockholm, Sweden	Jukka Jalonen	Mikko Koivu	3rd Place Game	4th place
2013	Stockholm, Sweden / Helsinki, Finland	Jukka Jalonen	Lasse Kukkonen	3rd Place Game	4th place
2014	Minsk, Belarus	Erkka Westerlund	Olli Jokinen	Final	Silver
2015	Prague / Ostrava, Czech Republic	Kari Jalonen	Jussi Jokinen	Quarter-finals	6th place
2016	Moscow / Saint Petersburg, Russia	Kari Jalonen	Mikko Koivu	Final	Silver
2017	Cologne, Germany / Paris, France	Lauri Marjamäki	Lasse Kukkonen	3rd Place Game	4th place
2018	Copenhagen / Herning, Denmark	Lauri Marjamäki	Mikael Granlund	Quarter-finals	5th place
2019	Bratislava / Košice, Slovakia	Jukka Jalonen	Marko Anttila	Final	Gold
2021	Riga, Latvia	Jukka Jalonen	Marko Anttila	Final	Silver
2022	Tampere / Helsinki, Finland	Jukka Jalonen	Valtteri Filppula	Final	Gold
2023	Tampere, Finland / Riga, Latvia	Jukka Jalonen	Marko Anttila	Quarter-finals	7th place
2024	Prague / Ostrava, Czech Republic	Jukka Jalonen	Mikael Granlund	Quarter-finals	8th place
2025	Stockholm, Sweden / Herning, Denmark	Antti Pennanen	Mikko Lehtonen	Quarter-finals	7th place
2026	Zürich / Fribourg, Switzerland	Antti Pennanen	Aleksander Barkov	Final	Gold
2027	Düsseldorf / Mannheim, Germany	Future event			

Medals
Participations	Gold	Silver	Bronze	Total
72	5	9	3	17

=== Canada Cup / World Cup ===
Year	GP	W	OW	T	OL	L	GF	GA	Coach	Captain	Finish	Rank
1976	5	1	–	0	–	4	16	42	Lasse Heikkilä	Veli-Pekka Ketola	Round-robin	6th
1981	5	0	–	1	–	4	6	31	Kalevi Numminen	Veli-Pekka Ketola	Round-robin	6th
1984	Not invited											
1987	5	0	–	0	–	5	9	23	Rauno Korpi	Jari Kurri	Round-robin	6th
1991	6	2	–	1	–	3	13	20	Pentti Matikainen	Jari Kurri	Semi-final	3rd

Year	GP	W	OW	T	OL	L	GF	GA	Coach	Captain	Finish	Rank
1996	4	2	–	0	–	2	17	16	(Sweden) Curt Lindström	Jari Kurri	Quarter-final	5th
2004	6	4	0	1	0	1	17	9	Raimo Summanen	Saku Koivu	Final	2nd
2016	3	0	0	–	0	3	1	9	Lauri Marjamäki	Mikko Koivu	Group stage	8th
2028				–								

Medals
Participations	Championships
7	0

=== Euro Hockey Tour ===
- 1996–97 – Finished in (gold)
- 1997–98 – Finished in (bronze)
- 1998–99 – Finished in (silver)
- 1999–00 – Finished in (gold)
- 2000–01 – Finished in (gold)
- 2001–02 – Finished in (gold)
- 2002–03 – Finished in (gold)
- 2003–04 – Finished in (gold)
- 2004–05 – Finished in (bronze)
- 2005–06 – Finished in (bronze)
- 2006–07 – Finished in 4th place
- 2007–08 – Finished in (silver)
- 2008–09 – Finished in (silver)
- 2009–10 – Finished in (gold)
- 2010–11 – Finished in (bronze)
- 2011–12 – Finished in (silver)
- 2012–13 – Finished in (bronze)
- 2013–14 – Finished in (gold)
- 2014–15 – Finished in (silver)
- 2015–16 – Finished in (silver)
- 2016–17 – Finished in (bronze)
- 2017–18 – Finished in (gold)
- 2018–19 – Finished in (silver)
- 2019–20 – Finished in (bronze)
- 2020–21 – Finished in 4th place
- 2021–22 – Finished in (silver)
- 2022–23 – Finished in (bronze)
- 2023–24 – Finished in (silver)
- 2024–25 – Finished in (silver)
- 2025–26 – Finished in (bronze)
- 2026–27 –

=== EHT Medal table ===
Gold	Silver	Bronze	Medals
9	10	9	28

==== Tournament summary ====
- Karjala Tournament:
  - (gold) Gold medal (1996, 1998, 1999, 2000, 2002 (April), 2002 (November), 2003, 2004, 2005, 2010, 2013, 2017, 2024, 2026)
  - (silver) Silver medal (1995, 2009, 2011, 2012, 2014, 2015, 2018, 2019, 2021)
  - (bronze) Bronze medal (2016, 2020, 2023, 2025)
- Channel One Cup / Izvestia Trophy:
  - (gold) Gold medal (2003, 2009, 2021)
  - (silver) Silver medal (1982, 2002, 2004, 2005, 2006, 2007, 2008, 2013, 2014, 2018)
  - (bronze) Bronze medal (1968, 1971, 1973, 1979, 1980, 1984, 1989, 1994, 1996, 1998, 1999, 2000, 2012, 2015, 2016, 2017, 2019, 2020)
- Sweden Hockey Games:
  - (gold) Gold medal (1997, 1999, 2000, 2010, 2013, 2014, 2018, 2024, 2025, 2026)
  - (silver) Silver medal (2001 (February), 2006, 2008, 2023)
  - (bronze) Bronze medal (1991, 1998, 2001 (November), 2009, 2011, 2020, 2021)
- Czech Hockey Games:
  - (gold) Gold medal (1996, 2000, 2001, 2003, 2012, 2013 (August), 2024)
  - (silver) Silver medal (1997, 1998, 1999, 2006, 2017, 2018, 2019)
  - (bronze) Bronze medal (2008, 2009 (April), 2009 (September), 2011, 2021, 2022, 2026)
- Swiss Ice Hockey Games:
  - (silver) Silver medal (2024)
  - (bronze) Bronze medal (2022, 2023, 2025)

==== Finland's Euro Hockey Tour (EHT) Cup medal table ====
Tournament	Gold	Silver	Bronze	Medals
Karjala Tournament	14	9	4	27
Channel One Cup	3	10	18	31
Sweden Hockey Games	10	4	7	21
Czech Hockey Games	7	7	7	21
Swiss Ice Hockey Games	0	1	3	4
Total	34	31	39	104

=== Euro Hockey Challenge ===
- 2011 – (gold)
- 2012 – (bronze)
- 2013 – (silver)
- 2014 – (silver)
- 2015 – (bronze)
- 2016 – (gold)
- 2017 – (silver)
- 2018 – (silver)
- 2019 – (silver) (Division Nord)

=== Winter World University Games ===
- 1962 – Did not participate
- 1966 – 5th
- 1968 – 4th
- 1970 – (bronze)
- 1972 – Did not participate
- 1981 – (silver)
- 1983 – 5th
- 1985 – (bronze)
- 1987 – 4th
- 1989 – (bronze)
- 1991 – (bronze)
- 1993 – Did not participate
- 1995 – 4th
- 1997 – (silver)
- 1999 – 5th
- 2001 – Did not participate
- 2003 – 5th
- 2005 – (bronze)
- 2007 – 4th
- From 2009 – Did not participate

=== Other tournaments ===
- NHL 4 Nations Face-Off: 4th (2025)
- Deutschland Cup: (gold) Gold medal (1990)
- Nissan Cup: (gold) Gold medal (1989, 1994)
- Spengler Cup: (silver) Silver medal (1975)
- Goodwill Games: 6th (1990)

== Team ==
=== Current roster ===
Roster for the 2026 IIHF World Championship.

Head coach: Antti Pennanen

No.	Pos.	Name	Height	Weight	Birthdate	Team
3	D	Olli Määttä – A	1.88 m (6 ft 2 in)	94 kg (207 lb)	22 August 1994 (age 32)	(United States) Minnesota Wild
4	D	Mikko Lehtonen – A	1.83 m (6 ft 0 in)	86 kg (190 lb)	16 January 1994 (age 32)	(Switzerland) ZSC Lions
10	D	Henri Jokiharju	1.83 m (6 ft 0 in)	91 kg (201 lb)	17 June 1999 (age 27)	(United States) Boston Bruins
13	F	Jesse Puljujärvi	1.92 m (6 ft 4 in)	98 kg (216 lb)	7 May 1998 (age 28)	(Switzerland) Genève-Servette Hockey Club
15	F	Anton Lundell	1.86 m (6 ft 1 in)	89 kg (196 lb)	3 October 2001 (age 25)	(United States) Florida Panthers
16	F	Aleksander Barkov – C	1.92 m (6 ft 4 in)	97 kg (214 lb)	2 September 1995 (age 31)	(United States) Florida Panthers
18	D	Vili Saarijärvi	1.78 m (5 ft 10 in)	82 kg (181 lb)	15 May 1997 (age 29)	(Switzerland) Genève-Servette Hockey Club
19	F	Waltteri Merelä	1.90 m (6 ft 3 in)	95 kg (209 lb)	6 July 1998 (age 28)	(Switzerland) SC Bern
21	F	Patrik Puistola	1.83 m (6 ft 0 in)	82 kg (181 lb)	11 January 2001 (age 25)	(Sweden) Örebro HK
23	F	Sami Päivärinta	1.75 m (5 ft 9 in)	83 kg (183 lb)	8 June 2003 (age 23)	(Finland) HPK
24	F	Hannes Björninen	1.85 m (6 ft 1 in)	91 kg (201 lb)	19 October 1995 (age 31)	(Switzerland) SCL Tigers
27	F	Janne Kuokkanen	1.85 m (6 ft 1 in)	88 kg (194 lb)	25 May 1998 (age 28)	(Sweden) Malmö Redhawks
29	G	Harri Säteri	1.86 m (6 ft 1 in)	92 kg (203 lb)	29 December 1989 (age 36)	(Switzerland) EHC Biel
31	G	Justus Annunen	1.93 m (6 ft 4 in)	95 kg (209 lb)	11 March 2000 (age 26)	(United States) Nashville Predators
33	D	Nikolas Matinpalo	1.90 m (6 ft 3 in)	94 kg (207 lb)	5 October 1998 (age 28)	(Canada) Ottawa Senators
34	F	Aatu Räty	1.88 m (6 ft 2 in)	90 kg (200 lb)	14 November 2002 (age 23)	(Canada) Vancouver Canucks
37	F	Eemil Erholtz	1.81 m (5 ft 11 in)	86 kg (190 lb)	25 March 2000 (age 26)	(Finland) Oulun Kärpät
41	D	Ville Heinola	1.82 m (6 ft 0 in)	82 kg (181 lb)	2 March 2001 (age 25)	(Canada) Winnipeg Jets
55	D	Mikael Seppälä	1.87 m (6 ft 2 in)	96 kg (212 lb)	8 March 1994 (age 32)	(Czech Republic) HC Sparta Praha
58	D	Urho Vaakanainen	1.88 m (6 ft 2 in)	93 kg (205 lb)	1 January 1999 (age 27)	(United States) New York Rangers
64	F	Mikael Granlund – A	1.79 m (5 ft 10 in)	84 kg (185 lb)	26 February 1992 (age 34)	(United States) Anaheim Ducks
65	F	Sakari Manninen	1.72 m (5 ft 8 in)	80 kg (180 lb)	10 February 1992 (age 34)	(Switzerland) Genève-Servette Hockey Club
70	G	Joonas Korpisalo	1.93 m (6 ft 4 in)	91 kg (201 lb)	28 April 1994 (age 32)	(United States) New York Rangers
80	F	Saku Mäenalanen	1.92 m (6 ft 4 in)	96 kg (212 lb)	29 May 1994 (age 32)	(Switzerland) SCL Tigers
86	F	Teuvo Teräväinen	1.80 m (5 ft 11 in)	86 kg (190 lb)	11 September 1994 (age 32)	(United States) Chicago Blackhawks
92	F	Lenni Hämeenaho	1.85 m (6 ft 1 in)	90 kg (200 lb)	7 November 2004 (age 22)	(United States) New Jersey Devils
94	F	Konsta Helenius	1.81 m (5 ft 11 in)	84 kg (185 lb)	11 May 2006 (age 20)	(United States) Buffalo Sabres

=== 2026 Olympics roster ===
The first six players of Finland's roster were announced on 16 June 2025. Aleksander Barkov was initially one of the six named to the roster on 16 June 2025, but suffered a torn ACL and MCL during training camp for the 2025–26 NHL season. He was subsequently ruled out for the following seven to nine months, including the Olympics. The final roster was named on 2 January 2026. On 3 February, Ukko-Pekka Luukkonen was ruled out due to injury, and was replaced by Joonas Korpisalo. On 8 February, Mikael Granlund was named Finland's captain, with Sebastian Aho and Mikko Rantanen serving as alternate captains.

Head coach: Antti Pennanen

No.	Pos.	Name	Height	Weight	Birthdate	Team
3	D	Olli Määttä	1.88 m (6 ft 2 in)	94 kg (207 lb)	22 August 1994 (aged 31)	(United States) Utah Mammoth
4	D	Mikko Lehtonen	1.83 m (6 ft 0 in)	89 kg (196 lb)	16 January 1994 (aged 32)	(Switzerland) ZSC Lions
10	D	Henri Jokiharju	1.83 m (6 ft 0 in)	91 kg (201 lb)	17 June 1999 (aged 26)	(United States) Boston Bruins
15	F	Anton Lundell	1.85 m (6 ft 1 in)	89 kg (196 lb)	3 October 2001 (aged 24)	(United States) Florida Panthers
20	F	Sebastian Aho – A	1.83 m (6 ft 0 in)	82 kg (181 lb)	26 July 1997 (aged 28)	(United States) Carolina Hurricanes
23	D	Esa Lindell	1.93 m (6 ft 4 in)	98 kg (216 lb)	23 May 1994 (aged 31)	(United States) Dallas Stars
24	F	Roope Hintz	1.93 m (6 ft 4 in)	97 kg (214 lb)	17 November 1996 (aged 29)	(United States) Dallas Stars
27	F	Eetu Luostarinen	1.93 m (6 ft 4 in)	87 kg (192 lb)	2 September 1998 (aged 27)	(United States) Florida Panthers
28	F	Eeli Tolvanen	1.78 m (5 ft 10 in)	87 kg (192 lb)	22 April 1999 (aged 26)	(United States) Seattle Kraken
32	G	Kevin Lankinen	1.88 m (6 ft 2 in)	90 kg (198 lb)	28 April 1995 (aged 30)	(Canada) Vancouver Canucks
33	D	Nikolas Matinpalo	1.91 m (6 ft 3 in)	97 kg (214 lb)	5 October 1998 (aged 27)	(Canada) Ottawa Senators
40	F	Joel Armia	1.93 m (6 ft 4 in)	98 kg (216 lb)	31 May 1993 (aged 32)	(United States) Los Angeles Kings
41	D	Miro Heiskanen	1.88 m (6 ft 2 in)	89 kg (196 lb)	18 July 1999 (aged 26)	(United States) Dallas Stars
55	D	Rasmus Ristolainen	1.96 m (6 ft 5 in)	94 kg (207 lb)	27 October 1994 (aged 31)	(United States) Philadelphia Flyers
56	F	Erik Haula	1.80 m (5 ft 11 in)	86 kg (190 lb)	23 March 1991 (aged 34)	(United States) Nashville Predators
62	F	Artturi Lehkonen	1.80 m (5 ft 11 in)	81 kg (179 lb)	4 July 1995 (aged 30)	(United States) Colorado Avalanche
64	F	Mikael Granlund – C	1.78 m (5 ft 10 in)	84 kg (185 lb)	26 February 1992 (aged 33)	(United States) Anaheim Ducks
70	G	Joonas Korpisalo	1.93 m (6 ft 4 in)	91 kg (201 lb)	28 April 1994 (aged 31)	(United States) Boston Bruins
74	G	Juuse Saros	1.80 m (5 ft 11 in)	81 kg (179 lb)	19 April 1995 (aged 30)	(United States) Nashville Predators
77	D	Niko Mikkola	2.01 m (6 ft 7 in)	92 kg (203 lb)	27 April 1996 (aged 29)	(United States) Florida Panthers
84	F	Kaapo Kakko	1.85 m (6 ft 1 in)	97 kg (214 lb)	13 February 2001 (aged 24)	(United States) Seattle Kraken
86	F	Teuvo Teräväinen	1.80 m (5 ft 11 in)	86 kg (190 lb)	11 September 1994 (aged 31)	(United States) Chicago Blackhawks
91	F	Oliver Kapanen	1.88 m (6 ft 2 in)	88 kg (194 lb)	29 July 2003 (aged 22)	(Canada) Montreal Canadiens
94	F	Joel Kiviranta	1.80 m (5 ft 11 in)	84 kg (185 lb)	23 March 1996 (aged 29)	(United States) Colorado Avalanche
96	F	Mikko Rantanen – A	1.96 m (6 ft 5 in)	97 kg (214 lb)	29 October 1996 (aged 29)	(United States) Dallas Stars

== Uniform evolution ==
National team jerseys

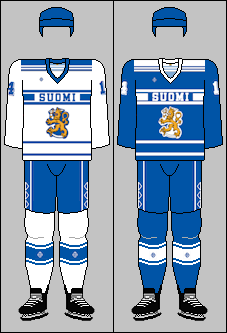
1988 Olympic jerseys

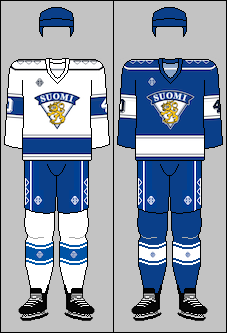
1992 Olympic jerseys

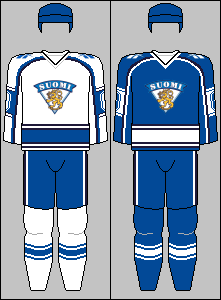
1994 Olympic jerseys

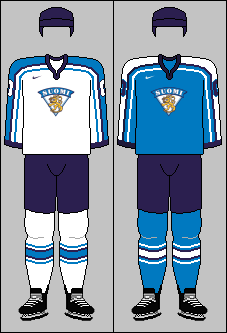
IIHF jerseys 1998–2004

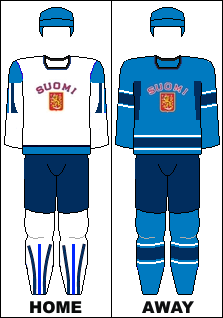
2010 Olympic jerseys

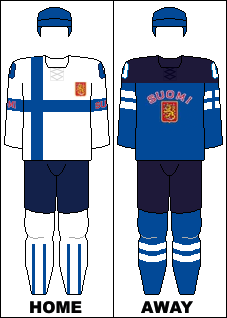
2014 Olympic jerseys

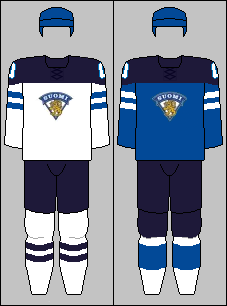
2014–2017 IIHF jerseys

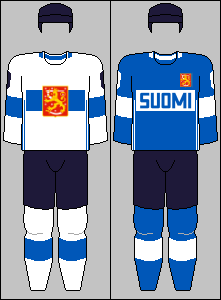
2016 World Cup of hockey jerseys

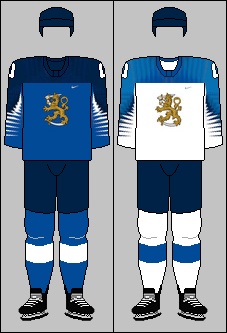
2018 Olympic jerseys

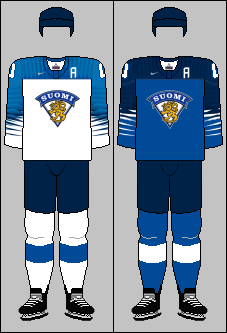
2018–2021 IIHF jerseys

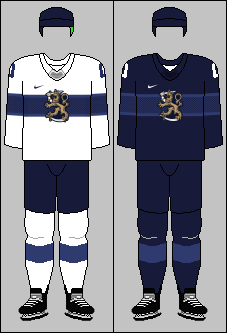
2022 Olympic jerseys

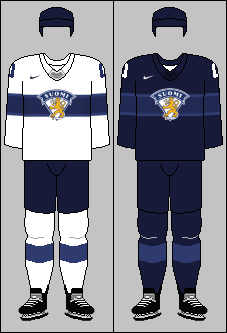
2022–present IIHF jerseys

=== Retired jerseys ===
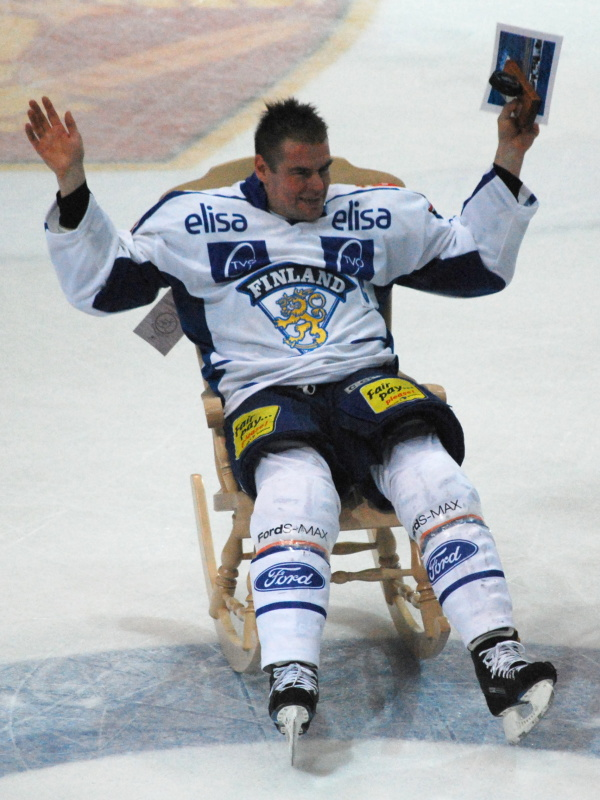
Raimo Helminen in the chair after his last international match

Finland men's national retired numbers
No.	Player	Position	Career	Year of retirement
5	Timo Jutila	D	1979–1999	2018
8	Teemu Selänne	RW	1987–2014	2015
11	Saku Koivu	C	1992–2014	2015
14	Raimo Helminen	C	1982–2008	2010
16	Ville Peltonen	LW	1991–2014	2015
17	Jari Kurri	RW	1977–1998	2007
26	Jere Lehtinen	RW	1992–2010	2015
44	Kimmo Timonen	D	1991–2015	2018

=== Notable players ===
- Keijo Kuusela 1948–1952
- Aarne Honkavaara 1948–1952
- Unto Wiitala 1949–1957
- Teppo Rastio 1954–1962
- Raimo Kilpiö 1957–1967
- Heino Pulli 1958–1965
- Matti Keinonen 1962–1973
- Urpo Ylönen 1963–1978
- Lasse Oksanen 1964–1977
- Lalli Partinen 1965–1973
- Esa Peltonen 1967–1980
- Veli-Pekka Ketola 1968–1981
- Heikki Riihiranta 1970–1976
- Juhani Tamminen 1970–1982
- Pekka Rautakallio 1972–1983
- Matti Hagman 1975–1987
- Reijo Ruotsalainen 1978–1989
- Kari Eloranta 1979–1992
- Jari Kurri 1979–1998
- Hannu Kamppuri 1981–1987
- Ilkka Sinisalo 1981–1983
- Petri Skriko 1982–1992
- Christian Ruuttu 1984–1996
- Timo Jutila 1983–1997
- Raimo Helminen 1983–2008
- Timo Blomqvist 1985–1992
- Jukka Tammi 1985–1998
- Esa Tikkanen 1985–2000
- Markus Ketterer 1987–1996
- Jarmo Myllys 1987–2001
- Janne Ojanen 1987–2002
- Teppo Numminen 1987–2006
- Jyrki Lumme 1988–2002
- Mika Nieminen 1991–1998
- Teemu Selänne 1991–2014
- Jere Lehtinen 1992–2010
- Saku Koivu 1993–2010
- Sami Kapanen 1994–2010
- Ville Peltonen 1994–2012
- Ari Sulander 1995–2003
- Janne Niinimaa 1995–2009
- Petteri Nummelin 1995–2010
- Kimmo Timonen 1996–2014
- Olli Jokinen 1997–2014
- Jarkko Ruutu 1998–2010
- Jere Karalahti 1998–2014
- Miikka Kiprusoff 1999–2010
- Sami Salo 2001–2014
- Niklas Hagman 2002–2013
- Ville Nieminen 2002–2006
- Mikko Koivu 2003–2016
- Jussi Jokinen 2003–2016
- Tuomo Ruutu 2004–2015
- Pekka Rinne 2004–2016
- Tuukka Rask 2005–2016
- Leo Komarov 2009–
- Valtteri Filppula 2010–2022
- Mikael Granlund 2010–
- Marko Anttila 2011–2023
- Teuvo Teräväinen 2012–
- Aleksander Barkov 2013–
- Olli Määttä 2014–
- Erik Haula 2014–
- Juuse Saros 2014–
- Sebastian Aho 2015–
- Mikko Rantanen 2015–
- Rasmus Ristolainen 2016–
- Patrik Laine 2016–
- Jesse Puljujärvi 2017–
- Mikko Lehtonen 2017–
- Sakari Manninen 2018–
- Eeli Tolvanen 2018–
- Miro Heiskanen 2018–
- Kaapo Kakko 2019–
- Juho Olkinuora 2019–
- Anton Lundell 2021–
- Joel Armia 2022–
- Konsta Helenius 2024–

=== List of head coaches ===
- Erkki Saarinen 1939–1941
- Risto Lindroos 1945–1946
- Henry Kvist 1946–1949
- Risto Lindroos 1950–1954
- Aarne Honkavaara 1954–1959
- Joe Wirkkunen 1959–1960
- Derek Holmes 1960–1961
- Joe Wirkkunen 1961–1966
- Augustin "Gustav" Bubník 1966–1969
- Seppo Liitsola 1969–1972
- Len Lunde 1972–1973
- Kalevi Numminen 1973–1974
- Seppo Liitsola 1974–1976
- Lasse Heikkilä 1976–1977
- Kalevi Numminen 1977–1982
- Alpo Suhonen 1982–1986
- Rauno Korpi 1986–1987
- Pentti Matikainen 1987–1993
- Curt Lindström 1993–1997
- Hannu Aravirta 1997–2003
- Raimo Summanen 2003–2004
- Erkka Westerlund 2004–2007
- Doug Shedden 2007–2008
- Jukka Jalonen 2008–2013
- Erkka Westerlund 2013–2014
- Kari Jalonen 2014–2016
- Lauri Marjamäki 2016–18
- Jukka Jalonen 2018–2024
- Antti Pennanen 2025-Present

== Video games ==
Since NHL 98, Finland national team have appeared in EA Sports' NHL series.
