= Matti Reunamäki =

Finnish ice hockey player (1940–2023)

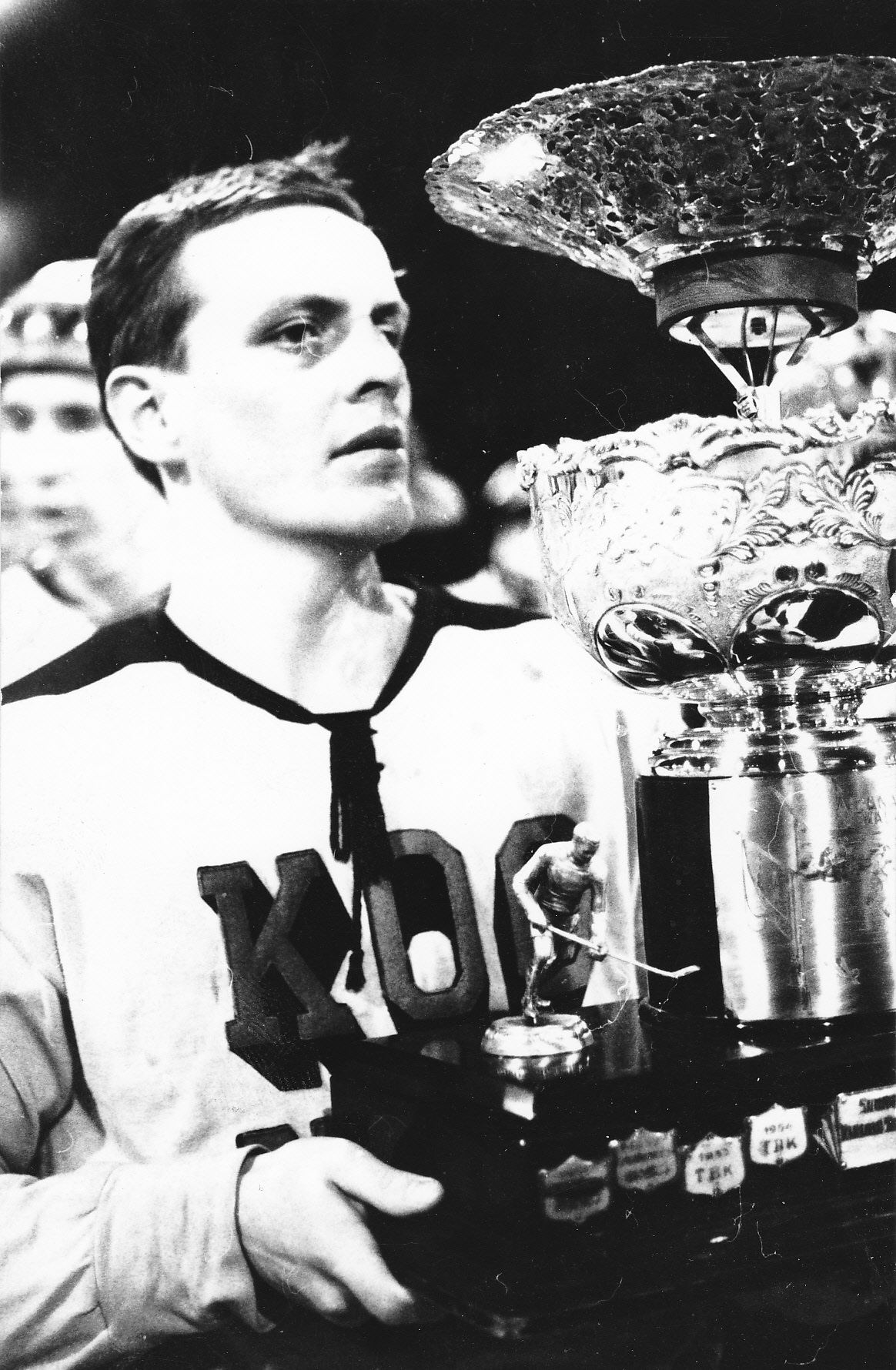
- Born: 25 July 1940; Tampere, Finland
- Died: 3 November 2023 (aged 83); Tampere, Finland
- Position: Forward
- Shot: Left
- Played for: TK-V/KOOVEE
- National team: Finland
- Playing career: 1958–1969

Matti Johannes Reunamäki (25 July 1940 – 3 November 2023) was a Finnish professional ice hockey player who played in the SM-liiga. He played for KooVee throughout his career. He was inducted into the Finnish Hockey Hall of Fame in 1986. He died in Tampere on 3 November 2023, at the age of 83.
