= Seppo Liitsola =

Finnish ice hockey player

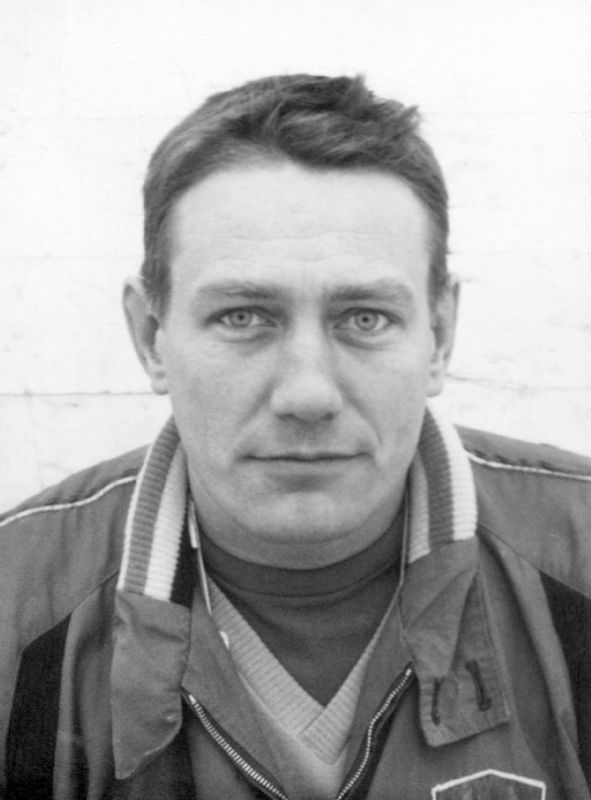
- Born: February 7, 1933; Tampere, Finland
- Died: July 18, 2012 (aged 79); Tampere, Finland
- Position: Forward
- Shot: Left
- Played for: TBK; Tappara
- National team: Finland
- Playing career: 1951–1964

Seppo Liitsola (7 February 1933 – 18 July 2012) was a professional ice hockey player who played in the SM-liiga. He played ice hockey for Tappara and TBK. He was inducted into the Finnish Hockey Hall of Fame in 1986.

Liitsola coached the national team of Finland from 1969 to 1976. Liitsola died on 18 July 2012, at the age of 79, in Tampere, Finland.

Preceded by Augustin "Gustav" Bubník	Finnish national ice hockey team coach 1969–1972	Succeeded by Len Lunde
Preceded by Len Lunde	Finnish national ice hockey team coach 1973–1977	Succeeded by Lasse Heikkilä
