= Pentti Matikainen =

Finnish ice hockey player and coach (1950–2025)

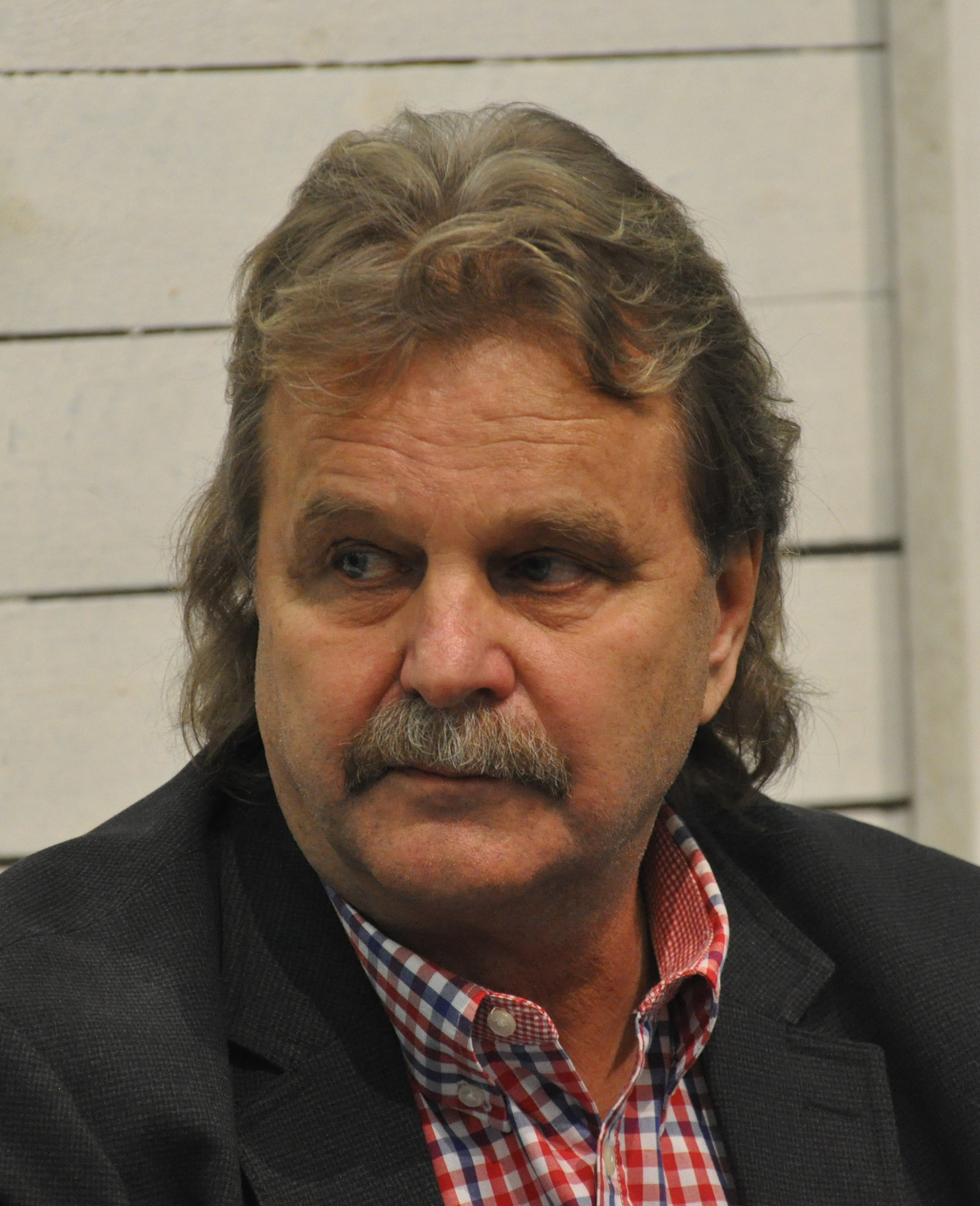
- Born: 5 October 1950; Joensuu, Finland
- Died: 29 June 2025 (aged 74); Helsinki, Finland
- Occupation: Ice hockey coach

Medal record

Representing Finland

Men's ice hockey

Winter Olympics
Silver medal – second place	1988 Calgary	

Canada Cup
Bronze medal – third place	1991 Hamilton	

World Championships
Silver medal – second place	1992 Czechoslovakia	

European Championship
Bronze medal – third place	1991 Finland	

Pentti Matikainen (5 October 1950 – 29 June 2025) was a Finnish hockey coach and general manager. He was selected the SM-liiga coach of the year in 1984. As the coach of the Finland national team, he led Finland to silver medals in the 1988 Winter Olympics and the 1992 World Championships, and to third place in the 1991 Canada Cup. Matikainen was the coach of HIFK from 1987 to 1990 and its CEO from 2001 to 2008. Matikainen died from Primary central nervous system lymphoma (cancer) on 29 June 2025, at the age of 74.

== Coaching awards and honours ==
head coach

- (silver) (1): Calgary 1988 (Winter Olympics)
- (silver) (1): 1992 IIHF World Championship
- (bronze) (1): 1991 Canada Cup
- (bronze) Izvestia Trophy (1): 1989
- (silver) SM-liiga (1): 1986–87
- (bronze) SM-liiga, (5): 1983–84, 1984–85, 1985–86, 1987–88, 1995–96

== Sources ==
- Pentti Matikainen at IMDb
- Biographical information and career statistics from Eliteprospects.com, or Eurohockey.com, or The Internet Hockey Database

Preceded by Rauno Korpi	Finnish national ice hockey team coach 1987–1993	Succeeded by Curt Lindström
Preceded by Juhani Wahlsten	Finnish U20 national ice hockey team coach 1983–1986	Succeeded by Hannu Jortikka
