= Alpo Suhonen =

Finnish former ice hockey coach (born 1948)

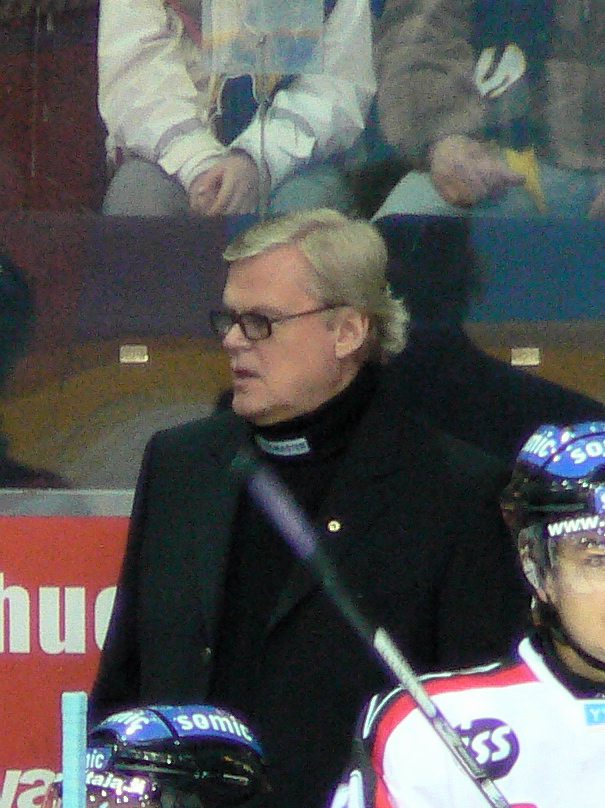
- Suhonen in 2008
- Born: 17 June 1948 (age 78) Valkeakoski, Finland
- Coached for: Zürcher SC (1986–1988); HPK (1988-1989); Moncton Hawks (1989-1990); Jokerit (1993-1994); EHC Kloten (1994-1996); Chicago Wolves (1997; interim); Chicago Blackhawks (2000-2001); HIFK (2002-2003); SC Bern (2004-2006); Ässät (2007-2009); HC 05 Banska Bystrica (2011-2012)
- Coaching career: 1970–2017

Alpo Suhonen (born 17 June 1948) is a Finnish former ice hockey coach.

He became the first European-born and trained NHL head coach in 2000 when the Chicago Blackhawks signed him to a three-year contract on 22 May 2000. Ivan Hlinka signed with the Pittsburgh Penguins a month later, on 21 June 2000.

== Coaching career ==
Suhonen worked for the Finnish ice hockey federation in the late 1970s until 1986. He coached the junior national teams and took charge of the men's national team in 1982. He was head coach of Team Finland at the 1984 Olympic Games and at four World Championships.

After coaching Zürcher SC of Switzerland for two years (1986–1988) and a short stint at the helm of Finnish Liiga side HPK, he served as head coach of AHL's Moncton Hawks in 1989 and then joined the coaching staff of the Winnipeg Jets, working as an assistant.

In 1993–94, Suhonen coached Jokerit to the Finnish championship and then embarked on a two-year stint with EHC Kloten. He guided the team to back-to-back Swiss championships in 1995 and 1996.

In March 1997, he was named head coach of IHL's Chicago Wolves on an interim basis, but did not return for the following season, instead, returning to Finland to coach HPK again.

He would return to North America in 1998 as an assistant coach for the Toronto Maple Leafs. Suhonen was appointed head coach of the Chicago Blackhawks in May 2000 and was the first European born head coach in the National Hockey League since Johnny Gottselig in 1948. Suhonen lasted less than a year as head coach of the Hawks, as he resigned next spring because of heart problems. There was frequent criticism to Suhonen's coaching citing lack of discipline and a country club atmosphere among the players.

Suhonen returned to Finland and served as head coach of Liiga outfit HIFK from January 2002 until the end of the 2002–03 campaign. In November 2004, he took over head coaching duties at SC Bern of the Swiss National League A (NLA). He coached the team to a NLA semifinal appearance in the 2004–05 season and to the quarterfinals the following season. He was released afterwards.

Suhonen took the head coaching job at Finnish Ässät on 14 November 2007 and remained in that job until July 2009. Later that month, he was appointed as sports director of the Kloten Flyers in Switzerland. He stepped down in August 2010 for personal reasons.

In the 2011–2012 season, he had a short stint as head coach of Slovak Extraliga club HC 05 Banska Bystrica. On the first day of November, he resigned as head coach, but he remains in the structures of the club.

In June 2012, Suhonen accepted the position as sport director of the Austrian ice hockey federation. In May 2016, he additionally took over the country's men's national team as head coach. Suhonen left the Austrian federation when his contract expired in 2017.

== Other activities ==
Suhonen also produced a Finnish version of Cat on a Hot Tin Roof and ran for a spot in the European Parliament for the Green League. At the time he was also the CEO of music festival Pori Jazz, and he has also written several books in Finnish.

== Coaching record ==
Team	Year	Regular season							Postseason
Team	Year	G	W	L	T	OTL	Pts	Finish	Result
CHI	2000–01	82	29	41	8	4	70	4th in Central	Missed playoffs

Preceded by Kalevi Numminen	Finnish national ice hockey team coach 1982–1986	Succeeded by Rauno Korpi
Preceded by Boris Majorov	Jokerit head coach 1993	Succeeded by Hannu Aravirta
Preceded by Bob Pulford	Head coaches of the Chicago Blackhawks; 2000–01	Succeeded by Brian Sutter
