= Tomi Lämsä =

Finnish ice hockey player

- Born: September 16, 1979 (age 45); Lahti, Finland
- Height: 5 ft 9 in (175 cm)
- Weight: 172 lb (78 kg; 12 st 4 lb)
- Position: Forward
- Shot: Left
- Played for: Lahti Pelicans (I-Divisioona)
- NHL draft: Undrafted
- Playing career: 1997–2002

Tomi Lämsä (born September 16, 1979) is a Finnish former professional ice hockey player. He is currently the head coach of Rauman Lukko in the SM-Liiga.

Lämsä was the head coach of the Jokerit for the 2012–13 season, remaining in that position until he was replaced by Tomek Valtonen on March 1, 2014.
