= Finnish national men's ice hockey team 1995 World Championships roster =

This is the Finnish national men's ice hockey team's roster to the 1995 IIHF Ice Hockey World Championships.

| Pos. | No. | Player | 1995 Team |
|---|---|---|---|
| GK | 30 | Jukka Tammi | (Finland) Ilves |
| GK | 31 | Ari Sulander | (Finland) Jokerit |
| GK | 35 | Jarmo Myllys | (Sweden) Luleå HF |
| D | 2 | Marko Kiprusoff | (Finland) TPS |
| D | 3 | Petteri Nummelin | (Finland) TPS |
| D | 4 | Erik Hämäläinen | (Finland) Jokerit |
| D | 5 | Timo Jutila C | (Finland) Tappara |
| D | 6 | Janne Niinimaa | (Finland) Jokerit |
| D | 23 | Hannu Virta | (Switzerland) Grasshopper Zürich |
| D | 26 | Mika Strömberg | (Finland) Jokerit |
| F | 8 | Janne Ojanen A | (Finland) / (Switzerland) Tappara & HC Lugano |
| F | 9 | Esa Keskinen | (Sweden) HV71 |
| F | 11 | Saku Koivu A | (Finland) TPS |
| F | 13 | Marko Palo | (Sweden) HV71 |
| F | 14 | Raimo Helminen | (Sweden) Malmö IF |
| F | 15 | Antti Törmänen | (Finland) Jokerit |
| F | 16 | Ville Peltonen | (Finland) HIFK |
| F | 20 | Jere Lehtinen | (Finland) TPS |
| F | 21 | Juha Ylönen | (Finland) Jokerit |
| F | 24 | Sami Kapanen | (Finland) HIFK |
| F | 27 | Tero Lehterä | (Sweden) Malmö IF |
| F | 40 | Mika Nieminen | (Sweden) Luleå HF |
| F | 52 | Raimo Summanen | (Finland) TPS |

Manager:

Heikki Riihiranta

Coaches:

Curt Lindström
Hannu Aravirta

Other personnel:

Juhani Ikonen (Medical Attendant)
Jari Rautiainen (Physio)
Veli-Matti Pohjonen (Masseur)
Tomi Mäkipää (Equipment Manager)
Aleksander Surenkin (Equipment Maintenance)
Mika Saarinen (Statistics)
Esko Nokelainen (Scouting)
