= Kari Lehtonen =

Finnish ice hockey player (born 1983)

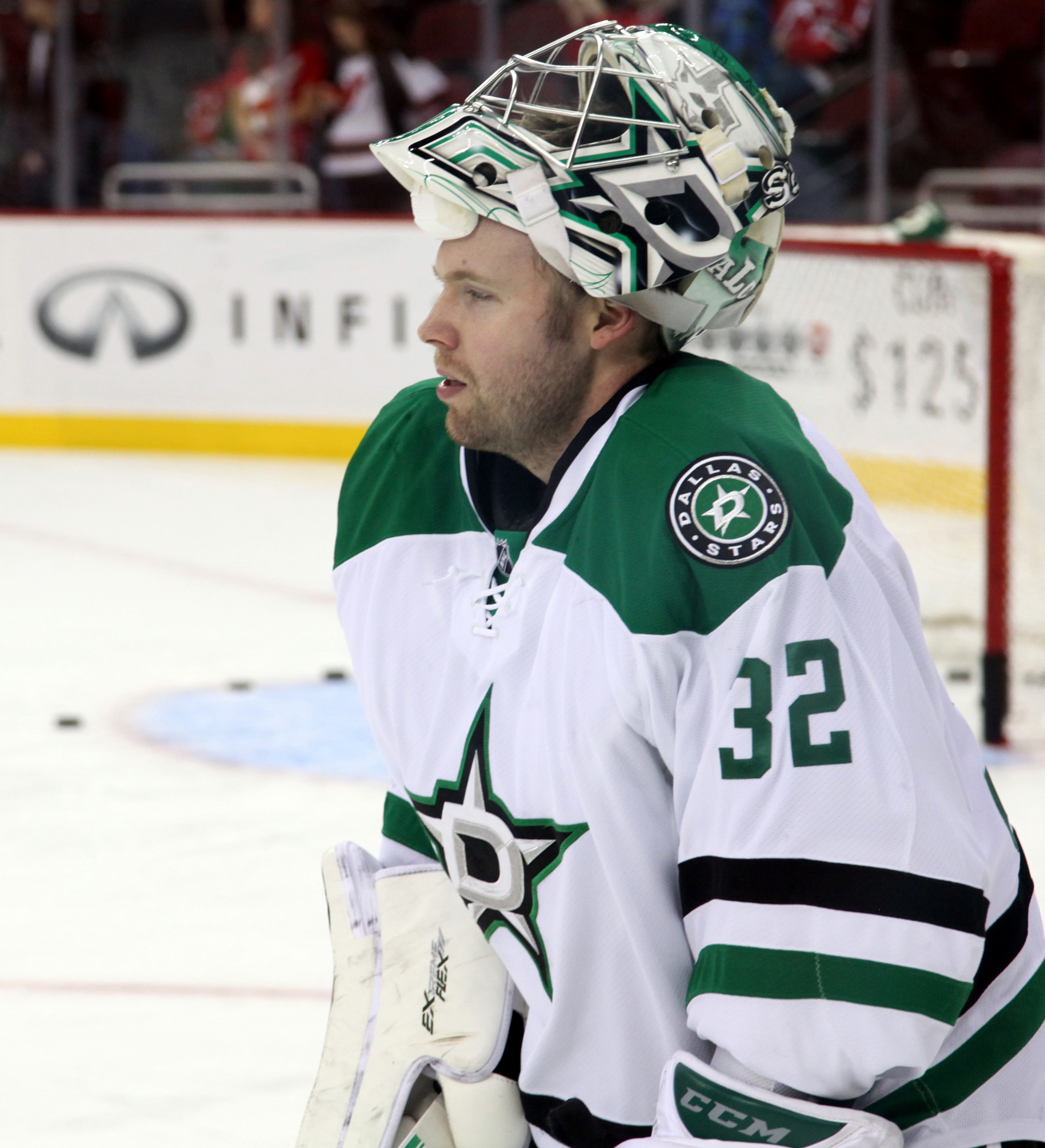
- Lehtonen with the Dallas Stars in October 2014
- Born: November 16, 1983 (age 43) Helsinki, Finland
- Height: 6 ft 4 in (193 cm)
- Weight: 210 lb (95 kg; 15 st 0 lb)
- Position: Goaltender
- Caught: Left
- Played for: Jokerit; Atlanta Thrashers; Dallas Stars
- National team: Finland
- NHL draft: 2nd overall, 2002; Atlanta Thrashers
- Playing career: 1999–2018

Kari Lehtonen (born November 16, 1983) is a Finnish former professional ice hockey goaltender who played 14 seasons in the National Hockey League (NHL) for the Atlanta Thrashers and Dallas Stars. He was selected second overall in the 2002 NHL entry draft by the Thrashers, becoming the highest-drafted European goaltender, as well as being tied with Patrik Laine, Alexander Barkov and Kaapo Kakko for the highest-drafted Finnish player in NHL history.

== Early life ==
Lehtonen was born on November 16, 1983, in Helsinki, Finland. He is the son to parents Martti and Marja Lehtonen. He also has a sister, Kirsi, and an older brother, Kimmo. His father owns a tire dealership and his mother is a nurse. Lehtonen began picking up an interest in hockey at the age of five, following his brother to his team practices, before he started playing goalie at seven years old, with the help of his personal goalie coach helping him learn the position.

== Playing career ==
=== Early years ===
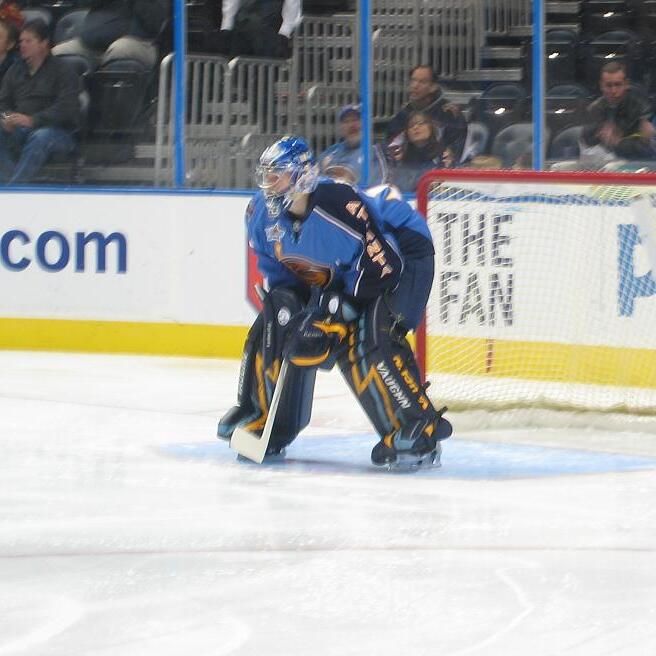
Lehtonen with the Atlanta Thrashers in March 2008

Lehtonen was drafted second overall in the 2002 NHL entry draft by the Atlanta Thrashers after an outstanding 2001–02 season in the Finnish SM-liiga and became the highest-drafted European goaltender. Lehtonen was the backup goalie for Jokerit, but captured the starting position and won the Urpo Ylönen trophy, given to the best goalie of the season, and the league's playoff MVP award, the Jari Kurri trophy. Lehtonen stayed with Jokerit for one more season before moving to North America. He was awarded the Urpo Ylönen trophy again in the 2002–03 season.

=== Atlanta Thrashers ===
After posting a 39–19–9 record, nine shutouts and a 1.91 goals-against average in 72 career games, between 2000 and 2003 with Jokerit, he officially signed with the Atlanta Thrashers in June 2003. During the 2003–04 season, Lehtonen mostly spent his time with the Chicago Wolves, the Thrashers' American Hockey League (AHL) affiliate, but he was called up for a number of occasions and played four games for the Thrashers, winning all four of them and posting one shutout. In the four games with the Thrashers, he posted a .953 save percentage and 1.25 goals against average (GAA). He earned his first shutout in the NHL on March 27, 2004, against the Florida Panthers, making 30 saves.

Lehtonen spent the 2004–05 NHL lockout season with the Wolves, adjusting to the North American playing style. He earned the AHL Second All-Star Team recognition that season and was the 2005 Calder Cup finalist. After playing 57 games for the Wolves, of which he won 38, posting .929 save percentage and 2.27 GAA, the Thrashers called him up, and Lehtonen started the 2005–06 season as the starting goalie for Atlanta. However, he failed to stay healthy for most of the season. On the opening night of the 2005–06 season, Lehtonen suffered a serious groin injury when Florida Panthers centre Nathan Horton collided with him. The injury sidelined him for the first half of the season. Lehtonen was once again injured on April 6, 2006, when Tampa Bay Lightning forward Chris Dingman collided with him; Lehtonen tried to get to his feet, but sprained his ankle in the process.

Shortly into the 2006–07 season, Lehtonen broke the Atlanta Thrashers shutout streak record previously held by Michael Garnett. The streak lasted 167 minutes and 56 seconds, before it was snapped by P.J. Axelsson of the Boston Bruins. He also set his career highs in every category. AirTran Airways, a low-cost airline, signed Lehtonen as an endorser for the 2006–07 season. On February 8, 2007, Lehtonen became the Thrashers franchise leader for wins by a goaltender with 49, surpassing Pasi Nurminen's record of 48. On April 12, 2007, Lehtonen was the starting goaltender for the Thrashers in their first Stanley Cup playoff game. He played two games in the playoffs losing both of them, where he allowed four goals in the first and allowed seven goals on 35 shots in the second.

After a rough start to the 2007–08 season, Lehtonen suffered another groin injury on October 18, 2007. He would miss 16 games before returning on December 5, 2007. He finished the season with a respectable save percentage of .916 to go along with four shutouts as the Thrashers failed to qualify for the 2008 playoffs.

In 2009, Lehtonen re-signed with the Atlanta Thrashers to a one-year, $3 million deal, after posting a 19–22–3 record with three shutouts, a 3.06 goals-against average and a .911 save percentage in 46 games for the Thrashers in the 2008–09 season. During that season, he made a career-high 49 saves against the Washington Capitals on March 16, 2009.

=== Dallas Stars ===
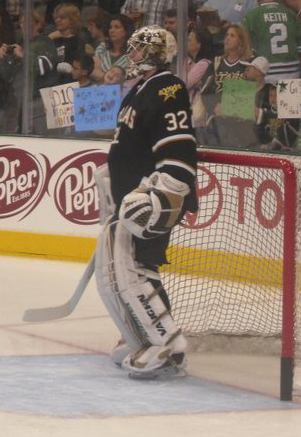
Lehtonen with the Dallas Stars in March 2011

Lehtonen re-joined the Thrashers on February 7, 2010, following a condition stint with the Chicago Wolves in January. However, on February 9, Lehtonen was traded to the Dallas Stars in exchange for Ivan Vishnevskiy and a fourth-round draft pick in the 2010 NHL entry draft (Ivan Telegin). He concluded his run with the Thrashers as a franchise leader in games played (204), goals-against average (2.87), save percentage (.912), wins (94) and shutouts (14). He spent the remainder of the season backing up Marty Turco and won six of the twelve games he played with the team.

Prior to the start of the 2010–11 season, the Stars signed Lehtonen to a three-year, $10.65 million extension. In his first full season in Dallas, Lehtonen compiled a 34–24–11 record with a 2.55 GAA in 69 games played. He led the league in wins within his first twelve starts, recording an 11–1–0 record and landing him a potential Vezina Trophy nomination. Lehtonen received his 17th career shutout against the Columbus Blue Jackets, pulling the team closer to a playoff spot. Lehtonen and the Stars narrowly missed the 2011 playoffs after losing to the Minnesota Wild on the final day of the season to eliminate them from playoff contention, finishing the season only two points behind the defending Stanley Cup champion Chicago Blackhawks for the last playoff spot. In the 2011–12 NHL season, Lehtonen posted a 32–22–4 record, 4 shutouts, a 2.33 goals against average and a .922 save percentage.

On September 4, 2012, the day before an impending lockout, Lehtonen signed a five-year, $29.5 million contract. The contract included a no-trade clause. Early on in the 2012–13 NHL season, Lehtonen was considered a potential Vezina Trophy candidate, recording a .934 save percentage, ranked third in the league at that time and a 2.12 goals against average. He was 7–2–1 in the season, before he suffered a lower-body injury against the Vancouver Canucks on February 15, 2013. He returned to the team on February 27, however, was once again injured on April 9, against the Los Angeles Kings.

Lehtonen led the NHL in minutes played during the 2013–14 season. He left a game against the Minnesota Wild after suffering a head injury in March 2014. He made the playoffs with the Stars for the first time in 2014 as the team finished as the eighth and final seed in the Western Conference where they would eventually be defeated in six games by the top seeded Anaheim Ducks. He earned his first career shutout in the playoffs in Game 1, making 37 saves.

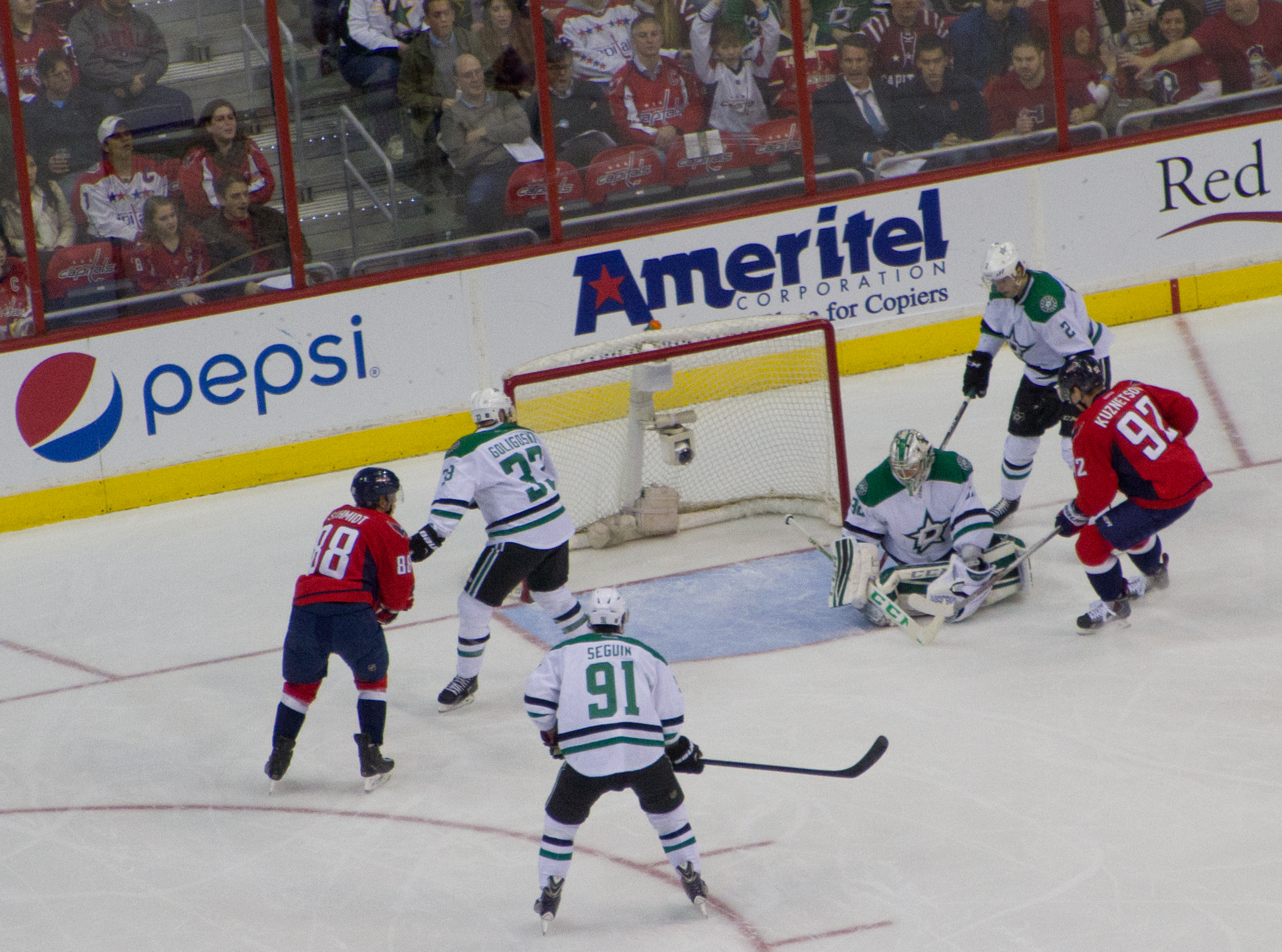
Lehtonen making a save against Evgeny Kuznetsov in March 2015

By the 2014–15 NHL season, Lehtonen's number began to falter. During a game against the Florida Panthers on March 5, 2015, he allowed three goals on eleven shots and was pulled. However, he did earn a 27 save shutout against the Los Angeles Kings back in November 2014, making an acrobatic glove save diving across the crease to rob Jarret Stoll at the edge of the crease of the second period. He finished the season with a record of 34–17–10, a goals against average of 2.94 and a .903 save percentage. The following season, Lehtonen continued to struggle. Prior to the 2015–16 season, the Stars acquired fellow Finnish goaltender Antti Niemi from the San Jose Sharks to compete with Lehtonen. They alternated regularly the next two seasons. He finished that season with a record of 25–10–2, a goals against average of 2.76 and a .906 save percentage. In the 2016 playoffs, Lehtonen established himself as the primary goalie. He earned his second career shutout in the playoffs in Game 1 against the Minnesota Wild. The Stars went on to beat the Wild in a six-game series, winning Game 6, with a score of 5–4 and earned Lehtonen his first career playoff series win. However, in Game 7 of the second round, he was pulled after giving up three goals in the first period as the Stars' season ended with a 6–1 loss to the St. Louis Blues for a 4–3 defeat in the series.

Lehtonen finished the 2016–17 NHL season with a record of 22–25–7, a 2.85 goals against average and .902 save percentage. Lehtonen and the Stars snapped the Washington Capitals' home win streak at 15 games, where he made 42 saves. He earned his 30th career shutout in a 1–0 victory against the San Jose Sharks. The Stars ultimately missed the 2017 NHL playoffs.

Following the 2016–17 NHL season, the Dallas Stars signed Ben Bishop as the team's new starter and Lehtonen transitioned into the team's backup goalie. He earned his 300th win on December 13, 2017, in a game against the New York Islanders by making 32 saves to clinch a 5–2 win. Bishop and Lehtonen became a solid goaltending tandem, as they were fifth in goals against average in the NHL by February 2018. In March 2018, Lehtonen became the team's starting goalie again after Bishop suffered a knee injury and would be out for an undisclosed period of time. Up until that point, he had a record of 12–10–3, with a 2.46 GAA and .913 save percentage. However, with the NHL playoffs on the line, he went 5–9–2, as the team ultimately missed the playoffs. Lehtonen finished the 2017–18 NHL season with a record of 15–14–3, a goals against average of 2.56 and a .912 save percentage. He played his last game with the Dallas Stars on April 7, 2018, against the Los Angeles Kings picking up a win and made 34 saves. He entered free agency in the summer of 2018. Lehtonen was left unsigned prior to the start of the 2018–19 NHL season, and though he never officially announced a retirement, he went one year remaining unsigned and decided to "close that door" on hockey.

== International play ==
Lehtonen has been selected to play for Finland's youth and national teams on many occasions. He won gold with Finland at the 2000 IIHF World U18 Championships. He finished the tournament possessing a 5–0–1 record with a 1.76 goals-against average and a .963 save percentage. He also competed in the IIHF World Junior Championship in 2001, backing up Ari Ahonen, and in 2002, where he led the team to a bronze medal and was named the top goaltender in the tournament that year. He represented Finland at the 2004 World Cup of Hockey where they placed second. He played at the 2007 IIHF World Championship tournament, where the team won silver. He was named that tournament's Top Goaltender. He also participated at the 2012 IIHF World Championship tournament, however, he suffered an injury during a game. He won a bronze medal at the 2014 Winter Olympics. He played in two games, one victory in the preliminary round and a loss in the semi-finals. He finished with a 1–1–0 record with a 1.51 goals-against average and a .935 save percentage.

== Playing style ==
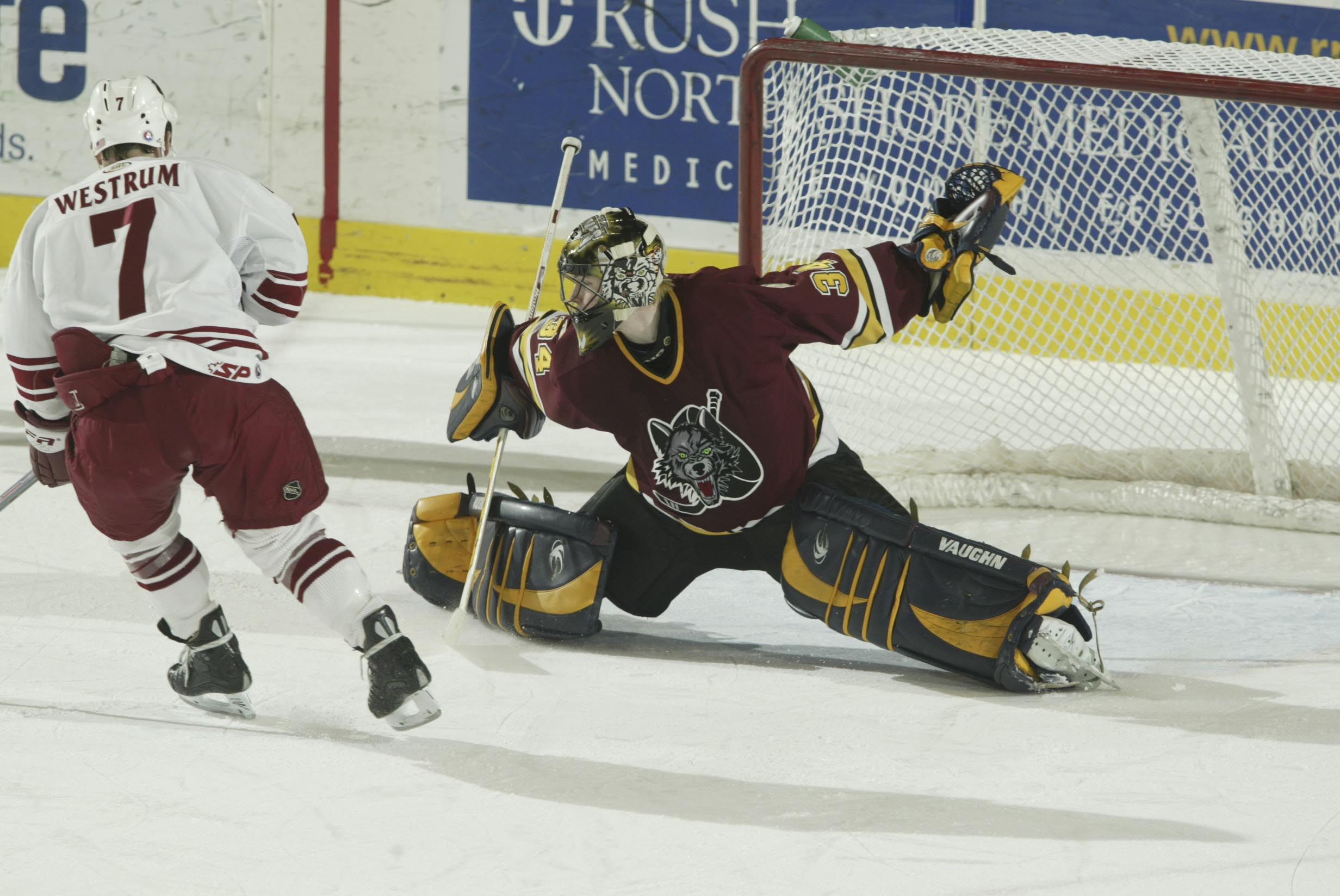
Lehtonen making a save in March 2005

Lehtonen was a goaltender who used his size to his advantage having good net coverage and has good reflexes. With his calm demeanour, he has the ability to anticipate plays and have a good sense of timing. Central Scouting describes him as a tall goaltender with hid quickness and good reflexes. Lehtonen's childhood idol was iconic Finnish goaltender Jarmo Myllys. He also cites inspiration from Patrick Roy, admiring his playing style.

== Personal life ==
On July 2, 2011, Kari married longtime girlfriend Abbe Schutter in a private ceremony at the Club at Hammock Beach in Palm Coast, Florida. Kari met Abbe while playing in Atlanta. Kari and Abbe welcomed their first child, a son, in September 2012. They welcomed their second child and son in November 2017. Since 2018, Lehtonen spends his time coaching for his son's youth hockey team.

He spent a couple of years being a guest instructor at a summer hockey program ran by Jarmo Myllys. Prior to entering the United States, he was able to work on his English with the help of former New York Rangers goalie Jamie Ram, as well as watching television shows like The Simpsons and American Idol.

Lehtonen was featured on numerous commercials for PM Standley Motorcars, under the video series Cars with Kari.

== Career statistics ==
=== Regular season and playoffs ===
			Regular season										Playoffs
Season	Team	League	GP	W	L	T	OTL	MIN	GA	SO	GAA	SV%	GP	W	L	MIN	GA	SO	GAA	SV%
1999–2000	Jokerit	FIN U20	33	21	9	3	—	1974	86	2	2.61	.904	12	9	3	758	14	4	1.11	.952
2000–01	Jokerit	FIN U20	31	20	9	1	—	1799	71	3	2.37	.911	1	0	1	54	4	4.44	0	.857
2000–01	Jokerit	SM-l	4	3	1	0	—	190	6	0	1.90	.937	—	—	—	—	—	—	—	—
2001–02	Jokerit	FIN U20	6	5	1	0	—	360	11	1	1.83	.944	—	—	—	—	—	—	—	—
2001–02	Jokerit	SM-l	23	13	5	2	—	1242	37	4	1.79	.941	11	8	2	623	18	3	1.73	.940
2002–03	Jokerit	SM-l	45	23	14	6	—	2634	87	5	1.98	.928	10	6	4	626	17	2	1.63	.941
2003–04	Chicago Wolves	AHL	39	20	14	2	—	2192	88	3	2.41	.926	10	6	4	663	23	1	2.08	.942
2003–04	Atlanta Thrashers	NHL	4	4	0	0	—	239	5	1	1.25	.953	—	—	—	—	—	—	—	—
2004–05	Chicago Wolves	AHL	57	38	17	2	—	3378	128	5	2.27	.929	16	10	6	983	28	2	1.71	.939
2005–06	Atlanta Thrashers	NHL	38	20	15	—	0	2166	106	2	2.94	.906	—	—	—	—	—	—	—	—
2006–07	Atlanta Thrashers	NHL	68	34	24	—	9	3934	183	4	2.79	.912	2	0	2	118	11	0	5.59	.849
2007–08	Atlanta Thrashers	NHL	48	17	22	—	5	2707	131	4	2.90	.916	—	—	—	—	—	—	—	—
2007–08	Chicago Wolves	AHL	2	2	0	—	0	124	4	0	1.93	.934	—	—	—	—	—	—	—	—
2008–09	Atlanta Thrashers	NHL	46	19	22	—	3	2624	134	3	3.06	.911	—	—	—	—	—	—	—	—
2009–10	Chicago Wolves	AHL	4	1	1	—	2	247	11	0	2.67	.899	—	—	—	—	—	—	—	—
2009–10	Dallas Stars	NHL	12	6	4	—	0	663	31	0	2.81	.911	—	—	—	—	—	—	—	—
2010–11	Dallas Stars	NHL	69	34	24	—	11	4119	175	3	2.55	.914	—	—	—	—	—	—	—	—
2011–12	Dallas Stars	NHL	59	32	22	—	4	3497	136	4	2.33	.922	—	—	—	—	—	—	—	—
2012–13	Dallas Stars	NHL	36	15	14	—	3	1986	88	1	2.66	.916	—	—	—	—	—	—	—	—
2013–14	Dallas Stars	NHL	65	33	20	—	10	3804	153	5	2.41	.919	6	2	4	346	19	1	3.29	.885
2014–15	Dallas Stars	NHL	65	34	17	—	10	3698	181	5	2.94	.903	—	—	—	—	—	—	—	—
2015–16	Dallas Stars	NHL	43	25	10	—	2	2280	105	2	2.76	.906	11	6	3	555	26	1	2.81	.899
2016–17	Dallas Stars	NHL	59	22	25	—	7	3178	151	3	2.85	.902	—	—	—	—	—	—	—	—
2017–18	Dallas Stars	NHL	37	15	14	—	3	1945	83	1	2.56	.912	—	—	—	—	—	—	—	—
SM-l totals			72	39	20	8	—	4,066	130	9	1.92	.933	21	14	6	1,249	35	5	1.68	.941
NHL totals			649	310	233	0	67	36,838	1,662	38	2.71	.912	19	8	9	1,019	56	2	3.30	.887

=== International ===
Year	Team	Event	GP	W	L	T	MIN	GA	SO	GAA	SV%
2000	Finland	U18	6	5	0	1	307	9	1	1.76	.963
2001	Finland	WJC	1	1	0	0	60	2	0	2.00	.920
2001	Finland	U18	4	3	1	0	239	7	2	1.76	.935
2002	Finland	WJC	6	4	2	0	360	7	1	1.17	.943
2002	Finland	WC	DNP	—	—	—	—	—	—	—	—
2003	Finland	WJC	6	3	2	1	357	13	2	2.19	.923
2003	Finland	WC	DNP	—	—	—	—	—	—	—	—
2004	Finland	WCH	DNP	—	—	—	—	—	—	—	—
2007	Finland	WC	6	4	2	—	374	12	1	1.93	.913
2012	Finland	WC	4	2	2	—	232	11	1	2.85	.894
2014	Finland	OG	2	1	1	—	119	3	0	1.51	.935
Junior totals			23	16	5	2	1323	38	6	1.72	—
Senior totals			12	7	5	—	725	26	2	2.15	.909

== Awards and honours ==
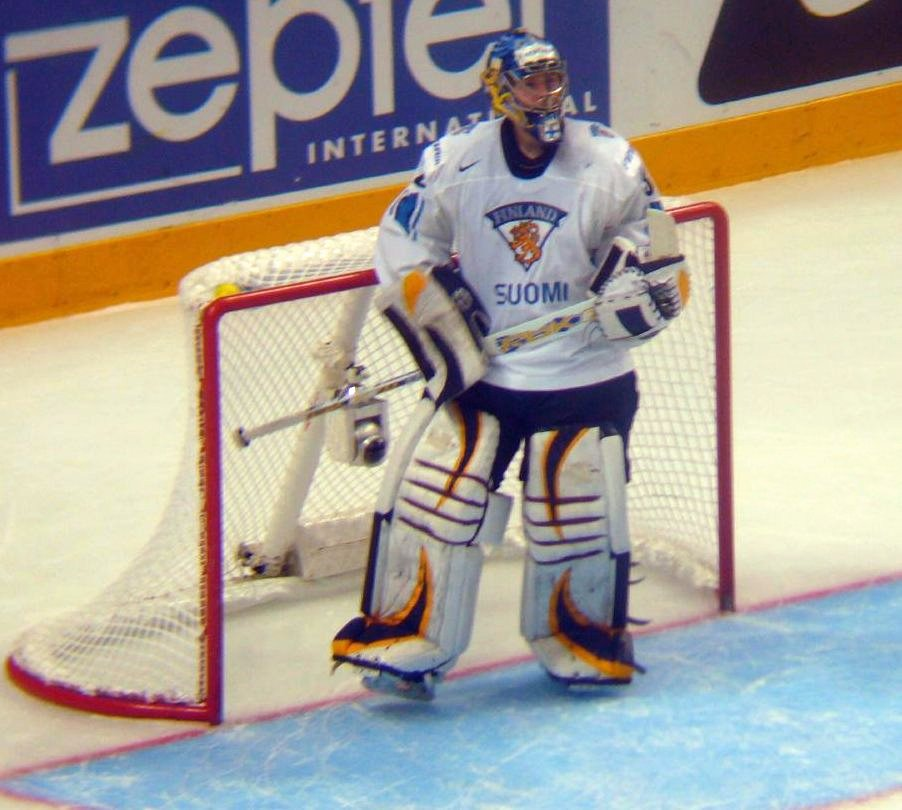
- Lehtonen at the 2007 IIHF World Championship

Medal record

Men's ice hockey

Representing Finland

Olympic Games
Bronze medal – third place	2014 Sochi	

World Championships
Silver medal – second place	2007 Russia	

World Cup
Silver medal – second place	2004 World Cup of Hockey	

World Junior Championships
Silver medal – second place	2001 Russia	
Bronze medal – third place	2002 Czech Republic	
Bronze medal – third place	2003 Canada	

IIHF World U18 Championship
Gold medal – first place	2000 Switzerland	
Silver medal – second place	2001 Finland	

- Urpo Ylönen trophy for best SM-liiga goaltender — 2002 and 2003
- Jari Kurri trophy for best player during the playoffs — 2002
- SM-liiga champion 2002
- 2004 World Cup of Hockey (runner-up)
- Silver Medal in the 2007 IIHF World Championship
- Best Goaltender in the 2007 IIHF World Championship
- Bronze Medal in the 2014 Winter Olympics

== Records ==
- Atlanta Thrashers franchise leader for games played by a goaltender (204).
- Atlanta Thrashers franchise leader for victories (94).
- Atlanta Thrashers franchise leader shutouts (14).
- Atlanta Thrashers franchise leader for games played by a goaltender in a single season (68).
- Atlanta Thrashers franchise leader for saves in a single season (1,892).
- Atlanta Thrashers franchise leader for shutouts in a single season (4).
- Atlanta Thrashers franchise leader for starts in a single season (66).
- Atlanta Thrashers franchise leader for minutes played in a single season (3,934).
- Dallas Stars franchise leader for points in a season as a goaltender (6).
- Dallas Stars franchise leader for most career points as a goaltender (23).
- Dallas Stars franchise leader for assists as a goaltender (28).
- Dallas Stars franchise leader for most saves as a goaltender (11,455).

== Mask history ==
- While playing for the AHL's Chicago Wolves, the Hamburglar was featured on Lehtonen's mask, an homage to the nickname he received shortly after arriving from Finland and becoming enamoured with McDonald's hamburgers.
- He had a depiction of rapper Lil Jon, who is an avid Thrashers fan, on his mask.
- In the past, Lehtonen has worn helmets featuring characters Yuna and Rikku from the video game Final Fantasy X-2, as well as Uma Thurman and Lucy Liu's characters from Kill Bill. Lehtonen, however, is not a video game fanatic; "I've never played it, but I saw a couple of commercials about the game and just thought it looked awesome."
- He also had a mask made featuring Optimus Prime from Transformers, which was never worn in a game, only in pre-game warm ups.
- He also wore a mask that showed a depiction of Heath Ledger's Joker character from The Dark Knight, with a stylized ATL featured on the other side.
- His first mask for the Dallas Stars depicted Clint Eastwood's character from the movie The Good, The Bad, and The Ugly.
- His second mask for the Stars featured Chuck Norris.
- His former mask for Dallas Stars featured characters and scenes from the movie Tombstone.
- For the 2013-14 NHL season, his mask was designed by former teammate Joni Hallikainen. The mask includes longhorns morphing into two points of the star, as well as some car tire marks as Lehtonen is a car enthusiast.
- For the 2014 Winter Olympics, his mask featured the word "Suomi" on both sides of the mask and incorporated a couple of snowflakes.

Awards and achievements
Preceded by Jussi Markkanen	Winner of the Urpo Ylönen trophy 2001–02 & 2002–03	Succeeded by Niklas Bäckström
Preceded by Jussi Tarvainen	Winner of the Jari Kurri trophy 2001–02	Succeeded by Esa Pirnes
Preceded by Timo Jutila	Winner of the Kalen Kannu; 2001–02	Succeeded by Esa Pirnes
Preceded by Ilya Kovalchuk	Atlanta Thrashers first-round draft pick 2002	Succeeded by Jim Slater
