= Timo Jutila =

Finnish ice hockey player (born 1963)

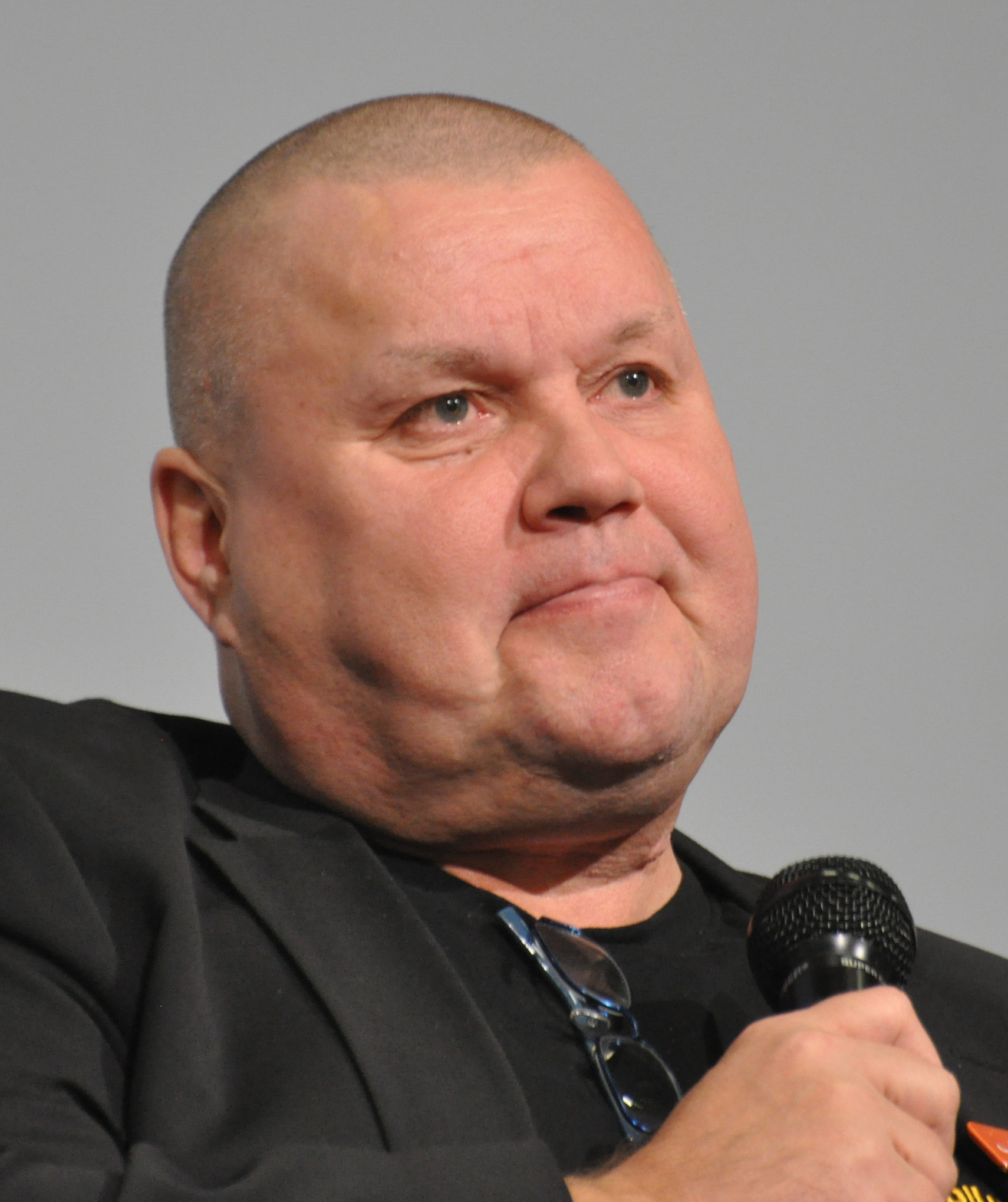
- Born: 24 December 1963 (age 62) Tampere, Finland
- Height: 5 ft 9 in (175 cm)
- Weight: 216 lb (98 kg; 15 st 6 lb)
- Position: Defence
- Shot: Left
- Played for: SM-liiga; Tappara; NHL; Buffalo Sabres; Elitserien; Luleå HF; Nationalliga A SC Bern
- National team: Finland
- NHL draft: 68th overall, 1982; Buffalo Sabres
- Playing career: 1979–1999

Timo Juhani Jutila (born 24 December 1963 in Tampere, Finland) is a retired Finnish ice hockey defenceman. Jutila was drafted by the Buffalo Sabres (4th round, 68th overall) in 1982 NHL entry draft. He played internationally for the Finland men's national ice hockey team and was inducted into the IIHF Hall of Fame in 2003.

== Playing career ==
Jutila's ice hockey career began at the "Pohjola Leiri" 1978 training camp held by the Finnish Ice Hockey Federation where he was selected as the best player of the camp. He played for Tappara in the 1979–80 season of the Finnish SM-liiga. He continued to play with the team for a total of five Seasons (1980–1984), totalling 144 regular season games.

After the 1983–84 season, Jutila went to the NHL and played for the Buffalo Sabres, the team who drafted him in 1982. However, Jutila's NHL career was short-lived and he left NHL in the following season. Jutila played most of the 1984–85 season in AHL for the Rochester Americans, totalling 56 games with 43 points (13 goals and 30 assists).

After his short NHL spell, Jutila returned to Tappara and stayed with the club for three seasons (1985–1988), winning the Finnish Championship every season. After three successful seasons in Finland, Jutila signed with the Swedish team Luleå HF in Elitserien, where he played for four seasons (1988–1992).

Jutila returned to Finland and Tappara in 1993 and continued to play with his former team Tampere for another four seasons (1992–1996). During this period, Tappara was not as successful as in 1985–1988; the best result of Jutila's four-season tenure was a fourth place after losing the bronze medal game in overtime to Lukko in the 1994 playoffs.

In 1996, Jutila was contracted by SC Bern in the Swiss elite league Nationalliga A. After only one season with the club, he returned to Finland, playing his last two seasons as an active hockey player with Tappara. He retired in 1999.

After his retirement, Jutila worked as an ice hockey commentator, and together with Mika Saukkonen and Jari Kurri he formed the play-by-play team for the Finnish ice hockey TV programme Hockey Night, aired on MTV3.

== Personal life ==
Jutila and his first wife Tarja Jutila have three children, one son and two daughters. Jutila's son Eero (b. 1992) has played in the juniors of Tappara and KooVee. In 2009, Jutila entered into his second marriage and lived with his wife Maria in Vantaa. Timo and Maria Jutila divorced in the summer of 2013. In December 2014, Jutila married Satu Mikkola. He resides in Klaukkala, Nurmijärvi, as of 2024.

Jutila's brother Markku Jutila (b. 1966) is also a former ice hockey player.

== Awards ==
- Named Best player of Pohjola Leiri in 1978.
- Awarded the Pekka Rautakallio trophy in 1988.
- Won the Finnish Champion (Kanada-malja) in 1981–82, 1983–84, 1985–86, 1986–87, 1987–88.
- Awarded the President's trophy in 1995.
- Awarded the WC All-Star Team in 1992, 1994, 1995
- Won the Nationalliga A. Champion in 1996–97.
- Awarded Kalen Kannu in 2001.
- Member of the IIHF Hall of Fame

== International career ==
Jutila was a defenceman and the long time captain for the Finnish national team. He played in total 246 international games, scoring 108 points (40 goals and 68 assists). He played eight World Championships (1987, 1991, 1992, 1993, 1994, 1995, 1996 and 1997), three Winter Olympic tournaments (1984, 1992 and 1994) and one Canada Cup (1991).

== Career statistics ==
=== Regular season and playoffs ===
			Regular season					Playoffs
Season	Team	League	GP	G	A	Pts	PIM	GP	G	A	Pts	PIM
1979–80	Tappara	FIN U20	26	7	15	22	38	—	—	—	—	—
1980–81	Tappara	SM-l	36	9	12	21	44	8	3	2	5	6
1981–82	Tappara	SM-l	36	8	11	19	41	11	0	0	0	16
1982–83	Tappara	SM-l	36	8	14	22	46	8	1	3	4	24
1983–84	Tappara	SM-l	37	5	22	27	57	9	0	5	5	18
1984–85	Buffalo Sabres	NHL	10	1	5	6	13	—	—	—	—	—
1984–85	Rochester Americans	AHL	56	13	30	43	26	5	2	5	7	2
1985–86	Tappara	SM-l	30	6	11	17	14	8	3	6	9	2
1986–87	Tappara	SM-l	44	10	28	38	60	9	1	5	6	18
1987–88	Tappara	SM-l	44	12	34	46	50	10	6	6	12	16
1988–89	Luleå HF	SEL	35	7	19	26	42	3	0	0	0	2
1989–90	Luleå HF	SEL	36	6	23	29	42	5	1	2	3	0
1990–91	Luleå HF	SEL	40	8	25	33	55	5	0	2	2	8
1991–92	Luleå HF	SEL	40	11	26	37	48	2	1	0	1	4
1992–93	Tappara	SM-l	47	10	33	43	54	—	—	—	—	—
1993–94	Tappara	SM-l	48	13	36	49	30	10	2	5	7	12
1994–95	Tappara	SM-l	50	11	30	41	66	—	—	—	—	—
1995–96	Tappara	SM-l	49	14	37	51	62	4	0	0	0	6
1996–97	SC Bern	NDA	29	8	20	28	26	2	0	0	0	2
1997–98	Tappara	SM-l	48	7	20	27	77	4	1	1	2	2
1998–99	Tappara	SM-l	48	9	18	27	50	—	—	—	—	—
SM-l totals			561	124	311	435	659	81	17	33	50	120
NHL totals			10	1	5	6	13	—	—	—	—	—
SEL totals			151	32	93	125	187	15	2	4	6	14

=== International ===
Medal record

Men's ice hockey

Representing Finland

Olympic Games
Bronze medal – third place	1994 Lillehammer	Ice hockey

Canada Cup
Bronze medal – third place	1991 Hamilton	Ice hockey

World Championships
Silver medal – second place	1992 Czechoslovakia	Ice hockey
Silver medal – second place	1994 Italy	Ice hockey
Gold medal – first place	1995 Sweden	Ice hockey

World Junior Championships
Silver medal – second place	1981 West Germany	Ice hockey
Bronze medal – third place	1982 United States	Ice hockey

Year	Team	Event	GP	G	A	Pts	PIM
1980	Finland	EJC	5	0	2	2	8
1981	Finland	WJC	5	1	0	1	2
1981	Finland	EJC	5	1	4	5	12
1982	Finland	WJC	7	1	6	7	14
1983	Finland	WJC	7	1	1	2	14
1984	Finland	OLY	5	0	0	0	8
1987	Finland	WC	9	1	3	4	4
1987	Finland	CC	5	1	0	1	6
1991	Finland	WC	10	0	1	1	14
1991	Finland	CC	6	0	0	0	2
1992	Finland	OLY	8	2	2	4	2
1992	Finland	WC	8	2	5	7	10
1993	Finland	WC	6	1	2	3	8
1994	Finland	OLY	8	1	2	3	6
1994	Finland	WC	8	3	4	7	6
1995	Finland	WC	8	5	2	7	10
1996	Finland	WC	6	0	1	1	4
1997	Finland	WC	8	1	3	4	6
Junior totals			29	4	13	17	50
Senior totals			95	17	25	42	86

Preceded by Hannu Virta	Winner of the Pekka Rautakallio trophy 1987–88	Succeeded by Hannu Virta

Preceded by Jari Kurri	Winner of the President's trophy 1994–95	Succeeded by Hannu Virta

Preceded by Timo Tuomi	Winner of the Kalen Kannu; 2000–01	Succeeded by Kari Lehtonen
Preceded by Pekka Laksola	Captain of Tappara; 1992–1996	Succeeded by Harri Laurila
Preceded by Valeri Krykov	Captain of Tappara; 1997–1999	Succeeded by Pasi Petriläinen
