= Pass (ice hockey) =

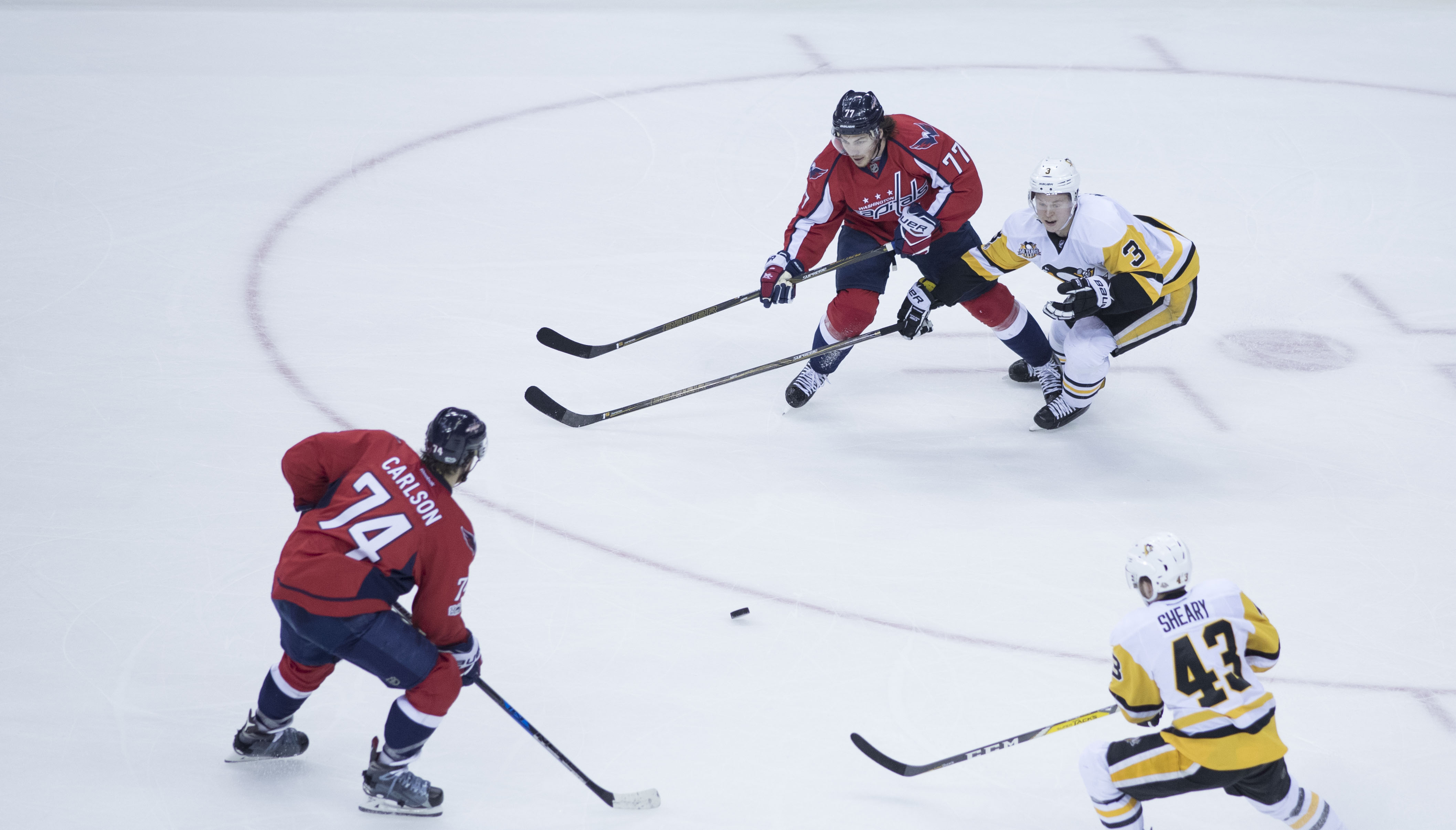
T. J. Oshie of the Washington Capitals (top, 77) makes a pass to his teammate John Carlson (bottom left, 74)

In ice hockey, a pass is the movement of the puck from one player to another, usually by a motion of the stick. A pass differs from a shot, in that a pass is typically weaker than a shot and is not directed at the opponent's net with the intention of scoring a goal. The function of passing in ice hockey during gameplay strongly resembles the role of passing in other goal sports such as soccer and lacrosse. Passing (along with skating, shooting, and stick handling) is one of the most fundamental skills in hockey. An effective pass is described as being "stick to stick" or "tape to tape", referring to the tape on the blade of a hockey stick. Effective passing requires good vision, anticipation, and timing, as well as execution. A player that is an effective passer will normally record many assists, which are awarded to the second and third to last player to touch the puck before a goal. The National Hockey League record for most career assists is 1,963 by Wayne Gretzky, who is considered one of the best passers of all time. Different types of passes are employed in different situations or using different techniques:

Backhand pass
using the back side of the blade of the stick.
Centering pass
to the put the puck into the centre of the ice (the "slot"). This is the most dangerous pass in hockey both because it provides the best opportunity to score and because if the intended receiver misses it, there is a strong likelihood that the puck will come to an opponent with few obstacles to the net.
Clear-out or clearing pass
a pass out of a team's defensive zone. Its primary purpose is defensive, to prevent the opposition from getting the puck for the opportunity to score.
Cross-ice pass
a pass that traverses the width of the ice surface (e.g. from the left winger to the right winger).
Drop pass
when a player passes the puck directly behind him to a teammate. If executed properly, the puck stops moving and the pass's receiver catches up to it.
Hand pass
a pass made with the hand. It is legal when both passer and recipient are inside the defending zone, otherwise illegal. An illegal hand pass results in a stoppage of play and a faceoff at the position where the puck was passed from.
Headmaning the puck
(a.k.a. a stretch pass, an outlet pass, or a long bomb) a long pass that allows one's team to move out of their defensive zone and start a rush. An especially long and well executed one that results in a breakaway is then called a breakaway pass.
No-look pass
made while not looking at the receiver.
Offside pass
a pass to a player who is offside. This can mean a two-line pass(no longer current in the NHL since 2005), a pass that crosses two lines marked on the ice for such purposes. Depending on the era and league, the centre red line may or may not count as such a line. Or, it can refer to a pass to a player who has entered the offensive zone before the puck. This type of pass is always offside no matter how many lines it crosses.
Saucer pass
an airborne pass from one player to another. It is called a saucer pass because the puck resembles a flying saucer in mid-air.
Slap pass
a hard shot aimed at a teammate's stick. It is a shot that is intentionally aimed away from the net to an open teammate's stick.
Suicide pass
a pass that forces the receiver to look down or away from the play in order to find the puck, leaving him vulnerable to a powerful body check.
Tic-tac-toe
a play that involves two quick passes and a shot and results in a goal.
