= Kalen Kannu =

Ice hockey award

Kalen Kannu is a special Award given by the Chairman of the Finnish Ice Hockey Federation: Kalervo Kummola

== Recipients ==
Winners:

- 1998-1999 Jouko Lukkarila
- 1999-2000 Timo Tuomi
- 2000-2001 Timo Jutila
- 2001-2002 Kari Lehtonen
- 2002-2003 Esa Pirnes
- 2003-2004 Tampereen Ilves C-Junior team
- 2004-2005 Heikki Seppälä
- 2005-2006 Mika Toivola
- 2006-2007 Kajaanin Hokki
- 2007-2008 Eero Lehti
- 2008-2009 Toni Rajala
- 2009-2010 Sami Vatanen
- 2010-2011 Jukka Jalonen
- 2011-2012 Prize not awarded
- 2012-2013 Karri Kivi
- 2013-2014 Erkka Westerlund
- 2014-2015 Veini Vehviläinen
- 2015-2016 Jussi Ahokas
- 2016-2017 Juha Junno
- 2017-2018 JYP
- 2018-2019 Jukka Jalonen
- 2019–2020 Jussi Ahokas
- 2020–2021 Raimo Helminen
- 2021–2022 Juuso Hietanen
- 2022–2023 Petri Kontiola
- 2023–2024 Marko Jantunen
