= President's trophy (Finland) =

President's Trophy is a Finnish ice hockey award given by the Honorary Chairman of the Finnish Ice Hockey Association, Kai Hietaranta, to a person who has made an impressive impact on ice hockey in Finland.

== Winners ==
- 1993–94 – Jari Kurri
- 1994–95 – Timo Jutila
- 1995–96 – Hannu Virta
- 1996–97 – Jarmo Myllys
- 1997–98 – Teemu Selänne
- 1998–99 – Saku Koivu
- 1999–00 – Esa Tikkanen
- 2000–01 – Raimo Helminen
- 2001–02 – Janne Ojanen
- 2002–03 – not awarded
- 2003–04 – Päivi Halonen
- 2004–05 – Ville Peltonen
- 2005–06 – Erkka Westerlund
- 2006–07 – not awarded
- 2007–08 – not awarded
- 2008–09 – Sami Kapanen
- 2009–10 – Janne Ojanen
- 2010–11 – Mikael Granlund
- 2011–12 – Mikko Koivu
- 2012–13 – Antti Raanta
- 2013–14 – Teuvo Teräväinen
- 2014–15 – Ville Nieminen
- 2015–16 – Jesse Puljujärvi
- 2016–17 – Patrik Laine
- 2017–18 – Riikka Sallinen
- 2018–19 – Kaapo Kakko
- 2019–20 – not awarded
- 2020–21 – not awarded
- 2021–22 – Valtteri Filppula
