= Camil Gélinas Trophy =

The Camil Gélinas Trophy (French: Trophée Camil Gélinas) has been awarded to the top coach in the Ligue Magnus since 2002. It is named after Camil Gélinas, a Canadian who played and coached in France for many years.

== Winners ==
Year	Coach	Team
2025/26	Pierre Bergeron	Diables Rouges de Briançon
2024/25	Jonathan Paredes	Ducs d'Angers
2023/24	Luc Tardif	Spartiates de Marseille
2022/23	Eric Blais	Rapaces de Gap
2021/22	Jonathan Paredes	HC Cergy-Pontoise
2020/21	Fabrice Lhenry	Dragons de Rouen
2019/20	Yorick Treille	Scorpions de Mulhouse
2018/19	Fabrice Lhenry	Dragons de Rouen
2017/18	Mario Richer	Gothiques d’Amiens
2016/17	Edo Terglav	Grenoble Métropole Hockey 38
2015/16	Stéphane Barin	Image Club d’Épinal
2014/15	Luciano Basile	Rapaces de Gap
2013/14	Jarmo Tolvanen	Ducs de Dijon
2012/13	Luciano Basile	Diables Rouges de Briançon
2011/12	Stéphane Gros	Chamonix Hockey Club
2010/11	Patrick Turcotte	Gap Hockey Club
2009/10	Luciano Basile	Diables Rouges de Briançon
2008/09	Luciano Basile	Diables Rouges de Briançon
2007/08	Ari Salo	Mont-Blanc HC
2006/07	Stéphane Gros	Pingouins de Morzine-Avoriaz
2005/06	Daniel Maric	Ducs de Dijon
2004/05	Robert Millette	ASG Tours
2003/04	Antoine Richer	Gothiques d'Amiens
2002/03	Dennis Murphy	Ours de Villard-de-Lans
2001/02	Pekka Laksola	Reims Champagne Hockey
