= Pasi Petriläinen =

Finnish ice hockey player

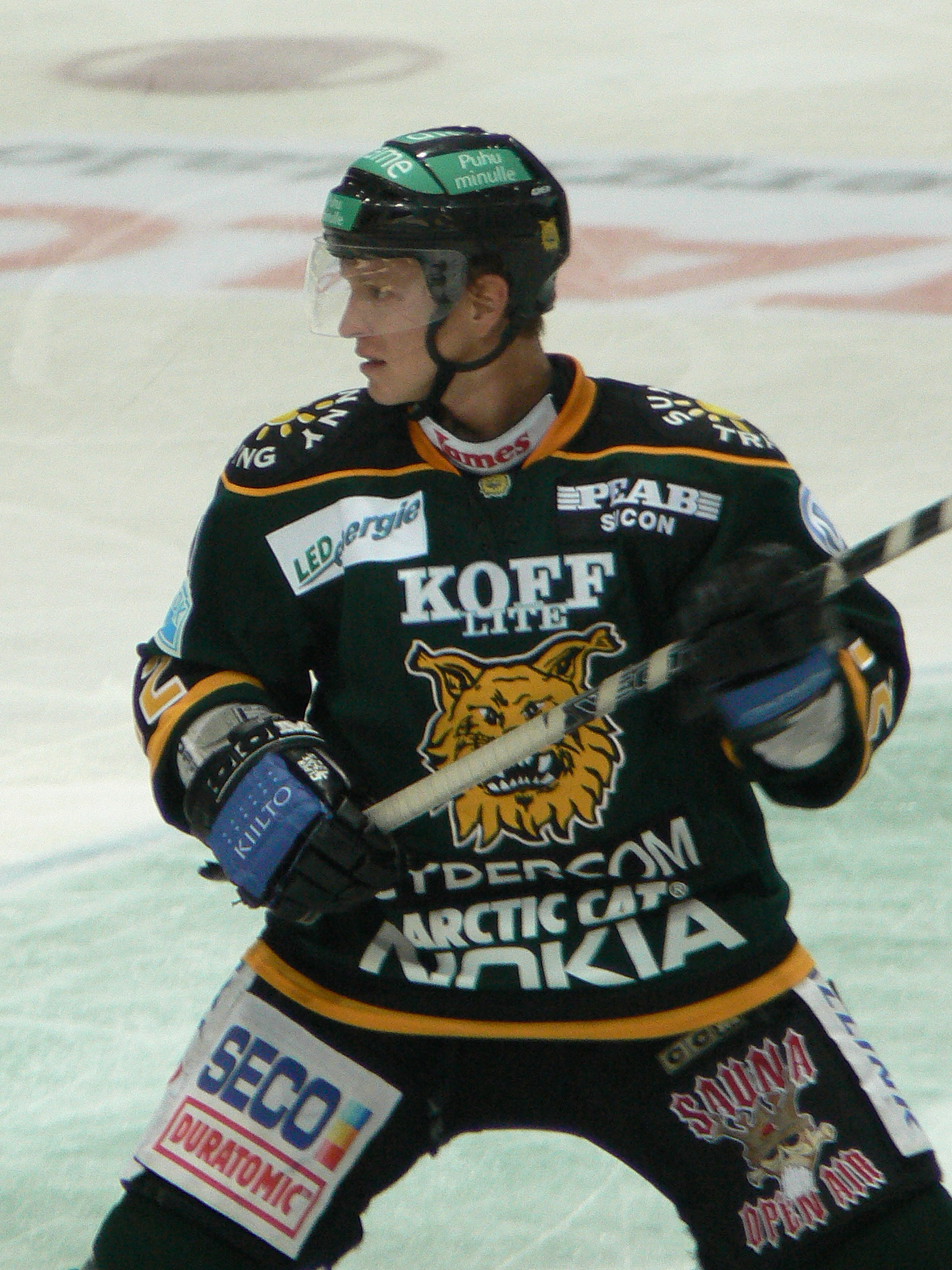
- Born: 5 May 1978 (age 46); Pirkkala, Finland
- Height: 5 ft 9 in (175 cm)
- Weight: 187 lb (85 kg; 13 st 5 lb)
- Position: Defence
- Shot: Left
- Played for: Tappara; Timrå IK; TPS; Skellefteå AIK; Södertälje SK; Ilves; HDD Olimpija Ljubljana; IF Björklöven; Lempäälän Kisa; Étoile Noire de Strasbourg
- NHL draft: 225th overall, 1996; New Jersey Devils
- Playing career: 1994–2012

Pasi Petriläinen (born 5 May 1978) is a Finnish former professional ice hockey defenceman.

== Playing career ==
A New Jersey Devils draft pick (225th overall in 1996), Petriläinen spent six seasons with Tappara between 1994 and 2000 before moving to Sweden to play for Timrå IK in the Elitserien for one season. He returned to SM-liiga in 2002 playing for TPS for two seasons. He then returned to Tappara in 2003 for one season. He went back to Sweden in 2004, joining second division side Skellefteå AIK before returning to Elitserien with Södertälje SK in an unsuccessful season which saw the team relegated to the second division. He returned to Finland and joined Ilves. In 2007, he signed with Olimpija Ljubljana. He signed with the Étoile Noire de Strasbourg (literally Black Star) for the 2010–2011 season.

== Career statistics ==
			Regular season					Playoffs
Season	Team	League	GP	G	A	Pts	PIM	GP	G	A	Pts	PIM
1992–93	Tappara U16	Jr. C SM-sarja	1	0	0	0	2	—	—	—	—	—
1993–94	Tappara U16	Jr. C SM-sarja	30	6	20	26	36	7	2	4	6	4
1994–95	Tappara U18	Jr. B SM-sarja	7	3	4	7	8	7	1	3	4	2
1994–95	Tappara U20	Jr. A I-Divisioona	11	3	4	7	6	—	—	—	—	—
1994–95	Tappara	Liiga	25	3	0	3	14	—	—	—	—	—
1995–96	Tappara U18	Jr. B SM-sarja	1	2	0	2	0	1	1	1	2	2
1995–96	Tappara U20	Jr. A I-Divisioona	2	0	2	2	2	—	—	—	—	—
1995–96	Tappara	Liiga	40	0	4	4	18	4	0	0	0	2
1996–97	Tappara	Liiga	43	2	9	11	46	3	0	0	0	2
1997–98	Tappara U20	Jr. A SM-liiga	1	0	1	1	10	—	—	—	—	—
1997–98	Tappara	Liiga	48	4	7	11	34	4	0	0	0	4
1998–99	Tappara	Liiga	35	3	3	6	26	—	—	—	—	—
1999–00	Tappara	Liiga	39	1	9	10	22	4	0	1	1	0
2000–01	Timrå IK	SHL	49	3	10	13	22	—	—	—	—	—
2001–02	HC TPS	Liiga	56	1	8	9	32	8	0	0	0	4
2002–03	HC TPS	Liiga	56	6	12	18	26	7	0	0	0	2
2003–04	Tappara	Liiga	47	3	13	16	51	3	0	0	0	0
2004–05	Skellefteå AIK	Allsvenskan	27	0	7	7	14	10	0	1	1	12
2005–06	Södertälje SK	SHL	32	0	3	3	59	—	—	—	—	—
2006–07	Ilves	Liiga	45	2	7	9	58	7	0	0	0	6
2007–08	HDD Olimpija Ljubljana	EBEL	17	3	5	8	28	14	2	0	2	20
2007–08	HDD Olimpija Ljubljana	Slovenia	—	—	—	—	—	4	0	0	0	8
2008–09	HDD Olimpija Ljubljana	EBEL	49	2	2	4	64	—	—	—	—	—
2008–09	IF Björklöven	Allsvenskan	6	0	0	0	10	—	—	—	—	—
2009–10	Lempäälän Kisa	Mestis	3	0	1	1	0	—	—	—	—	—
2009–10	Ilves	Liiga	4	0	0	0	6	—	—	—	—	—
2010–11	Étoile Noire de Strasbourg	France	25	2	5	7	55	13	1	2	3	32
2011–12	Étoile Noire de Strasbourg	France	15	2	2	4	16	—	—	—	—	—
Liiga totals			438	25	72	97	333	40	0	1	1	20

Preceded by Timo Jutila	Captain of Tappara; 1999–2000	Succeeded by Janne Ojanen
