= Hannu Virta =

Finnish ice hockey player

- Born: 22 March 1963 (age 63) Turku, Finland
- Height: 6 ft 0 in (183 cm)
- Weight: 180 lb (82 kg; 12 st 12 lb)
- Position: Defence
- Shot: Left
- Played for: SM-liiga; TPS; NHL; Buffalo Sabres; Nationalliga A ZSC Lions; Nationalliga B Grasshopper Zürich
- National team: Finland
- NHL draft: 38th overall, 1981; Buffalo Sabres
- Playing career: 1981–1998

Medal record

Representing Finland

Men's ice hockey

World Junior Championships
Bronze medal – third place	1982 Canada & USA	

World Championships
Gold medal – first place	1995 Sweden	
Silver medal – second place	1994 Italy	

Olympic Games
Bronze medal – third place	1994 Lillehammer	

Hannu Markus Virta (born 22 March 1963) is a retired Finnish professional ice hockey defenceman. He was named the best defenceman in the Finnish Elite League (SM-liiga) four times, and was a five-time all-star. He also won the Jarmo Wasama memorial trophy as rookie of the year in 1981–82.

== Career ==
Virta was drafted in the second round, 38th overall, by the Buffalo Sabres in the 1981 NHL Entry Draft. He played 245 National Hockey League games with the Sabres over five seasons, scoring 25 goals and adding 101 assists. He also appeared in 17 playoff games with Buffalo, scoring one goal and tallying three assists.

He returned to the SM-liiga in Finland in 1986, where he played for TPS Turku until 1994, as well as in 1996–97. He helped his team win the league championship three consecutive years beginning in 1988–89. In 461 league games, he scored 68 goals and 213 assists for 281 points. He also played in Switzerland, in the Swiss B League with the GCK Lions from 1994 to 1996 and in the Swiss A League with the ZSC Lions in 1997–98.

Internationally, Virta won a bronze medal at the Under-20 World Junior Championships in 1982. As an adult, he won a bronze medal at the 1994 Winter Olympics playing for Finland's national ice hockey team. He played at seven IIHF World Championships, winning gold in 1995 and silver in 1994, and leading the tournament in assists in 1996. He also played in the 1987 Canada Cup and 1996 World Cup of Hockey.

Virta's number 23 was retired by TPS Turku.

== Coaching career ==
He coached in the SM-liiga with the Espoo Blues from 2003 to 2004, and as of 2008, he coaches for his old team TPS., on 12 January 2009 signs a contract as Head Coach from Hockey Club Lugano.

== Career statistics ==
=== Regular season and playoffs ===
			Regular season					Playoffs
Season	Team	League	GP	G	A	Pts	PIM	GP	G	A	Pts	PIM
1978–79	TPS	FIN U18	22	1	9	10	6	—	—	—	—	—
1979–80	TPS	FIN U20	26	13	8	21	6	5	2	3	5	0
1980–81	TPS	FIN U20	29	22	22	44	55	—	—	—	—	—
1980–81	TPS	SM-l	1	0	1	1	0	4	0	1	1	4
1981–82	TPS	SM-l	36	5	12	17	6	7	1	1	2	2
1981–82	Buffalo Sabres	NHL	3	0	1	1	4	4	0	1	1	0
1982–83	Buffalo Sabres	NHL	74	13	24	37	18	10	1	2	3	4
1983–84	Buffalo Sabres	NHL	70	6	30	36	12	3	0	0	0	2
1984–85	Buffalo Sabres	NHL	51	1	23	24	16	—	—	—	—	—
1985–86	Buffalo Sabres	NHL	47	5	23	28	16	—	—	—	—	—
1986–87	TPS	SM-l	41	13	30	43	20	5	0	3	3	2
1987–88	TPS	SM-l	44	10	28	38	20	—	—	—	—	—
1988–89	TPS	SM-l	43	7	25	32	30	10	1	7	8	0
1989–90	TPS	SM-l	41	7	19	26	14	9	0	6	6	10
1990–91	TPS	SM-l	43	4	16	20	40	9	4	2	6	4
1991–92	TPS	SM-l	43	6	22	28	32	3	1	4	5	0
1992–93	TPS	SM-l	39	1	18	19	18	12	2	2	4	14
1993–94	TPS	SM-l	47	3	17	20	18	10	0	3	3	6
1994–95	GCK Lions	CHE.2	36	12	18	30	14	12	5	9	14	2
1995–96	GCK Lions	CHE.2	35	12	26	38	10	10	1	6	7	6
1996–97	TPS	SM-l	48	7	14	21	24	12	0	1	1	6
1997–98	ZSC Lions	NDA	46	4	25	29	14	—	—	—	—	—
SM-l totals			426	63	202	265	222	81	9	30	39	48
NHL totals			245	25	101	126	66	17	1	3	4	6

=== International ===
Year	Team	Event	GP	G	A	Pts	PIM
1981	Finland	EJC	5	3	1	4	0
1982	Finland	WJC	7	1	7	8	4
1987	Finland	WC	8	0	4	4	4
1987	Finland	CC	5	0	1	1	0
1989	Finland	WC	10	3	5	8	6
1991	Finland	WC	7	0	2	2	4
1994	Finland	OLY	8	2	1	3	2
1994	Finland	WC	8	1	4	5	6
1995	Finland	WC	7	1	1	2	8
1996	Finland	WC	6	0	6	6	4
1996	Finland	WCH	4	1	0	1	6
1997	Finland	WC	8	0	3	3	4
Junior totals			12	4	8	12	4
Senior totals			71	8	27	35	44

Preceded by Pekka Rautakallio	Winner of the Pekka Rautakallio trophy 1986–87	Succeeded by Timo Jutila

Preceded by Timo Jutila	Winner of the Pekka Rautakallio trophy 1988–89, 1989–90, 1990–91	Succeeded by Harri Laurila

Preceded by Timo Jutila	Winner of the President's trophy 1995–96	Succeeded by Jarmo Myllys
Preceded by Ted Sator	Head Coach of Blues; 2003–2004	Succeeded by Pekka Rautakallio
Preceded by Hannu Jortikka	Head Coach of TPS; 2007—	Succeeded by —
