= Janne Ojanen =

Finnish ice hockey player (born 1968)

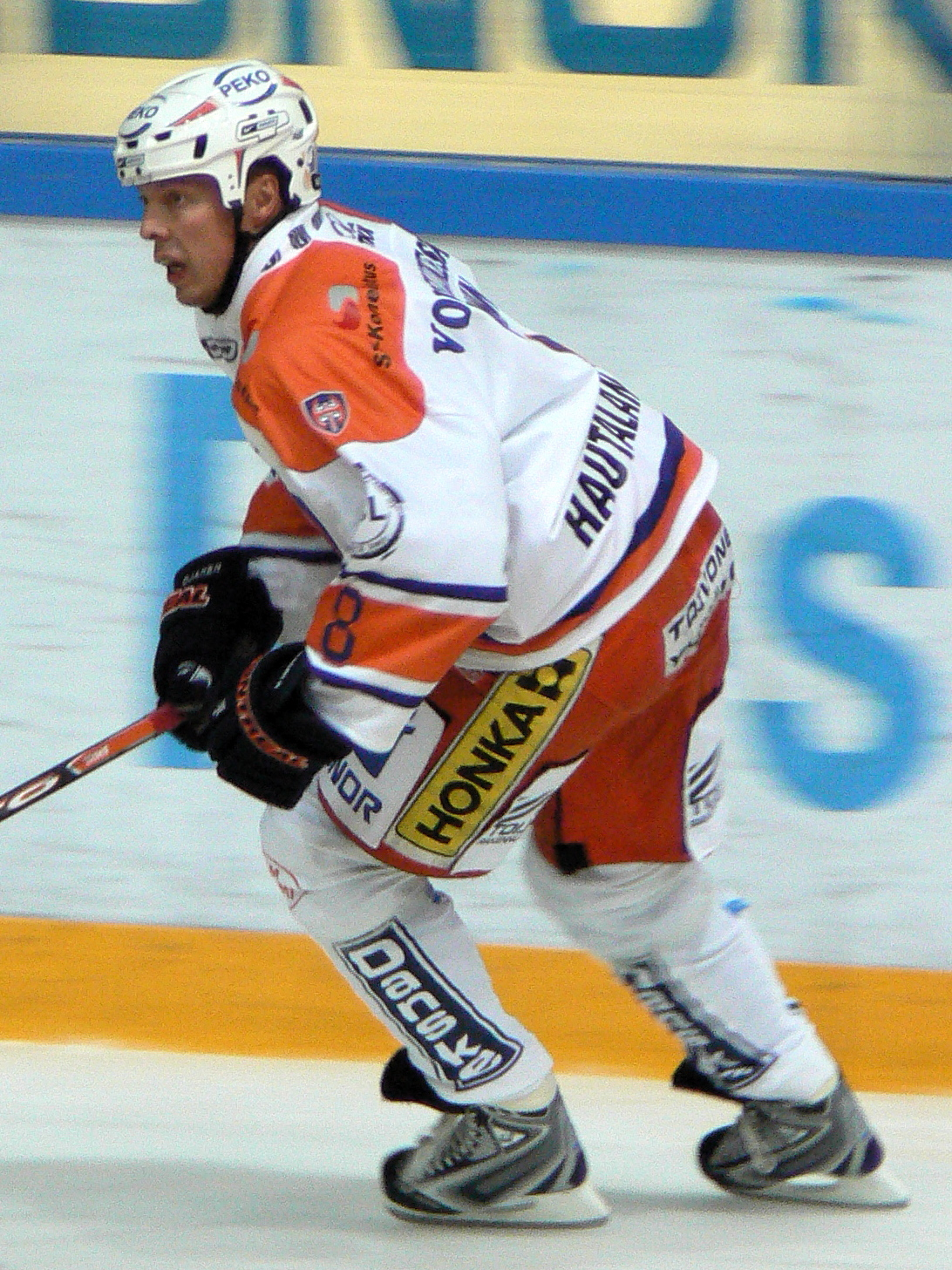
- Born: 9 April 1968 (age 58) Tampere, Finland
- Height: 6 ft 2 in (188 cm)
- Weight: 200 lb (91 kg; 14 st 4 lb)
- Position: Centre
- Shot: Left
- Played for: Tappara; New Jersey Devils; HC Lugano; Malmö IF
- National team: Finland
- NHL draft: 45th overall, 1986; New Jersey Devils
- Playing career: 1985–2010

Janne Juhani Ojanen (born 9 April 1968) is a Finnish former professional ice hockey player. He is the all-time leading scorer in Finland's SM-liiga with 799 points, spending the majority of his playing career with Tappara.

== Playing career ==
=== Early Career in Finland ===
Ojanen started his playing career playing for his hometown team Tappara. Ojanen played 3 SM-liiga games on his first season. Two years earlier Ojanen was selected as the best player in Pohjola Leiri, an annual youth training camp where the best under-18 players play and are selected to Youth National Team. Ojanen was drafted to NHL the following year by New Jersey Devils. Ojanen played his first adult international tournaments in 1987 as he was selected to Finland's Canada Cup and World Championship teams. Ojanen was part of the 1988 Olympic Team which won Finland's first International tournament medal. Ojanen won the SM-liiga Championship twice in 1987 and 1988 during his early years in Tappara.

=== First Attempt in NHL ===
In 1988, Ojanen was acquired by New Jersey Devils, the team which had drafted Ojanen in 1986. Ojanen's debut season consisted of three games in the NHL and 72 in Devils affiliate team Utica Devils.

During the following season, Ojanen had more games for the Devils and stayed on the roster for the entire season, scoring 30 points in 64 games. After his first full season with the Devils, he decided to return to Finland

=== Brief return to Finland ===
After his two years in North America, Ojanen returned to Finland played two seasons for Tappara. Ojanen also played in the 1991 Canada Cup. During 1991–92 Season Ojanen returned to New Jersey.

=== Second NHL Visit ===
Ojanen made his NHL return in 1991–92 NHL playoffs and played three games for the Devils. Ojanen's fourth NHL season however was not that good. He played 31 games for Devils during the 1992–93 NHL season and seven games for Cincinnati Cyclones, scoring 9 points for Cyclones. After the end of the season Ojanen again went back to Finland.

=== Return to Finland ===
Ojanen returned to Tappara for the 1993–94 SM-liiga season and was in good shape as he was one of the leading players for Tappara. He also had some international glory during his first season back in Europe. Ojanen played in the 1994 Winter Olympics and 1994 World Championships, winning Olympic bronze and World Championships silver.

The colour of his World Championship medal improved as Ojanen was part of the first world championship winning team of Finland, when they beat rival Sweden 4 goals to 1 in the finals and the tournament was played in Sweden. During the 1994–95 season Ojanen played also for Swiss HC Lugano in Nationalliga A playoffs, as Tappara's SM-liga season had ended.

Ojanen played the following season for Tappara and was selected to World Cup and World Championship squads.

=== Visit to Sweden and final return to Finland ===
After three seasons in Tappara, Ojanen was signed by the Swedish Elitserien Malmö IF Redhawks. Ojanen had signed a two-year contract to Malmö and played well in Sweden. During his first season, he was selected to 1997 World Championship team.

After his two-year stay in Sweden, Ojanen made his return to Tappara. Although he was already 30 years old, he still was one of the top Finnish players in SM-liiga and had a big role in Tappara. Ojanen had a consistent form during his seasons and was selected to World Championships for the last time in 2002.

=== Late career ===
Ojanen won his final SM-liiga Championship in 2003 when Tappara won Kärpät in the Finals. Ojanen had acquired the captaincy of Tappara in 2000 and his time as captain has lasted for 8 years. He has announced that he will continue to play one more season 2008–2009. During his time in Tappara, Ojanen has been viewed as the premier player for Tappara like Erik Hämäläinen is for Lukko and Raimo Helminen is for Ilves. Ojanen's has played his entire SM-liiga career in Tappara.

On 28 November 2009 Ojanen became top scorer all-time in SM-liiga, surpassing Arto Javanainen who had held a record for 16 years.

== International career ==
Ojanen played 205 games for Finland, with 50 goals and 74 assists. He played six World Championship tournaments, twice in Canada Cup, once in World Cup and played three times in the Winter Olympics. For several years, Ojanen was the only Finnish player to have won both a World Junior Championship and a Men's World Championships gold medal. In 2011, he was joined by Niko Kapanen and Pasi Puistola.

== Awards, honors and records ==
Awards	Year
Liiga
Finnish Champion (Kanada-malja)	1985-86, 1986-87, 1987-88, 2002-03
Runners-up	2000-01, 2001-02
Bronze Medal	2007-08
Aarne Honkavaara award	2001-02
Veli-Pekka Ketola award	2001-02

== Career statistics ==
=== Regular season and playoffs ===
			Regular season					Playoffs
Season	Team	League	GP	G	A	Pts	PIM	GP	G	A	Pts	PIM
1984–85	Whitby Lawmen	OJHL	15	8	6	14	6	—	—	—	—	—
1985–86	Tappara	FIN U20	14	5	12	17	30	5	2	3	5	8
1985–86	Tappara	SM-l	3	0	0	0	2	—	—	—	—	—
1986–87	Tappara	SM-l	40	18	13	31	16	9	4	6	10	2
1987–88	Tappara	SM-l	44	21	31	52	30	10	4	4	8	12
1988–89	New Jersey Devils	NHL	3	0	1	1	2	—	—	—	—	—
1988–89	Utica Devils	AHL	72	23	37	60	10	5	0	3	3	0
1989–90	New Jersey Devils	NHL	64	17	13	30	12	—	—	—	—	—
1990–91	Tappara	SM-l	44	14	33	47	36	3	1	2	3	6
1991–92	Tappara	SM-l	44	21	27	48	24	—	—	—	—	—
1991–92	New Jersey Devils	NHL	—	—	—	—	—	3	0	2	2	0
1992–93	New Jersey Devils	NHL	31	4	9	13	14	—	—	—	—	—
1992–93	Cincinnati Cyclones	IHL	7	1	8	9	0	—	—	—	—	—
1993–94	Tappara	SM-l	39	22	24	46	24	10	2	9	11	2
1994–95	Tappara	SM-l	50	22	33	55	74	—	—	—	—	—
1994–95	HC Lugano	NDA	—	—	—	—	—	1	0	1	1	0
1995–96	Tappara	SM-l	45	20	44	64	34	4	2	2	4	2
1996–97	Malmö IF	SEL	41	10	29	39	28	4	0	1	1	4
1997–98	Malmö IF	SEL	45	11	22	33	42	—	—	—	—	—
1998–99	Tappara	SM-l	54	14	32	46	30	—	—	—	—	—
1999–2000	Tappara	SM-l	53	18	47	65	54	4	3	7	10	2
2000–01	Tappara	SM-l	54	15	26	41	71	10	2	4	6	33
2001–02	Tappara	SM-l	54	20	41	61	30	10	2	7	9	6
2002–03	Tappara	SM-l	56	12	27	39	16	15	2	5	7	4
2003–04	Tappara	SM-l	43	11	20	31	49	3	1	0	1	0
2004–05	Tappara	SM-l	52	16	13	29	44	8	2	2	4	16
2005–06	Tappara	SM-l	47	7	21	28	36	6	1	0	1	8
2006–07	Tappara	SM-l	56	12	32	44	38	5	0	1	1	2
2007–08	Tappara	SM-l	56	17	35	52	26	11	2	2	4	6
2008–09	Tappara	SM-l	24	2	11	13	18	—	—	—	—	—
2009–10	Tappara	SM-l	18	1	6	7	24	5	0	2	2	4
SM-l totals			876	283	516	799	676	113	28	53	81	105
NHL totals			98	21	23	44	28	3	0	2	2	0

=== International ===
Medal record

Men's ice hockey

Representing Finland

Olympic Games
Silver medal – second place	1988 Calgary	Team
Bronze medal – third place	1994 Lillehammer	Team

World Championships
Silver medal – second place	1994 Italy	Team
Gold medal – first place	1995 Sweden	Team

World Junior Championships
Gold medal – first place	1987 Czechoslovakia	Team
Bronze medal – third place	1988 Soviet Union	Team

Year	Team	Event	GP	G	A	Pts	PIM
1986	Finland	EJC	5	5	7	12	10
1987	Finland	WJC	7	3	9	12	6
1987	Finland	WC	8	3	3	6	9
1987	Finland	CC	5	0	1	1	0
1988	Finland	WJC	7	6	5	11	16
1988	Finland	OLY	8	2	1	3	4
1991	Finland	CC	6	2	2	4	2
1994	Finland	OLY	8	4	2	6	8
1994	Finland	WC	8	2	2	4	6
1995	Finland	WC	8	0	4	4	4
1996	Finland	WC	6	2	0	2	6
1996	Finland	WCH	4	1	1	2	0
1997	Finland	WC	7	2	4	6	6
2002	Finland	WC	9	2	2	4	8
Junior totals			19	14	21	35	32
Senior totals			77	20	22	42	53

Preceded by Risto Kurkinen	Winner of the Jarmo Wasama memorial trophy 1986–87	Succeeded by Mika Nieminen
Preceded by Tony Virta	Winner of the Lasse Oksanen trophy 2001–02	Succeeded by Antti Miettinen
Preceded by Kai Nurminen	Winner of the Veli-Pekka Ketola trophy 2001–02	Succeeded by Jan Caloun
Preceded by Raimo Helminen	Winner of the President's trophy 2001–02	Succeeded by Päivi Halonen
Preceded by Tommi Paakkolanvaara	Winner of the Raimo Kilpiö trophy 2007–08	Succeeded by -
Preceded by Pasi Petriläinen	Captain of Tappara; 2000–2009	Succeeded by Pekka Saravo
