= Pekka Laksola =

Finnish ice hockey coach

- Born: 25 May 1964 (age 60); Tampere, Finland
- Height: 6 ft 0 in (183 cm)
- Weight: 185 lb (84 kg; 13 st 3 lb)
- Position: Defender
- Shot: Left
- SM-liiga team Former teams: Tappara; DEL; Berlin Capitals; Ligue Magnus; HC Reims
- National team: Finland
- Playing career: 1982–2000

Pekka Laksola (born May 25, 1964) is a Finnish ice hockey coach. He played a long career for Tappara of the Finnish SM-liiga and later also for Berlin Capitals in Germany and Hockey Club de Reims in France. He also represented Finland men's national ice hockey team three times in the ice hockey World Championships.

== Honors ==
- Finnish SM-liiga championship: 1984, 1987, 1988, 1989
- French championship: 2000 (player), 2002 (head coach)
- French league All-star team: 2000
- French Coach of the Year Award: 2002
