= Saucer pass =

Ice hockey technique

The saucer pass is an ice hockey technique in which the puck is passed to another player in such a way that it flies in the air like a flying saucer. This makes the pass more difficult to intercept by opposing players but it will still land flat on the ice making it simple to control for the receiving player. The saucer pass is widely used nowadays due to the difficulty of intercepting it. It requires a high degree of skill to perform a saucer pass to a team member while also making it difficult for an opposing player to intercept it. The typical height used for a saucer pass depends on the number of opposing players surrounding the player initiating the pass. If the pass is in front of the goal within a few meters, it usually rises a maximum of 30 centimeters above the ice level. In the case of a "torpedo attack"—a saucer pass covering tens of meters, often starting from the passer's defensive zone—the pass can easily rise over 3 meters from the ice to avoid being captured by an opposing player's glove (capturing a pass with a stick above one's own shoulder level or above goal height is prohibited close to a goal).

The inventor of the saucer pass is commonly credited as the Finnish ice hockey legend Raimo Helminen. According to the book Raipe - vaatimattomuuden lyhyt oppimäärä, he invented the pass when he was playing against grown-up men from his neighborhood when he was a young child in Koivistonkylä, Tampere, Finland.
