= Kaapo Kakko =

Finnish ice hockey player (born 2001)

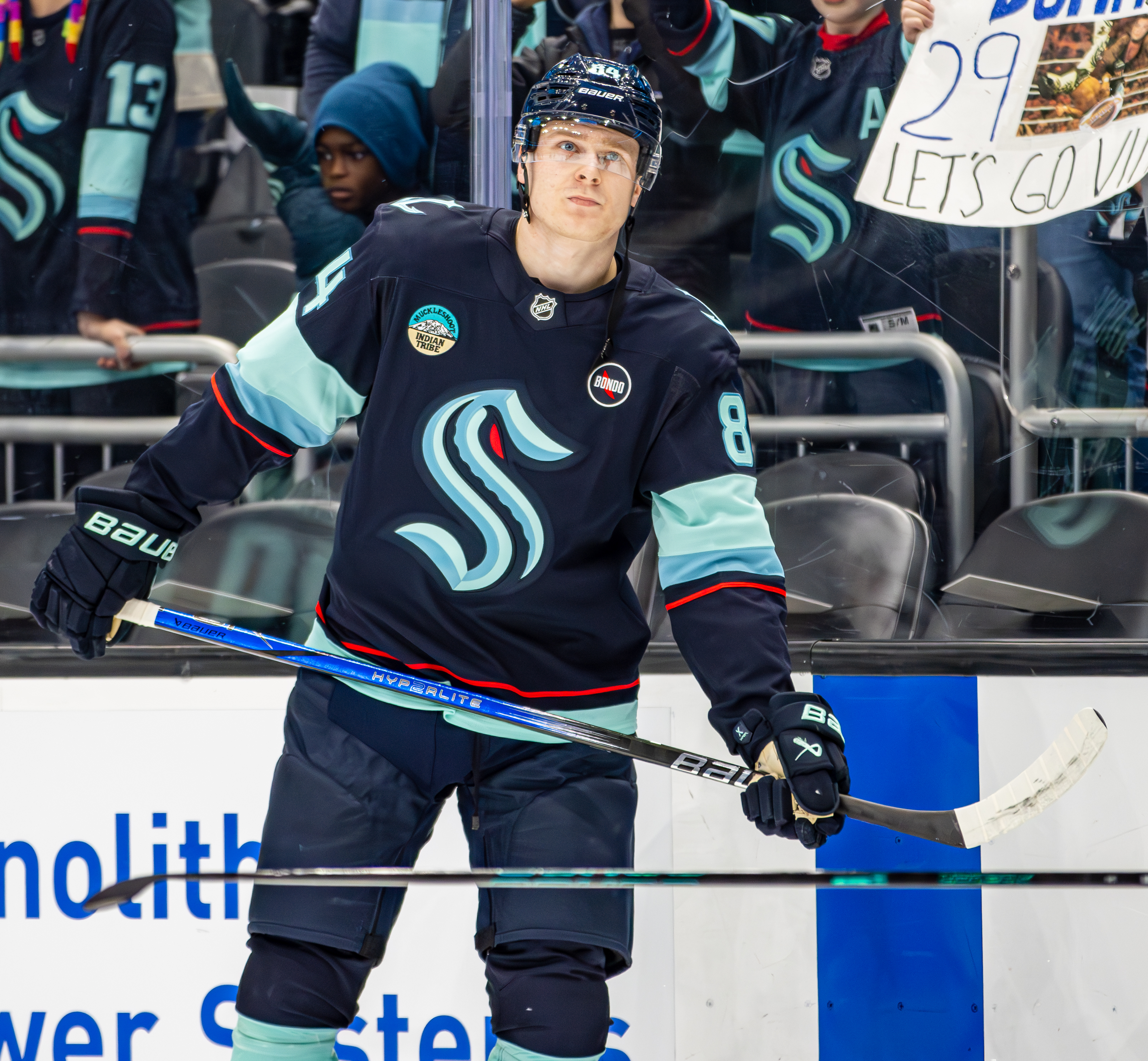
- Kakko with the Seattle Kraken in 2024
- Born: 13 February 2001 (age 25) Turku, Finland
- Height: 6 ft 1 in (185 cm)
- Weight: 215 lb (98 kg; 15 st 5 lb)
- Position: Forward
- Shoots: Left
- NHL team Former teams: Seattle Kraken; TPS; New York Rangers
- National team: Finland
- NHL draft: 2nd overall, 2019; New York Rangers
- Playing career: 2017–present

Kaapo Ville Olavi Kakko (Finnish pronunciation: [ˈkɑːpo ˈkɑkːo]; born 13 February 2001) is a Finnish professional ice hockey player who is a forward for the Seattle Kraken of the National Hockey League (NHL). Kakko was selected second overall by the New York Rangers in the 2019 NHL entry draft, and played the first five and a half years of his NHL career with them. Kakko plays right wing, but also has experience playing at centre. He made his professional debut playing with TPS of the Finnish Liiga.

== Playing career ==
=== New York Rangers ===
On 21 June 2019, as the top-ranked European skater heading into the 2019 NHL entry draft, Kakko was selected second overall by the New York Rangers. On 11 July 2019, he was signed to a three-year, entry-level contract with the Rangers.

Kakko made his NHL debut for the Rangers on 3 October 2019. He scored his first NHL career goal on 12 October, at home against the Edmonton Oilers, becoming the eighth player in Rangers franchise history to score a goal at the age of 18 or younger. He also became the second player in NHL history born in the 21st century to score a goal, after Ville Heinola (also born in 2001) of the Winnipeg Jets, who scored a goal just hours before Kakko on the same day.

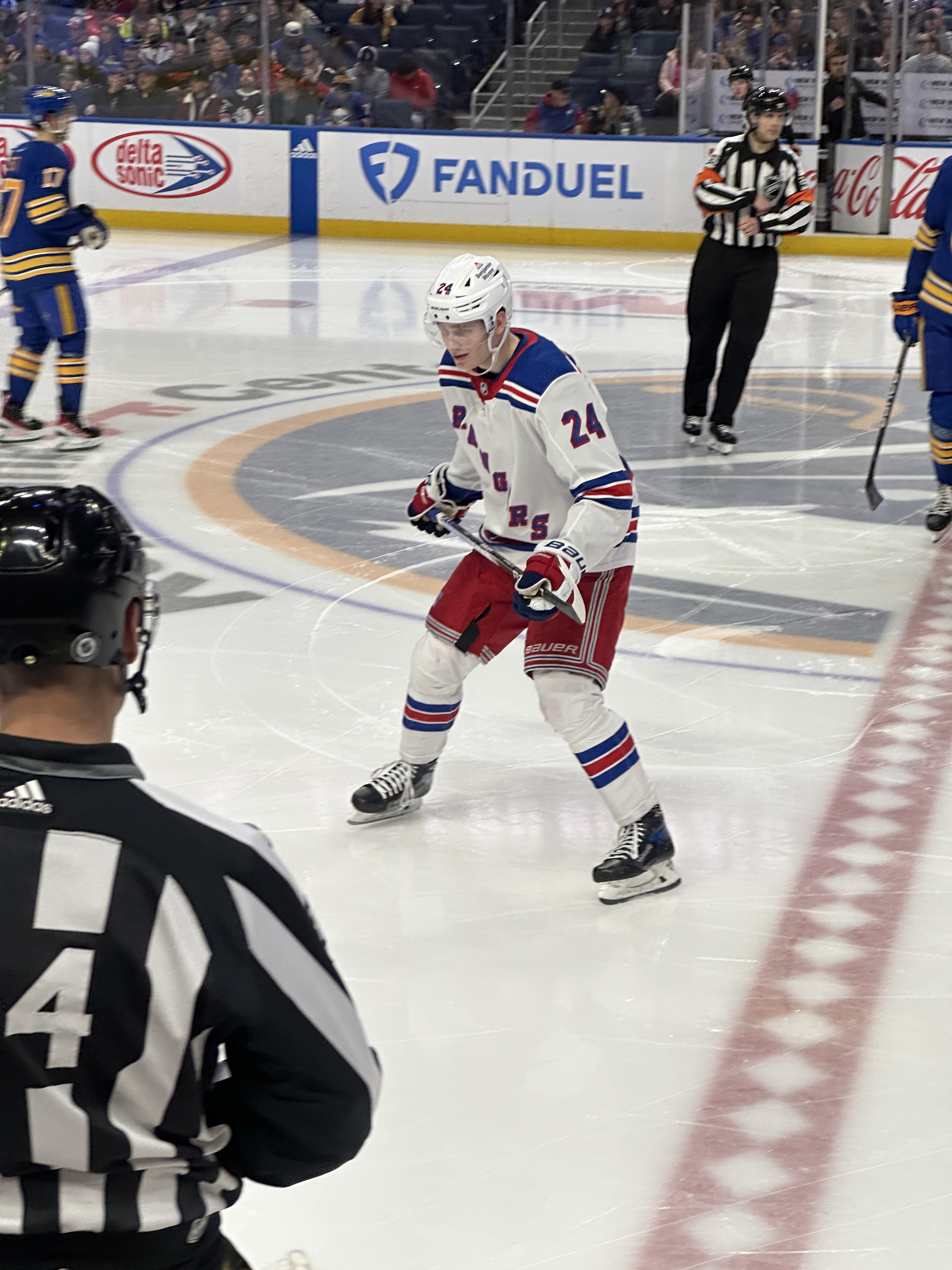
Kakko with the New York Rangers in 2023

Following the conclusion of his entry-level contract with the Rangers, Kakko as a restricted free agent was re-signed to a two-year, $4.2 million contract extension with New York on 28 July 2022.

As a restricted free agent, Kakko signed a one-year, $2.4 million contract extension with New York on 13 June 2024.

=== Seattle Kraken ===
During the 2024–25 season, on 18 December 2024, Kakko was traded by the Rangers to the Seattle Kraken in a deal for Will Borgen and two draft picks in 2025.

On 27 September 2025, Kakko was ruled out for approximately six weeks after breaking his hand during a preseason game.

== International play ==
Medal record

Men's ice hockey

Representing Finland

Olympic Games
| Bronze medal – third place | 2026 Milano Cortina | |

World Championships
| Gold medal – first place | 2019 Slovakia | |

World Junior Championships
| Gold medal – first place | 2019 Canada | |

World U18 Championships
| Gold medal – first place | 2018 Russia | |

Kakko scored the gold medal-winning goal for Finland junior team in the 2019 World Junior Championships on 5 January 2019. Kakko is the youngest player in ice hockey history to win gold in all three IIHF world championship tournaments – the World U18 Championships, the World Junior Championships and the World Championships.

Kakko played for Finland senior team in the 2019 World Championship where he led the team with six goals during tournament, while Finland won gold medals.

== Personal life ==
Kakko has Type 1 diabetes and celiac disease.

== Career statistics ==
=== Regular season and playoffs ===
| | | | Regular season | | | | | Playoffs |
| Season | Team | League | GP | G | A | Pts | PIM | GP | G | A | Pts | PIM |
|---|---|---|---|---|---|---|---|---|---|---|---|---|
| 2016–17 | TPS | FIN U18 | 35 | 24 | 17 | 41 | 8 | 5 | 7 | 0 | 7 | 2 |
| 2016–17 | TPS | FIN U20 | 7 | 0 | 4 | 4 | 0 | 3 | 0 | 1 | 1 | 0 |
| 2017–18 | TPS | FIN U18 | 6 | 7 | 4 | 11 | 4 | 5 | 4 | 5 | 9 | 2 |
| 2017–18 | TPS | FIN U20 | 38 | 25 | 30 | 55 | 16 | — | — | — | — | — |
| 2017–18 | TPS | Liiga | 6 | 0 | 1 | 1 | 0 | — | — | — | — | — |
| 2018–19 | TPS | Liiga | 45 | 22 | 16 | 38 | 10 | 5 | 4 | 1 | 5 | 6 |
| 2019–20 | New York Rangers | NHL | 66 | 10 | 13 | 23 | 14 | 3 | 0 | 0 | 0 | 0 |
| 2020–21 | New York Rangers | NHL | 48 | 9 | 8 | 17 | 10 | — | — | — | — | — |
| 2021–22 | New York Rangers | NHL | 43 | 7 | 11 | 18 | 10 | 19 | 2 | 3 | 5 | 2 |
| 2022–23 | New York Rangers | NHL | 82 | 18 | 22 | 40 | 8 | 7 | 1 | 1 | 2 | 0 |
| 2023–24 | New York Rangers | NHL | 61 | 13 | 6 | 19 | 24 | 15 | 1 | 1 | 2 | 0 |
| 2024–25 | New York Rangers | NHL | 30 | 4 | 10 | 14 | 14 | — | — | — | — | — |
| 2024–25 | Seattle Kraken | NHL | 49 | 10 | 20 | 30 | 24 | — | — | — | — | — |
| 2025–26 | Seattle Kraken | NHL | 65 | 13 | 27 | 40 | 14 | — | — | — | — | — |
| Liiga totals | | | 51 | 22 | 17 | 39 | 10 | 5 | 4 | 1 | 5 | 6 |
| NHL totals | | | 444 | 84 | 117 | 201 | 118 | 44 | 4 | 5 | 9 | 2 |

=== International ===
| Year | Team | Event | Result | GP | G | A | Pts | PIM |
|---|---|---|---|---|---|---|---|---|
| 2018 | Finland | WJC18 | 1st place, gold medalist(s) | 7 | 4 | 6 | 10 | 2 |
| 2019 | Finland | WJC | 1st place, gold medalist(s) | 7 | 2 | 3 | 5 | 0 |
| 2019 | Finland | WC | 1st place, gold medalist(s) | 10 | 6 | 1 | 7 | 0 |
| 2023 | Finland | WC | 7th | 8 | 1 | 5 | 6 | 0 |
| 2025 | Finland | 4NF | 4th | 2 | 0 | 1 | 1 | 0 |
| 2026 | Finland | OG | 3rd place, bronze medalist(s) | 6 | 3 | 2 | 5 | 2 |
| Junior totals | | | | 14 | 6 | 9 | 15 | 2 |
| Senior totals | | | | 26 | 10 | 9 | 19 | 2 |

== Awards and honours ==
| Award | Year | Ref |
Liiga
| Jarmo Wasama Memorial Trophy | 2019 | |
| President's Trophy | 2019 | |

Awards and achievements
| Preceded by Nils Lundkvist | New York Rangers first-round draft pick 2019 | Succeeded by Alexis Lafrenière |
