= Raimo Helminen =

Finnish ice hockey player

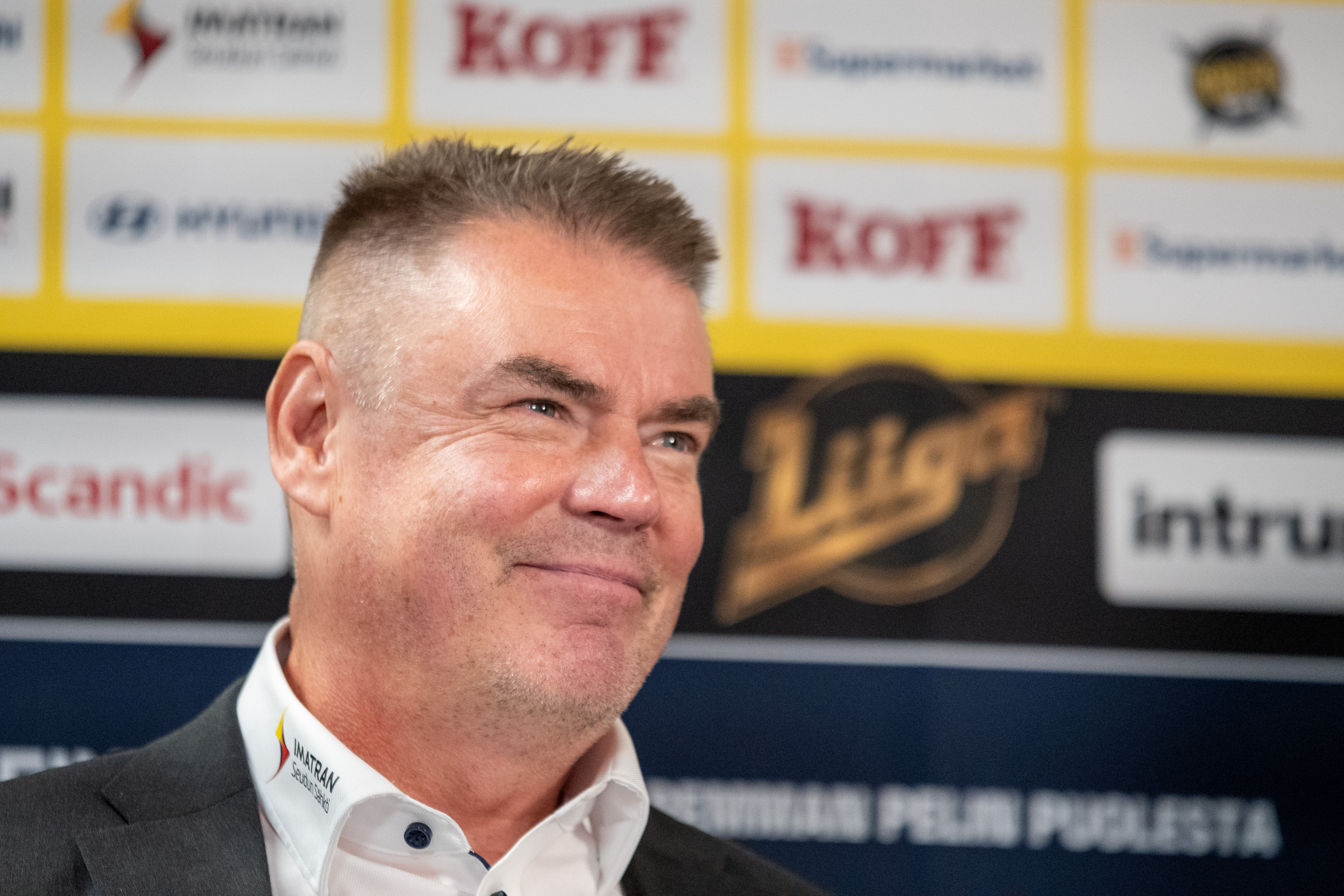
- Raimo Helminen on 1 September 2026
- Born: 11 March 1964 (age 62) Tampere, FIN
- Height: 6 ft 0 in (183 cm)
- Weight: 194 lb (88 kg; 13 st 12 lb)
- Position: Centre
- Shot: Left
- Played for: Ilves; New York Rangers; Minnesota North Stars; New York Islanders; Malmö IF Redhawks
- National team: Finland
- NHL draft: 35th overall, 1984; New York Rangers
- Playing career: 1982–2008
- Website: https://www.raipe.fi

Raimo Ilmari Helminen (born 11 March 1964 in Tampere, Finland) is a Finnish former professional ice hockey player. He is often called "Raipe" or "Maestro" by his fans. He is the world record holder for most international games played by a hockey player, as well as for tied for being the hockey player in the most Olympic Games, and his 26 seasons as a professional is one of the longest careers in professional hockey history. He was inducted into the IIHF Hall of Fame in 2012.

In the 2022-23 season he is serving as the assistant coach of Ilves. Helminen is credited with invention of the saucer pass.

== Personal life ==
He has a wife, Leena, and two children, Anssi and Nelli.

== Professional career ==
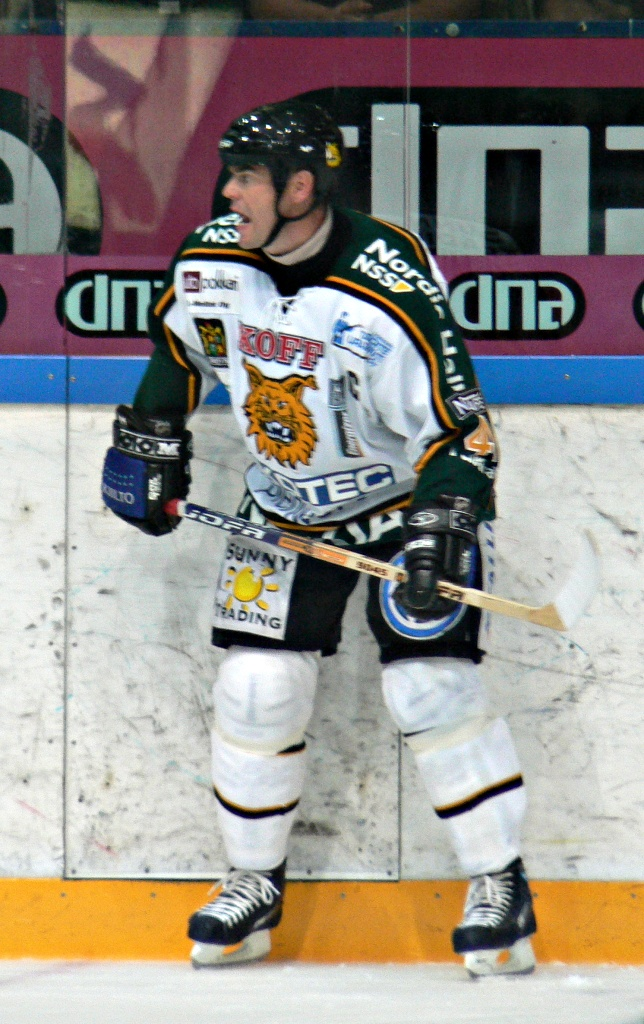
Raimo Helminen in the 2007

=== Early years ===
Helminen has himself said that he developed most of his skills when he was young and spent all his free time playing in outdoor ice rinks in Koivistonkylä, Tampere. Before he focused on ice hockey he had also played football.

Helminen started his career in his native town, playing for one of oldest teams in the country, Ilves. After two gold medals in junior leagues, Helminen got to play for Ilves in the SM-liiga, Finland's top ice hockey league, in 1982. His first international success came in 1984 when Finland won silver in the U20 World Championship tournament in Sweden. Helminen broke the record for most points scored in an under-20 tournament and was selected for the All-Star team. This attracted the attention of people scouting new talent for the professional teams in the National Hockey League in North America. That spring Helminen also took part in his first Olympic Games in Sarajevo.

=== NHL ===
The following season he was one of the best players for Ilves, being the second highest scorer for his team and third overall in the league. As the centre of the first line, he led Ilves to a league championship victory for the first time in the league's history.

The New York Rangers drafted him in the 1984 NHL entry draft as their second pick (2nd round, number 35), and Helminen headed for the NHL in the fall of 1985. He finished his rookie season with an outstanding 40 points in 66 games. The next fall, however, the new team management sold most of their young players and Helminen ended up with the Minnesota North Stars.

=== Difficulties and success ===
The next season proved more difficult, and Helminen ended up playing a lot in the minor leagues. In the fall of 1987 he returned to home soil to play for Ilves again. He proved to be a success and secured a place in the national team for the 1988 Winter Olympics. There he helped his country win their first Olympic medal (silver) in ice hockey.

His performance included 10 points in seven games and assisting two goals in Finland's surprise 3–1 victory over gold medal hopefuls Canada. The tournament left NHL scouts wondering why this player was not playing in North America. Eventually Helminen got another chance to play in the NHL, this time for the New York Islanders.

=== Back problems and Sweden ===
In the spring of 1988 Helminen started having back problems that would hinder his career for the next couple of years. Because of this injury his 1988–89 season for the Islanders was a disappointment—although he played spectacularly for New York's AHL Springfield Indians farm team for a month—and he left the Islanders for Malmö IF in Sweden.

Helminen's play in Malmö IF was at times very good and he earned the respect of the fans. However, his back would not heal properly until the summer of 1992 after Malmö had won the Swedish Elitserien, the top ice hockey league in the country. After being Elitserien's first ever foreign scoring winner in 1993, Helminen helped Malmö IF win another championship in 1994.

=== Late career ===
In 1996 Helminen returned again to his home town to play for Ilves and quickly became a fan favorite again. In 1998 Ilves won silver medals in the SM-liiga and Helminen was voted the best player of the season. He was also selected for the league's All-Star team in three consecutive years having remained one of the top scorers. Helminen also made the SM-liiga record for most penalty minutes in one game with (55PIM), when he first spat towards the referee and after that tried to assault him, first with his stick and then with his fists, verbally abusing the referee all the while. In 2014 Markus Palmroth broke the record with 59 PIM. Helminen served as the captain of Ilves from 1999 until the end of his career in 2008, although he was temporarily stripped of his captaincy during the 2006–07 season after being thrown out during a game (he was reinstated after one game). At 44 years of age, Helminen was the oldest active player during the SM-liiga 2007–08 season.

Helminen officially retired after the 2007–08 SM-liiga season ended for Ilves, when they were defeated by Kärpät in the quarter-finals of the SM-liiga playoffs.

== International play ==
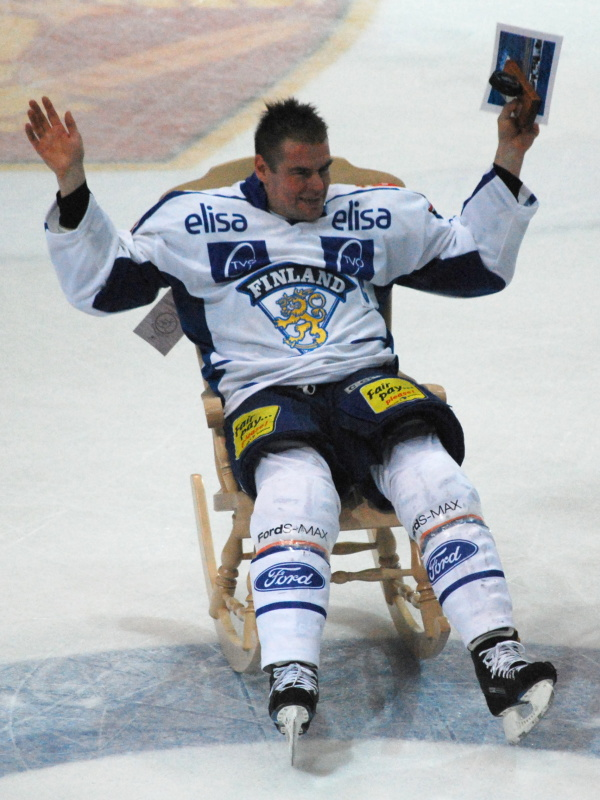
- Helminen in the chair after his last international match

Medal record

Representing Finland

Men's ice hockey

Olympic Games
Silver medal – second place	1988 Calgary	
Bronze medal – third place	1994 Lillehammer	
Bronze medal – third place	1998 Nagano	

World Championships
Gold medal – first place	1995 Sweden	
Silver medal – second place	1994 Italy	
Silver medal – second place	1998 Switzerland	
Silver medal – second place	1999 Norway	
Silver medal – second place	2001 Germany	
Bronze medal – third place	2000 Russia	

World Junior Championships
Silver medal – second place	1984 Sweden	

Helminen played in a few international tournaments throughout the 1980s and was on the silver winning team of the 1988 Winter Olympics. This was almost the last international glory Helminen was ever to get as then current National team head coach Pentti Matikainen decided that Helminen's time in the national team was over. After Matikainen was fired and the new head coach, Swede Curt "Curre" Lindström took over in 1994 Helminen was re-instated to the national team. In the 1990s Finland began gaining consistent success in international ice hockey. This included World Championship medals 1994 (silver) and 1995 (gold) and Olympic medals in 1994 (bronze) and 1998 (bronze). Helminen remained a favourite pick in the national team consistently through the decade and played an important role in the national team's successes. Helminen participated in 11 World Championships tournaments between 1985 and 2002. Helminen holds a world record of most international games. Helminen played a total of 331 times for Finland and scored 52 goals and assisted 155, totaling 207 points.

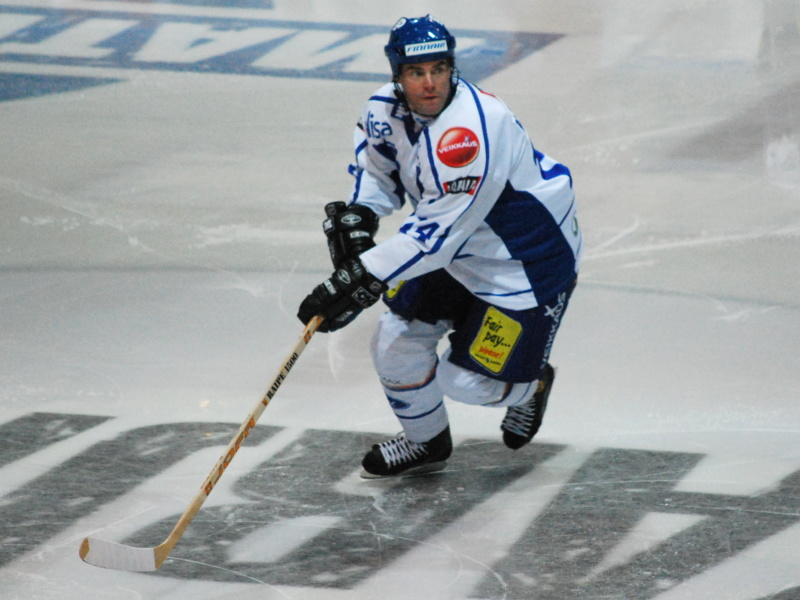
Helminen playing his last international game for Finland.

His number originally was 14, but he had to change it to 41 when Ilves retired 14 in honour of Lasse Oksanen, a former player of the team. Helminen continued to wear 14 when he played for Team Finland. At the beginning of the 2008–09 season, Ilves announced that Helminen's number 41 would also be retired.

The 2002 World Championship Tournament was Helminen's last World Championship tournament callup since Helminen was dropped as the last player from the 2003 World Championship squad by Hannu Aravirta

In February 2008, Helminen returned to the national team for one game, his farewell match. Finland faced the Czech Republic in the LG Hockey Tournament, which is part of the European Hockey Tour. Although the tournament is held in Sweden, the match was played in Tampere, which is Helminen's hometown. Helminen recorded an assist on a goal scored by Tuomas Pihlman four seconds before the end of the game. Finland won the game 6–1.

In 1998, Helminen and Dieter Hegen (Germany) became the third and fourth ice hockey players to compete at five Olympics, after Udo Kießling (Germany) and Petter Thoresen (Norway). Helminen's appearance at the 2002 Olympics made him the first ice hockey player to compete at six Olympics, with compatriot Teemu Selänne becoming the second in 2014.

== Coaching career ==
Helminen has been assistant coach of Ilves since late parts of the 2009–10 season, when Juha Pajuoja got the job as the head coach. Pajuoja was sacked in late October in 2011 and replaced by Seppo Hiitelä.

He was also assistant coach of the Finnish U20 team in the 2010 and 2011 World Championship, before being promoted to head coach for the 2012 tournament.

Helminen coached SaiPa to the Liiga finals in the 2024-25 season.

== Career statistics ==
=== Regular season and playoffs ===
			Regular season					Playoffs
Season	Team	League	GP	G	A	Pts	PIM	GP	G	A	Pts	PIM
1981–82	Ilves	FIN U20	30	28	31	59	22	4	4	2	6	0
1982–83	Ilves	FIN U20	13	7	20	27	20	3	1	5	6	2
1982–83	Ilves	SM-l	31	2	3	5	0	6	0	0	0	2
1983–84	Ilves	SM-l	37	17	13	30	14	2	0	0	0	2
1984–85	Ilves	SM-l	36	21	36	57	20	9	2	4	6	10
1985–86	New York Rangers	NHL	66	10	30	40	10	2	0	0	0	0
1986–87	New York Rangers	NHL	21	2	4	6	2	—	—	—	—	—
1986–87	New Haven Nighthawks	AHL	6	0	2	2	0	—	—	—	—	—
1986–87	Minnesota North Stars	NHL	6	0	1	1	0	—	—	—	—	—
1987–88	Ilves	SM-l	31	20	23	43	42	4	1	1	2	10
1988–89	New York Islanders	NHL	24	1	11	12	4	—	—	—	—	—
1988–89	Springfield Indians	AHL	16	6	11	17	0	—	—	—	—	—
1989–90	Malmö IF	SWE.2	29	26	30	56	16	3	2	1	3	2
1990–91	Malmö IF	SEL	33	12	18	30	14	2	0	1	1	4
1991–92	Malmö IF	SEL	40	9	18	27	24	10	1	3	4	4
1992–93	Malmö IF	SEL	40	9	33	42	59	6	1	0	1	8
1993–94	Malmö IF	SEL	38	20	34	54	26	11	1	7	8	8
1994–95	Malmö IF	SEL	35	10	19	29	55	7	3	3	6	4
1995–96	Malmö IF	SEL	40	8	19	27	53	5	1	3	4	12
1996–97	Ilves	SM-l	49	11	39	50	54	8	1	5	6	2
1997–98	Ilves	SM-l	46	12	36	48	42	9	3	5	8	10
1998–99	Ilves	SM-l	53	12	38	50	44	4	0	3	3	2
1999–2000	Ilves	SM-l	51	7	38	45	68	3	1	0	1	12
2000–01	Ilves	SM-l	56	9	37	46	28	9	1	6	7	2
2001–02	Ilves	SM-l	56	7	34	41	12	3	0	0	0	0
2002–03	Ilves	SM-l	53	10	21	31	77	—	—	—	—	—
2003–04	Ilves	SM-l	56	9	34	43	46	7	1	3	4	2
2004–05	Ilves	SM-l	53	7	21	28	45	7	0	1	1	2
2005–06	Ilves	SM-l	46	7	18	25	34	4	1	1	2	0
2006–07	Ilves	SM-l	43	5	12	17	47	7	0	0	0	12
2007–08	Ilves	SM-l	53	5	16	21	53	9	3	2	5	2
SM-l totals			751	161	420	581	626	91	14	31	45	70
NHL totals			117	13	46	59	16	2	0	0	0	0
SEL totals			226	68	141	209	231	41	7	17	24	40

=== International ===
Year	Team	Event	GP	G	A	Pts	PIM
1982	Finland	EJC	5	0	3	3	2
1983	Finland	WJC	7	0	5	5	0
1984	Finland	WJC	7	11	13	24	4
1984	Finland	OLY	6	0	2	2	2
1985	Finland	WC	10	4	5	9	2
1987	Finland	CC	5	0	3	3	0
1988	Finland	OLY	7	2	8	10	4
1990	Finland	WC	4	0	0	0	0
1992	Finland	OLY	8	1	2	3	0
1994	Finland	OLY	8	1	5	6	8
1994	Finland	WC	8	1	5	6	0
1995	Finland	WC	8	1	7	8	2
1996	Finland	WC	6	0	4	4	0
1996	Finland	WCH	3	0	1	1	0
1997	Finland	WC	8	0	6	6	0
1998	Finland	OLY	6	2	0	2	2
1998	Finland	WC	10	2	9	11	0
1999	Finland	WC	10	1	3	4	2
2000	Finland	WC	9	2	2	4	0
2001	Finland	WC	9	1	5	6	0
2002	Finland	OLY	4	0	1	1	0
2002	Finland	WC	9	0	2	2	2
Junior totals			19	11	21	32	6
Senior totals			138	18	70	88	24

== Coaching history ==
Head coach

- Finland U20, World Junior Ice Hockey Championships: 2012, 2020
- Ilves 2013, Liiga
- TPS 2020-2021, Liiga
- HC Pustertal 2021-2022, ICEHL
- HC '05 BB 2023-2024, Tipos Extraliga
- SaiPa 2024-2026, Liiga

Asst. coach

- Ilves 2010–2012, SM-liiga
- Finland U20, World Junior Ice Hockey Championships: 2010, 2011, 2015
- Barys Astana 2014-2015, KHL
- Dinamo Riga 2015-2016, KHL
- Jokerit 2016-2019, KHL
- Ilves 2022-2023, Liiga

== Awards ==
- SM-liiga, Kanada-malja champion – 1984-85
- SM-liiga, Runners-up – 1997-98
- SM-liiga, Bronze – 2000-01
- Elitserien, Le Mat Trophy champion – 1991-92, 1993-94
- Swedish Division 1, Promotion (Malmö) – 1989-90
- Lasse Oksanen trophy for best player during the SM-liiga regular season – 1998
- Kultainen kypärä trophy for best player as voted by the players – 1998

== Achievements ==
- Best Player of Team Finland with Esa Tikkanen and Jarmo Myllys (World Championships 1984)
- All Star Team (World Championships 1984; SM-liiga 1987–88, 1996–97, 1997–98, 1998–99)
- Most assists (Elitserien, 1992–93)
- Most points (Elitserien, 1993–94)
- The first foreign player to be the top scorer of the Swedish Elitserien (1993–94)
- Best Player (SM-liiga 1997–98)
- Most assists (155) and points (207) scored for Team Finland
- World record holder for most international games played (331)
- One of the only two (with Selänne) ice hockey players who have participated in six Olympic Games: Sarajevo 1984, Calgary 1988, Albertville 1992, Lillehammer 1994, Nagano 1998 and Salt Lake City 2002
- Inducted into the IIHF Hall of Fame in 2012

== See also ==
- List of athletes with the most appearances at Olympic Games

Preceded by Kimmo Rintanen	Winner of the Kultainen kypärä trophy 1997–98	Succeeded by Brian Rafalski
Preceded by Jani Hurme	Winner of the Lasse Oksanen trophy 1997–98	Succeeded by Jan Caloun
Preceded by Esa Tikkanen	Winner of the President's trophy 2000–01	Succeeded by Janne Ojanen
Preceded by Hannu Mattila	Captain of Ilves; 1999–2008	Succeeded by Pasi Määttänen
