= Harri Laurila =

Finnish ice hockey player and coach

- Born: 30 April 1965 (age 60) Tampere, Finland
- Height: 182 cm (6 ft 0 in)
- Weight: 87 kg (192 lb; 13 st 10 lb)
- Position: Defense
- Shot: Left
- Played for: Kiekkoreipas; Tappara; JyP HT; Ässät; Klagenfurter AC; EC Graz; Kölner Haie; HC Thurgau; HPK; EK Zell am See; FPS; KOOVEE; Kiekko-Ahma; PaKa
- NHL draft: 182nd overall, 1983; Boston Bruins
- Playing career: 1982–2002

Harri Laurila (born 30 April 1965) is a Finnish retired ice hockey player, currently serving as assistant coach to the Tampereen Ilves Naiset of the Naisten Liiga. He competed in the men's tournament at the 1992 Winter Olympics.

== Career statistics ==
=== Regular season and playoffs ===
			Regular season					Playoffs
Season	Team	League	GP	G	A	Pts	PIM	GP	G	A	Pts	PIM
1982–83	Kiekkoreipas	FIN U20	16	4	4	8	6	—	—	—	—	—
1982–83	Kiekkoreipas	SM-l	36	1	3	4	12	—	—	—	—	—
1983–84	Tappara	SM-l	35	2	7	9	4	7	0	0	0	2
1984–85	Tappara	SM-l	35	3	7	10	8	—	—	—	—	—
1985–86	Tappara	SM-l	32	4	6	10	4	8	0	5	5	2
1986–87	Tappara	SM-l	44	6	8	14	18	9	0	1	1	4
1987–88	Tappara	SM-l	42	8	6	14	24	10	0	3	3	4
1988–89	Tappara	SM-l	44	9	15	24	8	8	2	3	5	0
1989–90	Tappara	SM-l	41	8	10	18	18	7	1	2	3	8
1990–91	Jyp HT	SM-l	42	6	21	27	14	7	1	3	4	6
1991–92	Jyp HT	SM-l	44	12	20	32	8	10	1	4	5	4
1992–93	Jyp HT	SM-l	44	8	17	25	36	10	1	3	4	4
1993–94	Jyp HT	SM-l	48	8	17	25	22	4	0	1	1	2
1994–95	Ässät	SM-l	50	4	7	11	26	7	0	0	0	2
1995–96	Ässät	SM-l	35	2	9	11	18	—	—	—	—	—
1995–96	Tappara	SM-l	13	1	3	4	33	4	0	2	2	4
1996–97	Tappara	SM-l	48	7	15	22	12	3	0	1	1	0
1997–97	Klagenfurter AC	AUT	47	5	26	31	12	—	—	—	—	—
1998–99	EC Graz	AUT	—	—	—	—	—	—	—	—	—	—
1998–99	Kölner Haie	DEL	4	0	2	2	2	—	—	—	—	—
1998–99	HC Thurgau	CHE.2	18	0	8	8	10	—	—	—	—	—
1999–2000	HPK	SM-l	11	0	0	0	0	—	—	—	—	—
1999–2000	EK Zell am See	AUT.2	27	7	31	38	20	—	—	—	—	—
2000–01	FPS	Mestis	1	0	0	0	4	—	—	—	—	—
2000–01	EK Zell am See	AUT	31	6	35	41	8	—	—	—	—	—
2001–02	KOOVEE	FIN.3	9	1	13	14	4	—	—	—	—	—
2001–02	Kiekko-Ahma	FIN.4	14	6	2	8	6	—	—	—	—	—
2001–02	PaKa	FIN.4	—	—	—	—	—	2	0	2	2	0
SM-l totals			644	89	171	260	265	94	6	28	34	42

=== International ===
Year	Team	Event	GP	G	A	Pts	PIM
1982	Finland	EJC	5	1	0	1	4
1983	Finland	EJC	5	0	3	3	17
1984	Finland	WJC	7	1	1	2	4
1985	Finland	WJC	7	2	2	4	6
1992	Finland	OG	8	0	0	0	2
1992	Finland	WC	8	0	1	1	2
Junior totals			24	4	6	10	31
Senior totals			16	0	1	1	4
