= Jarmo Myllys =

Finnish ice hockey player

- Born: 29 May 1965 (age 60) Savonlinna, Finland
- Height: 5 ft 8 in (173 cm)
- Weight: 171 lb (78 kg; 12 st 3 lb)
- Position: Goaltender
- Caught: Left
- Played for: Ilves; Lukko; Minnesota North Stars; San Jose Sharks; Luleå HF; Espoo Blues; SaiPa; HV71
- National team: Finland
- NHL draft: 172nd overall, 1987; Minnesota North Stars
- Playing career: 1982–2005

Jarmo Pentti Kalevi Myllys (born 29 May 1965) is a Finnish former professional ice hockey goaltender. He was drafted by the Minnesota North Stars as their ninth-round pick, #172 overall, in the 1987 NHL entry draft. He is currently the goalkeeping coach for Austrian hockey team EC KAC of the EBEL. His jersey number, #35, was retired in Luleå in 2011.

== Playing career ==
=== Early career ===
Myllys was born in Savonlinna, and started playing ice hockey for the local team Savonlinnan Pallokerho or SaPKo. He played his first adult season (1982–1983) in SaPko, but moved to Tampere for SM-Liiga games in Ilves. Myllys spent a total of three seasons (1983–1986) with Ilves, then moved to Rauman Lukko where he stayed for two seasons (1986–1988) before moving to the NHL.

=== NHL career ===
Myllys gained a spot in the Minnesota North Stars lineup. He played 6 NHL games in the 1988–1989 season but spent most of the year with the North Stars' farmteam, Kalamazoo Wings of the IHL. In his 3 seasons (1988–1991) with North Stars Myllys never played more than 10 games in a season. He spent most of these seasons in the IHL. When the San Jose Sharks were formed in 1991 Myllys moved to San Jose along with several North Stars players in the Dispersal Draft. Myllys played 27 games with the Sharks during the 1991–1992 season. This was his last season in the NHL, as Myllys returned to Finland in 1992.

=== Return from the NHL ===
In 1992 Myllys joined the 1 Divisioona team KooKoo. After one season with KooKoo, Myllys moved to Lukko and stayed there for the 1993–1994 season. After his second season since his return in Finland, Myllys signed with Swedish Elitserien team Luleå HF.

Myllys established himself as a star in Sweden, staying with Luleå for 7 seasons (1994–2001). During that time Myllys won several awards and played twice in the Elitserien all-star game. Myllys also scored two goals in two Elitserien games, which is a rare feat for a goaltender. Myllys returned to Finland in 2001.

Jarmo Myllys signed with Espoo Blues in 2001. He played with the Blues for 2 seasons (2001–2003) with little success. After his time with the Blues, Myllys moved closer to his hometown in order to play with SaiPa and played there for the 2003–2004 season. Myllys played in Elitserien with HV71 in the playoffs, then returned to SaiPa for his final season. Myllys retired from professional ice hockey after the 2004–2005 season.

== International play ==
Medal record

Representing Finland

Ice hockey

WInter Olympics
Silver medal – second place	1988 Calgary	
Bronze medal – third place	1994 Lillehammer	
Bronze medal – third place	1998 Nagano	

World Championships
Gold medal – first place	1995 Sweden	
Silver medal – second place	1994 Italy	
Silver medal – second place	1998 Switzerland	
Silver medal – second place	2001 Germany	

World Junior Championships
Bronze medal – third place	1984 Sweden	

Myllys made a total of 188 appearances for Finnish national ice hockey team. He played in seven World Championships, three Winter Olympics, and one Canada Cup. Myllys won a gold medal at the 1995 World Championships, helping Finland win its first world championship.

== Career statistics ==
=== Regular season and playoffs ===
			Regular season									Playoffs
Season	Team	League	GP	W	L	T	MIN	GA	SO	GAA	SV%	GP	W	L	MIN	GA	SO	GAA	SV%
1982–83	SaPKo	FIN-2	13	—	—	—	—	76	—	—	.836	—	—	—	—	—	—	—	—
1983–84	Ilves U20	FIN U20	—	—	—	—	—	—	—	—	—	—	—	—	—	—	—	—	—
1983–84	Ilves	FIN	9	—	—	—	540	27	1	3.00	.888	—	—	—	—	—	—	—	—
1984–85	Ilves U20	FIN U20	—	—	—	—	—	—	—	—	—	—	—	—	—	—	—	—	—
1984–85	Ilves	FIN	9	—	—	—	540	23	1	2.55	.902	2	—	—	120	3	0	1.50	.952
1985–86	Ilves U20	FIN U20	—	—	—	—	—	—	—	—	—	—	—	—	—	—	—	—	—
1985–86	Ilves	FIN	16	—	—	—	—	60	—	4.13	.902	—	—	—	—	—	—	—	—
1986–87	Lukko	FIN	43	16	20	7	2542	160	2	3.77	.892	—	—	—	—	—	—	—	—
1987–88	Lukko	FIN	43	—	—	—	2468	129	5	3.13	.900	8	4	4	480	23	0	2.87	.909
1988–89	Minnesota North Stars	NHL	6	1	4	0	238	22	0	5.55	.841	—	—	—	—	—	—	—	—
1988–89	Kalamazoo Wings	IHL	28	13	8	4	1523	93	0	3.66	.890	6	2	4	419	22	0	3.15	—
1989–90	Minnesota North Stars	NHL	4	0	3	0	156	16	0	6.15	.805	—	—	—	—	—	—	—	—
1989–90	Kalamazoo Wings	IHL	49	31	9	3	2715	159	1	3.51	.901	7	2	4	356	22	0	3.71	—
1990–91	Minnesota North Stars	NHL	2	0	2	0	78	8	0	6.12	.860	—	—	—	—	—	—	—	—
1990–91	Kalamazoo Wings	IHL	38	24	13	1	2278	144	1	3.79	—	10	6	4	600	26	0	2.60	—
1991–92	San Jose Sharks	NHL	27	3	18	1	1374	115	0	5.02	.867	—	—	—	—	—	—	—	—
1991–92	Kansas City Blades	IHL	5	5	0	0	307	15	0	2.93	.882	—	—	—	—	—	—	—	—
1992–93	KooKoo	FIN-2	45	27	13	5	2712	144	0	3.18	.909	—	—	—	—	—	—	—	—
1993–94	Lukko	FIN	46	26	16	4	2762	131	2	2.85	.908	9	5	4	554	16	1	1.73	.946
1994–95	Luleå HF	SWE	37	—	—	—	2220	105	4	2.84	.902	9	—	—	578	27	0	2.80	.914
1995–96	Luleå HF	SWE	39	—	—	—	2300	97	6	2.53	.898	13	—	—	791	27	2	2.05	.925
1996–97	Luleå HF	SWE	37	—	—	—	2160	76	5	2.11	.919	10	—	—	612	23	1	2.25	.893
1997–98	Luleå HF	SWE	43	—	—	—	2534	111	6	2.63	.897	3	—	—	180	10	0	3.33	.893
1998–99	Luleå HF	SWE	47	—	—	—	2839	129	2	2.73	.890	9	—	—	570	22	0	2.32	.893
1999–00	Luleå HF	SWE	40	—	—	—	2422	102	6	2.53	.896	9	—	—	535	23	1	2.58	.902
2000–01	Luleå HF	SWE	41	—	—	—	2380	110	2	2.77	.891	10	—	—	613	34	0	3.33	.880
2001–02	Espoo Blues	FIN	46	19	19	7	2724	136	3	2.99	.898	3	0	3	178	9	0	3.04	.898
2002–03	Espoo Blues	FIN	19	8	5	5	1113	38	3	2.05	.929	7	3	4	444	17	0	2.30	.925
2003–04	SaiPa	FIN	34	9	15	7	1941	94	3	2.91	.899	—	—	—	—	—	—	—	—
2003–04	HV71	SWE	4	3	1	0	230	7	1	1.83	.945	1	0	1	60	4	0	4.00	.882
2004–05	SaiPa	FIN	45	10	25	10	2564	136	1	3.18	.889	—	—	—	—	—	—	—	—
NHL totals			39	4	27	1	1846	161	0	5.23	.859	—	—	—	—	—	—	—	—

=== International ===
Year	Team	Event	GP	W	L	T	MIN	GA	SO	GAA	SV%
1983	Finland	U18	4	—	—	—	200	9	—	2.70	—
1984	Finland	WJC	4	3	1	0	240	13	0	3.25	—
1985	Finland	WJC	1	1	0	0	60	2	0	2.00	—
1987	Finland	WC	8	4	3	1	464	27	0	3.49	.895
1987	Finland	CC	1	0	0	0	20	1	0	3.00	.875
1988	Finland	OLY	6	4	1	1	360	11	1	1.83	.928
1994	Finland	OLY	5	5	0	0	300	3	2	0.60	.966
1994	Finland	WC	7	—	—	—	400	10	—	1.35	.942
1995	Finland	WC	7	5	1	1	420	12	2	1.71	.917
1996	Finland	WC	4	0	2	2	238	12	0	3.02	.900
1996	Finland	WCH	2	1	1	0	120	8	0	4.00	.789
1997	Finland	WC	6	4	2	0	357	10	1	1.68	.938
1998	Finland	OLY	4	1	3	0	237	14	0	3.54	.851
1998	Finland	WC	2	1	1	0	119	4	0	2.02	.923
Junior totals			9	—	—	—	500	24	—	2.88	—
Senior totals			52	—	—	—	3035	115	—	2.27	—

Preceded by Pekka Järvelä	Winner of the Kultainen kypärä trophy 1987–88	Succeeded by Jukka Vilander
Preceded by Hannu Virta	Winner of the President's trophy 1996–97	Succeeded by Teemu Selänne
