= List of Finnish ice hockey champions =

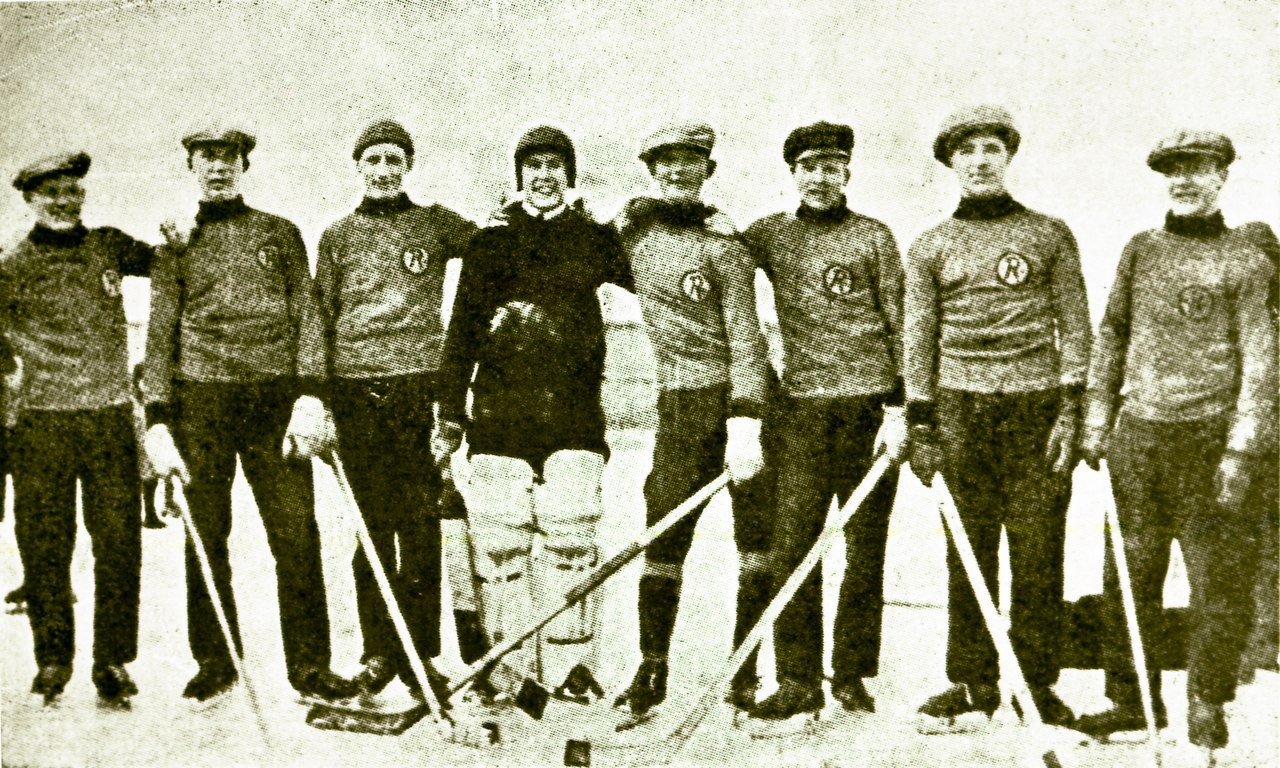
Viipurin Reipas won the inaugural Finnish Championship in 1928.

The Finnish ice hockey champions is a title awarded annually to the winning team of the top-tier ice hockey league in Finland, which currently is SM-liiga since 1975. The championship's present format did not take into effect until the league was originally formed for the 1975–76 season under the name of SM-liiga (preceded by SM-sarja). A team who wins the Finnish Championship is awarded the Kanada-malja ("Canada Bowl") trophy. The winner of the regular season receives the Harry Lindbladin muistopalkinto ("Harry Lindblad Memorial Trophy").

== Winners ==
Until 1933 the championship was played as a Cup series. From the 1933–34 season it was played as a League series. Playoffs were introduced during the 1975–76 season.

1927–1933
Season	Champion	Finalist
1927–28	Reipas	KIF
1928–29	HJK	HPS
1929–30	cancelled	
1930–31	TaPa	HJK
1931–32	HJK	HPS
1932–33	HSK	HJK

1933–1975
Season	Champion	2nd place	3rd place
1933–34	HSK	HPS	Ilves
1934–35	HJK	Ilves	HSK
1935–36	Ilves	KIF	HJK
1936–37	Ilves	KIF	HJK
1937–38	Ilves	HJK	KIF
1938–39	KIF	HJK	Ilves
1939–40	not held		
1940–41	KIF	HJK	Ilves
1941–42	cancelled		
1942–43	KIF	TPS	Ilves
1943–44	stopped		
1944–45	Ilves	Tarmo	KIF
1945–46	Ilves	Tarmo	TBK
1946–47	Ilves	Tarmo	TBK
1947–48	Tarmo	Ilves	TBK
1948–49	Tarmo	Ilves	TuPK
1949–50	Ilves	Tarmo	TBK
1950–51	Ilves	Tarmo	TBK
1951–52	Ilves	HPK	Tarmo
1952–53	TBK	Tarmo	TPS
1953–54	TBK	Karhu-Kissat	HPK
1954–55	TBK	TPS	HIFK
1955–56	TPS	Tarmo	Tappara
1956–57	Ilves	TPS	Tappara
1957–58	Ilves	Tappara	Tarmo
1958–59	Tappara	Koo-Vee	HIFK
1959–60	Ilves	Tappara	Koo-Vee
1960–61	Tappara	Lukko	Koo-Vee
1961–62	Ilves	Koo-Vee	Tappara
1962–63	Lukko	Tappara	Ilves
1963–64	Tappara	Koo-Vee	Ilves
1964–65	Karhut	Ilves	Lukko
1965–66	Ilves	Lukko	SaiPa
1966–67	RU-38	TPS	Ilves
1967–68	Koo-Vee	Ilves	TuTo
1968–69	HIFK	Ilves	Lukko
1969–70	HIFK	Ilves	TuTo
1970–71	Ässät	Jokerit	HIFK
1971–72	Ilves	HJK	HIFK
1972–73	Jokerit	HIFK	Tappara
1973–74	HIFK	Tappara	Ilves
1974–75	Tappara	HIFK	Ilves

=== 1975–present ===
Season	Champion	2nd place	3rd place	Regular season winner
1975–76	TPS	Tappara	Ässät	TPS
1976–77	Tappara	TPS	Koo-Vee	Tappara
1977–78	Ässät	Tappara	TPS	Tappara
1978–79	Tappara	Ässät	TPS	Ässät
1979–80	HIFK	Ässät	Kärpät	TPS
1980–81	Kärpät	Tappara	TPS	Tappara
1981–82	Tappara	TPS	HIFK	TPS
1982–83	HIFK	Jokerit	Ilves	Jokerit
1983–84	Tappara	Ässät	Kärpät	Tappara
1984–85	Ilves	TPS	Kärpät	TPS
1985–86	Tappara	HIFK	Kärpät	Tappara
1986–87	Tappara	Kärpät	HIFK	Kärpät
1987–88	Tappara	Lukko	HIFK	Ilves
1988–89	TPS	JYP	Ilves	TPS
1989–90	TPS	Ilves	Tappara	TPS
1990–91	TPS	KalPa	HPK	TPS
1991–92	Jokerit	JYP	HIFK	JYP
1992–93	TPS	HPK	JYP	TPS
1993–94	Jokerit	TPS	Lukko	TPS
1994–95	TPS	Jokerit	Ässät	Jokerit
1995–96	Jokerit	TPS	Lukko	Jokerit
1996–97	Jokerit	TPS	HPK	Jokerit
1997–98	HIFK	Ilves	Jokerit	TPS
1998–99	TPS	HIFK	HPK	TPS
1999–2000	TPS	Jokerit	HPK	TPS
2000–01	TPS	Tappara	Ilves	Jokerit
2001–02	Jokerit	Tappara	HPK	Tappara
2002–03	Tappara	Kärpät	HPK	HPK
2003–04	Kärpät	TPS	HIFK	TPS
2004–05	Kärpät	Jokerit	HPK	Kärpät
2005–06	HPK	Ässät	Kärpät	Kärpät
2006–07	Kärpät	Jokerit	HPK	Kärpät
2007–08	Kärpät	Blues	Tappara	Kärpät
2008–09	JYP	Kärpät	KalPa	JYP
2009–10	TPS	HPK	JYP	JYP
2010–11	HIFK	Blues	Lukko	JYP
2011–12	JYP	Pelicans	Jokerit	KalPa
2012–13	Ässät	Tappara	JYP	Jokerit
2013–14	Kärpät	Tappara	Lukko	Kärpät
2014–15	Kärpät	Tappara	JYP	Kärpät
2015–16	Tappara	HIFK	Kärpät	HIFK
2016–17	Tappara	KalPa	JYP	Tappara
2017–18	Kärpät	Tappara	HIFK	Kärpät
2018–19	HPK	Kärpät	Tappara	Kärpät
2019–20	cancelled			Kärpät
2020–21	Lukko	TPS	HIFK	Lukko
2021–22	Tappara	TPS	Ilves	Tappara
2022–23	Tappara	Pelicans	Ilves	Tappara
2023–24	Tappara	Pelicans	Kärpät	Tappara
2024–25	KalPa	SaiPa	Ilves	Lukko
2025–26	Tappara	KooKoo	SaiPa	Tappara

== Clubs by titles ==
^	not in top tier
†	not active
‡	merged

Club	Total	SM-sarja			SM-liiga			
Club	Total	Champions	2nd	3rd	Kanada-malja trophy	2nd	3rd	Regular 1st
TBK / Tappara	21	7	4	9	14	9	3	11
Ilves	16	15	7	9	1	2	6	1
TPS	11	1	4	1	10	9	3	13
Kärpät	8	0	0	0	8	4	6	10
HIFK	7	3	2	4	4	3	7	1
Jokerit	6	1	1	0	5	5	2	6
HJK ^{†}	3	3	6	2	0	0	0	0
Ässät	3	1	0	0	2	4	2	1
KIF ^{†}	3	3	3	2	—	—	—	—
Tarmo ^{†}	2	2	7	2	—	—	—	—
Lukko	2	1	2	2	1	1	4	2
HPK	2	0	1	1	2	2	8	1
JYP	2	0	0	0	2	2	5	4
HSK ^{†}	2	2	0	1	—	—	—	—
Koo-Vee ^{†}	1	1	3	2	0	0	1	0
KalPa	1	0	0	0	1	2	1	1
Reipas ^{†}	1	1	0	0	—	—	—	—
TaPa ^{†}	1	1	0	0	—	—	—	—
Karhut ^{‡}	1	1	0	0	—	—	—	—
RU-38 ^{‡}	1	1	0	0	—	—	—	—
HPS ^{†}	0	0	3	0	—	—	—	—
Pelicans	0	—	—	—	0	3	0	0
Blues / Kiekko	0	—	—	—	0	2	0	0
SaiPa	0	0	0	1	0	1	1	0
KooKoo	0	0	0	0	0	1	0	0
Karhu-Kissat ^{^}	0	0	1	0	0	0	0	0
TuTo ^{^}	0	0	0	2	0	0	0	0
TuPK ^{†}	0	0	0	1	—	—	—	—

== Cities by championships ==
City	Total	Clubs
Tampere	39	TBK / Tappara (21), Ilves (16), Koo-Vee (1), TaPa (1)
Helsinki	21	HIFK (7), Jokerit (6), HJK (3), KIF (3), HSK (2)
Turku	11	TPS (11)
Oulu	8	Kärpät (8)
Pori	5	Ässät (3), RU-38 (1), Karhut (1)
Hämeenlinna	4	Tarmo (2), HPK (2)
Jyväskylä	2	JYP (2)
Rauma	2	Lukko (2)
Kuopio	1	KalPa (1)
Viipuri	1	Reipas (1)

== See also ==
- Finnish Hockey Hall of Fame
- Finnish Cup
- Aaro Kivilinna Memorial Trophy

== Sources ==
- passionhockey.com | seasons archives
- eliteprospects.com | teams database
