= Aarne Honkavaara =

Finnish ice hockey player and coach

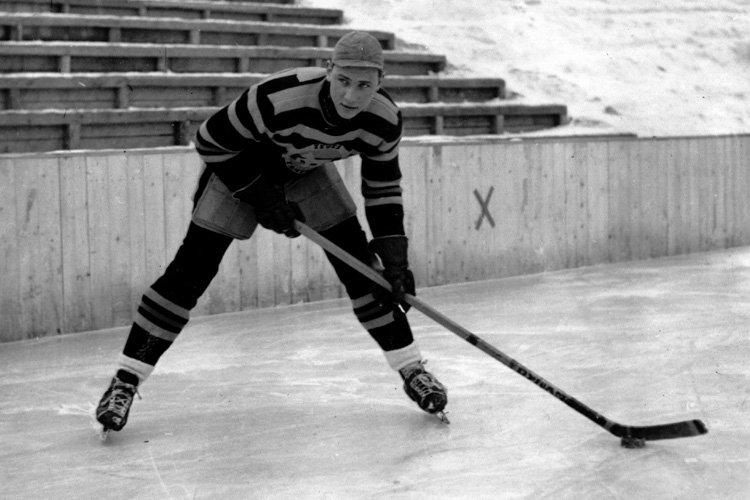
- Honkavaara in 1946
- Born: June 7, 1924; Tampere, Finland
- Died: March 22, 2016 (aged 91); Tampere, Finland
- Height: 6 ft 0 in (183 cm)
- Weight: 187 lb (85 kg; 13 st 5 lb)
- Position: Centre
- Shot: Left
- Played for: Ilves
- National team: Finland
- Playing career: 1943–1952; 1956–1958

Aarne Väinö Edvard Honkavaara (June 7, 1924 – March 22, 2016) was a Finnish ice hockey player and coach. He was born in Tampere, Finland.

== Playing career ==
Honkavaara played his first game of ice hockey when he was 12 years old. The team which he represented was Tampereen Kisa-Veikot. He participated in the Continuation War between 1942 and 1944 and played his first actual SM-sarja game in 1944 against HSK. He played for Ilves, which was along with TBK, one of Tampere's top teams. He played his entire career for Ilves except for a short visit to Canada, where he played in two exhibition games for Sarnia Sailors. His playing career ended in 1953 when he broke his shin after a Polish player fell onto it during a national team game between Finland and Poland. After retiring, he made a two-season return to playing staff, while he was the head coach for Ilves in 1956. He re-retired in 1958 after a single game during his second season after comeback.

== International play ==
Honkavaara was part of Finland national team and played 47 games for them, scoring 46 goals. He was also team captain of the national team during their first participation at the Winter Olympics in 1952.

== Coaching career ==
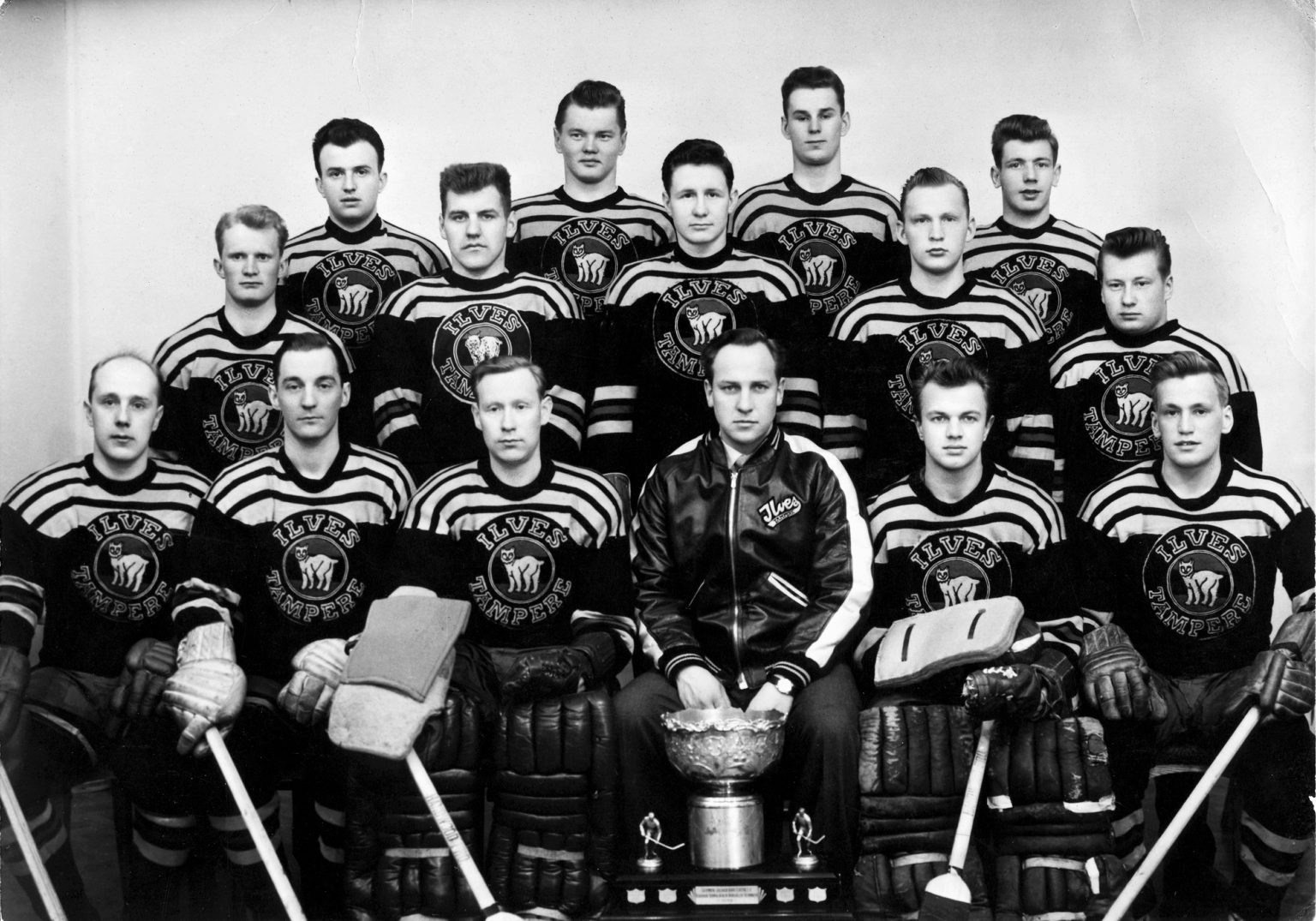
Ilves' championship team from 1957

After retiring as a full-time player, Honkavaara went on to coach Ilves to three Finnish championships and one silver medal. He was also the head coach for the Finland national team between 1954 and 1959.

== Museum founder ==
When the Finnish Hockey Hall of Fame was established on June 14, 1979, Honkavaara was one of its founding members and later served as its chairperson from 1983 to 1996.

== Career statistics ==
=== Regular season and playoffs ===
			Regular season					Playoffs
Season	Team	League	GP	G	A	Pts	PIM	GP	G	A	Pts	PIM
1941–42	Ilves	SM-sarja	—	—	—	—	—	—	—	—	—	—
1942–43	Ilves	SM-sarja	—	—	—	—	—	—	—	—	—	—
1943–44	Ilves	SM-sarja	3	7	2	9	0	—	—	—	—	—
1944–45	Ilves	SM-sarja	3	7	3	10	0	—	—	—	—	—
1945–46	Ilves	SM-sarja	8	25	10	35	0	—	—	—	—	—
1946–47	Ilves	SM-sarja	8	25	9	34	0	—	—	—	—	—
1947–48	Ilves	SM-sarja	6	20	3	23	0	—	—	—	—	—
1948–49	Ilves	SM-sarja	6	18	5	23	0	—	—	—	—	—
1949–50	Ilves	SM-sarja	7	11	10	21	0	—	—	—	—	—
1950–51	Sarnia Sailors	IHL	—	—	—	—	—	—	—	—	—	—
1950–51	Ilves	SM-sarja	10	20	14	34	2	—	—	—	—	—
1951–52	Ilves	SM-sarja	5	10	4	14	2	—	—	—	—	—
1952–53	Ilves	SM-sarja	—	—	—	—	—	—	—	—	—	—
1955–56	Ilves	SM-sarja	1	0	0	0	0	—	—	—	—	—
1956–57	Ilves	SM-sarja	5	0	1	1	0	—	—	—	—	—
1957–58	Ilves	SM-sarja	1	0	0	0	0	—	—	—	—	—
SM-sarja totals			62	143	61	204	4	—	—	—	—	—

=== International ===
Year	Team	Event	Result	GP	G	A	Pts	PIM
1949	Finland	WC	7th	4	6	0	6	0
1951	Finland	WC	7th	6	2	3	5	0
1952	Finland	OG	7th	8	2	2	4	0
Senior totals				47	46	12	58	0

== Bibliography ==
- Dynamo, ISBN 951-98557-5-0 (Book in Finnish)

Preceded by Osmo Huhti	SM-sarja scoring leader 1946–1952	Succeeded by Keijo Kuusela
Preceded by Risto Lindroos	Finnish national men's team head coach 1954–1959	Succeeded by Joe Wirkkunen
Preceded by Risto Lindroos; Erkki Koiso	Ilves head coach 1952–1961; 1967–1968	Succeeded by Seppo Helle; Raimo Vasama
