= 1948–49 SM-sarja season =

Finnish ice hockey season

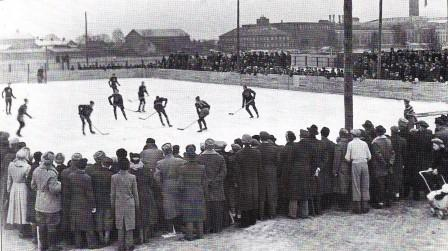
TBK against Ilves during the season

The 1948–49 SM-sarja season was the 18th season of the SM-sarja, the top level of ice hockey in Finland. Eight teams participated in the league, and Tarmo Hameenlinna won the championship.

== Regular season ==
	Club	Sp	W	T	L	GF–GA	Pts
1.	Tarmo Hämeenlinna	7	7	0	0	80:15	14
2.	Ilves Tampere	7	6	0	1	87:16	12
3.	TuPK Turku	7	5	0	2	42:40	10
4.	TBK Tampere	7	4	0	3	65:41	8
5.	HJK Helsinki	7	3	0	4	33:65	6
6.	HSK Helsinki	7	2	0	5	34:81	4
7.	Arsenal Helsinki	7	0	1	6	27:61	1
8.	Karhu-Kissat Helsinki	7	0	1	6	26:75	1

Source: Elite Prospects

Preceded by 1947–48 SM-sarja season	SM-sarja season 1948–49	Succeeded by 1949–50 SM-sarja season
