= Kanada-malja =

Finnish SM-liiga championship trophy

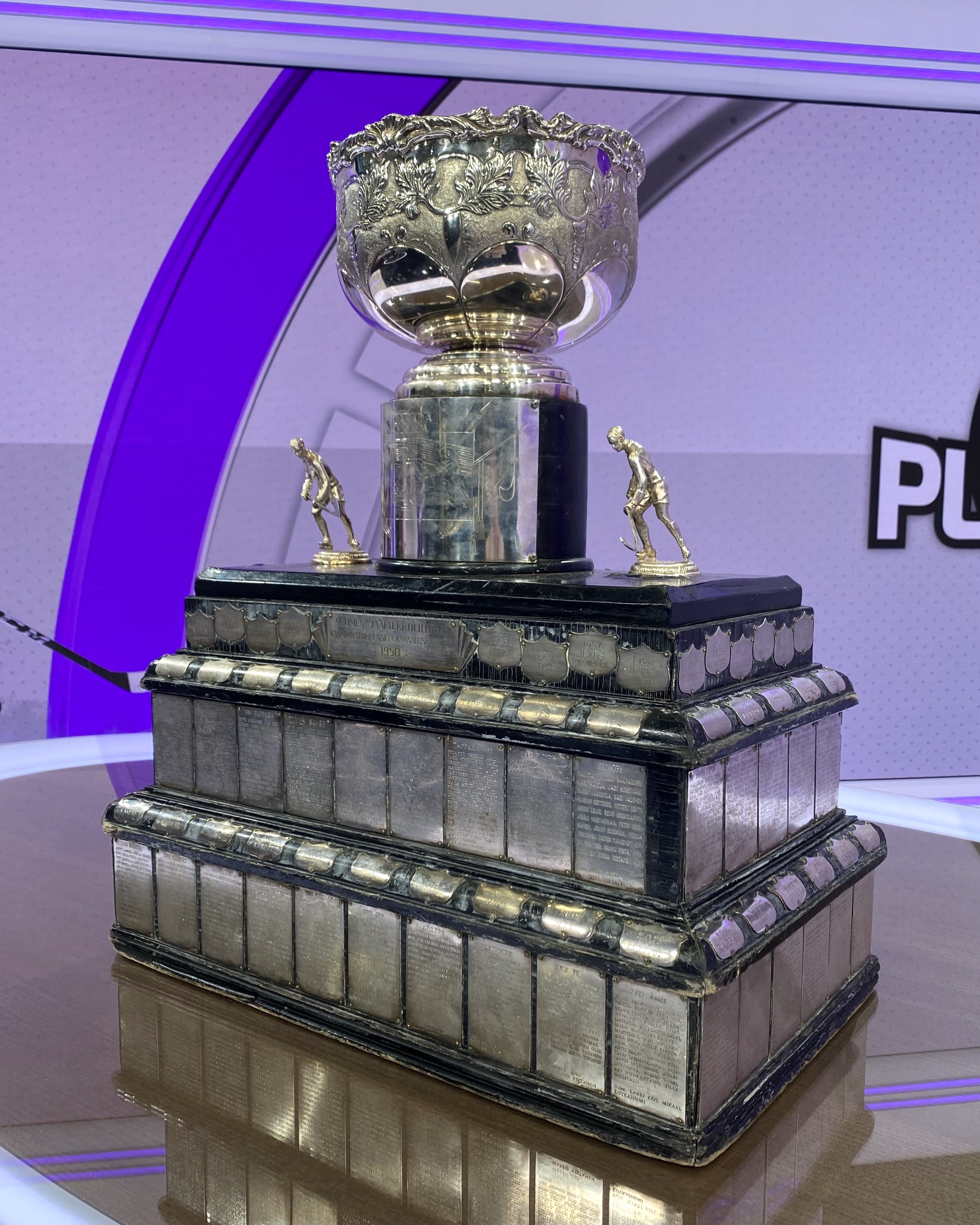
- Sport: Ice hockey
- Awarded for: Playoff champion of the SM-liiga

History
- First award: 1951
- First winner: Ilves (9)
- Most wins: Tappara (21)
- Most recent: Tappara (21)

The Kanada-malja, or Poika (nicknamed "Boy"/"Son"), is an ice hockey club championship trophy, awarded annually to the winner of the Finnish SM-liiga playoffs. Kanada-malja is Finnish for "Canada bowl"; the trophy is so named because it was donated by Canada's Finnish community in 1950.

The Kanada-malja was originally given for the winner of the SM-sarja, but in 1975 when SM-liiga replaced the SM-sarja, the Kanada-malja has been given to the SM-liiga winner.

In 1991 a copy of the Kanada-malja was made and the original was given for display at Suomen Jääkiekkomuseo ("Finnish Ice Hockey Museum"). After the final game, the champion team of the playoffs is presented with the original Kanada-malja, but afterward the cup is returned to the museum and replaced with the copy.

The original trophy is made of nickel silver and the copy is entirely made of silver.

The winner of the regular season title receives the "Harry Lindbladin muistopalkinto" (Harry Lindblad Memorial Trophy), which is not considered as prestigious as the Kanada-malja.

== History ==
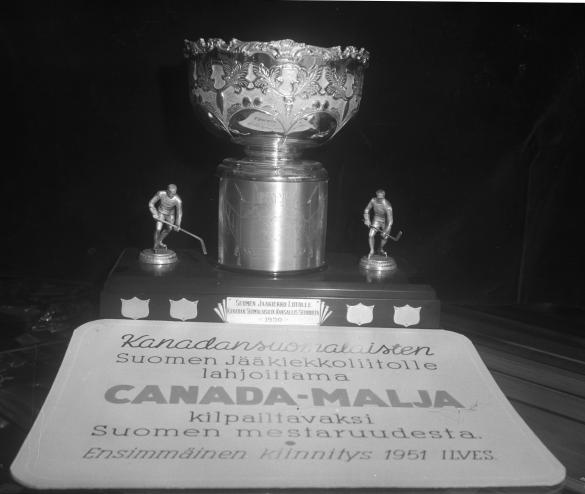
The Kanada-malja in 1951, the first year it was awarded

The Kanada-malja was donated by Canada's Finnish community in 1950 and it was first awarded in 1951 to the champion of the SM-sarja. The first champions were Ilves. The most Kanada-malja champions are held by Tappara, with 21 championships.

=== Engraving ===
From 1951 to 1975, only the name of the club and the year of the championship were engraved into the trophy, but after the establishment of the SM-liiga, players names have been engraved on it. New layers to the trophy have been added two times.

== Past champions ==
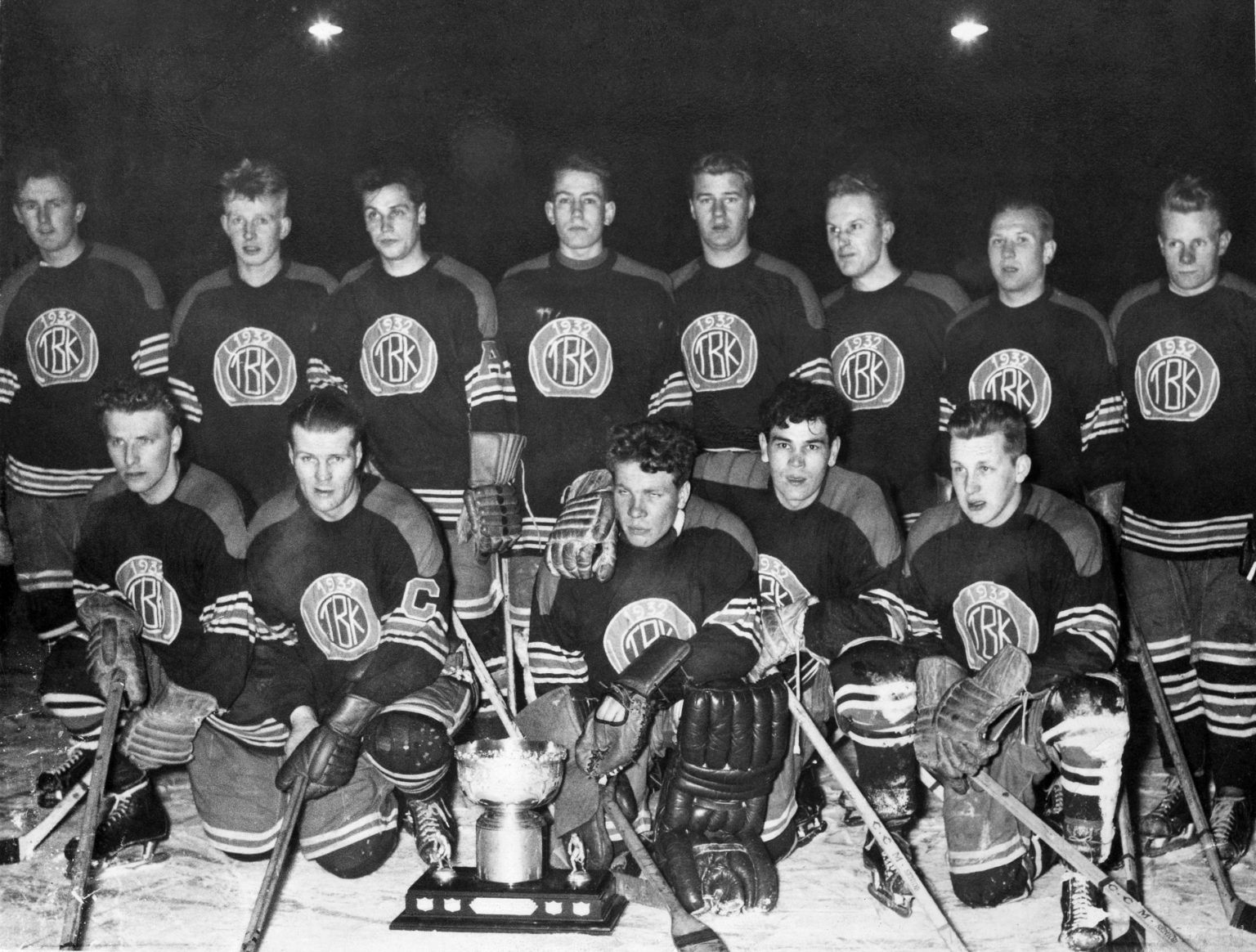
TBK players with the Kanada-malja after winning the championship in the 1954-55 season

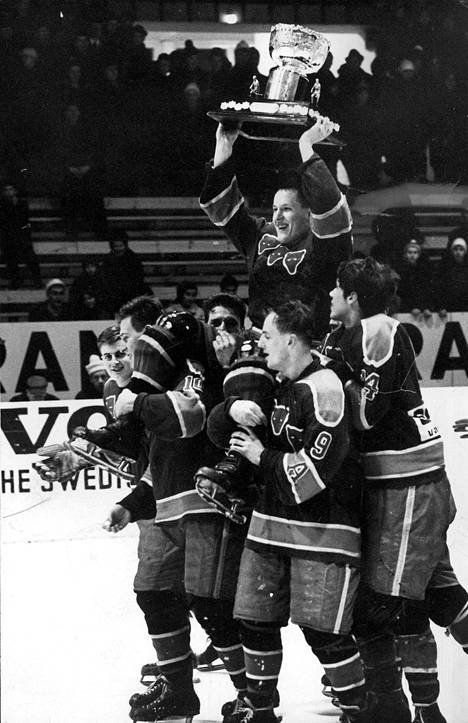
Porin Karhut players holding the Kanada-malja after winning the championship in the 1964-65 season.

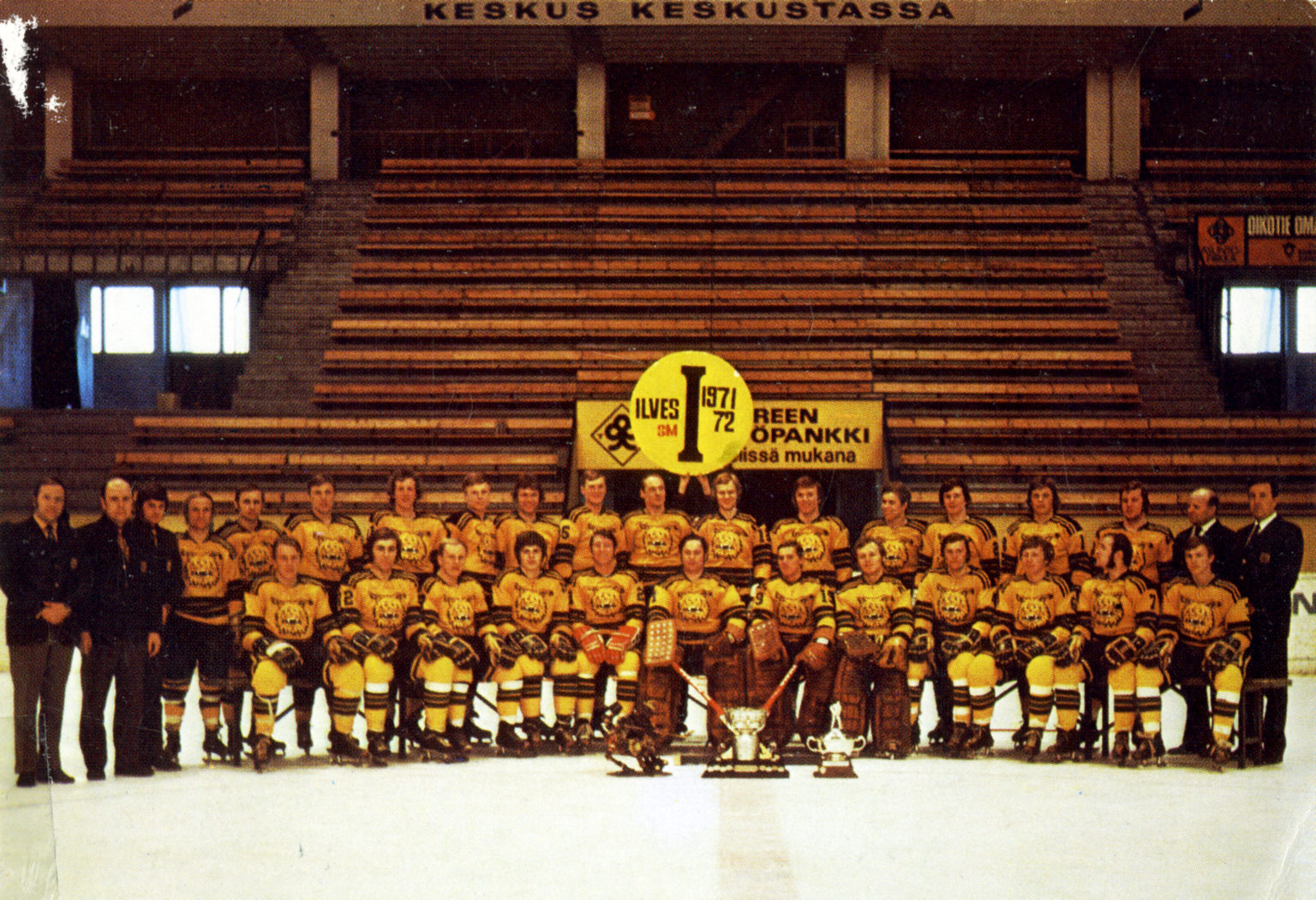
Ilves after becoming Finnish champion in the 1971-72 season

Year	Champion	(silver) Runners-up
1951	Ilves	Tarmo
1952	Ilves	HPK
1953	TBK	Tarmo
1954	TBK	Karhu-Kissat
1955	TBK	TPS
1956	TPS	Tarmo
1957	Ilves	TPS
1958	Ilves	Tappara
1959	Tappara	TK-V
1960	Ilves	Tappara
1961	Tappara	Lukko
1962	Ilves	TK-V
1963	Lukko	Tappara
1964	Tappara	TK-V
1965	Karhut	Ilves
1966	Ilves	Lukko
1967	RU-38	TPS
1968	Koo-Vee	Ilves
1969	HIFK	Ilves
1970	HIFK	Ilves
1971	Ässät	Jokerit
1972	Ilves	HJK
1973	Jokerit	HIFK
1974	HIFK	Tappara
1975	Tappara	HIFK
1976	TPS	Tappara
1977	Tappara	TPS
1978	Ässät	Tappara
1979	Tappara	Ässät
1980	HIFK	Ässät
1981	Kärpät	Tappara
1982	Tappara	TPS
1983	HIFK	Jokerit
1984	Tappara	Ässät
1985	Ilves	TPS
1986	Tappara	HIFK
1987	Tappara	Kärpät
1988	Tappara	Lukko
1989	TPS	JYP
1990	TPS	Ilves
1991	TPS	KalPa
1992	Jokerit	JYP
1993	TPS	HPK
1994	Jokerit	TPS
1995	TPS	Jokerit
1996	Jokerit	TPS
1997	Jokerit	TPS
1998	HIFK	Ilves
1999	TPS	HIFK
2000	TPS	Jokerit
2001	TPS	Tappara
2002	Jokerit	Tappara
2003	Tappara	Kärpät
2004	Kärpät	TPS
2005	Kärpät	Jokerit
2006	HPK	Ässät
2007	Kärpät	Jokerit
2008	Kärpät	Blues
2009	JYP	Kärpät
2010	TPS	HPK
2011	HIFK	Blues
2012	JYP	Pelicans
2013	Ässät	Tappara
2014	Kärpät	Tappara
2015	Kärpät	Tappara
2016	Tappara	HIFK
2017	Tappara	KalPa
2018	Kärpät	Tappara
2019	HPK	Kärpät
2020	Season suspended due to COVID-19.	
2021	Lukko	TPS
2022	Tappara	TPS
2023	Tappara	Pelicans
2024	Tappara	Pelicans
2025	KalPa	SaiPa
2026	Tappara	KooKoo

== Teams by number of wins ==
Team	No. Wins	Last win
Tappara/TBK	21	2026
HC TPS	11	2010
Ilves	9	1985
Kärpät	8	2018
HIFK	7	2011
Jokerit	6	2002
Ässät	3	2013
Lukko	2	2021
HPK	2	2019
JYP	2	2012
KalPa	1	2025
RU-38	1	1967
KOOVEE	1	1968
Karhut	1	1965

== See also ==
- SM-liiga trophies
- List of Finnish ice hockey champions
