= SM-sarja =

Top level of ice hockey in Finland (1928–1975)

SM-Sarja
- Sport: Ice hockey
- Founded: 1928; 98 years ago
- Ceased: 1975; 51 years ago
- Replaced by: SM-Liiga
- No. of teams: 3-12
- Country: Finland
- Level on pyramid: Level 1
- Relegation to: Suomensarja (1936-1974) I-Divisioona (1974-75)

SM-Sarja was the top level of ice hockey in Finland from 1928 to 1975. SM-sarja is a common abbreviation for Suomen mestaruussarja, "Finnish Championship Series".

There was variable number of teams playing for the Finnish championship during the time of SM-sarja. The lowest number of participating teams was during the 1935 SM-sarja season when there was 3 teams. The most common number of participating teams was 12.

Since 1944-45 SM-sarja season there was relegations for lowest-ranking teams of each season. In the relegations the lowest-ranking teams either faced the winner of the 1. Divisioona (1st Division) or was straightly relegated from SM-sarja.

== History ==
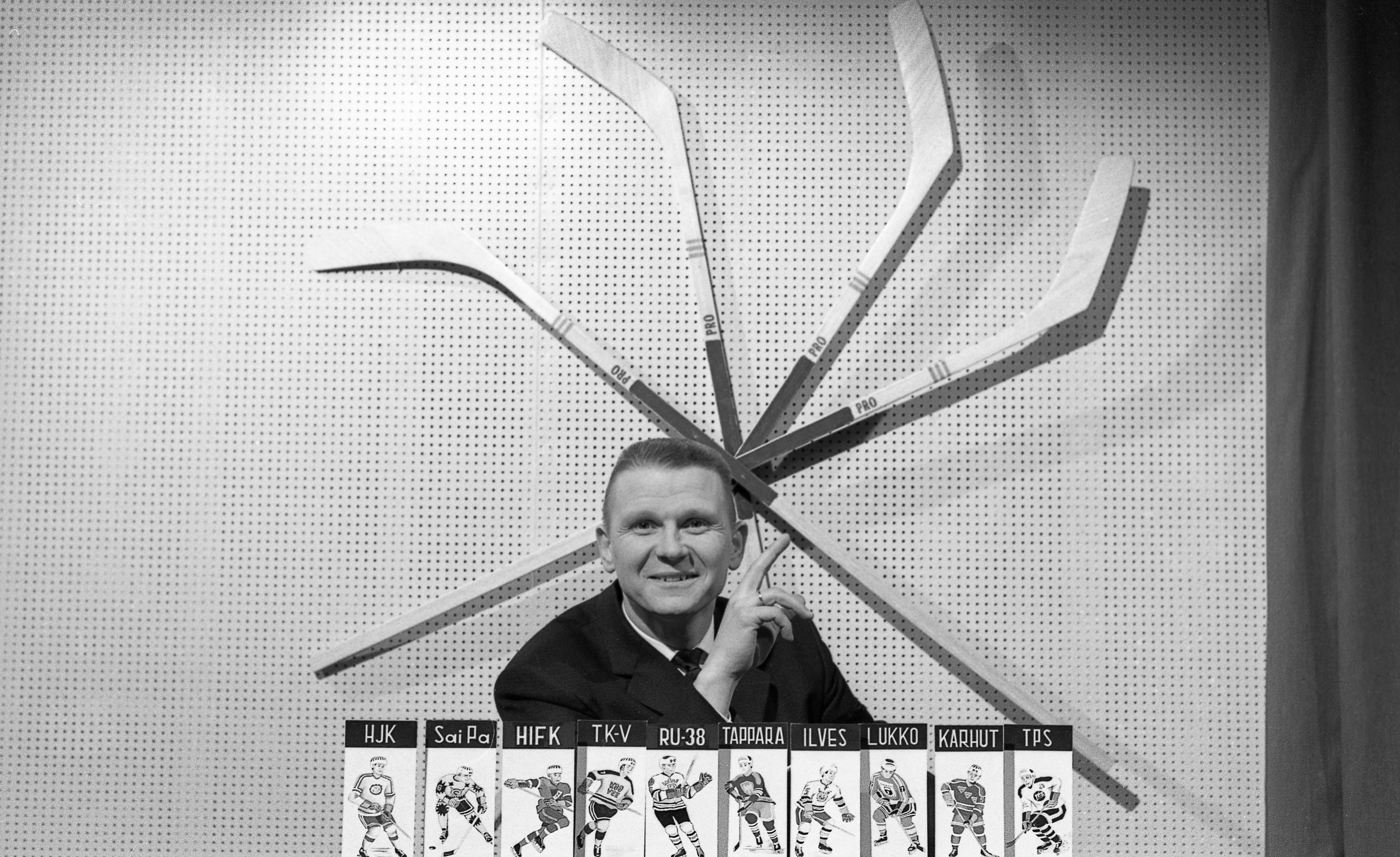
Anssi Koskinen as the host of the Tamvision´s hockey television show Lätkäruutu, 1964

The first SM-sarja season took place in 1928. The first championship was competed as a cup. Viipurin Reipas was the winning team and they became the first Finnish ice hockey champions. SM-sarja was cancelled in 1930 because of bad winter in Finland. SM-sarja was also cancelled in 1940, 1942 and during the 1944 season because of the Winter War and the Continuation War

SM-sarja was played in amateur principles so the clubs were not supposed to pay their players beyond compensation for lost wages. However, as ice hockey evolved in Finland some teams started to be handled like Businesses. In the 1960s, two leading Finnish household machine factories UPO and Rosenlew established their own ice hockey teams, Upon Pallo and Rosenlewin Urheilijat-38. These teams were run by the money of the owning companies and the players were bought from the neighbouring teams. This would be the first steps towards professionalism.

By the 1970s the concept of amateur ice hockey was turning out of date as there was commercials on players uniforms and bigger money involved in teams and in 1975 SM-sarja played its last season and was replaced by SM-liiga (Finnish Championship League) for 1976 season.

The last team to win the Finnish championship under SM-sarja was Tappara.

== Formats ==
Between 1928 and 1933 SM-sarja Championship was contested under Cup rules.

After 1933 SM-sarja was contested as a league. In 1951 SM-sarja was divided to 2 groups and the Play Offs were introduced.

The SM-sarja moved back to one group play in 1959 though the two group-system returned for 1965–66 SM-sarja season.

== SM-sarja teams ==
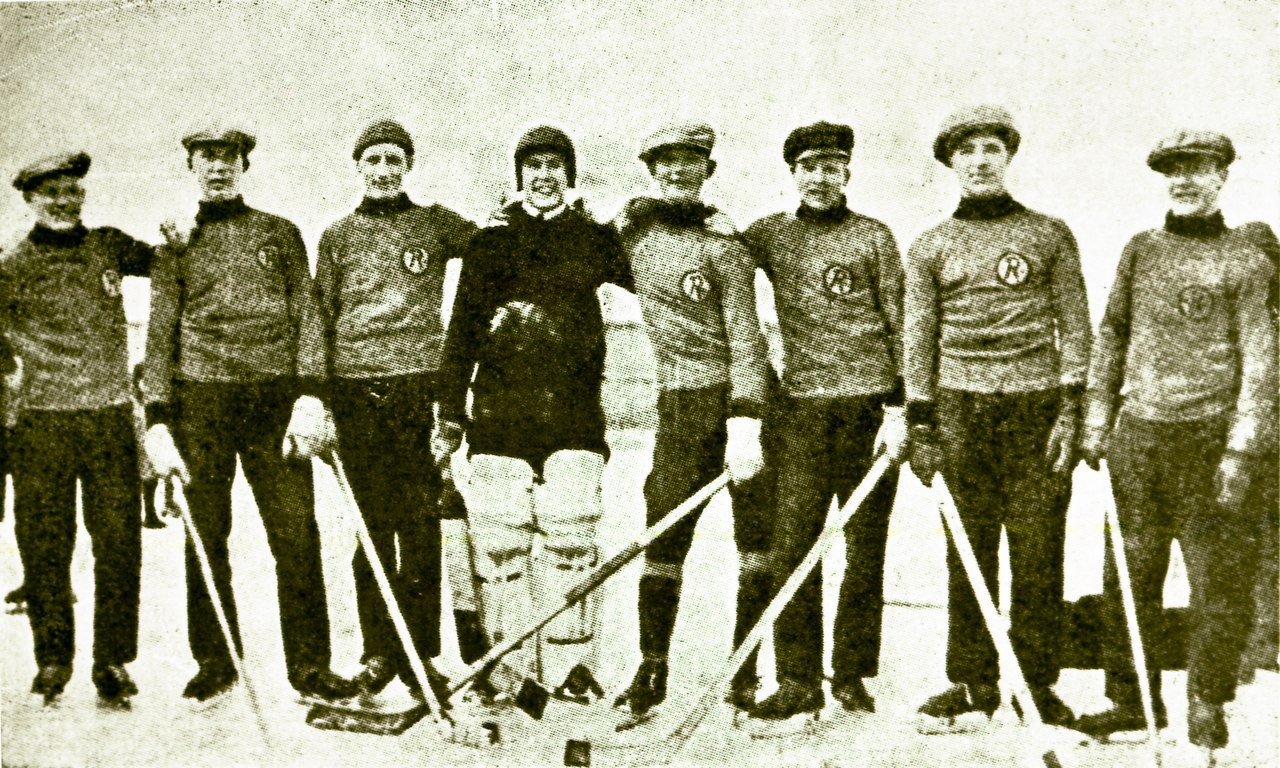
Viipurin Reipas was first Finnish Champions in 1928

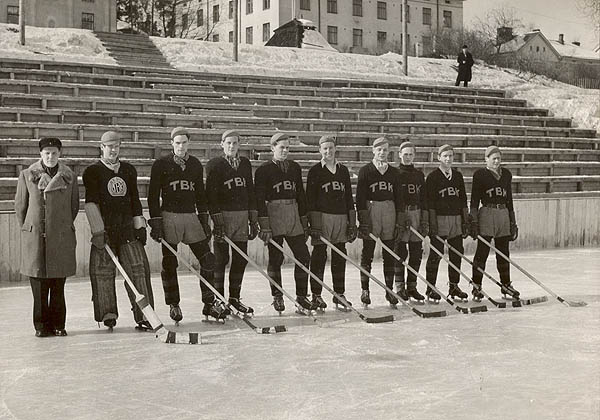
TBK (Tammerfors Bollklubb) in 1945

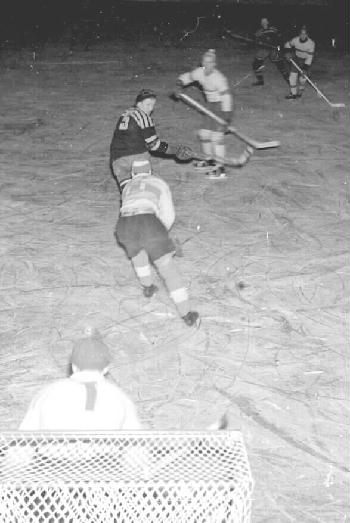
Ilves against HJK in 1949

Teams in bold still play in SM-liiga.

- HPS
- TaPa
- Viipurin Reipas
- HJK
- HJK
- KIF
- **HIFK**
- Tampereen Pyrintö
- ÅIFK
- ViPS
- Turun Riento
- **Ilves**
- HSK
- Tarmo
- **TPS**
- TBK/**Tappara**
- Karhu-Kissat
- TuPK
- Arsenal
- **HPK**
- **Lukko**
- TP-V
- KuPS
- KyPa
- Töölön Vesa/Jokerit
- Jymy-Kiekko
- **KalPa**
- KooVee
- **SaiPa**
- **Kärpät**
- Karhut
- WU
- RU-38
- Lahden Reipas
- TuTo
- SaPKo
- Hermes
- Upon Pallo
- VehU
- **Ässät**
- Hilpara

== Winners ==
Until 1955 the Winner of the SM-sarja received the Aaro Kivilinna memorial award. After 1955 the winner was given the Kanada-malja ("Canada Cup") as the official rotating award of SM-sarja.

year	champions
1928	Viipurin Reipas
1929	HJK
1931	TaPa
1932	HJK
1933	HSK
1934	HSK
1935	HJK
1936	Ilves
1937	Ilves
1938	Ilves
1939	KIF
1941	KIF
1943	KIF
1945	Ilves
1946	Ilves
1947	Ilves
1948	Tarmo
1949	Tarmo
1950	Ilves
1951	Ilves
1952	Ilves
1953	TBK
1954	TBK
1955	TBK
1956	TPS
1957	Ilves
1958	Ilves
1959	Tappara
1960	Ilves
1961	Tappara
1962	Ilves
1963	Lukko
1964	Tappara
1965	Karhut
1966	Ilves
1967	RU-38
1968	KooVee
1969	HIFK
1970	HIFK
1971	Ässät
1972	Ilves
1973	Jokerit
1974	HIFK
1975	Tappara

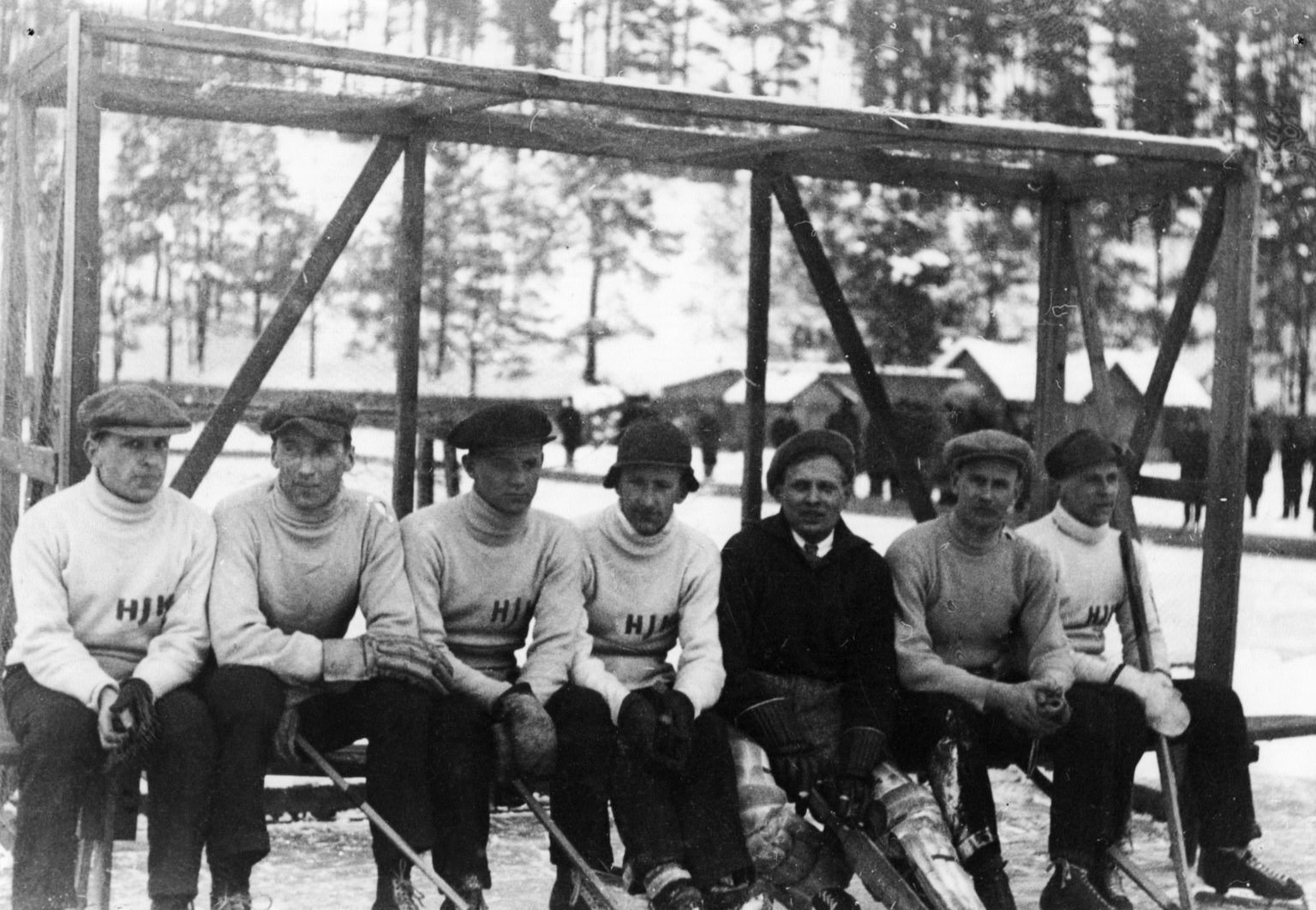
HJK team picture in 1932

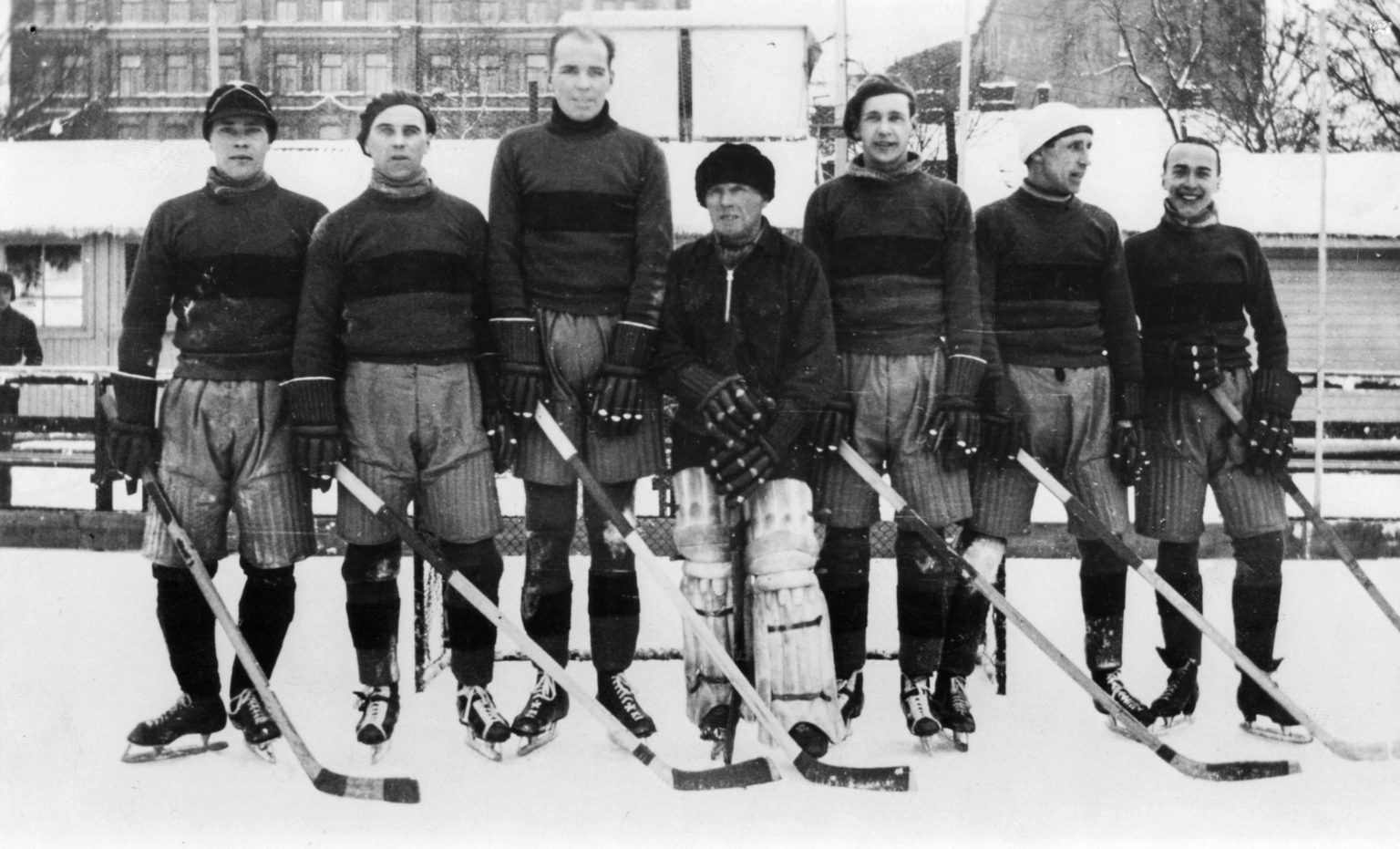
HSK team picture in 1933

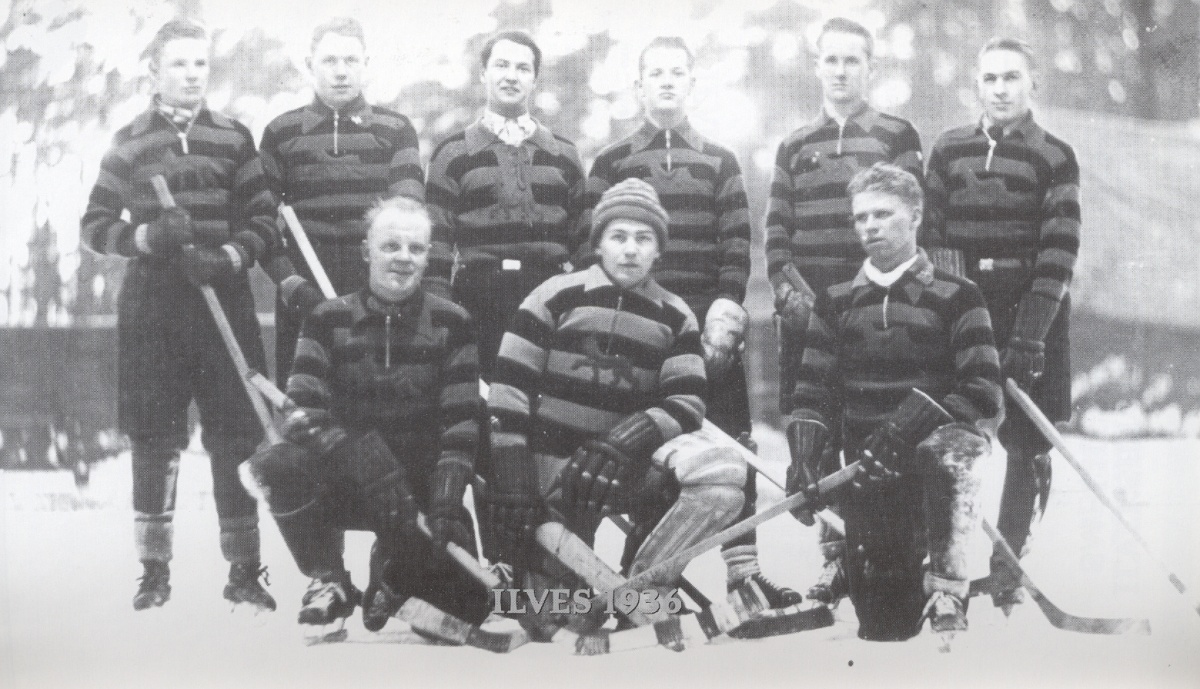
Ilves team picture in 1936

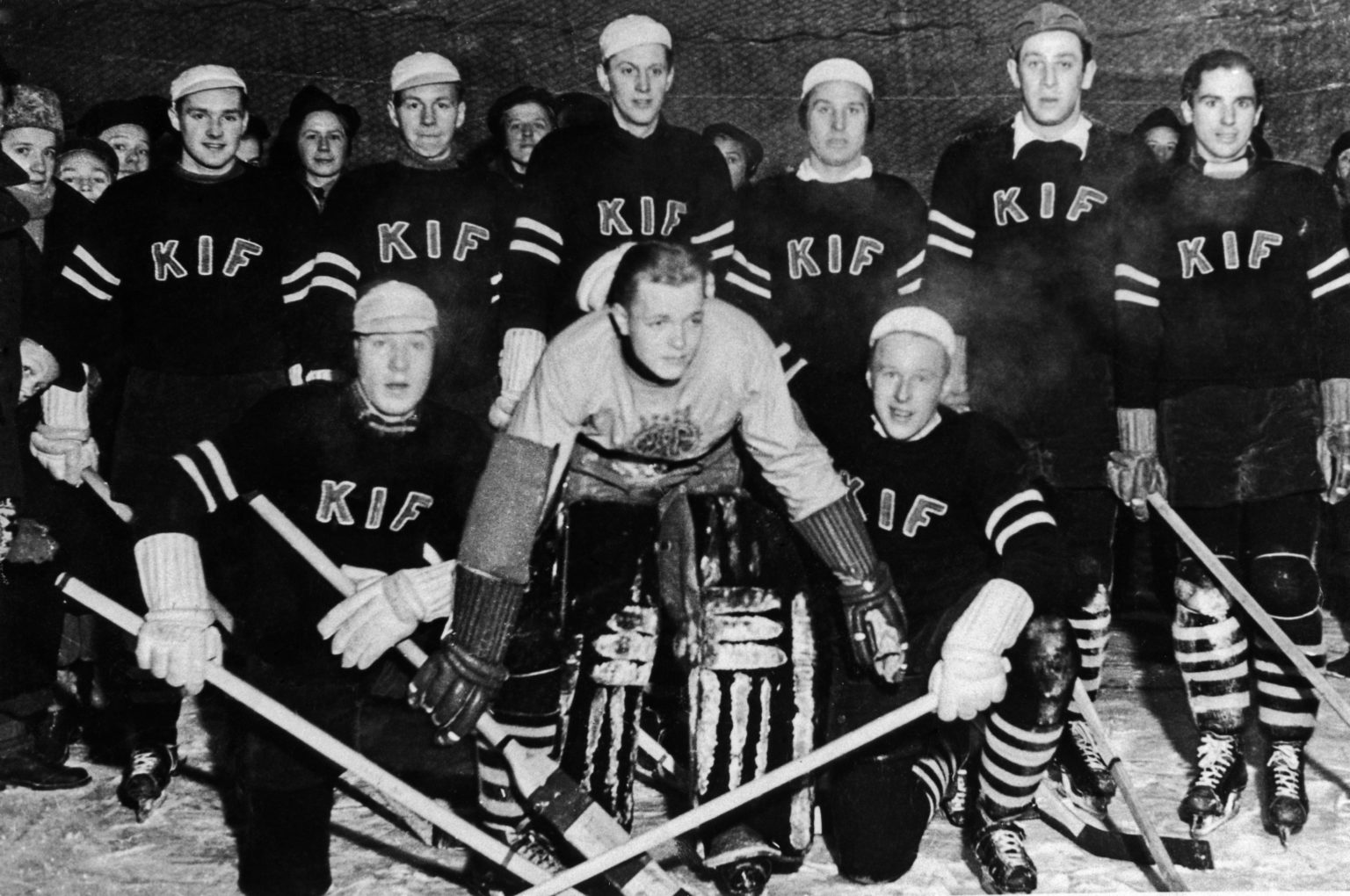
KIF team picture in 1941

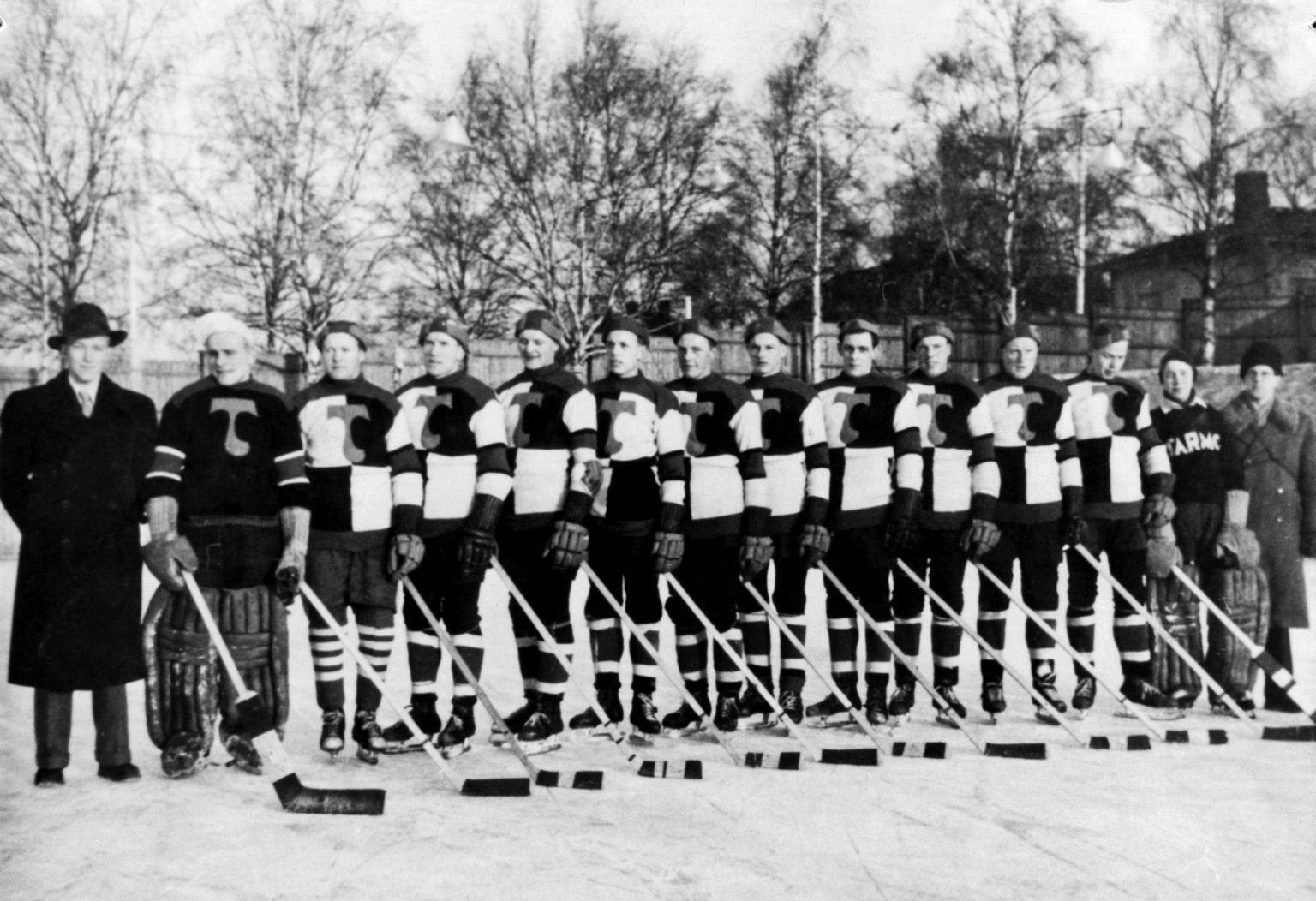
Hämeenlinnan Tarmo team picture in 1949

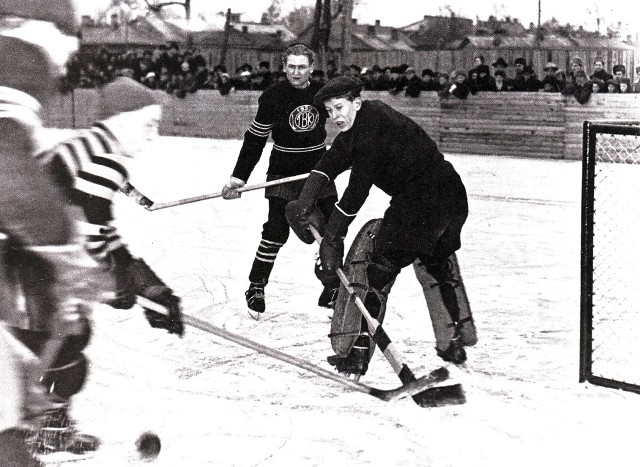
TBK against Ilves in 1949

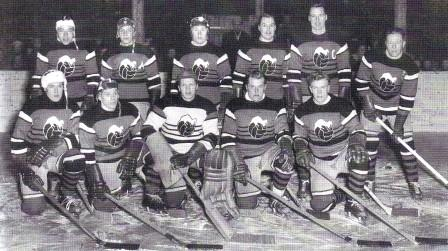
Porin Kärpät team picture in 1956

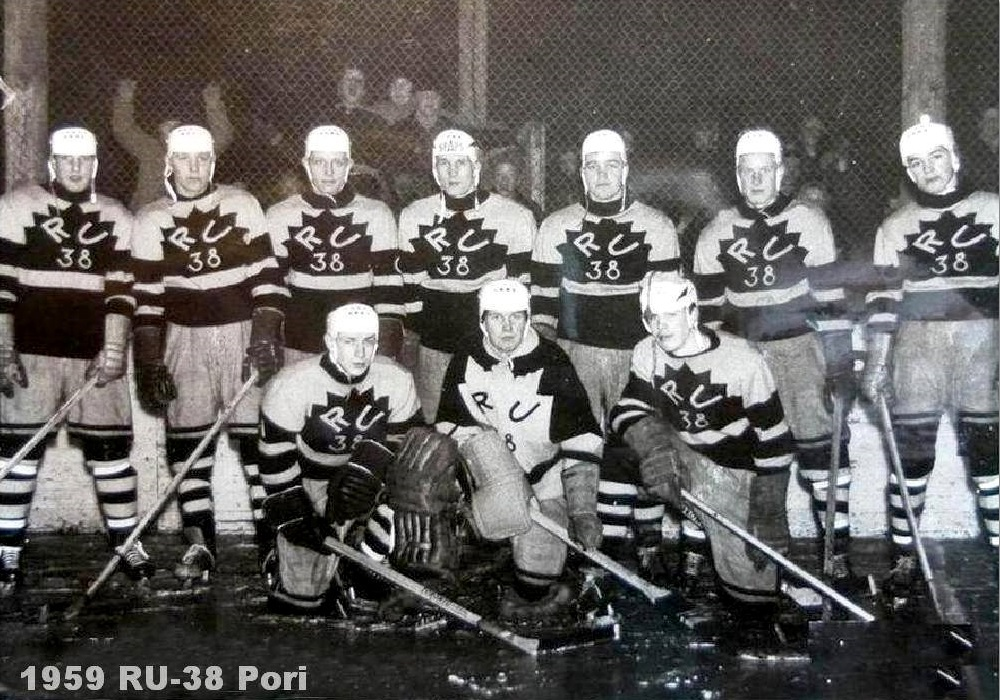
RU-38 team picture in 1959

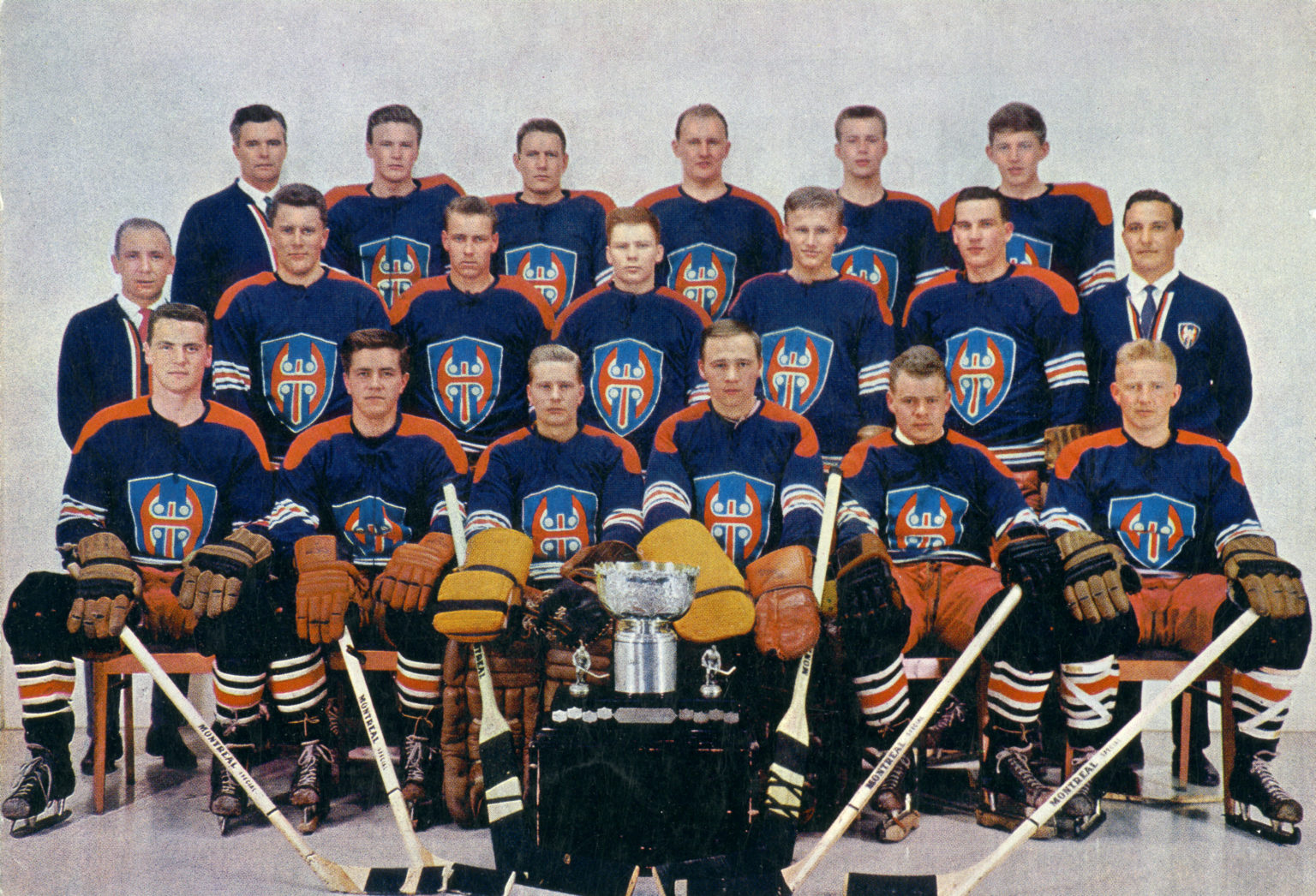
Tappara champion of Finland in 1961

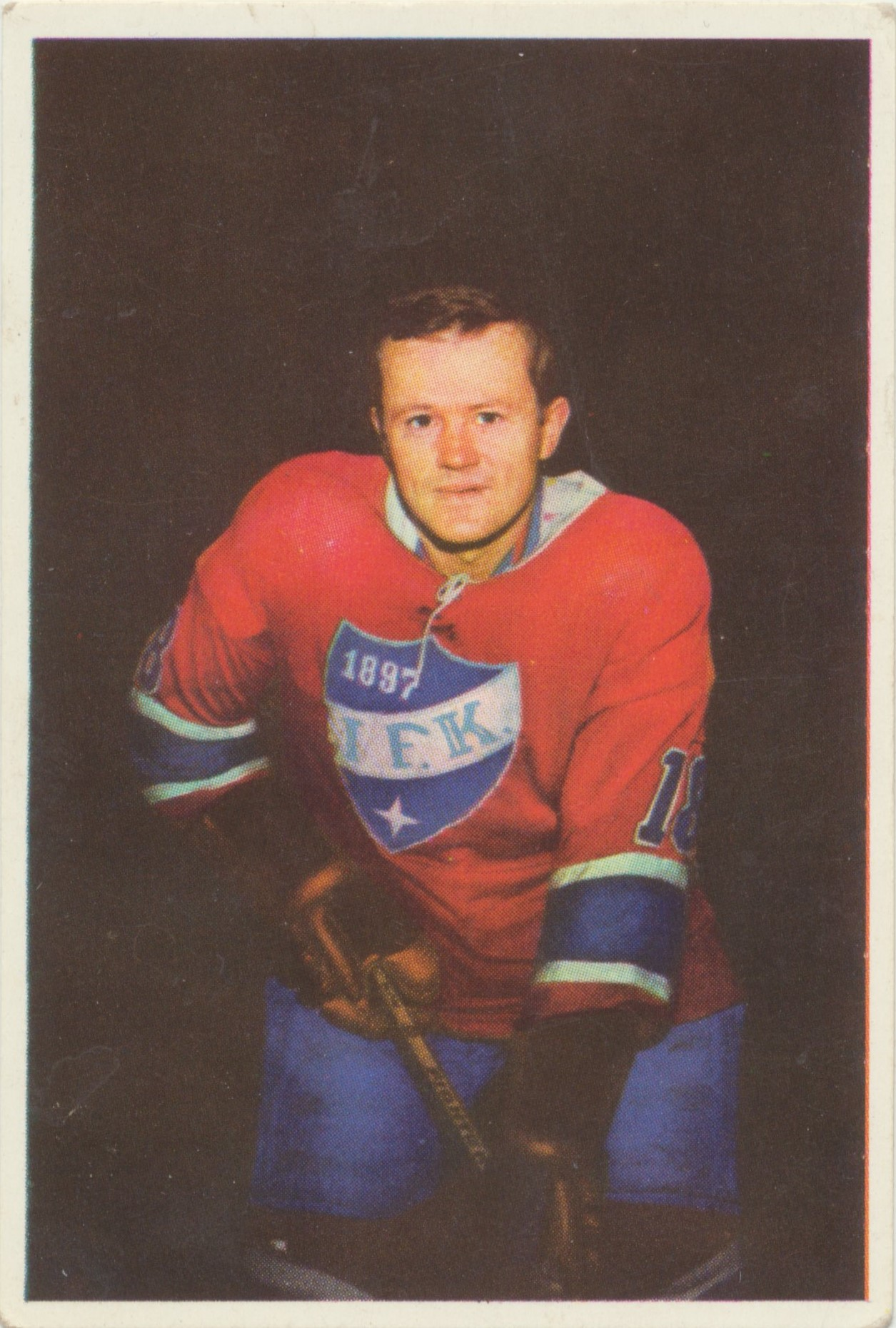
Jerry Sullivan played in Helsinki IFK in 1963

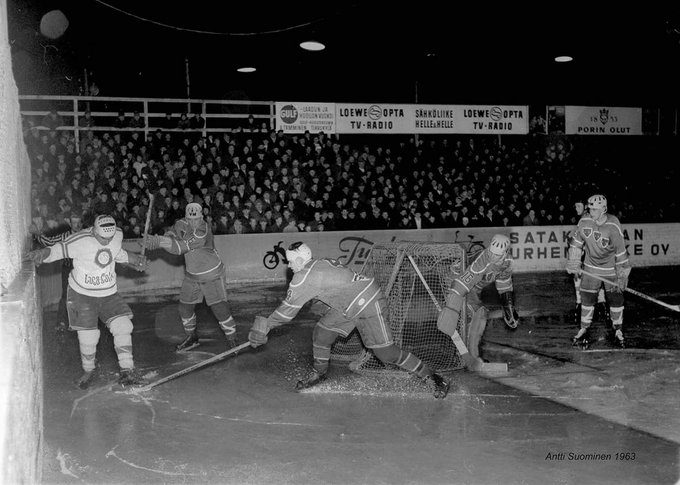
Porin Karhut against HJK in 1963

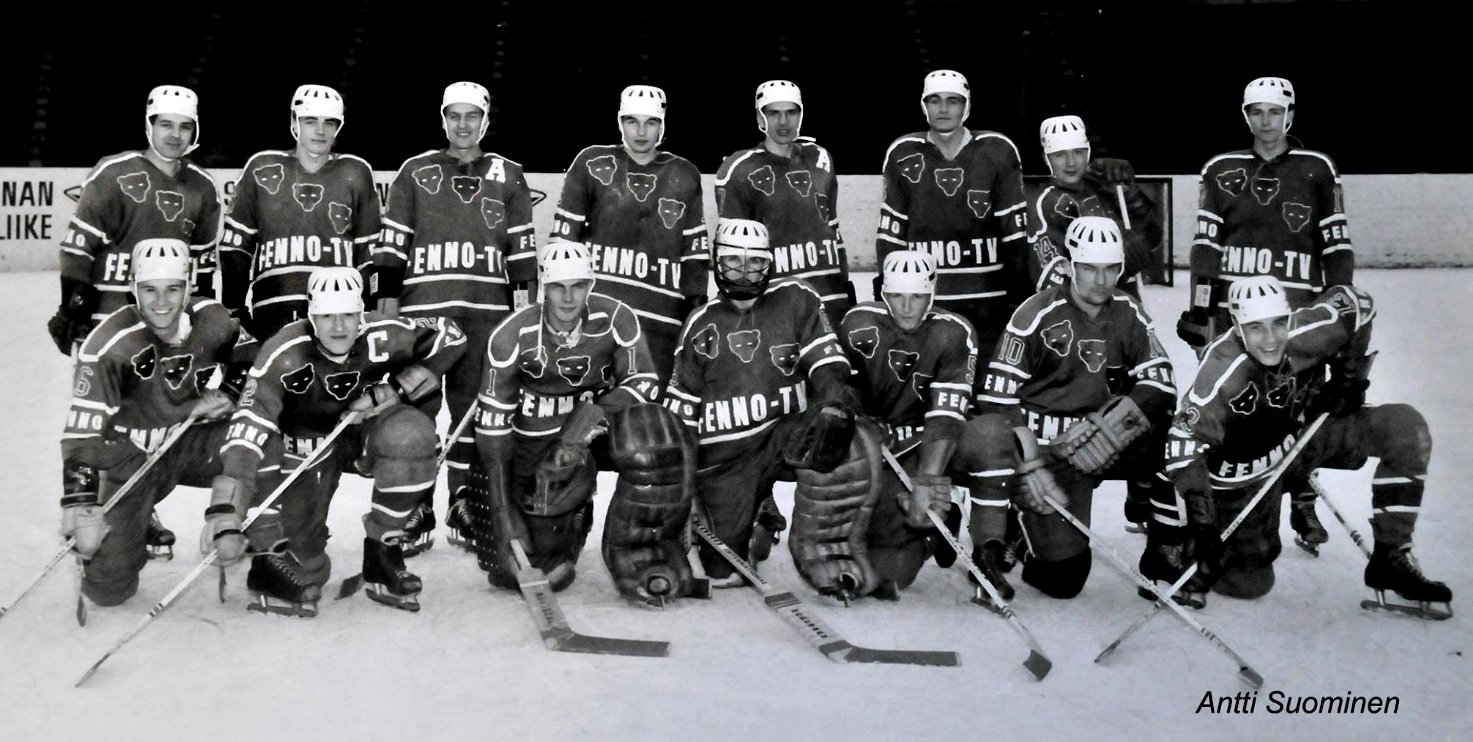
Porin Karhut team picture in 1965

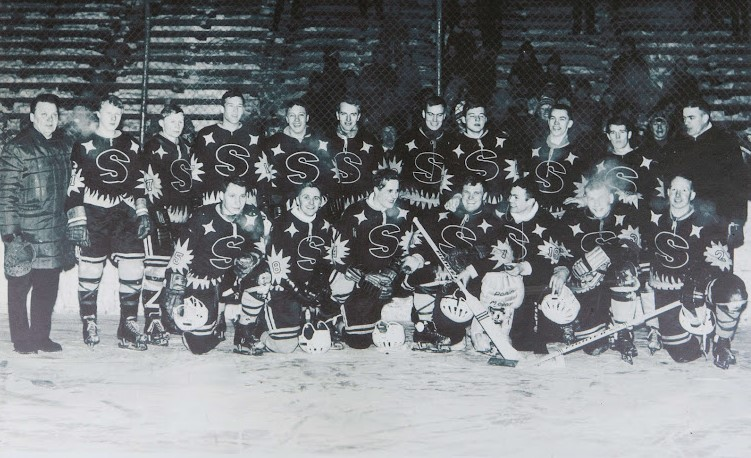
SaiPa team picture in 1966

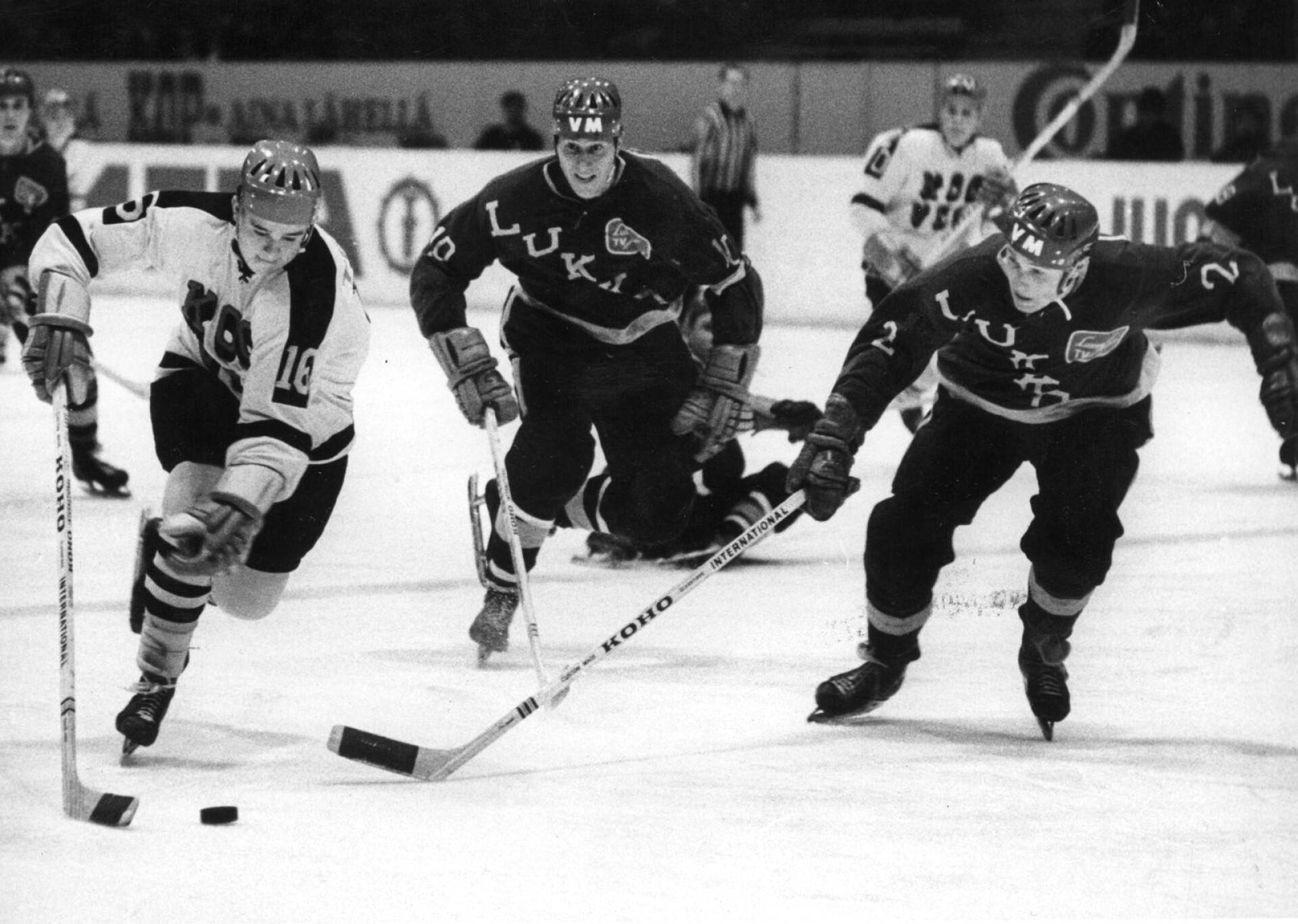
Koovee against Lukko late of 1960s

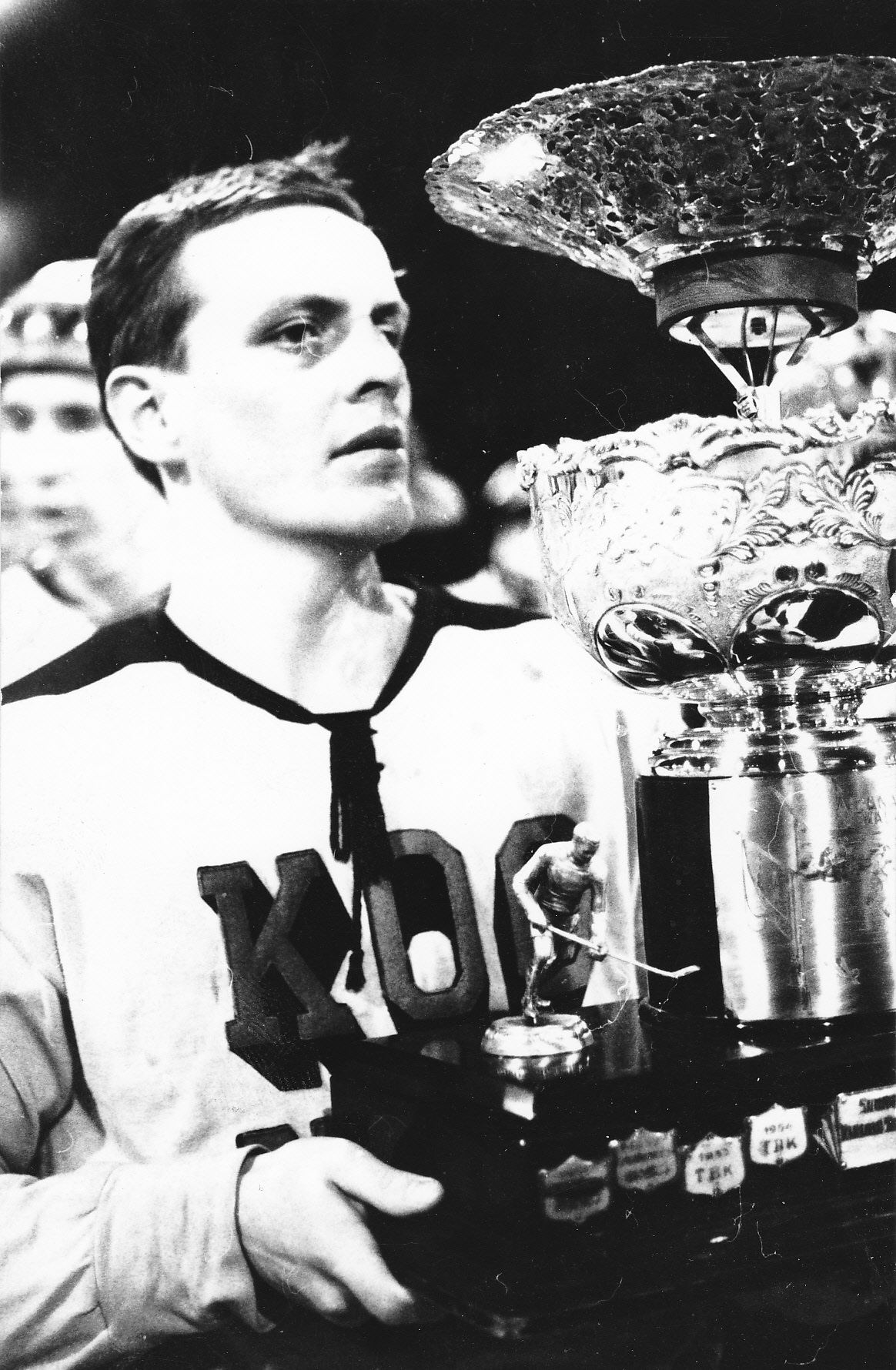
Matti Reunamäki and the Finnish ice hockey championship trophy in 1968

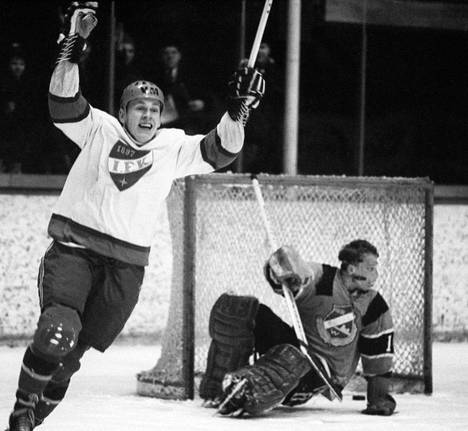
HIFK's Esa Isaksson after scoring a goal against Reipas in 1969.

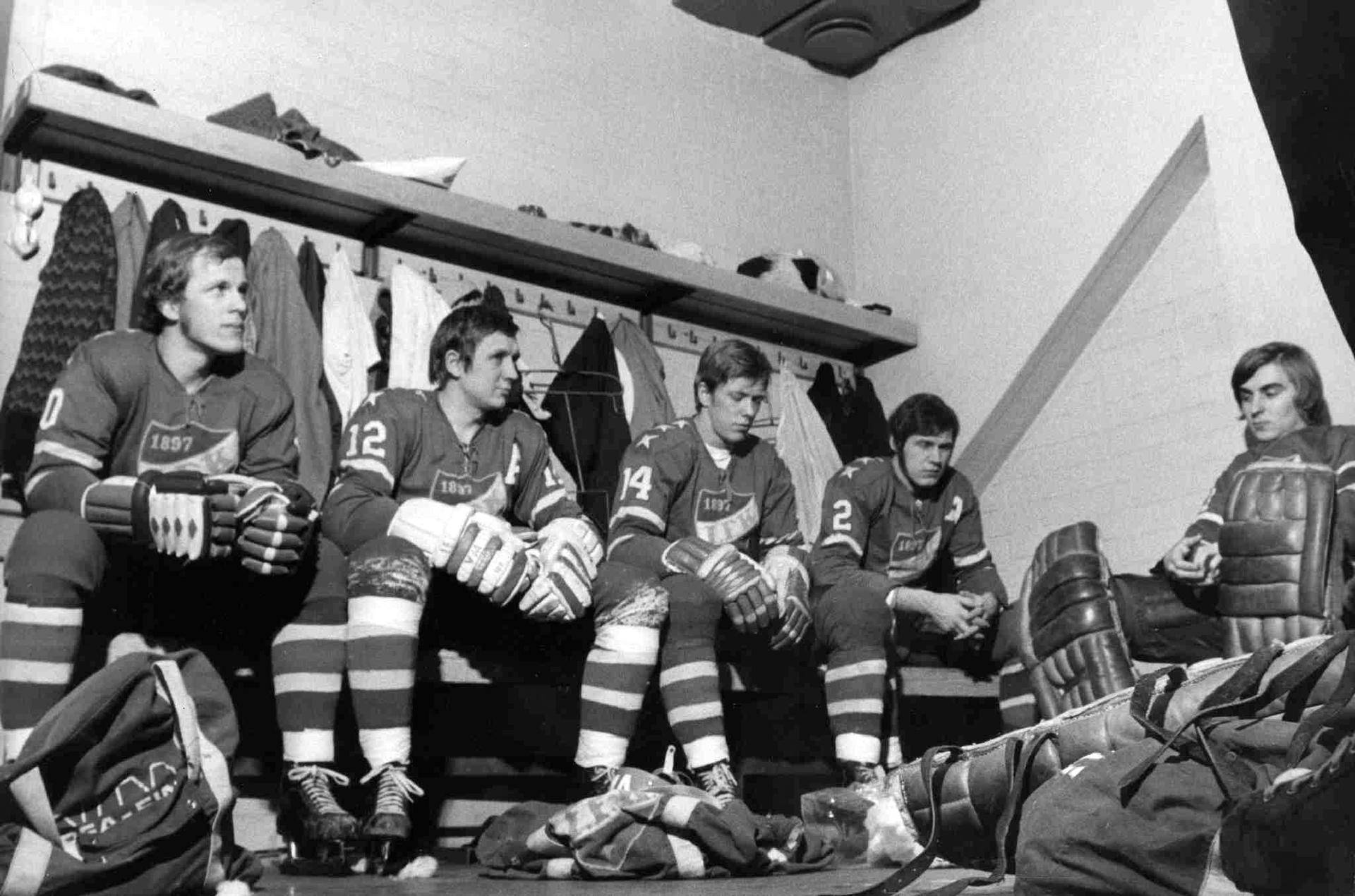
Helsinki IFK players getting ready for a game in 1971

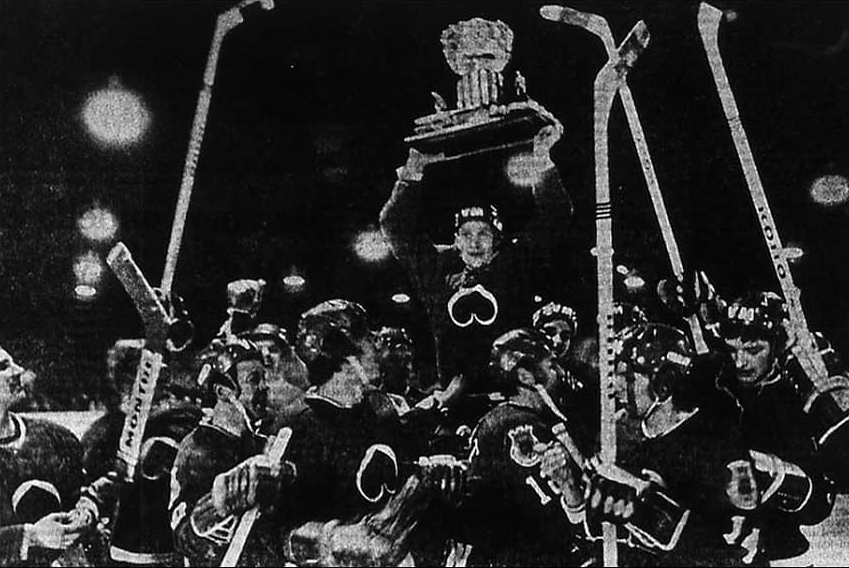
Porin Ässät celebrating the finnish championship of ice hockey in 1971

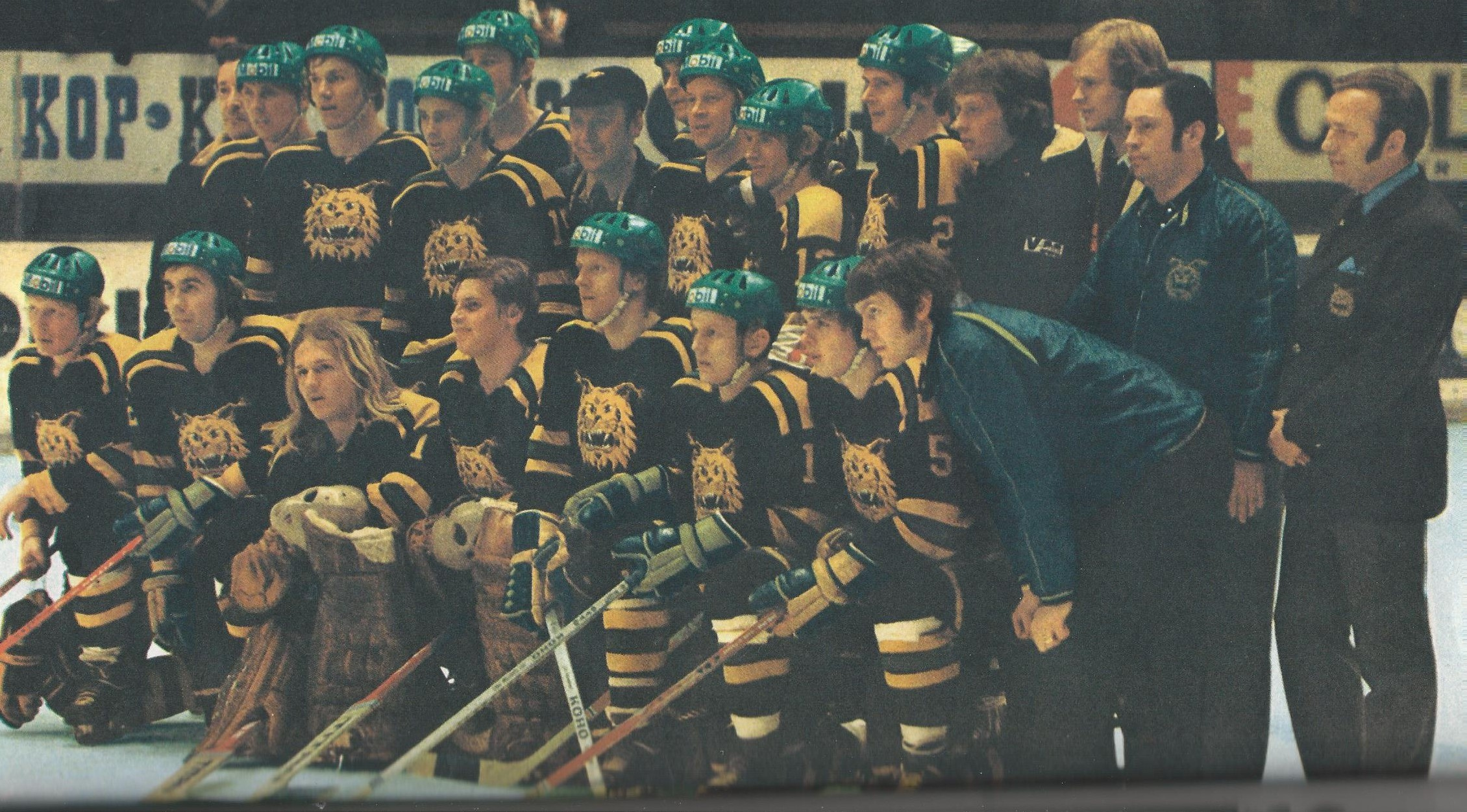
Ilves champion of Finland in 1972

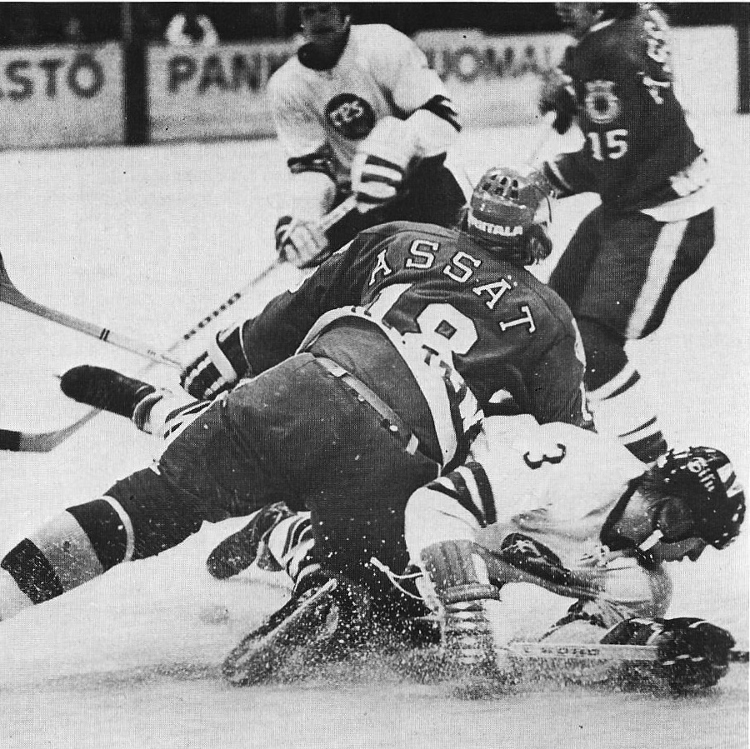
Ässät against TPS in 1973/74 season.

== Notable players ==
- Juhani "Juuso" Wahlsten

== See also ==
- List of Finnish ice hockey champions
