= 1954–55 SM-sarja season =

Finland ice hockey season

The 1954–55 SM-sarja season was the 24th season of the SM-sarja, the top level of ice hockey in Finland. 10 teams participated in the league, and TBK Tampere won the championship.

== Regular season ==
=== Group A ===
	Club	GP	W	T	L	GF–GA	Pts
1.	TBK Tampere	8	7	1	0	50:16	15
2.	HIFK Helsinki	8	4	3	1	41:33	11
3.	HPK Hämeenlinna	8	3	1	4	35:31	7
4.	KyPa Karhula (Kotka)	8	2	0	6	24:53	4
5.	HJK Helsinki	8	1	1	6	24:41	3

Source: Elite Prospects

=== Group B ===
	Club	GP	W	T	L	GF–GA	Pts
1.	TPS Turku	8	6	1	1	45:17	13
2.	TK-V Tampere	8	5	2	1	27:26	12
3.	Karhu-Kissat Helsinki	8	2	2	4	14:22	6
4.	Tarmo Hämeenlinna	8	2	1	5	27:36	5
5.	Lukko Rauma	8	1	2	5	21:33	4

Source: Elite Prospects

== 3rd place ==
- HIFK Helsinki - TK-V Tampere 5:4/9:3

== Finale ==
- TBK Tampere - TPS Turku 5:2/7:4

Preceded by 1953–54 SM-sarja season	SM-sarja season 1954–55	Succeeded by 1955–56 SM-sarja season
