= 1946–47 SM-sarja season =

Finnish ice hockey season

The 1946–47 SM-sarja season was the 16th season of the SM-sarja, the top level of ice hockey in Finland. Nine teams participated in the league, and Ilves Tampere won the championship.

== Regular season ==
	Club	Sp	W	T	L	GF–GA	Pts
1.	Ilves Tampere	8	7	0	1	105:33	14
2.	Tarmo Hämeenlinna	8	7	0	1	102:33	14
3.	TBK Tampere	8	7	0	1	67:34	14
4.	HSK Helsinki	8	4	1	3	44:34	9
5.	TuPK Turku	8	3	0	5	27:50	6
6.	TPS Turku	8	3	0	5	42:76	6
7.	Karhu-Kissat Helsinki	8	2	1	5	33:67	5
8.	HJK Helsinki	8	0	2	6	36:60	2
9.	KIF Helsinki	8	1	0	7	20:79	2

== Final ==
- Ilves Tampere - Tarmo Hämeenlinna 10:2

Preceded by 1945–46 SM-sarja season	SM-sarja season 1946–47	Succeeded by 1947–48 SM-sarja season
