= 1951–52 SM-sarja season =

Finnish ice hockey season

The 1951–52 SM-sarja season was the 21st season of the SM-sarja, the top level of ice hockey in Finland. 10 teams participated in the league, and Ilves Tampere won the championship.

== Regular season ==
=== Group A ===
	Club	Sp	W	T	L	GF–GA	Pts
1.	Ilves Tampere	4	4	0	0	27:13	8
2.	HJK Helsinki	4	2	0	2	17:15	4
3.	TBK Tampere	4	2	0	2	15:13	4
4.	HIFK Helsinki	4	1	0	3	18:20	2
5.	Pyrkivä Turku	4	1	0	3	5:21	2

Source: Elite Prospects

=== Group B ===
	Club	Sp	W	T	L	GF–GA	Pts
1.	HPK Hämeenlinna	4	4	0	0	23:3	8
2.	Tarmo Hämeenlinna	4	3	0	1	32:8	6
3.	Lukko Rauma	4	1	1	2	14:25	3
4.	Karhu-Kissat Helsinki	4	1	0	3	10:14	2
5.	KIF Helsinki	4	0	1	3	8:37	1

Source: Elite Prospects

== 3rd place ==
- HJK Helsinki - Tarmo Hämeenlinna 3:8/1:7

== Final ==
- HPK Hämeenlinna - Ilves Tampere 1:6/3:4

Preceded by 1950–51 SM-sarja season	SM-sarja season 1951–52	Succeeded by 1952–53 SM-sarja season
