= 1944–45 SM-sarja season =

Finnish ice hockey season

The 1944–45 SM-sarja season was the 14th season of the SM-sarja, the top level of ice hockey in Finland. Nine teams participated in the league, and Ilves Tampere won the championship.

== Regular season ==
	Club	Sp	W	T	L	GF–GA	Pts
1.	Ilves Tampere	8	6	2	0	28:10	14
2.	Tarmo Hämeenlinna	8	6	1	1	28:11	13
3.	KIF Helsinki	8	6	0	2	38:19	12
4.	TPS Turku	8	5	1	2	27:17	11
5.	HSK Helsinki	8	2	3	3	18:22	7
6.	HJK Helsinki	8	2	2	4	19:23	6
7.	ÅIFK Turku	8	2	1	5	14:38	5
8.	TBK Tampere	8	1	0	7	16:27	2
9.	Karhu-Kissat Helsinki	8	1	0	7	10:31	2

Preceded by 1943–44 SM-sarja season (stopped)	SM-sarja season 1944–45	Succeeded by 1945–46 SM-sarja season
