= 1949–50 SM-sarja season =

Ice hockey season in Finland

The 1949–50 SM-sarja season was the 19th season of the SM-sarja, the top level of ice hockey in Finland. Eight teams participated in the league, and Ilves Tampere won the championship.

== Team ==
Field players:
PP	Name	GP	Goal	Pts	Goal+Assists	PIM
h	Aarne Honkavaara	7	11	10	21	0 min
h	Lotfi Nasib	7	8	9	17	4 min
h	Kalle Havulinna	7	6	6	12	4 min
h	Yrjö Hakala	7	6	3	9	2 min
h	Eero Saari	7	7	2	9	4 min
h	Osmo Huhti	7	6	1	7	0 min
h	Tero Jaakkola	6	4	3	7	0 min
h	Jukka Wuolio	6	1	2	3	2 min
p	Pentti Isotalo	6	1	0	1	2 min
p	Teuvo Hellen	7	0	1	1	2 min
p	Ossi Kauppi	4	0	1	1	0 min
h	Kauko Mäkinen	1	0	0	0	0 min

Goalkeepers:
Name	PO	GP	Goal	Pts	Goal+Assists	PIM
Juhani Linkosuo	7	7	0	0	0	0 min

== Regular season ==
	Club	Sp	W	T	L	GF–GA	Pts
1.	Ilves Tampere	7	7	0	0	50:18	14
2.	Tarmo Hämeenlinna	7	6	0	1	41:16	12
3.	TBK Tampere	7	5	0	2	45:22	10
4.	HIFK Helsinki	7	3	0	4	39:37	6
5.	HJK Helsinki	7	3	0	4	29:41	6
6.	KIF Helsinki	7	2	0	5	24:55	4
7.	HPK Hämeenlinna	7	1	1	5	31:42	3
8.	TuPK Turku	7	0	1	6	22:50	1

Preceded by 1948–49 SM-sarja season	SM-sarja season 1949–50	Succeeded by 1950–51 SM-sarja season
