= 1952–53 SM-sarja season =

Finnish ice hockey season

The 1952–53 SM-sarja season was the 22nd season of the SM-sarja, the top level of ice hockey in Finland. 12 teams participated in the league, and TBK Tampere won the championship.

== Regular season ==
=== Group A ===
| | Club | Sp | W | T | L | GF–GA | Pts |
|---|---|---|---|---|---|---|---|
| 1. | Tarmo Hämeenlinna | 10 | 9 | 1 | 0 | 67:19 | 19 |
| 2. | HIFK Helsinki | 10 | 8 | 1 | 1 | 56:33 | 17 |
| 3. | Ilves Tampere | 10 | 4 | 2 | 4 | 35:38 | 10 |
| 4. | Karhu-Kissat Helsinki | 10 | 4 | 1 | 5 | 28:30 | 9 |
| 5. | Lukko Rauma | 10 | 2 | 0 | 8 | 29:47 | 4 |
| 6. | Pyrkivä Turku | 10 | 0 | 1 | 9 | 23:71 | 1 |

Source: Elite Prospects

=== Group B ===
| | Club | Sp | W | T | L | GF–GA | Pts |
|---|---|---|---|---|---|---|---|
| 1. | TBK Tampere | 10 | 7 | 2 | 1 | 52:23 | 16 |
| 2. | TPS Turku | 10 | 7 | 0 | 3 | 53:38 | 14 |
| 3. | HPK Hämeenlinna | 10 | 6 | 0 | 4 | 44:32 | 12 |
| 4. | HJK Helsinki | 10 | 4 | 1 | 5 | 30:27 | 9 |
| 5. | TP-V Tampere | 10 | 3 | 1 | 6 | 30:41 | 7 |
| 6. | KIF Helsinki | 10 | 1 | 0 | 9 | 30:78 | 2 |

Source: Elite Prospects

== 3rd place ==
- TPS Turku – HIFK Helsinki 10:6/4:3

== Final ==
- TBK Tampere – Tarmo Hämeenlinna 5:4/3:2

| Preceded by 1951–52 SM-sarja season | SM-sarja season 1952–53 | Succeeded by 1953–54 SM-sarja season |
