= 1943–44 SM-sarja season =

Finnish ice hockey season

The 1943–1944 SM-sarja season was stopped mid-season cause of the Continuation War.

This would be the last SM-sarja/SM-liiga season which had to be cancelled pre- or mid-season until 2020.

== SM-sarja Championship ==
SM-sarja	GP	W	T	L	Pts	GF	GA
TPS Turku	7	5	1	1	11	29	8
Tarmo Hämeenlinna	7	4	1	2	9	22	18
Ilves Tampere	5	3	2	0	8	27	3
HJK Helsinki	4	1	2	1	4	6	11
KIF Helsinki	3	1	1	1	3	7	8
HSK Helsinki	4	1	0	3	2	4	21
Karhu-Kissat Helsinki	5	0	1	3	1	6	22
TBK Tampere	5	0	0	4	0	1	11

The season was stopped in the middle of it. Therefore, the standings are the situation from the moment of cancellation.
The result between Karhu-Kissat and TBK is not included on the scoreboard but the match is counted on.

The match between TPS and Ilves was stopped cause of an air alert. On February 6, the match between Karhu-Kissat and TBK at Helsinki was stopped because the hockey field was bombed. As a result, a Karhu-Kissat's player was injured and never played hockey again. Bombing of Helsinki had started. Ilves wished to play the two games remaining at their hometown to claim the title. However, the night of 26–27 February, the Helsinki-Tampere road was destroyed by bombardment and the championship stopped permanently.

Preceded by 1942–43 SM-sarja season	SM-sarja season 1943–44	Succeeded by 1944–45 SM-sarja season
