= 1940–41 SM-sarja season =

Finnish ice hockey season

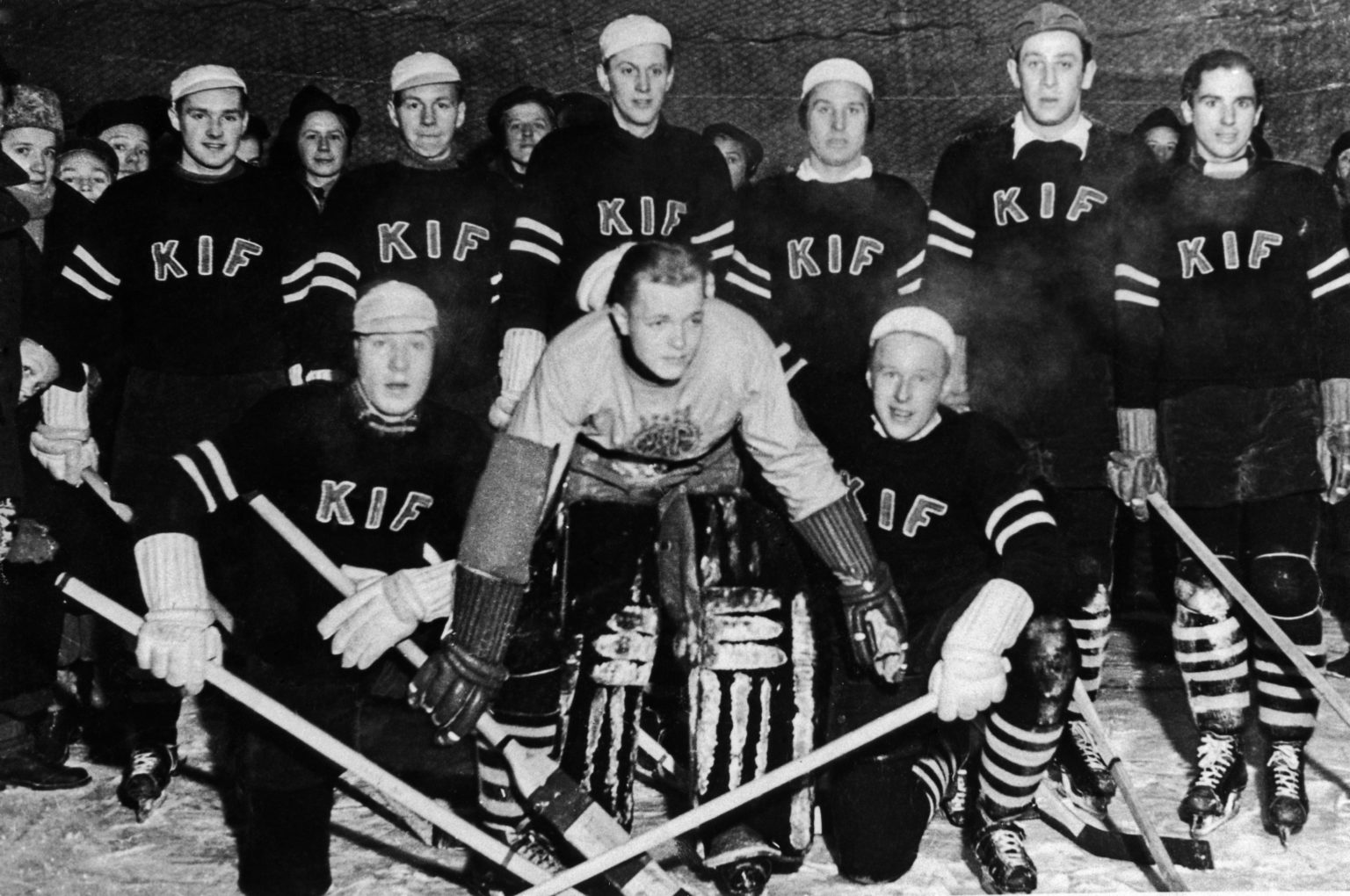

The 1940–1941 SM-sarja season was played between 8 teams from 4 cities. Each team played 7 games.

== SM-Sarja championship ==
SM-sarja	GP	W	T	L	Pts	GF	GA
KIF Helsinki	7	6	1	0	13	35	11
HJK Helsinki	7	6	0	1	12	32	6
Ilves Tampere	7	3	2	2	8	16	14
Tarmo Hämeenlinna	7	4	0	3	8	18	21
HSK Helsinki	7	3	1	3	7	10	15
ÅIFK Turku	7	1	2	4	4	14	21
Riento Turku	7	2	0	5	4	8	27
TPS Turku	7	0	0	7	0	5	23

KIF Wins the 1940–1941 SM-sarja championship.

Preceded by 1939–40 SM-sarja season	SM-sarja season 1940–41	Succeeded by 1941–42 SM-sarja season
