= 1950–51 SM-sarja season =

Finnish ice hockey season

The 1950–51 SM-sarja season was the 20th season of the SM-sarja, the top level of ice hockey in Finland. 10 teams participated in the league, and Ilves Tampere won the championship.

== Regular season ==
=== Group A ===
	Club	GP	W	T	L	GF–GA	Pts
1.	Ilves Tampere	8	8	0	0	66:9	16
2.	HJK Helsinki	8	4	1	3	42:28	9
3.	Lukko Rauma	8	3	2	3	31:40	8
4.	HIFK Helsinki	8	2	2	4	27:41	6
5.	TP-V Tampere	8	0	1	7	17:65	1

Source: Elite Prospects

=== Group B ===
	Club	Sp	W	T	L	GF–GA	Pts
1.	Tarmo Hämeenlinna	8	7	1	0	54:14	15
2.	TBK Tampere	8	5	2	1	43:31	12
3.	Karhu-Kissat Helsinki	8	2	1	5	25:30	5
4.	KIF Helsinki	8	2	1	5	31:48	5
5.	TK-V Tampere	8	1	1	6	24:54	3

Source: Elite Prospects

== 3rd place ==
- HJK Helsinki - TBK Tampere 2:2/1:8

== Final ==
- Ilves Tampere - Tarmo Hämeenlinna 1:1/4:3

Preceded by 1949–50 SM-sarja season	SM-sarja season 1950–51	Succeeded by 1951–52 SM-sarja season
