= 1955–56 SM-sarja season =

Finnish ice hockey season

The 1955–56 SM-sarja season was the 25th season of the SM-sarja, the top level of ice hockey in Finland. 10 teams participated in the league, and TPS Turku won the championship.

== Regular season ==
=== Group A ===
	Club	GP	W	T	L	GF–GA	Pts
1.	TPS Turku	8	6	0	2	31:28	12
2.	Ilves Tampere	8	4	0	4	26:22	8
3.	TK-V Tampere	8	4	0	4	22:28	6
4.	HPK Hämeenlinna	8	3	0	5	28:37	6
5.	HIFK Helsinki	8	3	0	5	34:26	6

Source: Elite Prospects

==== 4th place ====
- HPK Hämeenlinna - HIFK Helsinki 7:4

=== Group B ===
	Club	GP	W	T	L	GF–GA	Pts
1.	Tarmo Hämeenlinna	8	7	0	1	37:23	14
2.	Tappara Tampere	8	6	1	1	35:21	13
3.	Karhu-Kissat Helsinki	8	4	1	3	23:17	9
4.	Vesa Helsinki	8	1	0	7	15:32	2
5.	KyPa Karhula (Kotka)	8	1	0	7	18:35	2

Source: Elite Prospects

==== 4th place ====
- Vesa Helsinki - KyPa Karhula 3:2

== 3rd place ==
- Tappara Tampere - Ilves Tampere 5:2/2:2

== Final ==
- TPS Turku - Tarmo Hämeenlinna 7:2/9:3

Preceded by 1954–55 SM-sarja season	SM-sarja season 1955–56	Succeeded by 1956–57 SM-sarja season
