= 1942–43 SM-sarja season =

Finnish ice hockey season

The 1942–1943 SM-sarja season of the Finnish Elite League(SM-sarja) took place even though the Continuation War continued on. The season featured 8 teams from 4 cities. Teams played 7 games each.

== SM-sarja championship ==
SM-sarja	GP	W	T	L	Pts	GF	GA
KIF Helsinki	7	6	1	0	13	27	8
TPS Turku	7	5	1	1	11	23	9
Ilves Tampere	7	4	2	1	10	26	7
HSK Helsinki	7	3	1	3	7	20	17
HJK Helsinki	7	3	0	4	6	11	14
TBK Tampere	7	1	1	5	3	6	21
Karhu-Kissat Helsinki	7	1	1	5	3	3	21
Tarmo Hämeenlinna	7	1	1	5	3	10	29

KIF won the 1942–1943 SM-sarja championship.

Preceded by 1941–42 SM-sarja season	SM-sarja season 1942–43	Succeeded by 1943–44 SM-sarja season (stopped)
