= 1947–48 SM-sarja season =

Finnish ice hockey season

The 1947–48 SM-sarja season was the 17th season of the SM-sarja, the top level of ice hockey in Finland. Seven teams participated in the league, and Tarmo Hameenlinna won the championship.

== Regular season ==
	Club	Sp	W	T	L	GF–GA	Pts
1.	Tarmo Hämeenlinna	6	6	0	0	52:12	12
2.	Ilves Tampere	6	4	0	2	77:19	8
3.	TBK Tampere	6	4	0	2	41:24	8
4.	HSK Helsinki	6	4	0	2	34:24	8
5.	TuPK Turku	6	2	0	4	21:52	4
6.	Åbo IFK	6	1	0	5	25:57	2
7.	TPS Turku	6	0	0	6	12:74	0

Source: Elite Prospects

Preceded by 1946–47 SM-sarja season	SM-sarja season 1947–48	Succeeded by 1948–49 SM-sarja season
