= 1957–58 SM-sarja season =

Finnish ice hockey season

The 1957–58 SM-sarja season was the 27th season of the SM-sarja, the top level of ice hockey in Finland. 10 teams participated in the league, and Ilves Tampere won the championship.

== Regular season ==
=== Group A ===
| | Club | GP | W | T | L | GF–GA | Pts |
|---|---|---|---|---|---|---|---|
| 1. | Ilves Tampere | 8 | 6 | 0 | 2 | 66:27 | 12 |
| 2. | Tarmo Hämeenlinna | 8 | 4 | 1 | 3 | 37:33 | 9 |
| 3. | KalPa Kuopio | 8 | 4 | 1 | 3 | 36:42 | 9 |
| 4. | HJK Helsinki | 8 | 4 | 0 | 4 | 29:31 | 8 |
| 5. | Vesa Helsinki | 8 | 1 | 0 | 7 | 26:61 | 2 |

Source: Elite Prospects

=== Group B ===
| | Club | GP | W | T | L | GF–GA | Pts |
|---|---|---|---|---|---|---|---|
| 1. | Tappara Tampere | 8 | 6 | 1 | 1 | 59:22 | 13 |
| 2. | TPS Turku | 8 | 3 | 2 | 3 | 43:39 | 8 |
| 3. | HPK Hämeenlinna | 8 | 3 | 2 | 3 | 41:46 | 8 |
| 4. | HIFK Helsinki | 8 | 2 | 2 | 4 | 32:49 | 6 |
| 5. | Jymy-Kiekko Kokkola | 8 | 2 | 1 | 5 | 26:45 | 5 |

Source: Elite Prospects

== 3rd place ==
- Tarmo Hämeenlinna - TPS Turku 3:3/4:1

== Final ==
- Ilves Tampere - Tappara Tampere 2:1 (4:6, 7:1, 3:1)

| Preceded by 1956–57 SM-sarja season | SM-sarja season 1957–58 | Succeeded by 1958–59 SM-sarja season |
