= 1945–46 SM-sarja season =

Finnish ice hockey season

The 1945–46 SM-sarja season was the 15th season of the SM-sarja, the top level of ice hockey in Finland. Nine teams participated in the league, and Ilves Tampere won the championship.

== Regular season ==
	Club	Sp	W	T	L	GF–GA	Pts
1.	Ilves Tampere	8	8	0	0	98:22	16
2.	Tarmo Hämeenlinna	8	7	0	1	83:24	14
3.	TBK Tampere	8	5	0	3	62:44	10
4.	HJK Helsinki	8	5	0	3	43:40	10
5.	HSK Helsinki	8	3	2	3	31:40	8
6.	TPS Turku	8	3	1	4	30:48	7
7.	KIF Helsinki	8	2	1	5	29:59	5
8.	ÅIFK Turku	8	0	1	7	23:65	1
9.	TaPa Tampere	8	0	1	7	11:68	1

Preceded by 1944–45 SM-sarja season	SM-sarja season 1945–46	Succeeded by 1946–47 SM-sarja season
