= 1961–62 SM-sarja season =

Finnish ice hockey season

The 1961–62 SM-sarja season was the 31st season of the SM-sarja, the top level of ice hockey in Finland. 10 teams participated in the league, and Ilves Tampere won the championship.

== Regular season ==
	Club	GP	W	T	L	GF–GA	Pts
1.	Ilves Tampere	18	15	1	2	95:33	31
2.	Koo-Vee Tampere	18	13	1	4	111:58	27
3.	Tappara Tampere	18	12	3	3	81:52	27
4.	Lukko Rauma	18	10	1	7	77:75	21
5.	Karhut Pori	18	9	2	7	76:74	20
6.	HJK Helsinki	18	9	1	8	90:65	19
7.	HIFK Helsinki	18	5	2	11	47:102	12
8.	SaiPa Lauritsala	18	5	1	12	51:77	11
9.	TPS Turku	18	5	1	12	52:65	11
10.	KalPa Kuopio	18	0	1	17	37:116	1

Source: Elite Prospects

=== 8th place ===
- SaiPa Lauritsala - TPS Turku 6:2

Preceded by 1960–61 SM-sarja season	SM-sarja season 1961–62	Succeeded by 1962–63 SM-sarja season
