= 1936–37 SM-sarja season =

Finnish ice hockey season

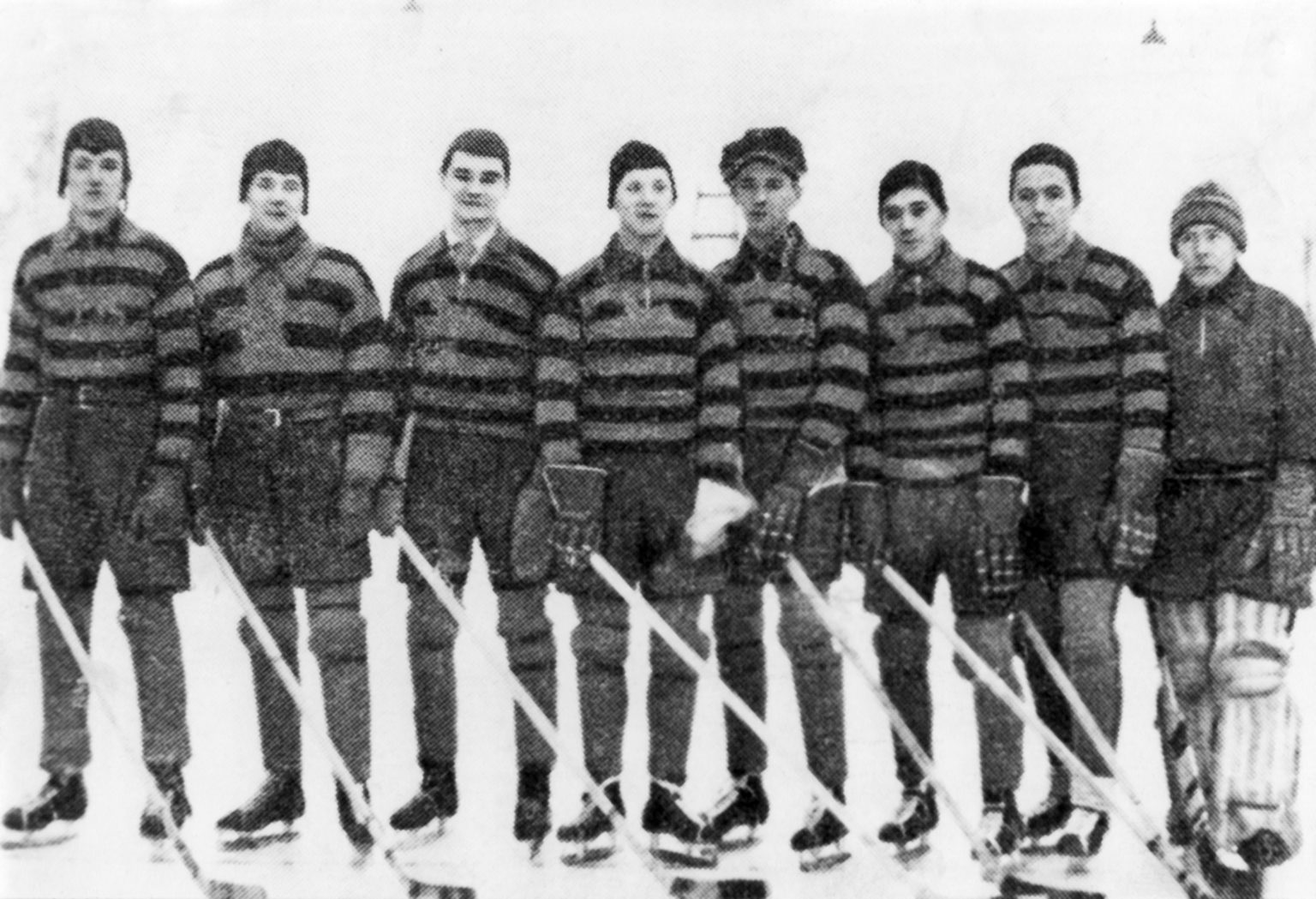
Ilves, the 1937 champion of the Finnish Ice Hockey Championship.

The 1936–1937 SM-Sarja Season was played between 4 Teams from 3 cities. Each team played 6 games each and the best ranking team won the championship. In this season there was no relegation.

== SM-Sarja Championship ==
SM-sarja	GP	W	T	L	Pts	GF	GA
Ilves Tampere	6	4	2	0	10	22	11
KIF Helsinki	6	3	2	1	8	22	18
HJK Helsinki	6	3	0	3	6	14	13
ÅIFK Turku	6	0	0	6	0	11	27

Ilves Wins the 1936–37 SM-Sarja championship.

Preceded by 1935–36 SM-sarja season	SM-sarja season 1936–37	Succeeded by 1937–38 SM-sarja season
