= 1937–38 SM-sarja season =

Finnish ice hockey season

The 1937–38 SM-sarja season was played between 5 teams from 3 cities. Each team played 4 games.

== SM-sarja Championship ==
SM-sarja	GP	W	T	L	Pts	GF	GA
Ilves Tampere	4	4	0	0	8	14	5
HJK Helsinki	4	3	0	1	6	12	7
KIF Helsinki	4	2	0	2	4	11	12
ÅIFK Turku	4	0	1	3	1	4	10
Riento Turku	4	0	1	3	1	3	10

Ilves wins the 1937–38 SM-sarja championship

Preceded by 1936–37 SM-sarja season	SM-sarja season 1937–38	Succeeded by 1938–39 SM-sarja season
