= Turun Pallokerho =

Association football club in Finland

- Full name: Turun Pallokerho
- Founded: 1935; 90 years ago
- Ground: Turun Urheilupuisto, Turku, Finland
- Capacity: 800
- Chairman: Jarmo Sundin
- Manager: Timo Jalo
- League: Kolmonen
- 2016: 3rd
- Website: www.turunpallokerho.fi

Turun Pallokerho (or TPK) is an association football club from Turku, Finland currently playing in the Finnish fourth tier Kolmonen. TPK has played two seasons in the Finnish premier division Mestaruussarja in 1951 and 1952, finishing third in 1951.

TPK is the first youth club of the Finland national football team goalkeeper Lukáš Hrádecký.

== Season-to-season ==
Season to Season

Season	Level	Division	Section	Administration	Position	Movements
1943–44	Tier 3	Maakuntasarja (Third Division)	Cup-competition	Finnish FA (Suomen Pallolitto)		
1945	Tier 2	Suomensarja (Second Division)	Group A	Finnish FA (Suomen Pallolitto)	3rd	Relegated
1945–46	Tier 3	Maakuntasarja (Third Division)	South-West Finland	Finnish FA (Suomen Pallolitto)	1st	Promotion Playoff – Promoted
1946–47	Tier 2	Suomensarja (Second Division)	South Group	Finnish FA (Suomen Pallolitto)	4th	
1947–48	Tier 2	Suomensarja (Second Division)	South Group	Finnish FA (Suomen Pallolitto)	3rd	
1948	Tier 2	Suomensarja (Second Division)	South Group	Finnish FA (Suomen Pallolitto)	2nd	
1949	Tier 2	Suomensarja (Second Division)	West Group	Finnish FA (Suomen Pallolitto)	2nd	
1950	Tier 2	Suomensarja (Second Division)	West Group	Finnish FA (Suomen Pallolitto)	1st	Promoted
1951	Tier 1	Mestaruussarja (Premier League)		Finnish FA (Suomen Palloliitto)	3rd	
1952	Tier 1	Mestaruussarja (Premier League)		Finnish FA (Suomen Palloliitto)	9th	Relegated
1953	Tier 2	Suomensarja (Second Division)	West Group	Finnish FA (Suomen Pallolitto)	2nd	
1954	Tier 2	Suomensarja (Second Division)	West Group	Finnish FA (Suomen Pallolitto)	9th	Relegated
1955	Tier 3	Maakuntasarja (Third Division)	West Group I	Finnish FA (Suomen Pallolitto)	3rd	
1956	Tier 3	Maakuntasarja (Third Division)	West Group II	Finnish FA (Suomen Pallolitto)	4th	
1957	Tier 3	Maakuntasarja (Third Division)	West Group I	Finnish FA (Suomen Pallolitto)	5th	
1958	Tier 3	Maakuntasarja (Third Division)	Group 3 – Turku	Finnish FA (Suomen Pallolitto)	6th	
1959	Tier 3	Maakuntasarja (Third Division)	Group 3	Finnish FA (Suomen Pallolitto)	3rd	
1960	Tier 3	Maakuntasarja (Third Division)	Group 3	Finnish FA (Suomen Pallolitto)	4th	
1961	Tier 3	Maakuntasarja (Third Division)	Group 2	Finnish FA (Suomen Pallolitto)	6th	
1962	Tier 3	Maakuntasarja (Third Division)	Group 2	Finnish FA (Suomen Pallolitto)	1st	Promoted
1963	Tier 2	Suomensarja (Second Division)	West Group	Finnish FA (Suomen Pallolitto)	11th	Relegated
1964	Tier 3	Maakuntasarja (Third Division)	Group 3	Finnish FA (Suomen Pallolitto)	4th	
1965	Tier 3	Maakuntasarja (Third Division)	Group 3	Finnish FA (Suomen Pallolitto)	8th	Relegated
1966	Tier 4	Aluesarja (Fourth Division)	Group 5	Finnish FA (Suomen Pallolitto)	1st	Promoted
1967	Tier 3	Maakuntasarja (Third Division)	Group 3	Finnish FA (Suomen Pallolitto)	5th	
1968	Tier 3	Maakuntasarja (Third Division)	Group 3	Finnish FA (Suomen Pallolitto)	4th	
1969	Tier 3	Maakuntasarja (Third Division)	Group 3	Finnish FA (Suomen Pallolitto)	1st	Promoted
1970	Tier 2	II Divisioona (Second Division)	West Group	Finnish FA (Suomen Pallolitto)	12th	Relegated
1971	Tier 3	III Divisioona (Third Division)	Group 2	Finnish FA (Suomen Pallolitto)	5th	
1972	Tier 3	III Divisioona (Third Division)	Group 2	Finnish FA (Suomen Pallolitto)	5th	
1973	Tier 4	III Divisioona (Third Division)	Group 3	Finnish FA (Suomen Pallolitto)	10th	Relegated
1974	Tier 5	IV Divisioona (Fourth Division)	Group 5	Finnish FA (Suomen Pallolitto)	1st	Promoted
1975	Tier 4	III Divisioona (Third Division)	Group 3	Finnish FA (Suomen Pallolitto)	6th	
1976	Tier 4	III Divisioona (Third Division)	Group 3	Finnish FA (Suomen Pallolitto)	10th	Relegated
1977	Tier 5	IV Divisioona (Fourth Division)	Group 5	Finnish FA (Suomen Pallolitto)	3rd	
1978	Tier 5	IV Divisioona (Fourth Division)	Group 5	Finnish FA (Suomen Pallolitto)	4th	
1979	Tier 5	IV Divisioona (Fourth Division)	Group 6	Finnish FA (Suomen Pallolitto)	5th	
1980	Tier 5	IV Divisioona (Fourth Division)	Group 5	Finnish FA (Suomen Pallolitto)	4th	
1981	Tier 5	IV Divisioona (Fourth Division)	Group 5	Finnish FA (Suomen Pallolitto)	9th	Relegated
1982	Tier 6	V Divisioona (Fifth Division)		Turku District (SPL Turku)		Promoted
1983	Tier 5	IV Divisioona (Fourth Division)	Group 5	Finnish FA (Suomen Pallolitto)	2nd	Promotion Playoff
1984	Tier 5	IV Divisioona (Fourth Division)	Group 4	Finnish FA (Suomen Pallolitto)	3rd	Promotion Playoff
1985	Tier 5	IV Divisioona (Fourth Division)	Group 5	Finnish FA (Suomen Pallolitto)	8th	Relegation Playoff – Relegated
1986	Tier 6	V Divisioona (Fifth Division)		Turku District (SPL Turku)		Promoted
1987	Tier 5	IV Divisioona (Fourth Division)	Group 5	Finnish FA (Suomen Pallolitto)	8th	
1988	Tier 5	IV Divisioona (Fourth Division)	Group 4	Finnish FA (Suomen Pallolitto)	7th	
1989–95	Unknown					
1996	Tier 5	Nelonen (Fourth Division)	Turku & Åland Islands	Turku District (SPL Turku)	5th	
1997	Tier 5	Nelonen (Fourth Division)	Turku & Åland Islands	Turku District (SPL Turku)	1st	Promoted
1998	Tier 3	Kakkonen (Second Division)	South	Finnish FA (Suomen Pallolitto)	11th	Relegated
1999	Tier 4	Kolmonen (Third Division)	Group 3	Turku District (SPL Turku)	2nd	Promotion Playoff – Promoted
2000	Tier 3	Kakkonen (Second Division)	West	Finnish FA (Suomen Pallolitto)	3rd	
2001	Tier 3	Kakkonen (Second Division)	West	Finnish FA (Suomen Pallolitto)	7th	
2002	Tier 3	Kakkonen (Second Division)	West	Finnish FA (Suomen Pallolitto)	12th	Relegated
2003	Tier 4	Kolmonen (Third Division)	Turku & Åland Islands	Turku District (SPL Turku)	4th	
2004	Tier 4	Kolmonen (Third Division)	Turku & Åland Islands	Turku District (SPL Turku)	9th	
2005	Tier 4	Kolmonen (Third Division)	Turku & Åland Islands	Turku District (SPL Turku)	8th	
2006	Tier 4	Kolmonen (Third Division)	Turku & Åland Islands	Turku District (SPL Turku)	7th	
2007	Tier 4	Kolmonen (Third Division)	Turku & Åland Islands	Turku District (SPL Turku)	8th	
2008	Tier 4	Kolmonen (Third Division)	Turku & Åland Islands	Turku District (SPL Turku)	2nd	
2009	Tier 4	Kolmonen (Third Division)	Turku & Åland Islands	Turku District (SPL Turku)	4th	
2010	Tier 4	Kolmonen (Third Division)	Turku & Åland Islands	Turku District (SPL Turku)	3rd	
2011	Tier 4	Kolmonen (Third Division)	Turku & Åland Islands	Turku District (SPL Turku)	3rd	
2012	Tier 4	Kolmonen (Third Division)	Turku & Åland Islands	Turku District (SPL Turku)	3rd	
2013	Tier 4	Kolmonen (Third Division)	Turku & Åland Islands	Turku District (SPL Turku)	2nd	
2014	Tier 4	Kolmonen (Third Division)	Turku & Åland Islands	Turku District (SPL Turku)	3rd	
2015	Tier 4	Kolmonen (Third Division)	Turku & Åland Islands	Turku District (SPL Turku)	5th	
2016	Tier 4	Kolmonen (Third Division)	Turku & Åland Islands	Turku District (SPL Turku)	3rd	
2017	Tier 4	Kolmonen (Third Division)	Western Finland	Western District (SPL Länsi-Suomi)	6th	
2018	Tier 4	Kolmonen (Third Division)	Western Finland	Western District (SPL Länsi-Suomi)	9th	
2019	Tier 4	Kolmonen (Third Division)	Western Finland	Western District (SPL Länsi-Suomi)	7th	

- 2 seasons in Mestaruussarja
- 10 seasons in Suomensarja
- 21 seasons in Kakkonen
- 22 seasons in Kolmonen
- 13 seasons in Nelonen
- 2 seasons in V Divisioona
