= Karhu-Kissat =

- City: Helsinki, Finland
- League: 3. Divisioona
- Founded: 1938
- Home arena: Kaarelan jäähalli
- Colours
- Owner(s): Karhu-Kissat ry
- General manager: Jari Kostiainen
- Head coach: Dan Wicklund
- Captain: Fredrik Wikström
- Website: www.karhu-kissat.fi

Karhu-Kissat is a Finnish ice hockey club founded in 1938 and based at Helsinki. From 1942 until 1974 the club played in the top two levels of the Finnish ice hockey league system. Nowadays the club operates as a sports academy, investing especially in the provision of training and experience for young players. The club's activities take place mainly at the city's western region.

== History ==
The first team was created by a group of teenagers from HJK who had played hockey in junior games. The founding meeting was held on October 19, 1938. The club's name was inspired by Bearcats, a notable Canadian club of that period.

Karhu-Kissat played in the country's top-tier SM-sarja for the first time the season 1942–43. In February 6th of the next season, the match between Karhu-Kissat and TBK at Helsinki was stopped because the hockey field was bombed. As a result, a Karhu-Kissat's player was injured and never played hockey again. The seasons 1944–45, 1946–47 and 1948–49, the club also played in the top-tier but after all those seasons was relegated. They returned decisively in the top-tier the season 1951–52, and stayed there until the season 1956–57. This period the team managed to take second place in 1953-54 SM-sarja after losing both games to TBK at the final. Another participation in SM-sarja, the season 1971–72, ended in relegation. The club played for the last time in the top-tier the season 1973–74. The years that followed, financial difficulties never let the club take part in the top league categories. Currently the club plays in the 3. Divisioona, the 5th-level league of Finland.
