= Hämeenlinnan Tarmo =

Hämeenlinnan Tarmo logo

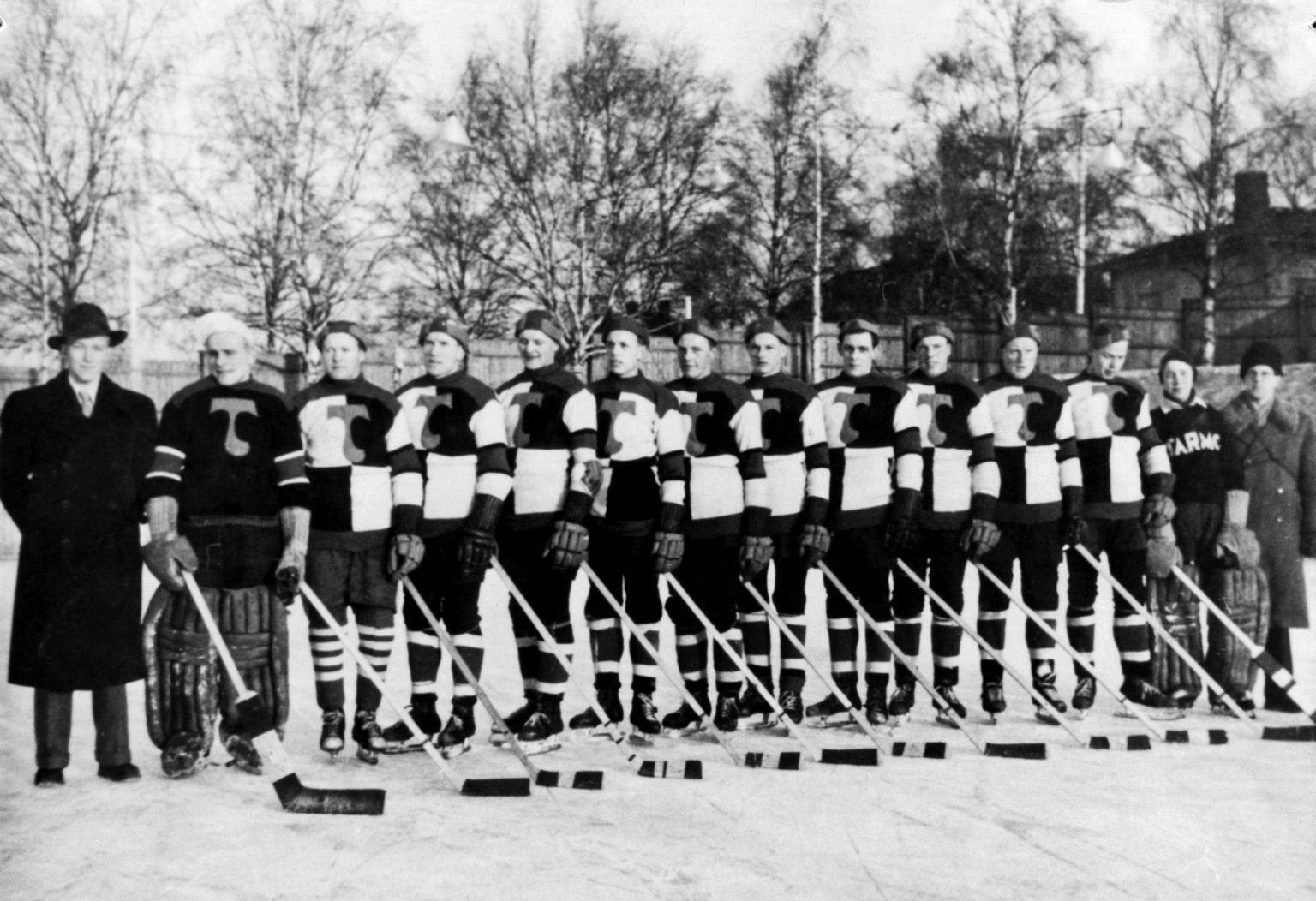
Tarmo ice hockey team in 1949

Hämeenlinnan Tarmo is a sports club founded in Hämeenlinna, Finland, in 1903. It currently has about 1500 members. The club participates in athletics, cycling, strength sports, bowling, orienteering, and volleyball. The president of the club is Kalevi Kilpi.

Up to the 1970s, the club also participated in ice hockey, where its local opponents were HPK and Tiikerit, also known as HT-85, which later moved to field hockey.

== Accomplishments in ice hockey ==
- Gold medal in Finnish championships 1948, 1949
- Silver medal in Finnish championships 1945, 1946, 1947, 1950, 1951, 1953, 1956
- Bronze medal in Finnish championships 1952, 1958
