= Jarmo Wasama Memorial Trophy =

Liiga trophy

The Jarmo Wasama Memorial Trophy is an ice hockey award given by the Finnish Liiga to the best rookie of the season. The trophy is named in honor of Jarmo Wasama, a young Finnish defenseman who was killed in an automobile accident in 1966.

Season	Winner	Team
1971–72	Seppo Ahokainen	Ilves
1972–73	Jukka Alkula	Tappara
1973–74	Matti Hagman	HIFK
1974–75	Markus Mattsson	Ilves
1975–76	Kari Makkonen	Ässät
1976–77	Risto Siltanen	Ilves
1977–78	Markku Kiimalainen	Kärpät
1978–79	Kari Jalonen	Kärpät
1979–80	Pekka Arbelius	Kärpät
1980–81	Petri Skriko	SaiPa
1981–82	Hannu Virta	TPS
1982–83	Jukka Tammi	Ilves
1983–84	Joel Paunio	HIFK
1984–85	Jari Neuvonen	Ilves
1985–86	Risto Kurkinen	JYP
1986–87	Janne Ojanen	Tappara
1987–88	Mika Nieminen	Ilves
1988–89	Pekka Peltola	HPK
1989–90	Vesa Viitakoski	SaiPa
1990–91	Janne Grönvall	Lukko
1991–92	Petri Varis	Ässät
1992–93	Ville Peltonen	HIFK
1993–94	Juha Lind	Jokerit
1994–95	Joni Lehto	Lukko
1995–96	Jani Hurme	TPS
1996–97	Olli Jokinen	HIFK
1997–98	Pasi Puistola	Ilves
1998–99	Timo Pärssinen	HPK
1999–2000	Antero Niittymäki	TPS
2000–01	Toni Dahlman	Ilves
2001–02	Joonas Vihko	HIFK
2002–03	Toni Söderholm	HIFK
2003–04	Janne Pesonen	Kärpät
2004–05	Simo Vidgren	Ilves
2005–06	Perttu Lindgren	Ilves
2006–07	Tuomas Suominen	TPS
2007–08	Oskar Osala	Blues
2008–09	Teemu Hartikainen	KalPa
2009–10	Mikael Granlund	HIFK
2010–11	Teemu Pulkkinen	Jokerit
2011–12	Teuvo Teräväinen	Jokerit
2012–13	Artturi Lehkonen	KalPa
2013–14	Juuse Saros	HPK
2014–15	Otso Rantakari	Blues
2015–16	Patrik Laine	Tappara
2016–17	Otto Koivula	Ilves
2017–18	Petrus Palmu	TPS
2018–19	Kaapo Kakko	TPS
2019–20	Matias Maccelli	Ilves
2020–21	Kasper Björkqvist	KooKoo
2021–22	Joakim Kemell	JYP
2022–23	Niko Huuhtanen	Jukurit
2023–24	Viljami Marjala	TPS
2024–25	Petteri Rimpinen	Kiekko-Espoo
