= Matti Forss =

Finnish ice hockey player

- Born: May 17, 1957 (age 67); Rauma, Finland
- Height: 5 ft 11 in (180 cm)
- Weight: 176 lb (80 kg; 12 st 8 lb)
- Position: Center
- Shot: Left
- Played for: Lukko; HIFK
- National team: Finland
- NHL draft: 117th overall, 1977; St. Louis Blues
- WHA draft: 74th overall, 1977; Houston Aeros
- Playing career: 1973–1994

Matti Forss (born May 17, 1957 in Rauma, Finland) is a retired professional ice hockey player who played in the SM-liiga.

== Playing career ==
He played for HIFK and Lukko. He was inducted into the Finnish Hockey Hall of Fame in 1998.

== Career statistics ==
			Regular season					Playoffs
Season	Team	League	GP	G	A	Pts	PIM	GP	G	A	Pts	PIM
1973–74	Lukko	SM-sarja	29	7	8	15	4	—	—	—	—	—
1974–75	Lukko	SM-sarja	27	4	7	11	33	—	—	—	—	—
1975–76	Lukko	Liiga	36	13	24	37	45	—	—	—	—	—
1976–77	Lukko	Liiga	35	19	18	37	44	—	—	—	—	—
1977–78	HIFK	Liiga	33	6	5	11	22	—	—	—	—	—
1978–79	HIFK	Liiga	36	5	9	14	21	6	3	2	5	2
1979–80	HIFK	Liiga	34	15	19	34	36	7	1	4	5	4
1980–81	HIFK	Liiga	36	12	32	44	20	7	3	5	8	2
1981–82	HIFK	Liiga	36	13	30	43	24	8	4	3	7	0
1982–83	HIFK	Liiga	33	15	11	26	26	9	2	3	5	12
1983–84	Lukko	I-Divisioona	34	17	26	43	30	—	—	—	—	—
1984–85	Lukko	Liiga	36	14	18	32	16	—	—	—	—	—
1985–86	Lukko	Liiga	36	10	8	18	28	—	—	—	—	—
1986–87	Lukko	Liiga	43	14	25	39	24	—	—	—	—	—
1987–88	Lukko	Liiga	44	10	25	35	14	8	1	2	3	4
1988–89	Lukko	Liiga	43	14	19	33	8	—	—	—	—	—
1989–90	Lukko	Liiga	35	11	13	24	14	—	—	—	—	—
1990–91	Lukko	Liiga	43	8	15	23	10	4	5	3	8	8
1991–92	Lukko	Liiga	44	5	6	11	10	—	—	—	—	—
1992–93	Lukko	Liiga	46	7	13	20	14	3	0	2	2	0
1993–94	Lukko	Liiga	4	0	2	2	0	—	—	—	—	—
Liiga totals			653	191	292	483	376	52	19	24	43	32
