= Kari Makkonen =

Finnish ice hockey player (born 1955)

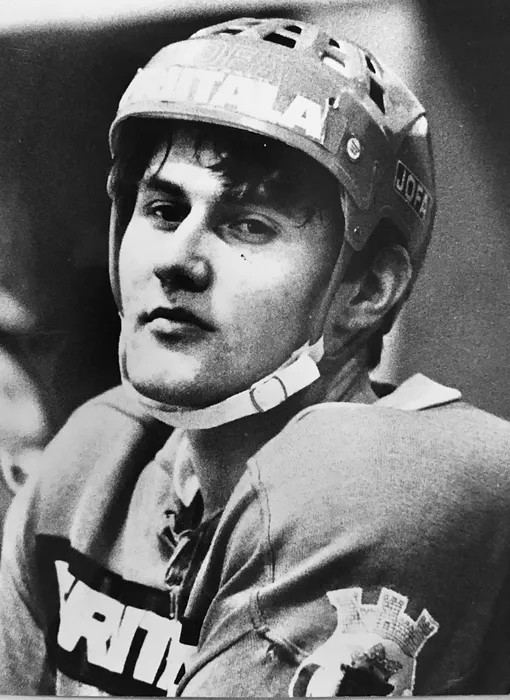
- Makkonen in his professional debut season with Ässät in 1974
- Born: January 20, 1955 (age 71) Harjavalta, Finland
- Height: 6 ft 0 in (183 cm)
- Weight: 191 lb (87 kg; 13 st 9 lb)
- Position: Left wing
- Shot: Left
- Played for: Kuparikiekko; Edmonton Oilers; Houston Apollos; HC Ässät Pori
- National team: Finland
- NHL draft: 194th overall, 1975; New York Islanders
- WHA draft: 127th overall, 1975; Indianapolis Racers; 42nd overall, 1976; Phoenix Roadrunners
- Playing career: 1974–1991
- Coaching career: 1996–2020

Kari Makkonen (born January 20, 1955) is a Finnish retired professional ice hockey player and coach. He played in the Finnish Elite League with Ässät for 16 seasons. Makkonen played one National Hockey League season with the Edmonton Oilers.

== Playing career ==
Kari Makkonen started his career with Harjavallan Kuparikiekko at eleven years old. He played the 1973–74 season with Kuparikiekko in the third tier Maakuntasarja, scoring 14 goals and 9 assists in 10 games for the club, which was enough for fifth place in points in his division and 15th in the league.

The following season at 19 years old, Makkonen made the move to HC Ässät Pori in the SM-sarja, the top division of Finland at the time. Makkonen played 36 games in his debut season, scoring 10 points for his team. In the inaugural 1975–76 season of the SM-liiga, Makkonen played 36 games and scored 39 points. Makkonen appeared in 4 playoff games, scoring 3 points. Makkonen won the Rookie of the Year award.

Makkonen stayed with Ässät and in the 1977–78 season the club won the Kanada-malja championship. Kari Makkonen scored 44 points in 36 games and was chosen to the SM-liiga all-star team for the first time. The following season Makkonen lead the league in goals with 36 goals in 36 games. In total he scored 54 points. The team lost to Tappara in the playoff finals and Makkonen was chosen to the all-star team for a second time.

Makkonen signed a National Hockey League (NHL) contract with the Edmonton Oilers for the 1979–80 season. Makkonen played in the NHL for nine games, scoring four points total. Makkonen played his first NHL game on November 7, 1979 and scored his first goal on 12 December 1979.

Makkonen would return to Ässät after one NHL season. He would play with the club until 1991, winning an SM-liiga silver medal in 1984. Makkonen's highest point scoring season was the 1989–90 season when Ässät was relegated to the I-divisioona, where he would score 83 points in 44 games. Makkonen was inducted into the Finnish Hockey Hall of Fame in 1995. His jersey number was retired by Ässät in 2024.

== Coaching career ==
Makkonen coached his first seasons as coach in the Finnish lower divisions for Seinäjoki HT and Kotkan Titaanit. Makkonen got his first SM-liiga coaching job when he coached Ässät for a short period. Makkonen was also employed by Lukko for some time before he was employed by Tappara as an assistant coach for Jukka Rautakorpi. He was the assistant coach in Tappara for several years, winning the Kanada-malja championship in 2003 and finishing second in 2001 and 2002. Makkonen was the head coach of Mestis team Jukurit from 2007 to 2009.

== Career statistics ==
=== Regular season and playoffs ===
			Regular season					Playoffs
Season	Team	League	GP	G	A	Pts	PIM	GP	G	A	Pts	PIM
1974–75	Ässät	SM-s	36	5	5	10	8	—	—	—	—	—
1975–76	Ässät	SM-l	36	24	15	39	25	4	1	2	3	2
1976–77	Ässät	SM-l	36	17	20	37	18	—	—	—	—	—
1977–78	Ässät	SM-l	39	19	25	44	28	9	4	5	9	9
1978–79	Ässät	SM-l	36	36	18	54	55	1	0	0	0	0
1979–80	Edmonton Oilers	NHL	9	2	2	4	0	—	—	—	—	—
1979–80	Houston Apollos	CHL	16	5	5	10	2	—	—	—	—	—
1980–81	Ässät	SM-l	36	19	21	40	20	1	0	0	0	0
1981–82	Ässät	SM-l	36	24	20	44	12	9	5	4	9	0
1982–83	Ässät	SM-l	35	14	18	32	22	—	—	—	—	—
1983–84	Ässät	SM-l	37	27	15	42	28	9	3	4	7	19
1984–85	Ässät	SM-l	36	18	20	38	32	8	6	4	10	6
1985–86	Ässät	SM-l	34	23	26	49	24	—	—	—	—	—
1986–87	Ässät	SM-l	43	14	22	36	20	—	—	—	—	—
1987–88	Ässät	SM-l	43	21	16	37	36	—	—	—	—	—
1988–89	Ässät	SM-l	42	16	24	40	20	—	—	—	—	—
1989–90	Ässät	I-Div	44	31	52	83	18	3	3	3	6	2
1990–91	Ässät	SM-l	43	9	24	33	20	—	—	—	—	—
SM-l totals			568	268	289	575	368	41	19	19	38	36

=== International ===
Year	Team	Event	GP	G	A	Pts	PIM
1975	Finland	WJC	5	2	2	4	4
1976	Finland	WC	10	3	3	6	6
1976	Finland	CC	5	3	1	4	2
1977	Finland	WC	10	4	4	8	2
1978	Finland	WC	10	1	0	1	4
1981	Finland	CC	3	0	0	0	0
1982	Finland	WC	7	2	2	4	2
1983	Finland	WC	10	1	1	2	8
1985	Finland	WC	10	1	0	1	4
1986	Finland	WC	10	4	2	6	10
Junior totals			5	2	2	4	4
Senior totals			75	19	13	32	40

Preceded by Markus Mattsson	Winner of the Jarmo Wasama memorial trophy 1975–76	Succeeded by Risto Siltanen
Preceded by Markku Kiimalainen	Winner of the Aarne Honkavaara trophy 1978–79	Succeeded by Matti Hagman
Preceded by Veli-Pekka Ketola	Head coach of Ässät; 1996	Succeeded by Juhani Tamminen
Preceded by Pekka Lipiäinen	Head coach of Jukurit; 2007-2008	Succeeded by Pekka Lipiäinen
Preceded by Petri Niukkanen	Head coach of TUTO Hockey; 2011-2012	Succeeded by Juhani Tamminen
