= Tapio Levo =

Finnish ice hockey player

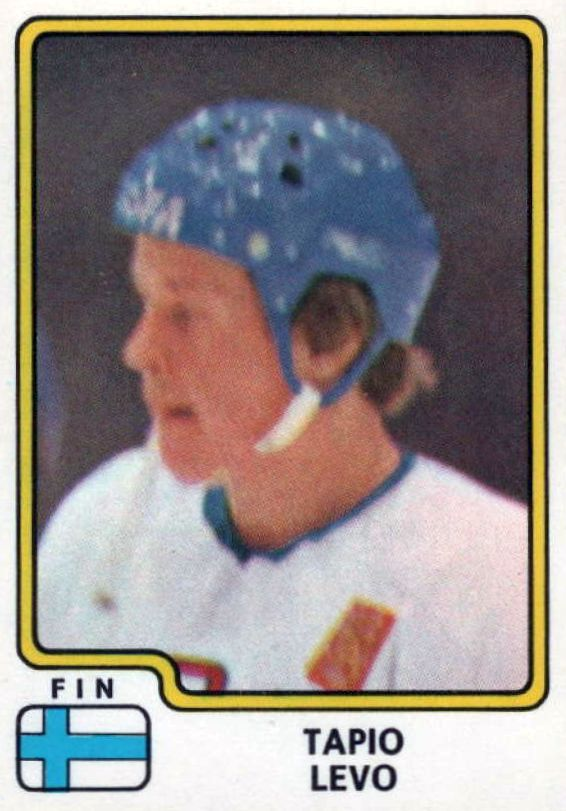
- Born: 24 September 1955 (age 70) Pori, Finland
- Height: 6 ft 1 in (185 cm)
- Weight: 200 lb (91 kg; 14 st 4 lb)
- Position: Defence
- Shot: Left
- Played for: SM-liiga; Ässät; HPK; NHL; Colorado Rockies; New Jersey Devils; 1. Divisioona; Junkkarit HT
- National team: Finland
- NHL draft: 139th overall, 1975; Pittsburgh Penguins
- Playing career: 1972–1993

Tapio Antero Levo (born 24 September 1955) is a retired Finnish professional ice hockey player who played in the SM-liiga and National Hockey League. Born in Pori, he played for Ässät in Finland, and the New Jersey Devils and Colorado Rockies in the NHL. He was inducted into the Finnish Hockey Hall of Fame in 1995. He also played for Finland in the 1980 Winter Olympics and scored the team's first goal of the tournament and registered four assists as well.

== Career statistics ==
=== Regular season and playoffs ===
			Regular season					Playoffs
Season	Team	League	GP	G	A	Pts	PIM	GP	G	A	Pts	PIM
1972–73	Ässät	FIN U20	16	—	—	—	—	—	—	—	—	—
1972–73	Ässät	SM-s	1	0	0	0	0	—	—	—	—	—
1973–74	Ässät	SM-s	10	0	0	0	4	—	—	—	—	—
1974–75	Ässät	SM-s	36	5	2	7	48	—	—	—	—	—
1975–76	Ässät	SM-l	36	12	8	20	47	4	0	1	1	6
1976–77	Ässät	SM-l	36	12	7	19	34	—	—	—	—	—
1977–78	Ässät	SM-l	36	8	11	19	32	9	2	1	3	12
1978–79	Ässät	SM-l	36	15	6	21	34	8	7	2	9	20
1979–80	Ässät	SM-l	30	11	9	20	55	7	6	3	9	4
1980–81	Ässät	SM-l	36	16	7	23	38	2	1	1	2	4
1981–82	Colorado Rockies	NHL	34	9	13	22	14	—	—	—	—	—
1982–83	New Jersey Devils	NHL	73	7	40	47	22	—	—	—	—	—
1983–84	Ässät	SM-l	34	9	20	29	52	9	4	7	11	16
1984–85	Ässät	SM-l	36	20	22	42	26	8	1	3	4	16
1985–86	Ässät	SM-l	35	15	20	35	34	—	—	—	—	—
1986–87	Ässät	SM-l	44	22	17	39	26	—	—	—	—	—
1987–88	Ässät	SM-l	44	15	23	38	38	—	—	—	—	—
1988–89	Ässät	SM-l	43	21	21	42	28	—	—	—	—	—
1989–90	Ässät	FIN.2	44	32	47	79	33	3	0	5	5	2
1990–91	Ässät	SM-l	39	10	23	33	28	—	—	—	—	—
1991–92	Ässät	SM-l	44	9	16	25	36	8	1	3	4	8
1992–93	JHT	FIN.2	26	11	21	32	41	—	—	—	—	—
1992–93	HPK	SM-l	17	1	3	4	2	5	0	1	1	0
SM-s totals			47	5	2	7	52	—	—	—	—	—
SM-l totals			546	196	213	409	510	60	22	22	44	86
NHL totals			107	16	53	69	36	—	—	—	—	—

=== International ===
Year	Team	Event	GP	G	A	Pts	PIM
1973	Finland	EJC	5	0	3	3	2
1975	Finland	WJC	5	1	2	3	7
1976	Finland	WC	10	1	0	1	6
1976	Finland	CC	4	1	2	3	2
1978	Finland	WC	10	2	0	2	2
1980	Finland	OLY	4	1	4	5	2
1981	Finland	WC	8	4	4	8	10
1981	Finland	CC	5	0	1	1	2
1982	Finland	WC	7	2	1	3	4
1983	Finland	WC	10	4	1	5	6
Junior totals			10	1	5	6	9
Senior totals			58	15	13	28	34

Preceded by Nikolai Makarov	Winner of the Pekka Rautakallio trophy 1983–84 & 1984–85	Succeeded by Pekka Rautakallio
Preceded by Arto Javanainen	Captain of Ässät; 1983–1992	Succeeded by Olli Kaski
