= Antero Lehtonen =

Finnish ice hockey player

- Born: April 12, 1954 (age 70); Tampere, Finland
- Height: 5 ft 11 in (180 cm)
- Weight: 176 lb (80 kg; 12 st 8 lb)
- Position: Left wing
- Shot: Left
- Played for: Tappara; HC TPS; Washington Capitals; JYP Jyväskylä
- National team: Finland
- NHL draft: Undrafted
- Playing career: 1971–1987

Antero Lehtonen (born 12 April 1954) is a Finnish former ice hockey player.

He played 65 games in the National Hockey League (NHL) with the Washington Capitals during the 1979–80 season. The rest of his career, which lasted from 1971 to 1987, was spent in the Finnish SM-liiga. Internationally Lehtonen played for the Finnish national team at the 1977, 1979 and 1981 World Championships, as well as at junior tournaments.

== Career statistics ==
=== Regular season and playoffs ===
			Regular season					Playoffs
Season	Team	League	GP	G	A	Pts	PIM	GP	G	A	Pts	PIM
1970–71	Tappara U20	FIN U20	—	—	—	—	—	—	—	—	—	—
1971–72	Tappara U20	FIN U20	14	21	15	36	18	—	—	—	—	—
1971–72	Tappara	FIN	1	0	0	0	2	—	—	—	—	—
1972–73	Tappara U20	FIN U20	6	—	—	—	—	—	—	—	—	—
1972–73	Tappara	FIN	36	20	5	25	23	—	—	—	—	—
1973–74	Tappara	FIN	36	9	7	16	10	—	—	—	—	—
1974–75	Tappara	FIN	36	26	7	33	26	—	—	—	—	—
1975–76	Tappara	SM-l	36	19	11	30	21	4	0	2	2	8
1976–77	HC TPS	SM-l	36	26	12	38	12	8	4	1	5	4
1977–78	HC TPS	SM-l	35	23	13	36	38	8	3	5	8	4
1978–79	Tappara	SM-l	36	35	19	54	43	10	8	5	13	6
1979–80	Washington Capitals	NHL	65	9	12	21	14	—	—	—	—	—
1979–80	Hershey Bears	AHL	4	3	0	3	2	—	—	—	—	—
1980–81	Tappara	SM-l	27	13	7	20	24	8	7	3	10	6
1981–82	HC TPS	SM-l	36	14	8	22	35	7	2	1	3	6
1982–83	HC TPS	SM-l	36	11	10	21	16	3	4	0	4	0
1983–84	HC TPS	SM-l	30	8	13	21	14	9	1	1	2	4
1984–85	Jyp HT	FIN-2	35	35	25	60	16	—	—	—	—	—
1985–86	Jyp HT	SM-l	36	23	12	35	14	—	—	—	—	—
1986–87	Jyp HT	SM-l	39	10	8	18	20	—	—	—	—	—
SM-l totals			347	182	113	295	237	57	29	18	47	38
NHL totals			65	9	12	21	14	—	—	—	—	—

=== International ===
Year	Team	Event	GP	G	A	Pts	PIM
1973	Finland	EJC	5	1	0	1	12
1974	Finland	WJC	5	1	2	3	6
1977	Finland	WC	9	1	1	2	6
1979	Finland	WC	8	3	3	6	0
1981	Finland	WC	8	0	3	3	0
Junior totals			10	2	2	4	18
Senior totals			25	4	7	11	6
