= Pertti Lehtonen =

Finnish ice hockey player

Pertti Leo Jorma Lehtonen (born 18 October 1956 in Helsinki, Finland) is a retired professional ice hockey player who played in the SM-liiga. He played for HIFK. He was inducted into the Finnish Hockey Hall of Fame in 1998. His nickname was "Ruoska"("The whip") because of his strong slapshot.

== Career statistics ==
=== Regular season and playoffs ===
			Regular season					Playoffs
Season	Team	League	GP	G	A	Pts	PIM	GP	G	A	Pts	PIM
1973–74	Karhu-Kissat	FIN	5	0	0	0	4	—	—	—	—	—
1974–75	HIFK	FIN U20
1975–76	PiTa	FIN U20					59
1975–76	PiTa	FIN.2	35	5	6	11	91	—	—	—	—	—
1976–77	HIFK	SM-l	36	3	4	7	42	7	1	0	1	6
1977–78	HIFK	SM-l	34	5	6	11	56	—	—	—	—	—
1978–79	HIFK	SM-l	36	9	11	20	61	6	3	1	4	6
1979–80	HIFK	SM-l	36	12	14	26	39	7	0	1	1	6
1980–81	HIFK	SM-l	36	9	16	25	34	7	3	2	5	2
1981–82	HIFK	SM-l	36	15	21	36	40	8	4	2	6	10
1982–83	HIFK	SM-l	35	10	14	24	36	9	3	5	8	2
1983–84	HIFK	SM-l	37	19	25	44	18	2	0	0	0	0
1984–85	HIFK	SM-l	36	14	16	30	20	—	—	—	—	—
1985–86	HIFK	SM-l	36	17	9	26	28	10	3	0	3	4
1986–87	HIFK	SM-l	44	17	14	31	24	3	1	3	4	4
1987–88	HIFK	SM-l	44	16	14	30	48	6	1	5	6	10
1988–89	HIFK	SM-l	44	16	18	34	36	2	0	0	0	0
1989–90	HIFK	SM-l	40	7	13	20	34	2	0	0	0	0
1990–91	HIFK	SM-l	43	5	25	30	30	3	1	1	2	0
1991–92	HIFK	SM-l	34	7	19	26	14	9	2	1	3	12
1992–93	HIFK	SM-l	48	9	12	21	30	4	1	0	1	25
1993–94	HIFK	SM-l	46	10	15	25	32	3	0	2	2	0
1994–95	HIFK	SM-l	46	15	21	36	34	3	0	0	0	4
1995–96	HIFK	SM-l	43	5	13	18	30	3	1	0	1	2
1996–97	HIFK	SM-l	47	8	9	17	16	—	—	—	—	—
1997–98	HIFK	SM-l	14	0	3	3	16	3	0	0	0	0
SM-l totals			851	228	312	540	718	97	24	23	47	93

=== International ===
Year	Team	Event	GP	G	A	Pts	PIM
1981	Finland	WC	8	0	2	2	8
1982	Finland	WC	7	0	4	4	0
1983	Finland	WC	10	2	1	3	6
1984	Finland	OG	6	0	1	1	6
1989	Finland	WC	9	0	2	2	0
Senior totals			40	2	10	12	20
