= Martti Jarkko =

Finnish ice hockey player

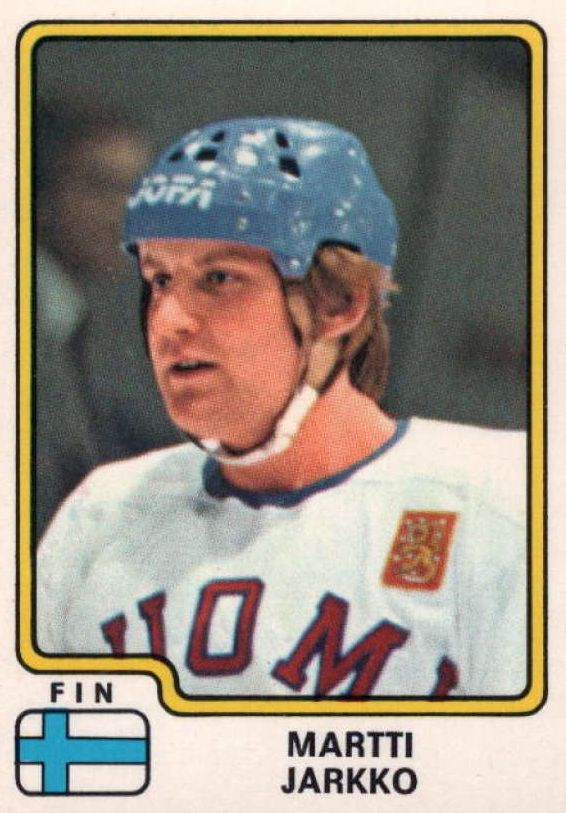
- Born: November 26, 1953 (age 71); Tampere, Finland
- Height: 5 ft 9 in (175 cm)
- Weight: 168 lb (76 kg; 12 st 0 lb)
- Position: Forward
- Shot: Right
- Played for: SM-liiga; Tappara; TPS; Bundesliga; Iserlohner EC; 2. Divisioona; Kiekko-67
- National team: Finland
- NHL draft: 235th overall, 1974; New York Islanders
- Playing career: 1972–1989

Martti Jarkko (born November 26, 1953, in Tampere, Finland) is a Finnish retired professional ice hockey player who played in the SM-liiga. He played for Tappara and TPS in Finland and Iserlohner EC in Germany. He was inducted into the Finnish Hockey Hall of Fame in 1993.

== Career statistics ==
			Regular season					Playoffs
Season	Team	League	GP	G	A	Pts	PIM	GP	G	A	Pts	PIM
1970–71	Tappara U20	Jr. A SM-sarja	15	12	10	22	14	—	—	—	—	—
1971–72	Tappara U20	Jr. A SM-sarja	16	30	27	57	14	—	—	—	—	—
1972–73	Tappara U20	Jr. A SM-sarja	5	—	—	—	—	—	—	—	—	—
1972–73	Tappara	SM-sarja	36	22	19	41	12	—	—	—	—	—
1973–74	Tappara	SM-sarja	36	27	15	42	35	—	—	—	—	—
1974–75	Tappara	SM-sarja	36	27	16	43	32	—	—	—	—	—
1975–76	Tappara	Liiga	35	26	38	64	64	4	0	1	1	11
1976–77	Tappara	Liiga	35	36	37	73	72	6	7	5	12	5
1977–78	Tappara	Liiga	36	29	19	48	51	8	6	8	14	21
1978–79	Tappara	Liiga	36	25	26	51	79	10	3	7	10	22
1979–80	HC TPS	Liiga	36	16	39	55	48	6	3	5	8	6
1980–81	HC TPS	Liiga	36	29	43	72	35	7	1	3	4	20
1981–82	HC TPS	Liiga	33	28	34	62	40	7	1	6	7	6
1982–83	ECD Sauerland	Germany	36	20	23	43	22	—	—	—	—	—
1983–84	ECD Sauerland	Germany	46	26	41	67	46	—	—	—	—	—
1984–85	HC TPS	Liiga	27	8	16	24	20	8	0	3	3	6
1985–86	ECD Iserlohn	Germany	43	21	48	69	44	—	—	—	—	—
1986–87	ECD Iserlohn	Germany	32	13	18	31	20	—	—	—	—	—
1987–88	Kiekko-67	2. Divisioona	27	31	40	71	69	—	—	—	—	—
1988–89	Kiekko-67	2. Divisoona	29	31	37	68	108	—	—	—	—	—
Liiga totals			274	197	252	449	409	56	21	38	59	97
Germany totals			157	80	130	210	132	—	—	—	—	—
