= Pekka Rautakallio =

Finnish ice hockey player and coach (born 1953)

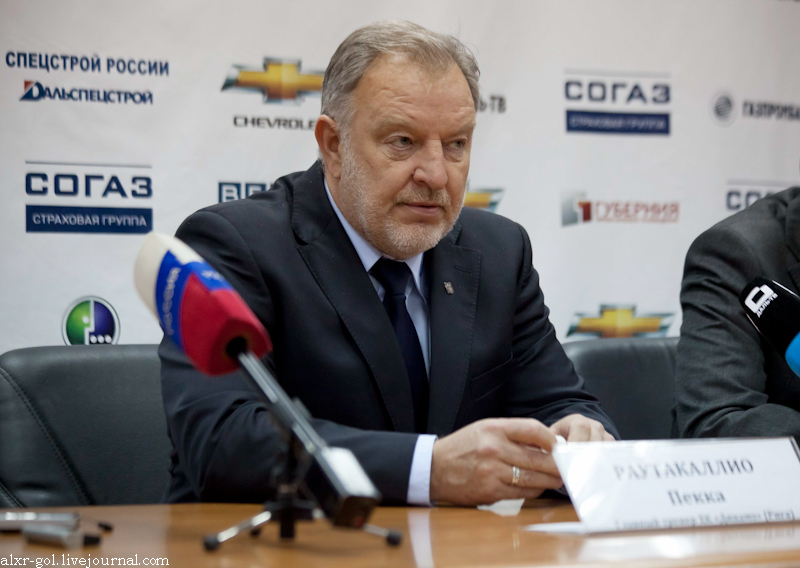
- Born: July 25, 1953 (age 73) Pori, Finland
- Height: 6 ft 3 in (191 cm)
- Weight: 214 lb (97 kg; 15 st 4 lb)
- Position: Defence
- Shot: Left
- Played for: Ässät; Phoenix Roadrunners; Atlanta Flames; Calgary Flames; HIFK Helsinki
- National team: Finland
- NHL draft: Undrafted
- Playing career: 1968–1989

Pekka Olavi "Rocky" Rautakallio (born July 25, 1953) is a Finnish former professional ice hockey defenceman and coach. He played 14 seasons in Finland's SM-sarja and SM-liiga between 1968 and 1987 for Ässät and HIFK Helsinki, during which he was a five-time Finnish All-Star. Rautakallio was a member of Ässät's championship team that won the Kanada-malja in 1978. He was named the best defenceman of the SM-liiga in 1978, 1979 and 1986; the league later named the award the Pekka Rautakallio trophy in his honour. Internationally, Rautakallio played with the Finnish national team in seven World Championships and two Canada Cup tournaments.

Rautakallio played North American professional hockey on two occasions. He spent two years with the Phoenix Roadrunners of the World Hockey Association (WHA) between 1975 and 1977. He returned in 1979 to join the Atlanta Flames of the National Hockey League (NHL) for one season before relocating to Canada with the franchise and playing two more with the Calgary Flames. Rautakallio played in the 1982 NHL All-Star Game, making him the first Finnish player in league history to appear in the game. He retired in 1989 after playing the final two seasons of his career with SC Rapperswil-Jona of the Swiss second division, after which he turned to coaching. Rautakallio has coached in Switzerland, Finland, and most recently Latvia with Dinamo Riga of the Kontinental Hockey League (KHL).

== Playing career ==
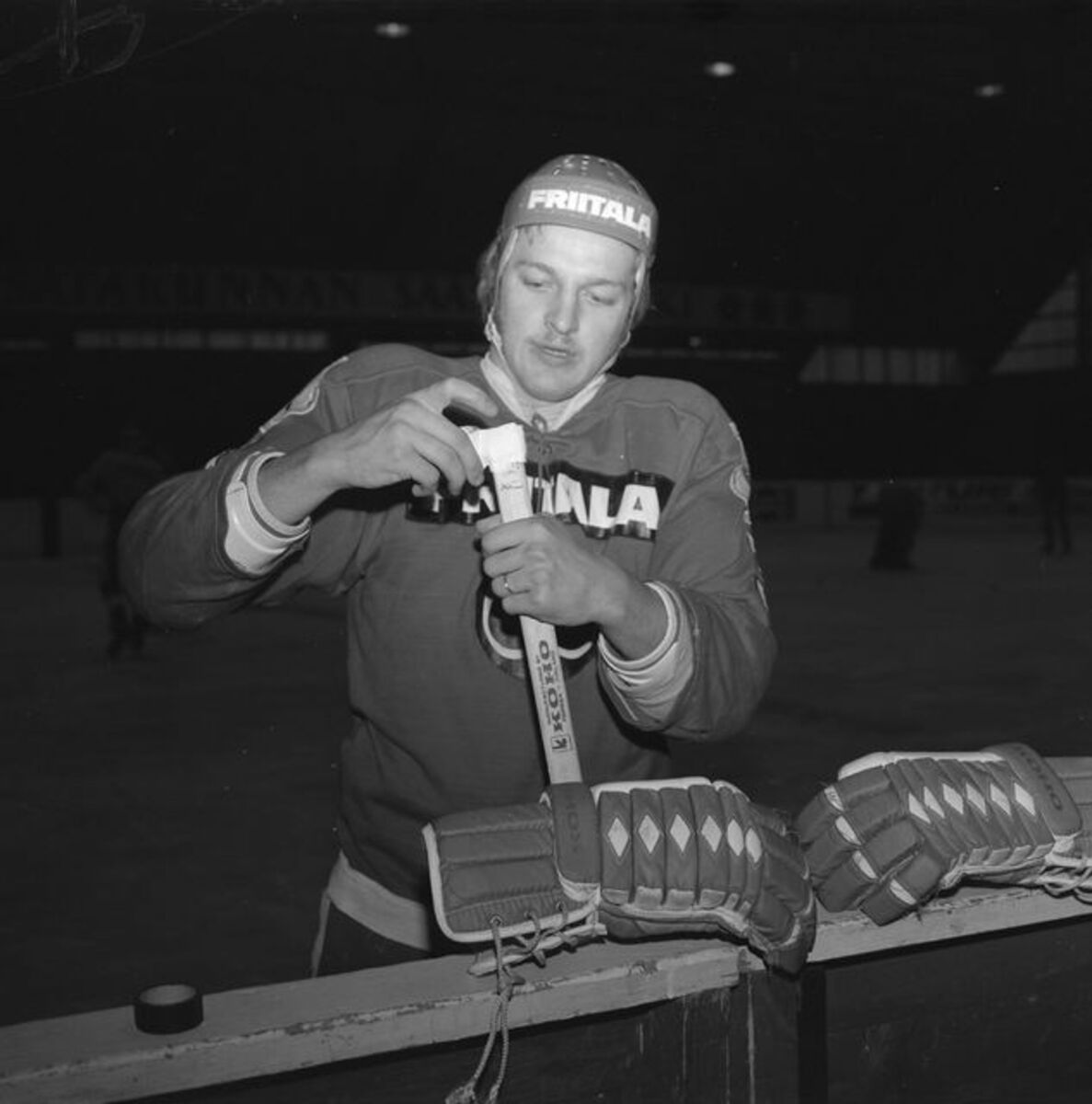
Pekka Rautakallio with the Porin Ässät.

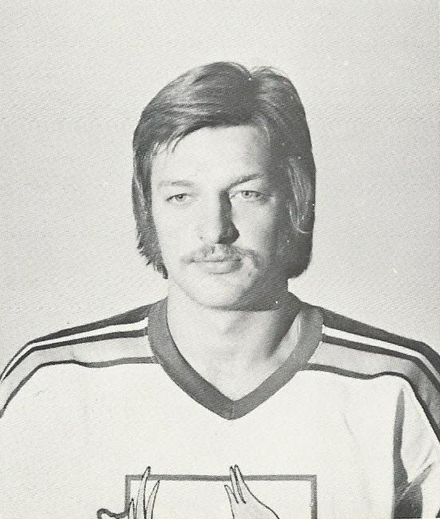
Pekka Rautakallio in 1975 photo for Phoenix Roadrunners

Pekka Rautakallio started his ice hockey career in local club of his hometown, Ässät in 1970. He also represented the club's football team. As a skilled and mobile defenceman, Rautakallio was soon noticed and he played on his first International tournament in 1972.

Rautakallio gained the attention of World Hockey Association (WHA) officials when the 1974 Summit Series team played an exhibition against the Finnish national team. The Phoenix Roadrunners thought to sign him to a contract that year, but hesitated out of fear that the challenge of a Finn adapting to life in Arizona on his own would be too great. They brought him over one year later, along with his countryman Lauri Mononen, and signed both to two-year contracts. Rautakallio recorded 50 points, including 11 goals, in 1975–76. He finished as the leading scorer among rookie defencemen, and fifth overall for all defencemen. He then fell to 35 points in 1976–77. The Roadrunners ceased operations following the season, and lacking other options in North America, Rautakallio returned to Finland.

Rautakallio returned to Ässät, which had joined the recently formed SM-liiga, and established himself as a top defenceman in the league. He was named defenceman of the year in both 1977–78 and 1978–79; the SM-liiga ultimately named the award the Pekka Rautakallio trophy in his honour. He recorded 37 points in 36 games in 1977–78, then improved to 25 goals and 53 points the following year. Ässät established its place as the SM-liiga's dominant team by winning the Kanada-malja as league champions in 1978 and reaching the final in 1979.

The Atlanta Flames brought Rautakallio back to North America in 1979 as general manager Cliff Fletcher signed him to a National Hockey League (NHL) contract. The Flames were impressed with the power of his shot and his speed; he finished his first NHL season with 30 points. Rautakallio relocated with the franchise when it moved to Canada and became the Calgary Flames in 1980–81. He led the team in scoring by a defenceman with 56 points.

The 1981–82 season was Rautakallio's best in the NHL. He again led the team's defencemen in scoring, and was fourth overall, with 68 points in 80 games. He played for the Campbell Conference team at the 1982 All-Star Game, and in doing so became the first Finn in NHL history to appear in the mid-season contest. However, he opted to return to Finland after the season as his sons were beginning school. He feared they were becoming too Canadian and wanted them to grow up in his homeland.

Rautakallio returned to play for HIFK, instead of Ässät, and served for a while as the captain of HIFK. Rautakallio retired from playing in 1989 after two seasons with SC Rapperswil-Jona in Switzerland. Rautakallio's number was retired by Ässät on 27 January 2024.

== Coaching career ==
Rautakallio remained with SC Rapperswil-Jona and joined the team as its coach. He later coached in Bern and Zurich. Returning to Finland, Rautakallio twice served in Espoo as head coach of Blues. His first term came during the 1998–99 SM-liiga season, when he was replaced mid-season by Hannu Saintula. Rautakallio's second term came when he was the replacement for Hannu Virta, who was sacked during the 2004–05 SM-liiga season. Most recently, he served as head coach of Dynamo Riga in the Kontinental Hockey League (KHL). Rautakallion joined the squad in 2011, but was dismissed midway through the 2012–13 season as Riga struggled.

== Career statistics ==
=== Regular season and playoffs ===
			Regular season					Playoffs
Season	Team	League	GP	G	A	Pts	PIM	GP	G	A	Pts	PIM
1968–69	Ässät	SM-sarja	10	2	1	3	0	—	—	—	—	—
1969–70	Ässät	SM-s	22	9	2	11	2	—	—	—	—	—
1970–71	Ässät	SM-s	31	6	5	11	18	—	—	—	—	—
1971–72	Ässät	SM-s	32	10	8	18	14	—	—	—	—	—
1972–73	Ässät	SM-s	34	23	12	35	21	—	—	—	—	—
1973–74	Ässät	SM-s	32	9	12	21	8	—	—	—	—	—
1974–75	Ässät	SM-s	36	9	13	22	19	—	—	—	—	—
1975–76	Phoenix Roadrunners	WHA	73	11	39	50	8	5	0	2	2	0
1976–77	Phoenix Roadrunners	WHA	78	4	31	35	8	—	—	—	—	—
1977–78	Ässät	SM-l	36	16	21	37	16	9	5	4	9	0
1978–79	Ässät	SM-l	36	25	28	53	26	8	5	9	14	2
1979–80	Atlanta Flames	NHL	79	5	25	30	18	4	0	1	1	2
1980–81	Calgary Flames	NHL	76	11	45	56	64	16	2	4	6	6
1981–82	Calgary Flames	NHL	80	17	51	68	40	3	0	0	0	0
1982–83	HIFK Helsinki	SM-l	36	16	16	32	16	9	6	4	10	10
1983–84	HIFK Helsinki	SM-l	33	9	21	30	10	2	0	2	2	0
1984–85	HIFK Helsinki	SM-l	29	12	18	30	18	—	—	—	—	—
1985–86	HIFK Helsinki	SM-l	34	13	23	36	8	10	3	0	3	10
1987–88	HIFK Helsinki	SM-l	42	15	25	40	10	5	5	1	6	5
1987–88	SC Rapperswil-Jona	NLB	33	19	14	33	18	3	1	1	2	0
1988–89	SC Rapperswil-Jona	NLB	12	1	4	5	0	1	0	0	0	0
SM-s/SM-l totals			443	174	205	379	186	43	24	20	44	27
WHA totals			151	15	70	85	16	5	0	2	2	0
NHL totals			235	33	121	154	122	23	2	5	7	8

=== International ===
Year	Team	Event	GP	G	A	Pts	PIM
1972	Finland	WC	4	0	0	0	0
1973	Finland	WC	7	0	0	0	4
1975	Finland	WC	10	0	3	3	0
1976	Finland	CC	5	2	2	4	2
1977	Finland	WC	10	3	4	7	2
1978	Finland	WC	10	4	3	7	2
1979	Finland	WC	7	2	1	3	2
1981	Finland	CC	5	0	1	1	2
1983	Finland	WC	10	1	7	8	0
Senior totals			68	12	21	33	14

== Awards and honours ==
Award	Year	Ref
EJC best defenceman	1971	
EJC All-Star	1971	
Finnish First All-Star Team	1974–75, 1977–78; 1978–79, 1982–83; 1985–86	
SM-liiga top defenceman	1977–78, 1978–79; 1985–86	
Matti Keinonen trophy	1977–78	
NHL All-Star Game	1982	

Preceded by Trophy created Tapio Levo	Winner of the Pekka Rautakallio trophy 1977–78, 1978–79; 1985–86	Succeeded by Reijo Ruotsalainen; Hannu Virta
Preceded by Trophy created	Winner of the Matti Keinonen trophy 1977–78	Succeeded by Veli-Pekka Ketola
Preceded by Matti Hagman	Captain of HIFK; 1985–1987	Succeeded by Matti Hagman
Preceded by Hannu Saintula; Hannu Virta	Head coach of Blues; 1998; 2004–05	Succeeded by Hannu Saintula; Kari Heikkilä
Preceded by Július Šupler	Head coach of Dinamo Riga; 2011–12	Succeeded by Artis Ābols
