= Tapio Koskinen =

Finnish ice hockey player (1953–2026)

- Born: 22 January 1953 Pori, Finland
- Died: 10 November 2026 (aged 73)
- Height: 5 ft 10 in (178 cm)
- Weight: 172 lb (78 kg; 12 st 4 lb)
- Position: Forward
- Played for: Ässät
- NHL draft: Undrafted
- Playing career: 1968–1983

Tapio Kalervo Koskinen (22 January 1953 – 10 November 2026) was a Finnish professional ice hockey player who played in the SM-liiga. He played for Ässät. Koskinen also competed in the 1976 Winter Olympics. He was inducted into the Finnish Hockey Hall of Fame in 1998.

Koskinen died on 10 November 2026, at the age of 73.

== Career statistics ==
			Regular season					Playoffs
Season	Team	League	GP	G	A	Pts	PIM	GP	G	A	Pts	PIM
1968–69	Ässät	SM-sarja	9	1	2	3	4	—	—	—	—	—
1969–70	Ässät	SM-sarja	22	9	7	16	4	—	—	—	—	—
1970–71	Ässät	SM-sarja	29	11	7	18	15	—	—	—	—	—
1971–72	Ässät	SM-sarja	32	15	7	22	2	—	—	—	—	—
1972–73	Ässät U20	Jr. A SM-sarja	3	—	—	—	—	—	—	—	—	—
1972–73	Ässät	SM-sarja	36	16	8	24	10	—	—	—	—	—
1973–74	Ässät	SM-sarja	36	17	9	26	33	—	—	—	—	—
1974–75	Ässät	SM-sarja	36	12	11	23	33	—	—	—	—	—
1975–76	Ässät	Liiga	36	27	18	45	72	4	4	0	4	2
1976–77	Ässät	Liiga	32	11	18	29	24	—	—	—	—	—
1977–78	Ässät	Liiga	36	12	30	42	21	9	2	5	7	22
1978–79	Ässät	Liiga	35	14	11	25	52	8	6	4	10	6
1979–80	Ässät	Liiga	35	14	14	28	18	6	0	1	1	12
1980–81	Ässät	Liiga	33	4	9	13	10	2	1	0	1	0
1981–82	Ässät	Liiga	33	12	14	26	16	9	1	5	6	14
1982–83	Ässät	Liiga	35	10	8	18	12	—	—	—	—	—
Liiga totals			275	104	122	226	225	38	14	15	29	56
