= Matti Hagman =

Finnish ice hockey player

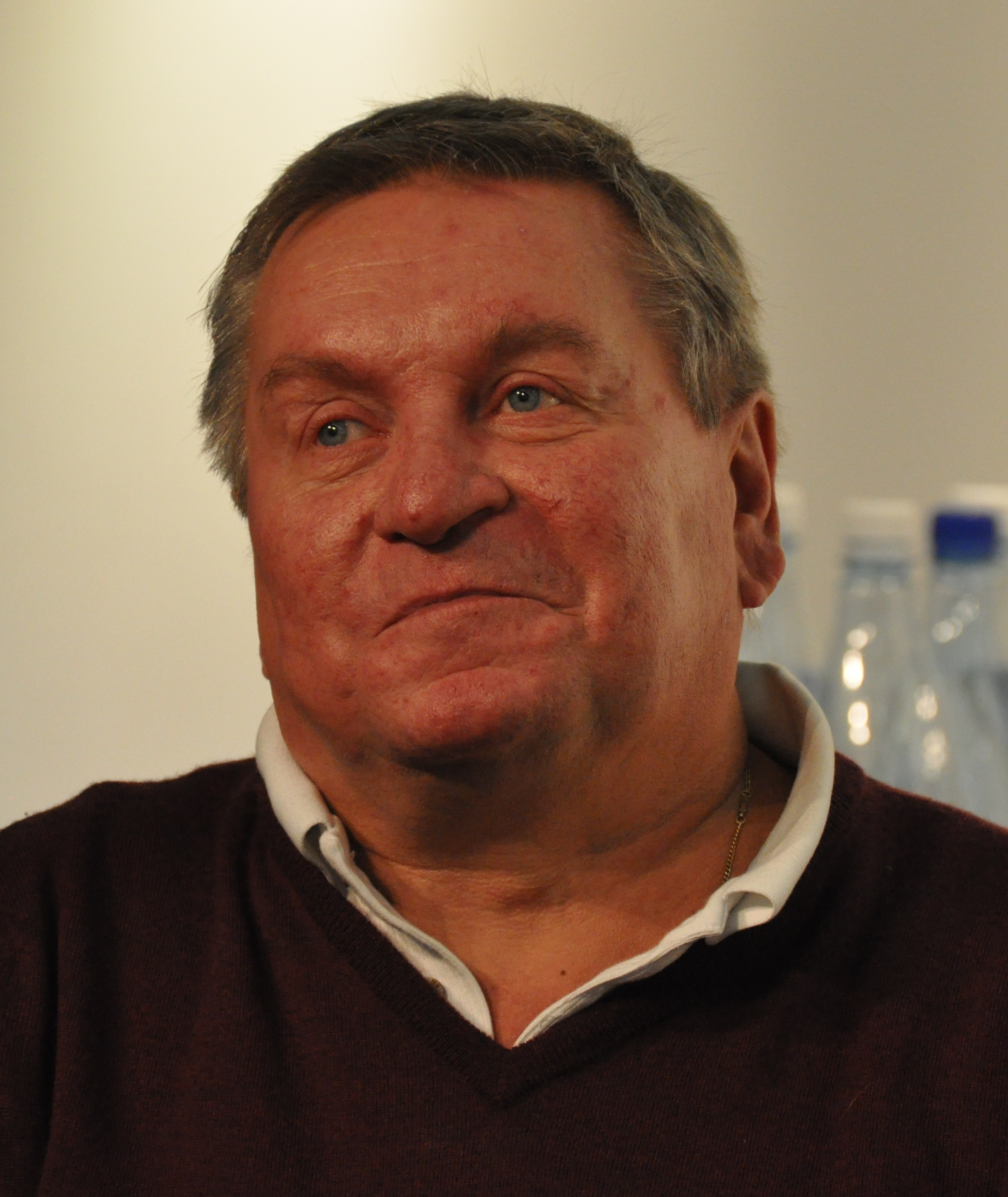
- Matti Hagman in 2011
- Born: 21 September 1955 Helsinki, Finland
- Died: 11 October 2016 (aged 61) Espoo, Finland
- Height: 6 ft 0 in (183 cm)
- Weight: 183 lb (83 kg; 13 st 1 lb)
- Position: Centre
- Shot: Left
- Played for: HIFK; Boston Bruins; Quebec Nordiques; Edmonton Oilers; EV Landshut; Hockey Reipas
- National team: Finland
- NHL draft: 104th overall, 1975; Boston Bruins
- WHA draft: 43rd overall, 1975; New England Whalers
- Playing career: 1972–1992

Matti Risto Tapio "Hakki" Hagman (21 September 1955 – 11 October 2016) was a Finnish professional ice hockey player. Hagman was the first Finnish-born and Finnish-trained player to play in the National Hockey League (NHL) and the first to play in a Stanley Cup Final. The first Finnish-born player in NHL was Albert Pudas, who never played hockey in Finland, having moved to Canada at the age of one. Hagman's jersey number 20 is also one of the eight retired numbers in HIFK, where he was a prominent player.

== NHL & WHA career ==
=== Boston Bruins (1976–1977) ===
Hagman played 237 NHL games over seven seasons. He debuted for the Boston Bruins on 7 October 1976 as they hosted the Minnesota North Stars. During his time in Boston, Hagman was coached by famous Canadian Head Coach Don Cherry. During his time with the Bruins, Hagman did not get much time on ice, but he did score well. During his first NHL season, Matti Hagman scored 28 points in 75 games, though he was playing on the third and fourth lines who do not have much offensive time on ice.

=== Quebec Nordiques (1977–1978) ===
Hagman joined the WHA Quebec Nordiques in 1977 after they purchased him from Boston. Despite scoring 3 assists in his first Nordiques game, Hagman returned to Finland in 1978, unhappy with playing abroad. He joined Helsinki IFK and went on to lead the Finnish league in points in 1979–80, 1982–83, 1983–84 and 1984–85. Hagman played 3 Canada Cups, as Finland finished sixth in each tournament (1976, 1981, and 1987). He also played on the fourth-place Finnish team in the 1976 Winter Olympics.

=== Edmonton Oilers (1980–1982) ===
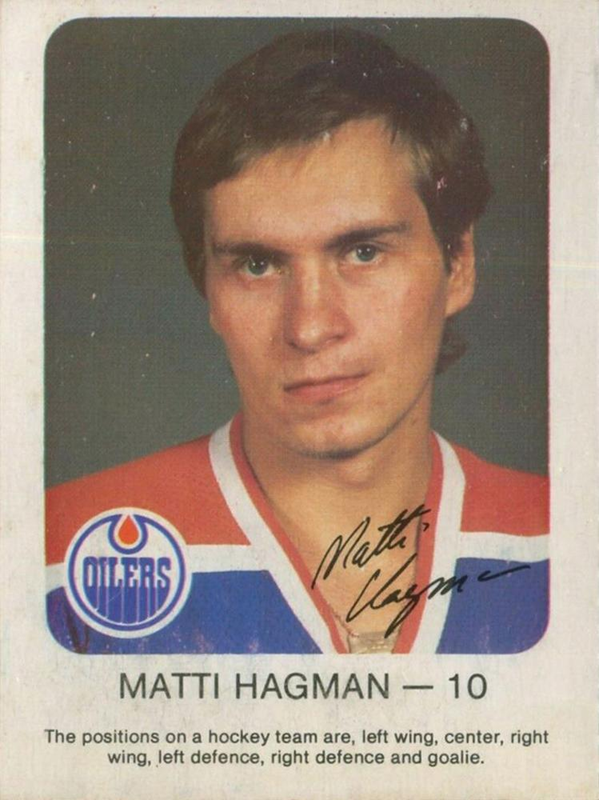
1981 card of Hagman for Edmonton Oilers

Hagman was a more prominent player on the Edmonton Oilers as they made the transition from WHA to NHL play. Though being originally a Centre, Hagman played left wing on the line with all-stars Mark Messier and Glenn Anderson during the 1980–81 campaign. Hagman moved from centre to left wing because the Oilers had two top centres: Mark Messier and Wayne Gretzky. An injury in training camp the next year limited Hagman to just a few games and spelt the end to his NHL career.

== After retirement ==
Medal record

Representing Finland

Men's ice hockey

European Junior Championships
Bronze medal – third place	1974 Switzerland	

Hagman was named head coach of Martigny (Switzerland) in 2004. Hagman also has coached numerous Finnish Ice Hockey teams.

== Personal life ==
Hagman was the father of Niklas Hagman, who also played in the NHL. He was also the brother-in-law of former indoor soccer star Kai Haaskivi.

Hagman's sister Riitta Salin won a gold medal in 400 metres at the 1974 European Athletics Championships.

Hagman died after a long illness in Espoo, Finland, on 11 October 2016. He died in hospital after seeking treatment a few days earlier.

== Career statistics ==
=== Regular season and playoffs ===
			Regular season					Playoffs
Season	Team	League	GP	G	A	Pts	PIM	GP	G	A	Pts	PIM
1972–73	HIFK	SM-s	13	11	5	16	7	—	—	—	—	—
1973–74	HIFK	FIN Jr	6	10	6	16	2	—	—	—	—	—
1973–74	HIFK	SM-s	35	30	9	39	20	—	—	—	—	—
1974–75	HIFK	SM-s	33	30	16	46	27	—	—	—	—	—
1975–76	HIFK	SM-l	36	24	34	58	39	4	1	1	2	5
1976–77	Boston Bruins	NHL	75	11	17	28	0	8	0	1	1	0
1977–78	Boston Bruins	NHL	15	4	1	5	2	—	—	—	—	—
1977–78	Quebec Nordiques	WHA	53	21	35	56	16	—	—	—	—	—
1978–79	HIFK	SM-l	36	20	37	57	53	6	1	6	7	4
1979–80	HIFK	SM-l	35	37	50	87	28	7	3	10	13	6
1980–81	Edmonton Oilers	NHL	75	20	33	53	16	9	4	1	5	6
1981–82	Edmonton Oilers	NHL	72	21	38	59	18	3	1	0	1	0
1982–83	HIFK	SM-l	36	23	41	64	50	9	9	8	17	11
1983–84	HIFK	SM-l	37	22	47	69	33	2	1	1	2	2
1984–85	HIFK	SM-l	34	23	44	67	24	—	—	—	—	—
1985–86	EV Landshut	1.GBun	36	25	49	74	24	3	1	2	3	2
1986–87	HIFK	SM-l	44	17	51	68	37	3	0	1	1	10
1987–88	HIFK	SM-l	44	17	43	60	37	6	4	5	9	6
1988–89	HIFK	SM-l	44	11	30	41	23	2	0	1	1	0
1989–90	Hockey-Reipas	FIN II	44	18	47	65	4	4	2	3	5	0
1990–91	Hockey-Reipas	SM-l	44	15	35	50	24	—	—	—	—	—
1991–92	HIFK	SM-l	42	8	20	28	20	8	1	3	4	2
SM-s totals			81	71	30	101	54	—	—	—	—	—
SM-l totals			432	217	432	649	368	47	20	36	56	46
NHL totals			237	56	89	145	36	20	5	2	7	6
WHA totals			53	21	35	56	16	—	—	—	—	—

=== International ===
Year	Team	Event	GP	G	A	Pts	PIM
1974	Finland	EJC	5	10	2	12	0
1975	Finland	WJC	5	3	2	5	9
1975	Finland	WC	9	2	3	5	4
1976	Finland	OLY	6	1	4	5	2
1976	Finland	WC	10	4	7	11	14
1976	Finland	CC	5	2	4	6	6
1978	Finland	WC	5	1	2	3	8
1981	Finland	CC	5	1	2	3	4
1983	Finland	WC	10	2	5	7	4
1987	Finland	CC	5	1	0	1	0
Junior totals			10	13	4	17	9
Senior totals			55	14	27	41	42

Preceded by Jukka Alkula	Winner of the Jarmo Wasama memorial trophy 1973–74	Succeeded by Markus Mattsson
Preceded by Kari Makkonen	Winner of the Aarne Honkavaara trophy 1979–80	Succeeded by Arto Javanainen
Preceded by Veli-Pekka Ketola; Reijo Leppänen	Winner of the Veli-Pekka Ketola trophy 1979–80; 1982–83, 1983–84, 1984–85	Succeeded by Reijo Leppänen; Arto Javanainen
Preceded by Heikki Riihiranta; Pekka Rautakallio	Captain of HIFK; 1983–85; 1987–89	Succeeded by Pekka Rautakallio; Simo Saarinen
