= Hannu Oksanen =

Finnish ice hockey player

Personal information
- Nationality: Finnish
- Born: 15 November 1957 (age 67); Ylöjärvi, Finland

Sport
- Sport: Ice hockey

Hannu Oksanen (born 15 November 1957) is a Finnish ice hockey player. He competed in the men's tournament at the 1984 Winter Olympics.

== Career statistics ==
=== Regular season and playoffs ===
			Regular season					Playoffs
Season	Team	League	GP	G	A	Pts	PIM	GP	G	A	Pts	PIM
1973–74	Ilves	FIN U18
1974–75	Ilves	FIN U20	14
1975–76	Ilves	FIN U20	36	33	20	53	74	—	—	—	—	—
1976–77	Ilves	FIN U20
1976–77	Ilves	SM-l	29	9	1	10	18	—	—	—	—	—
1977–78	Ilves	SM-l	36	17	12	29	28	7	1	1	2	8
1978–79	Ilves	SM-l	36	2	4	6	10	—	—	—	—	—
1979–80	Ilves	SM-l	11	0	1	1	4	7	1	1	2	8
1980–81	Ilves	SM-l	15	2	3	5	12	—	—	—	—	—
1981–82	KalPa	FIN.3	24	46	25	71	19	6	7	6	13	6
1982–83	Jokerit	SM-l	35	19	27	46	24	8	2	3	5	6
1983–84	Jokerit	SM-l	36	27	22	49	18	—	—	—	—	—
1984–85	Leksands IF	SEL	28	5	7	12	0	—	—	—	—	—
1985–86	Tappara	SM-l	35	15	25	40	14	8	4	6	10	0
1986–87	Tappara	SM-l	44	17	17	34	12	9	3	5	8	2
1987–88	Tappara	SM-l	18	2	5	7	0	10	2	2	4	2
1988–89	Tappara	SM-l	25	11	13	24	8	8	4	6	10	2
1989–90	KalPa	SM-l	34	7	15	22	6	6	1	3	4	5
1990–91	KalPa	SM-l	27	3	18	21	4	6	0	0	0	0
SM-l totals			381	131	163	294	158	62	17	26	43	25

=== International ===
Year	Team	Event	GP	G	A	Pts	PIM
1984	Finland	OG	6	0	0	0	0
1986	Finland	WC	10	0	1	1	2
Senior totals			16	0	1	1	2

"Hannu Oksanen". Elite Prospects.
