= Harri Tuohimaa =

Finnish ice hockey player

Personal information
- Nationality: Finnish
- Born: 21 November 1959 (age 65); Turku, Finland

Sport
- Sport: Ice hockey

Harri Tuohimaa (born 21 November 1959) is a Finnish ice hockey player. He competed in the men's tournament at the 1984 Winter Olympics.

== Career statistics ==
=== Regular season and playoffs ===
			Regular season					Playoffs
Season	Team	League	GP	G	A	Pts	PIM	GP	G	A	Pts	PIM
1977–78	Lukko	SM-l	39	19	16	35	26	—	—	—	—	—
1978–79	Lukko	SM-l	36	15	21	36	26	—	—	—	—	—
1979–80	Lukko	SM-l	36	19	19	38	34	—	—	—	—	—
1980–81	Lukko	SM-l	36	15	18	33	22	—	—	—	—	—
1981–82	HIFK	SM-l	36	13	14	27	20	8	2	2	4	2
1982–83	HIFK	SM-l	36	18	14	32	11	9	3	2	5	16
1983–84	HIFK	SM-l	37	16	36	52	26	2	1	2	3	0
1984–85	HIFK	SM-l	36	23	15	38	14	—	—	—	—	—
1985–86	HIFK	SM-l	36	17	26	43	16	10	2	3	5	4
1986–87	Zürcher SC	SUI.2	20	18	10	28	10	4	6	2	8	4
1987–88	Zürcher SC	SUI.2	35	51	32	83	18	2	0	0	0	0
1988–89	HIFK	SM-l	40	22	11	33	16	2	0	0	0	4
1989–90	HIFK	SM-l	43	16	25	41	26	2	0	1	1	2
1990–91	HIFK	SM-l	44	19	17	36	12	3	0	2	2	0
1991–92	HIFK	SM-l	34	6	12	18	8	9	5	3	8	2
SM-l totals			489	218	244	462	257	45	13	15	28	30

=== International ===
Year	Team	Event	GP	G	A	Pts	PIM
1977	Finland	EJC	6	5	4	9	8
1978	Finland	WJC	6	1	4	5	4
1979	Finland	WJC	6	4	0	4	4
1984	Finland	OG	6	3	2	5	8
1985	Finland	WC	9	1	2	3	4
Junior totals			18	10	8	18	16
Senior totals			15	4	4	8	12

"Harri Tuohimaa". Elite Prospects.
