= Mikko Leinonen =

Finnish ice hockey player and executive

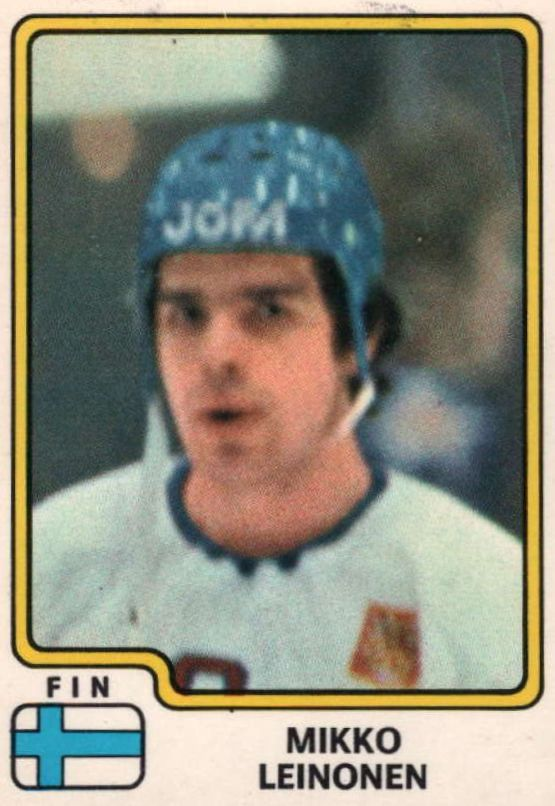
- Born: July 15, 1955 (age 71) Tampere, Finland
- Height: 6 ft 0 in (183 cm)
- Weight: 175 lb (79 kg; 12 st 7 lb)
- Position: Centre
- Shot: Left
- Played for: New York Rangers; Washington Capitals
- National team: Finland
- NHL draft: Undrafted
- Playing career: 1974–1987

Simo Mikko Yrjänä Leinonen (born July 15, 1955) is a Finnish former ice hockey player and currently the chief executive of Finnish elite league SM-liiga team Tappara. He played 162 games in the National Hockey League (NHL) for the New York Rangers and Washington Capitals.

== Achievements ==
- 1979 he became Swedish Elite series champion with Modo Hockey
- At age twenty-four, Leinonen competed for the Finnish team in the 1980 Winter Olympics and scored an impressive 3 goals and 3 assists during the tournament.
- He won the 1983-84 CHL Championship (Adams Cup) as a member of the Tulsa Oilers team coached by Tom Webster.
- In 1982, Leinonen set the NHL record for most assists (6) in a playoff game. The record was equalled by Wayne Gretzky in 1987.

== Career statistics ==
=== Regular season and playoffs ===
| | | | Regular season | | | | | Playoffs |
| Season | Team | League | GP | G | A | Pts | PIM | GP | G | A | Pts | PIM |
|---|---|---|---|---|---|---|---|---|---|---|---|---|
| 1971–72 | Tappara | FIN Jr. | 12 | — | — | — | — | — | — | — | — | — |
| 1972–73 | Tappara | FIN Jr. | 17 | 30 | 12 | 42 | 24 | — | — | — | — | — |
| 1973–74 | Tappara | SM-s | 35 | 26 | 13 | 39 | 30 | — | — | — | — | — |
| 1974–75 | Tappara | SM-s | 34 | 17 | 11 | 28 | 14 | — | — | — | — | — |
| 1975–76 | Tappara | SM-l | 36 | 23 | 24 | 47 | 42 | 4 | 1 | 1 | 2 | 8 |
| 1976–77 | Tappara | SM-l | 33 | 23 | 24 | 47 | 43 | 6 | 7 | 4 | 11 | 6 |
| 1977–78 | Modo AIK | SEL | 36 | 16 | 29 | 45 | 51 | 2 | 0 | 0 | 0 | 4 |
| 1978–79 | Modo AIK | SEL | 35 | 10 | 20 | 30 | 32 | 6 | 2 | 7 | 9 | 4 |
| 1979–80 | Kärpät | SM-l | 36 | 32 | 20 | 52 | 40 | 6 | 2 | 2 | 4 | 4 |
| 1980–81 | Kärpät | SM-l | 36 | 16 | 36 | 52 | 43 | 12 | 3 | 7 | 10 | 14 |
| 1981–82 | New York Rangers | NHL | 53 | 11 | 20 | 31 | 18 | 7 | 1 | 6 | 7 | 20 |
| 1981–82 | Springfield Indians | AHL | 6 | 4 | 2 | 6 | 2 | — | — | — | — | — |
| 1982–83 | New York Rangers | NHL | 78 | 17 | 34 | 51 | 23 | 7 | 1 | 3 | 4 | 4 |
| 1983–84 | New York Rangers | NHL | 28 | 3 | 23 | 26 | 28 | 5 | 0 | 2 | 2 | 4 |
| 1983–84 | Tulsa Oilers | CHL | 33 | 15 | 23 | 38 | 38 | — | — | — | — | — |
| 1984–85 | Kärpät | SM-l | 35 | 19 | 15 | 34 | 70 | 7 | 2 | 3 | 5 | 6 |
| 1984–85 | Washington Capitals | NHL | 3 | 0 | 1 | 1 | 2 | 1 | 0 | 0 | 0 | 0 |
| 1985–86 | Kärpät | SM-l | 36 | 6 | 17 | 23 | 40 | 5 | 1 | 1 | 2 | 0 |
| 1986–87 | KalPa | SM-l | 8 | 4 | 0 | 4 | 30 | — | — | — | — | — |
| SM-l totals | | | 220 | 123 | 136 | 259 | 308 | 40 | 16 | 18 | 34 | 38 |
| SEL totals | | | 71 | 29 | 46 | 75 | 83 | 8 | 2 | 7 | 9 | 8 |
| NHL totals | | | 162 | 31 | 78 | 109 | 71 | 20 | 2 | 11 | 13 | 28 |

=== International ===
| Year | Team | Event | GP | G | A | Pts | PIM |
|---|---|---|---|---|---|---|---|
| 1973 | Finland | EJC | 5 | 1 | 1 | 2 | 4 |
| 1974 | Finland | WJC | 5 | 4 | 1 | 5 | 2 |
| 1978 | Finland | WC | 10 | 0 | 1 | 1 | 4 |
| 1979 | Finland | WC | 8 | 1 | 1 | 2 | 4 |
| 1980 | Finland | OG | 7 | 6 | 4 | 10 | 0 |
| 1981 | Finland | CC | 5 | 0 | 0 | 0 | 0 |
| 1981 | Finland | WC | 8 | 5 | 3 | 8 | 2 |
| Junior totals | | | 10 | 5 | 2 | 7 | 6 |
| Senior totals | | | 38 | 12 | 9 | 21 | 10 |
