= Jukka Koskilahti =

Finnish ice hockey player

- Born: 23 May 1954 Turku, Finland
- Height: 5 ft 9 in (175 cm)
- Weight: 168 lb (76 kg; 12 st 0 lb)
- Position: Left wing
- Played for: Kiekko-67; HC TPS; HV71; Modo AIK; Mölndal Hockey
- National team: Finland
- Playing career: 1973–1984

Jukka Markus Koskilahti (born 23 May 1954) is a Finnish former ice hockey player who played for Sweden clubs HV 71 (1979–1980) and Modo AIK (1980–1982) as well as TPS Turku.

== Career statistics ==
			Regular season					Playoffs
Season	Team	League	GP	G	A	Pts	PIM	GP	G	A	Pts	PIM
1971–72	Kiekko-67 U20	Jr. A SM-sarja	8	9	4	13	4	—	—	—	—	—
1972–73	Kiekko-67 U20	Jr. A SM-sarja	9	4	6	10	34	—	—	—	—	—
1973–74	HC TPS	SM-sarja	35	7	2	9	36	—	—	—	—	—
1974–75	HC TPS	SM-sarja	22	4	2	6	8	—	—	—	—	—
1975–76	HC TPS	SM-liiga	36	7	2	9	17	4	1	0	1	2
1976–77	HC TPS	SM-liiga	31	12	14	26	18	8	1	0	1	9
1977–78	HC TPS	SM-liiga	36	17	10	27	19	8	2	3	5	4
1978–79	HC TPS	SM-liiga	36	14	12	26	4	8	4	5	9	21
1979–80	HV71	Elitserien	32	12	3	15	14	—	—	—	—	—
1980–81	Modo AIK	Elitserien	36	8	4	12	10	—	—	—	—	—
1981–82	Modo AIK	Elitserien	13	2	4	6	4	—	—	—	—	—
1982–83	HC TPS	SM-liiga	33	5	9	14	2	3	2	0	2	0
1983–84	HC TPS	SM-liiga	35	8	2	10	2	10	0	0	0	0
1984–85	Mölndals IF	Division 1	30	22	11	33	20	—	—	—	—	—
SM-liiga totals			207	63	49	112	62	41	10	8	18	36
