= Kari Takko =

Finnish ice hockey player (born 1962)

- Born: 23 June 1962 (age 64) Uusikaupunki, Finland
- Height: 6 ft 2 in (188 cm)
- Weight: 192 lb (87 kg; 13 st 10 lb)
- Position: Goaltender
- Caught: Right
- Played for: Minnesota North Stars; Edmonton Oilers; Ässät; HV71
- National team: Finland
- NHL draft: 200th overall, 1981; Quebec Nordiques; 97th overall, 1984; Minnesota North Stars
- Playing career: 1978–2000

Kari Maurits Takko (born 23 June 1962) is a Finnish former professional ice hockey goaltender. He played in the National Hockey League (NHL) between 1986 and 1991, and in the Finnish SM-liiga between 1979 and 1985, and again from 1991 to 1997. Internationally Takko played for the Finnish national team at several tournaments, including the 1984 Winter Olympics. He currently works for Porin Ässät as a player coordinator. Takko is also the Director of European Scouting for the Dallas Stars.

== Playing career ==
Takko played six seasons in the NHL, serving as a backup to Don Beaupre, Jon Casey and Bill Ranford. He was selected in the tenth round of the 1981 NHL entry draft, 200th overall, by the Quebec Nordiques, but was unable to come to contract terms. He re-entered the 1984 NHL entry draft and was this time drafted by the Minnesota North Stars.

Takko started his SM-liiga career in Ässät during the 1978–79 season, and played there for seven seasons (1978–1985). Takko went to the NHL after the 1984–85 season. He was signed by the Minnesota North Stars, and played with them for a total of six seasons (1985–1991). During the 1990–91 season Takko was traded to the Edmonton Oilers for Bruce Bell, making it the "Takko Bell Trade", a play on the fast food restaurant chain. Takko played for the rest of his NHL career in Edmonton. After retiring from NHL play, he played nine more seasons in Europe representing Ässät (1991–1996) in the SM-liiga, and HV71 (1997–2000) in the Elitserien. Takko retired from playing after the 1999–2000 season.

Takko also played internationally for Finland, appearing for their national team a total of 104 times. He is currently the Director of European Scouting for the Dallas Stars.

== Career statistics ==
=== Regular season and playoffs ===
			Regular season									Playoffs
Season	Team	League	GP	W	L	T	MIN	GA	SO	GAA	SV%	GP	W	L	MIN	GA	SO	GAA	SV%
1977–78	Porin Ässät U20	FIN U20	—	—	—	—	—	—	—	—	—	—	—	—	—	—	—	—	—
1978–79	Porin Ässät U20	FIN U20	—	—	—	—	—	—	—	—	—	—	—	—	—	—	—	—	—
1978–79	Porin Ässät	FIN	2	—	—	—	120	2	0	1.00	.905	—	—	—	—	—	—	—	—
1979–80	Porin Ässät	FIN	2	—	—	—	120	4	0	2.00	,873	—	—	—	—	—	—	—	—
1980–81	Porin Ässät	FIN	4	—	—	—	240	16	0	4.00	.843	—	—	—	—	—	—	—	—
1981–82	Porin Ässät	FIN	14	—	—	—	840	60	0	4.28	.853	—	—	—	—	—	—	—	—
1982–83	Porin Ässät	FIN	21	—	—	—	1260	77	0	3.66	.883	—	—	—	—	—	—	—	—
1983–84	Porin Ässät	FIN	32	—	—	—	1920	102	3	3.19	.890	9	—	—	540	37	0	4.11	—
1983–84	Olympiajoukkue	FIN	3	—	—	—	180	11	0	3.66	.890	—	—	—	—	—	—	—	—
1984–85	Porin Ässät	FIN	35	—	—	—	2100	123	3	3.51	.887	8	—	—	480	32	0	4.00	.881
1985–86	Minnesota North Stars	NHL	1	0	1	0	60	3	0	3.01	.909	—	—	—	—	—	—	—	—
1985–86	Springfield Indians	AHL	43	18	19	3	2286	161	1	4.05	—	—	—	—	—	—	—	—	—
1986–87	Minnesota North Stars	NHL	38	13	18	4	2067	119	0	3.46	.887	—	—	—	—	—	—	—	—
1986–87	Springfield Indians	AHL	5	3	2	0	300	16	1	3.20	—	—	—	—	—	—	—	—	—
1987–88	Minnesota North Stars	NHL	37	8	19	6	1917	143	1	4.48	.866	—	—	—	—	—	—	—	—
1988–89	Minnesota North Stars	NHL	32	8	15	4	1604	93	0	3.48	.899	3	0	1	105	7	0	4.00	.873
1989–90	Minnesota North Stars	NHL	21	4	12	0	1012	68	0	4.03	.858	1	0	0	4	0	0	0.00	1.000
1989–90	Kalamazoo Wings	IHL	1	0	1	0	59	5	0	5.08	—	—	—	—	—	—	—	—	—
1990–91	Minnesota North Stars	NHL	2	0	2	0	119	12	0	6.06	.838	—	—	—	—	—	—	—	—
1990–91	Kalamazoo Wings	IHL	5	4	1	0	300	10	1	2.00	—	—	—	—	—	—	—	—	—
1990–91	Edmonton Oilers	NHL	11	4	4	0	530	37	0	4.20	.867	—	—	—	—	—	—	—	—
1991–92	Porin Ässät	FIN	28	13	11	2	1628	98	1	3.61	.885	6	3	3	359	17	1	2.84	.908
1992–93	Porin Ässät	FIN	45	21	16	8	2723	138	3	3.04	.913	7	4	3	430	29	0	4.05	.886
1993–94	Porin Ässät	FIN	48	25	16	7	2920	145	3	2.98	.907	5	2	3	296	20	0	4.06	.884
1994–95	Porin Ässät	FIN	49	20	18	11	2963	157	1	3.18	.904	7	4	3	425	18	3	2.54	.919
1995–96	Porin Ässät	FIN	42	18	21	4	2509	128	2	3.06	.904	3	0	3	178	12	0	4.05	.880
1996–97	Porin Ässät	FIN	42	16	16	9	2492	139	1	3.35	—	4	1	3	217	15	0	4.14	.856
1997–98	HV 71	SWE	39	—	—	—	2340	122	5	3.13	.880	5	—	—	314	11	2	2.10	.934
1998–99	HV 71	SWE	40	—	—	—	2475	107	5	2.59	.888	—	—	—	—	—	—	—	—
1999–00	HV 71	SWE	39	—	—	—	2271	95	4	2.51	.892	3	—	—	179	7	0	2.35	.899
NHL totals			142	37	71	14	7305	475	1	3.90	.878	4	0	1	109	7	0	3.86	.873

=== International ===
Year	Team	Event	GP	W	L	T	MIN	GA	SO	GAA	SV%
1979	Finland	EJC	4	—	—	—	240	8	0	2.00	—
1981	Finland	WJC	4	2	1	1	240	12	0	3.00	—
1982	Finland	WJC	7	5	2	0	420	29	0	4.14	—
1983	Finland	WC	6	—	—	—	360	25	0	4.17	—
1984	Finland	OLY	5	—	—	—	195	19	0	5.85	.891
1985	Finland	WC	7	—	—	—	420	23	0	3.28	—
1987	Finland	CC	5	0	5	0	280	22	0	4.71	.877
1991	Finland	WC	3	2	1	0	178	9	0	3.03	.877
1997	Finland	WC	2	1	1	0	119	7	0	3.53	.885
Junior totals			15	—	—	—	900	49	0	3.27	—
Senior totals			29	—	—	—	1552	105	0	4.06	—

== Awards ==
- Silver medal at the World Junior Championships in 1981.
- Bronze medal at the World Junior Championships in 1982.
- Named Best Goalie of SM-liiga in 1985 and 1994.
