= Markus Mattsson =

Finnish ice hockey player

- Born: July 30, 1957 (age 67); Suoniemi, Finland
- Height: 6 ft 0 in (183 cm)
- Weight: 182 lb (83 kg; 13 st 0 lb)
- Position: Goaltender
- Caught: Right
- Played for: Winnipeg Jets; Minnesota North Stars; Los Angeles Kings; Quebec Nordiques; Ilves; Tappara
- National team: Finland
- NHL draft: 87th overall, 1977; New York Islanders
- WHA draft: 57th overall, 1977; Houston Aeros
- Playing career: 1973–1987

Markus Rainer Mattsson (born July 30, 1957) is a Finnish former professional ice hockey goaltender. He was one of the first goaltenders in the National Hockey League from Finland. He is also the goalie who ended Wayne Gretzky's 51-game point streak in 1983–84.

Markus has a son, Niklas, who played ice hockey for Ilves and Suomi-sarja-team HC Montreal Tampere.

== Career statistics ==
=== Regular season and playoffs ===
			Regular season									Playoffs
Season	Team	League	GP	W	L	T	MIN	GA	SO	GAA	SV%	GP	W	L	MIN	GA	SO	GAA	SV%
1974–75	Ilves	FIN	15	—	—	—	—	47	0	—	.905	—	—	—	—	—	—	—	—
1975–76	Ilves	FIN	16	—	—	—	—	63	2	—	.895	—	—	—	—	—	—	—	—
1976–77	Ilves	FIN	32	—	—	—	—	132	1	—	.893	—	—	—	—	—	—	—	—
1977–78	Tulsa Oilers	CHL	2	1	1	0	92	6	0	3.91	.867	—	—	—	—	—	—	—	—
1977–78	Quebec Nordiques	WHA	6	1	3	0	266	30	0	6.77	.819	—	—	—	—	—	—	—	—
1977–78	Winnipeg Jets	WHA	10	4	5	0	511	30	0	3.52	.883	—	—	—	—	—	—	—	—
1978–79	Winnipeg Jets	WHA	52	25	21	3	2990	181	0	3.63	.883	—	—	—	—	—	—	—	—
1979–80	Winnipeg Jets	NHL	21	5	11	4	1196	65	2	3.26	.887	—	—	—	—	—	—	—	—
1979–80	Tulsa Oilers	CHL	20	10	7	2	1196	56	2	2.81	.897	—	—	—	—	—	—	—	—
1980–81	Winnipeg Jets	NHL	31	3	21	4	1699	128	1	4.52	.866	—	—	—	—	—	—	—	—
1980–81	Tulsa Oilers	CHL	5	3	2	0	298	10	1	2.01	.925	—	—	—	—	—	—	—	—
1981–82	Tulsa Oilers	CHL	50	26	23	0	2963	195	0	3.95	.864	1	0	1	60	7	0	7.00	—
1982–83	Minnesota North Stars	NHL	2	1	1	0	100	6	1	3.60	.914	—	—	—	—	—	—	—	—
1982–83	Los Angeles Kings	NHL	19	5	5	4	896	65	1	4.35	.857	—	—	—	—	—	—	—	—
1983–84	Los Angeles Kings	NHL	19	7	8	2	1096	79	1	4.32	.851	—	—	—	—	—	—	—	—
1983–84	New Haven Nighthawks	AHL	31	16	10	1	1701	110	0	3.88	.885	—	—	—	—	—	—	—	—
1984–85	Tappara	FIN	26	—	—	—	—	101	0	4.03	.885	—	—	—	—	—	—	—	—
1985–86	Tappara	FIN	33	—	—	—	—	107	—	3.16	.905	8	—	—	—	17	—	1.38	.943
1986–87	Tappara	FIN	33	19	11	3	1904	98	3	3.09	.890	9	7	2	539	27	1	3.00	.904
WHA totals			68	30	28	3	3767	241	0	3.84	.877	—	—	—	—	—	—	—	—
NHL totals			92	21	46	14	4988	343	6	4.13	.867	—	—	—	—	—	—	—	—

=== International ===
Year	Team	Event	GP	W	L	T	MIN	GA	SO	GAA	SV%
1974	Finland	EJC	3	—	—	—	180	9	0	3.00	—
1975	Finland	WJC	5	1	3	1	300	14	0	2.80	—
1976	Finland	EJC	4	—	—	—	240	16	0	4.00	.916
1976	Finland	CC	2	1	1	0	80	14	0	11.00	.745
1981	Finland	CC	2	0	2	0	120	15	0	7.50	.795
Senior totals			4	1	1	0	200	29	0	8.70	—

Preceded by Matti Hagman	Winner of the Jarmo Wasama memorial trophy 1974-75	Succeeded by Kari Makkonen
