= Reijo Ruotsalainen =

Finnish ice hockey player

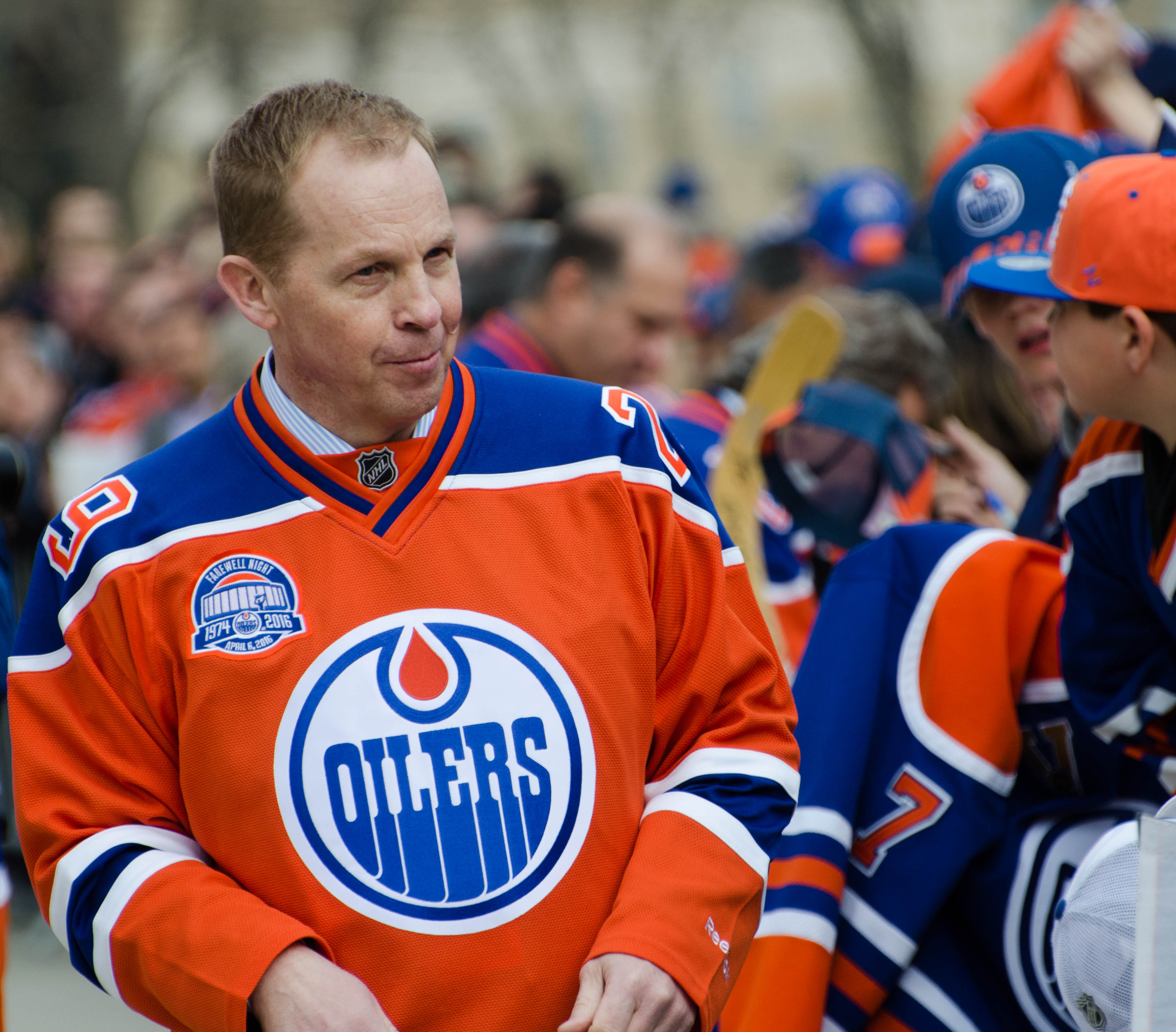
- Ruotsalainen in 2016
- Born: April 1, 1960 (age 65) Oulu, Finland
- Height: 5 ft 8 in (173 cm)
- Weight: 165 lb (75 kg; 11 st 11 lb)
- Position: Defence
- Shot: Right
- Played for: Oulun Kärpät; New York Rangers; SC Bern; Edmonton Oilers; HV71; New Jersey Devils; Tappara; KalPa; Zürcher SC
- National team: Finland
- NHL draft: 119th overall, 1980; New York Rangers
- Playing career: 1975–1998

Reijo Ruotsalainen (born April 1, 1960) is a Finnish former professional ice hockey defenceman. He was twice named Finland's top defenceman, and won two Stanley Cups with the Edmonton Oilers, in 1987 and 1990.

== Playing career ==
Ruotsalainen started his career in Kärpät. Nicknamed "Reksa" or "Rexi", he was recognized as a talented defenseman while playing for Kärpät junior teams. Kärpät was promoted to SM-liiga from 1. Divisioona for the 1977–78 season, and Ruotsalainen played 30 games and posted 23 points in his first SM-liiga season. During the 1979–80 season, Ruotsalainen and Kärpät played in the SM-liiga Playoffs, but were eliminated from the Finals by HIFK. Kärpät, however, won the bronze medal series, 2–0, against TPS. The 1980–81 season proved to be a breakthrough for Ruotsalainen. Kärpät made the finals against Tappara, coming from behind in the fifth and decisive game, winning the game 5–2. After his first Championship in SM-liiga, Ruotsalainen headed to National Hockey League (NHL).

Ruotsalainen was signed by the New York Rangers of the NHL in 1981. During his debut season, he scored 56 points in 78 games. Initially paired on defense with Barry Beck, Ruotsalainen was eventually moved to forward. Coach Herb Brooks said Ruotsalainen was the best skater in NHL. Ruotsalainen's fluid skating helped him compensate for his lack of size. Ruotsalainen had his NHL-career high in points during the 1984–85 NHL season, leading the Rangers in scoring with 73 points in 80 games. Ruotsalainen played in the 1986 NHL All-Star game. Unhappy with Rangers' head coach Ted Sator's less fluid North American style of play, Ruotsalainen was one of three players who left the team.

Ruotsalainen's contract expired after the conclusion of the 1985–86 NHL season, and he accepted an offer from SC Bern of the Swiss Nationalliga A. Ruotsalainen played in 35 games and scored 53 points for SC Bern before returning to the NHL.

Ruotsalainen was signed by the Edmonton Oilers for the remainder of the 1986–87 NHL season and was given a spot on defense. The Oilers went on to win the Stanley Cup at the end of the season, and Ruotsalainen's name was added to the Cup for the first time.

Ruotsalainen next signed with HV71 in Sweden, with whom Ruotsalainen scored 32 points in 40 games.

After his single season in Sweden, Ruotsalainen was again contracted by SC Bern, playing a single season for them, scoring 46 points in 36 games.

Ruotsalainen returned to the NHL after a two-season absence, starting the 1989–90 NHL season with the New Jersey Devils. He was traded to Edmonton after 31 games, leading to winning his second Stanley Cup, as the Oilers won the Cup for the fifth time, the first without Wayne Gretzky.

Ruotsalainen returned to Europe and played for SC Bern, yet again, in a tenure that lasted for three seasons. Ruotsalainen scored 38 points during his first season back in Bern.

Ruotsalainen returned to his "home team" when he was contracted by Kärpät in 1993, by which time had been relegated back to 1. Divisioona. Ruotsalainen played four games for Kärpät, scoring 6 points. Ruotsalainen was acquired by SM-liiga team Tappara for reminder of the 1993–94 season. Ruotsalainen played six regular season games with Tappara and scored 6 points, and 3 points in 9 playoff games, as Tappara was eliminated by TPS in the semifinals.

After his season in Finland, Ruotsalainen accepted a contract offer from SC Bern for the 1994–95 season, and played 19 games and had 10 points.

Ruotsalainen returned to Finland for the 1995–96 season and played for KalPa with 8 points in 16 games. He was contracted mid-season to Swiss team ZSC Lions, where he played 18 games with 15 points.

After his season in Zürich, Ruotsalainen ended his career in Finland, playing for Kärpät in the Finnish 1. Divisioona for two more seasons, scoring 31 points in 44 games during his Final season.

Ruotsalainen ended his career in 1998. His jersey #10 is currently retired by Kärpät.

== International play ==
Reijo Ruotsalainen
Medal record

Representing Finland

Men's ice hockey

Olympic Games
Silver medal – second place	1988 Calgary	

World Junior Championships
Silver medal – second place	1980 Finland	

European Junior Championships
Bronze medal – third place	1976 Czechoslovakia	

Ruotsalainen played for the Finnish junior national team from 1975 to 1980, winning bronze at the European Junior Championships in 1976 and silver at the World Junior Championships in 1980, where he together with Tomas Jonsson were appointed best defencemen of tournament. He played for the Finnish national team at the IIHF World Championships in 1978, 1979, 1981, 1985, and 1989, the 1988 Winter Olympics (winning silver) and the 1981 and the 1987 Canada Cups.

Ruotsalainen became a coach after his playing career. He was an assistant coach with the Miami Matadors of the ECHL during their only season in 1998–99.

He is a member of the Finnish Ice Hockey Hall of Fame.

== Career statistics ==
=== Regular season and playoffs ===
			Regular season					Playoffs
Season	Team	League	GP	G	A	Pts	PIM	GP	G	A	Pts	PIM
1975–76	Kärpät	FIN.2	34	9	15	24	12	—	—	—	—	—
1976–77	Kärpät	FIN.2	42	25	41	66	14	—	—	—	—	—
1977–78	Kärpät	SM-l	30	9	14	23	4	—	—	—	—	—
1978–79	Kärpät	SM-l	36	14	8	22	47	—	—	—	—	—
1979–80	Kärpät	SM-l	30	15	13	28	31	6	5	2	7	0
1980–81	Kärpät	SM-l	34	28	23	51	28	12	7	4	11	6
1981–82	New York Rangers	NHL	78	18	38	56	27	10	4	5	9	2
1982–83	New York Rangers	NHL	77	16	53	69	22	9	4	2	6	6
1983–84	New York Rangers	NHL	74	20	39	59	26	5	1	1	2	2
1984–85	New York Rangers	NHL	80	28	45	73	32	3	2	0	2	6
1985–86	New York Rangers	NHL	80	17	42	59	47	16	0	8	8	6
1986–87	SC Bern	NDA	35	26	27	53	27	—	—	—	—	—
1986–87	Edmonton Oilers	NHL	16	5	8	13	6	21	2	5	7	10
1987–88	HV71	SEL	40	10	22	32	26	2	0	1	1	2
1988–89	SC Bern	NDA	36	17	29	46	46	11	4	7	11	22
1989–90	New Jersey Devils	NHL	31	2	5	7	14	—	—	—	—	—
1989–90	Edmonton Oilers	NHL	10	1	7	8	6	22	2	11	13	12
1990–91	SC Bern	NDA	36	13	25	38	20	10	5	8	13	10
1991–92	SC Bern	NDA	35	7	16	23	24	11	4	6	10	4
1992–93	SC Bern	NDA	31	7	15	22	42	5	0	3	3	29
1993–94	Kärpät	FIN.2	4	1	5	6	6	—	—	—	—	—
1993–94	Tappara	SM-l	6	2	4	6	2	9	1	2	3	6
1994–95	SC Bern	NDA	19	3	7	10	20	6	1	5	6	4
1995–96	KalPa	SM-l	16	3	5	8	4	—	—	—	—	—
1995–96	Zürcher SC	NDA	18	4	11	15	4	—	—	—	—	—
1996–97	Kärpät	FIN.2	17	1	5	6	14	9	0	4	4	0
1997–98	Kärpät	FIN.2	44	8	23	31	42	14	2	6	8	10
SM-l totals			152	71	67	138	116	27	13	8	21	12
NHL totals			446	107	237	344	180	86	15	32	47	44
NDA totals			210	77	130	207	183	43	14	29	43	69

=== International ===
Year	Team	Event	GP	G	A	Pts	PIM
1976	Finland	EJC	3	1	0	1	0
1977	Finland	WJC	7	2	4	6	6
1977	Finland	EJC	2	0	2	2	0
1978	Finland	WJC	6	3	3	6	2
1978	Finland	WC	10	2	0	2	2
1979	Finland	WJC	6	0	3	3	0
1979	Finland	WC	6	2	0	2	2
1980	Finland	WJC	5	4	3	7	2
1981	Finland	WC	8	3	2	5	4
1981	Finland	CC	5	0	1	1	2
1985	Finland	WC	10	0	4	4	6
1987	Finland	CC	4	0	0	0	2
1988	Finland	OLY	8	4	2	6	0
1989	Finland	WC	10	2	4	6	6
Junior totals			29	10	15	25	10
Senior totals			61	13	13	26	24

== Awards and honours ==
- Directorate award (best defenceman) – 1980 World Junior Championships
- Kanada-malja champion – 1980–81
- Stanley Cup champion – 1986–87, 1989–90
- NDA champion – 1988–89, 1990–91, 1991–92
- In the 2009 book 100 Ranger Greats, was ranked no. 82 all-time of the 901 New York Rangers who had played during the team's first 82 seasons

Preceded by Pekka Rautakallio	Winner of the Pekka Rautakallio trophy 1979–80, 1980–81	Succeeded by Pertti Lehtonen
