= Markus Lehto =

Finnish ice hockey player

Personal information
- Nationality: Finnish
- Born: 20 October 1962 (age 62); Helsinki, Finland

Sport
- Sport: Ice hockey

Markus Lehto (born 20 October 1962) is a Finnish former ice hockey player, currently a player agent. He competed in the men's tournament at the 1984 Winter Olympics.

== Career statistics ==
=== Regular season and playoffs ===
			Regular season					Playoffs
Season	Team	League	GP	G	A	Pts	PIM	GP	G	A	Pts	PIM
1980–81	Oshawa Generals	OHL	57	6	9	15	86	—	—	—	—	—
1981–82	Jokerit	SM-l	35	2	4	6	60	—	—	—	—	—
1982–83	Jokerit	SM-l	31	4	7	11	72	8	3	2	5	16
1983–84	Jokerit	SM-l	37	3	18	21	58	—	—	—	—	—
1984–85	Jokerit	SM-l	35	2	5	7	38	—	—	—	—	—
1985–86	Västra Frölunda HC	SWE.2	31	6	11	17	45	—	—	—	—	—
1986–87	Västra Frölunda HC	SWE.2	31	5	7	12	42	2	0	0	0	6
1987–88	TPS	SM-l	42	10	12	22	16	—	—	—	—	—
1988–89	HPK	SM-l	44	6	10	16	39	—	—	—	—	—
1989–90	HPK	SM-l	44	3	22	25	38	—	—	—	—	—
1990–91	HPK	SM-l	44	0	11	11	32	8	0	2	2	6
SM-l totals			312	30	89	119	353	16	3	4	7	22

=== International ===
Year	Team	Event	GP	G	A	Pts	PIM
1980	Finland	EJC	5	0	1	1	8
1982	Finland	WJC	7	1	9	10	14
1984	Finland	OG	6	1	1	2	2
1985	Finland	WC	10	1	1	2	10
Junior totals			12	1	10	11	22
Senior totals			16	2	2	4	12

"Markus Lehto". Elite Prospects.
