= Jari Kaarela =

Finnish ice hockey player

- Born: 8 August 1958 (age 66); Tampere, Finland
- Height: 5 ft 10 in (178 cm)
- Weight: 165 lb (75 kg; 11 st 11 lb)
- Position: Goaltender
- Caught: Left
- Played for: Colorado Rockies; Oulun Kärpät; HIFK
- NHL draft: Undrafted
- Playing career: 1978–1986

Jari Kaarela (born 8 August 1958 in Tampere, Finland) is a Finnish retired professional ice hockey goaltender who played in the National Hockey League and SM-liiga. He played five games with the Colorado Rockies during the 1980–81 season and then two seasons with for HIFK of the SM-liiga between 1984 and 1986.

== Career statistics ==
=== Regular season and playoffs ===
			Regular season									Playoffs
Season	Team	League	GP	W	L	T	MIN	GA	SO	GAA	SV%	GP	W	L	MIN	GA	SO	GAA	SV%
1971–72	Ilves U16	FIN-U16	—	—	—	—	—	—	—	—	—	—	—	—	—	—	—	—	—
1972–73	Ilves U20	FIN-U20	—	—	—	—	—	—	—	—	—	—	—	—	—	—	—	—	—
1973–74	Ilves U16	FIN-U16	—	—	—	—	—	—	—	—	—	—	—	—	—	—	—	—	—
1976–77	Ilves U20	FIN-U20	—	—	—	—	—	—	—	—	—	—	—	—	—	—	—	—	—
1977–78	Ilves U20	FIN-U20	—	—	—	—	—	—	—	—	—	—	—	—	—	—	—	—	—
1978–79	SaPKo Savonlinna	FIN-2	—	—	—	—	—	—	—	—	—	—	—	—	—	—	—	—	—
1979–80	SaPKo Savonlinna	FIN-2	—	—	—	—	—	—	—	—	—	—	—	—	—	—	—	—	—
1980–81	Indianapolis Checkers	CHL	2	2	0	0	120	4	1	2.00	.902	—	—	—	—	—	—	—	—
1980–81	Fort Worth Texans	CHL	36	13	20	2	2093	133	1	3.81	.854	—	—	—	—	—	—	—	—
1980–81	Colorado Rockies	NHL	5	2	2	0	220	22	0	6.00	.809	—	—	—	—	—	—	—	—
1981–82	Muskegon Mohawks	IHL	49	—	—	—	2682	219	1	4.90	—	—	—	—	—	—	—	—	—
1981–82	Fort Worth Texans	CHL	2	0	2	0	120	13	0	6.50	.822	—	—	—	—	—	—	—	—
1982–83	Kiekko-Reipas Lahti	FIN	3	—	—	—	—	13	—	—	.860	—	—	—	—	—	—	—	—
1983–84	Kärpät Oulu	FIN	6	—	—	—	—	24	0	3.00	.863	1	—	—	—	1	—	—	—
1984–85	HIFK	FIN	15	—	—	—	—	55	1	3.67	.864	—	—	—	—	—	—	—	—
1985–86	HIFK	FIN	14	—	—	—	—	43	—	4.18	.883	2	—	—	—	7	—	—	—
1992–93	Karhu-Kissat	FIN-2	—	—	—	—	—	—	—	—	—	—	—	—	—	—	—	—	—
NHL totals			5	2	2	0	220	115	0	6.00	.809	—	—	—	—	—	—	—	—
