= Jyrki Seppä =

Finnish ice hockey player

- Born: November 14, 1961 (age 64) Tampere, FIN
- Height: 6 ft 1 in (185 cm)
- Weight: 189 lb (86 kg; 13 st 7 lb)
- Position: Defence
- Shot: Left
- Played for: Winnipeg Jets; Ilves; Jokerit
- NHL draft: 43rd overall, 1981; Winnipeg Jets
- Playing career: 1979–1984; 1985–1986

Jyrki Seppä (born 14 November 1961 in Tampere, Finland) is a retired professional ice hockey player in the National Hockey League.

== Playing career ==
=== Pre-NHL career ===
Jyrki Seppä started his active career in 1979 when he played for Tampere Ilves in SM-liiga.

Seppä played two seasons for Ilves before he moved to Jokerit of Helsinki. Seppä played the 1981–82 season for Jokerit before he was contracted by Winnipeg Jets

=== NHL career ===
Jyrki Seppä was drafted by the Winnipeg Jets in the 1981 NHL entry draft in the third round, 43rd overall. He played one season in the NHL for Winnipeg in 1983–84 and two seasons in the American Hockey League for the Sherbrooke Jets. During that NHL season, he played in 13 games picking up two assists and six penalty minutes.

=== After NHL ===
After his short NHL visit, Seppä retired from active playing when he was 24 years of age. Seppä however returned and played again for Jokerit in SM-liiga. Seppä retired soon after his return season to Jokerit in 1986. The reason behind his early retirement was injuries and the lack of desire to play.

== Career statistics ==
=== Regular season and playoffs ===
			Regular season					Playoffs
Season	Team	League	GP	G	A	Pts	PIM	GP	G	A	Pts	PIM
1979–80	Ilves U20	FIN-Jr	1	0	0	0	4	—	—	—	—	—
1979–80	Ilves	FIN	30	1	1	2	26	—	—	—	—	—
1980–81	Ilves	FIN	34	3	4	7	14	2	0	0	0	5
1981–82	Jokerit	FIN	31	6	1	7	12	—	—	—	—	—
1982–83	Sherbrooke Jets	AHL	72	2	13	15	66	—	—	—	—	—
1983–84	Sherbrooke Jets	AHL	60	5	35	40	43	—	—	—	—	—
1983–84	Winnipeg Jets	NHL	13	0	2	2	6	—	—	—	—	—
1985–86	Jokerit	FIN	32	2	7	9	36	—	—	—	—	—
FIN totals			127	12	13	25	88	2	0	0	0	5
NHL totals			13	0	2	2	6	—	—	—	—	—

=== International ===
Year	Team	Event	GP	G	A	Pts	PIM
1981	Finland	WJC	5	2	0	2	4
Junior totals			5	2	0	2	4
