= Veli-Pekka Ketola =

Finnish ice hockey player and coach

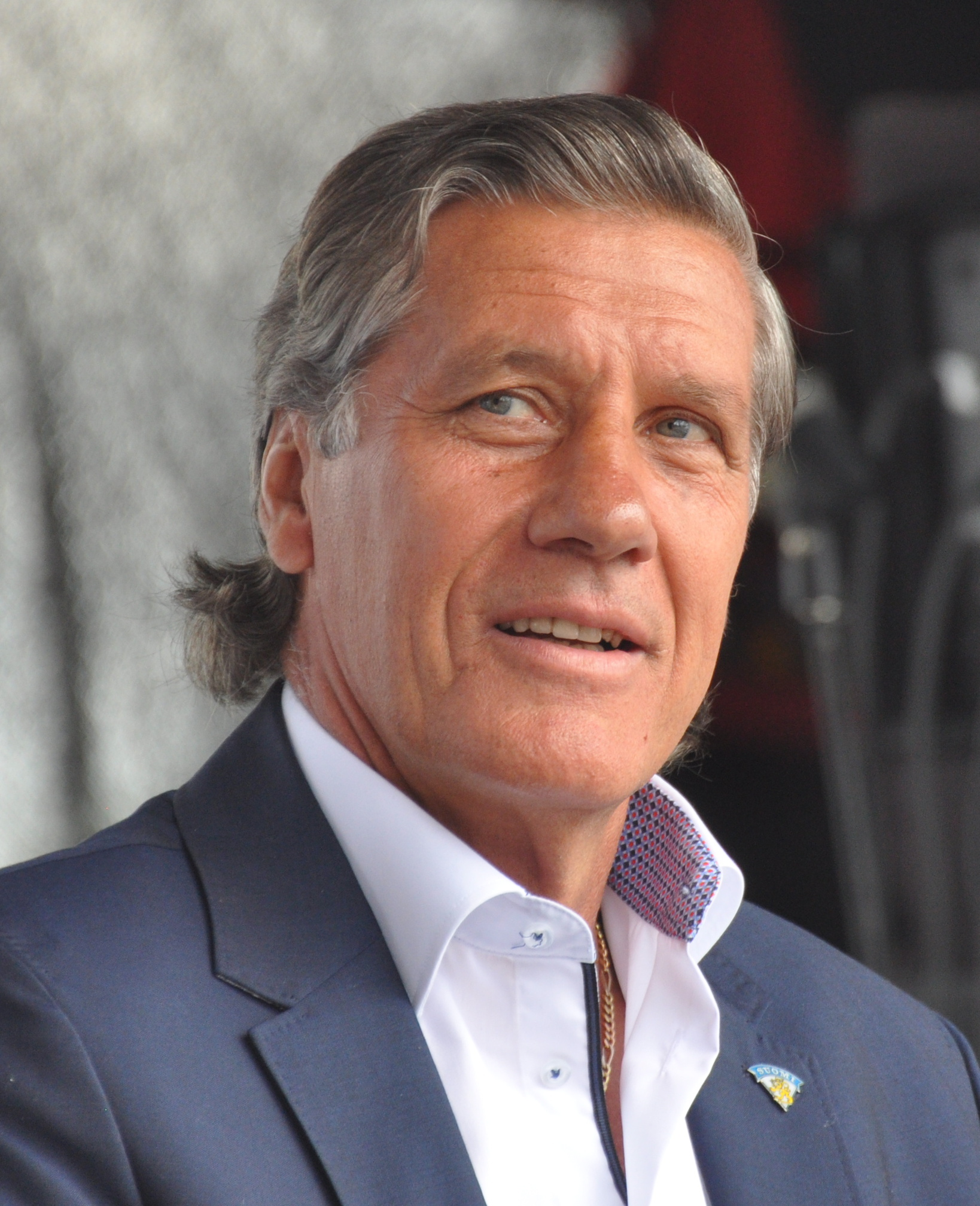
- Born: 28 March 1948 (age 78) Pori, Finland
- Height: 6 ft 1 in (185 cm)
- Weight: 238 lb (108 kg; 17 st 0 lb)
- Position: Centre
- Shot: Left
- Played for: Karhut; Ässät; Winnipeg Jets; Calgary Cowboys; Colorado Rockies
- Coached for: Ässät; Black Wings Linz
- National team: Finland
- Playing career: 1963–1983
- Coaching career: 1993–2004

Veli-Pekka Ketola (born 28 March 1948) is a Finnish former professional ice hockey player and coach. He played 15 seasons in the top flight of ice hockey in Finland, 10 of which were with the Porin Ässät. Ketola retired from professional ice hockey in 1982 after his National Hockey League (NHL) debut season with the Colorado Rockies. Ketola also represented the World Hockey Association (WHA) teams Winnipeg Jets and the Calgary Cowboys.

Ketola's jersey number, 13, has been retired by the Porin Ässät and he is 4th in all-time point scoring for the club with 493 points. He was selected to the SM-sarja and SM-liiga all-star team six times in his career. The Liiga top-scorer award is named after Ketola. He won the Kanada-malja championship thrice in his career, twice with Ässät and once with Porin Karhut. Ketola is a one-time Avco Cup champion with the Winnipeg Jets. Internationally Ketola represented Finland. He played in the World Championship six times and the Olympics twice.

Ketola worked as Ässät's head coach from 1993 to 1996 and briefly in 1999. He is also the former general manager of the club. He worked for one season as the head coach of Black Wings Linz of the EBEL.

Veli-Pekka Ketola was inducted into the Finnish Hockey Hall of Fame in 1990.

== Playing career ==
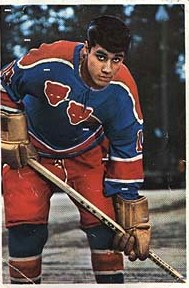
Veli-Pekka Ketola in a Porin karhut jersey in 1965

Ketola played his first SM-sarja match for Karhut in 1964 at the age of 15 against Ilves. The following year, 1965, Ketola won his first Kanada-malja championship for the club. In the 1965–66 season, he made his breakthrough as the team's leading player. In the following season, he played his first season for the Porin Ässät, which is successor team of Karhut. Ässät finished fourth in the league. Ketola scored 25 points in his first season with Ässät.

At the end of the 1960s, the German agent Mike Daski asked Ketola about his interest in joining the Detroit Red Wings in the National Hockey League. Ketola agreed to go to the training camp, even though he had just signed a contract with the Jokerit Helsinki. Ketola didn't make the cut to the Red Wings lineup. However, Ketola was offered a contract with the farm team Grand Rapids Griffins, but due to the low salary, Ketola was not interested. He decided to return to Finland with Jokerit, with whom he still had a contract. With the Jokerit, Ketola set the club's one-game points record with eight points against Hilpara in January 1970.

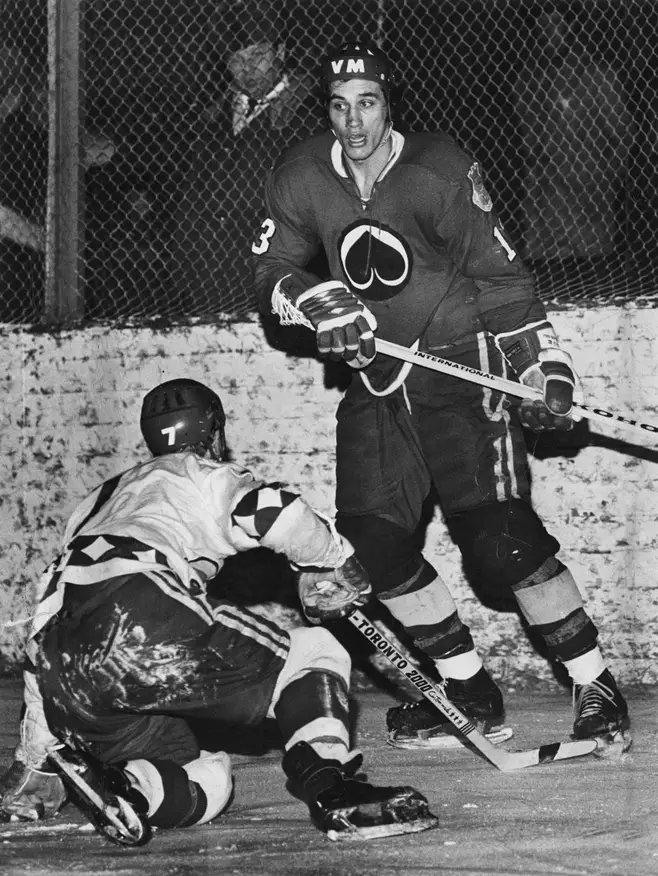
Veli-Pekka Ketola with the Porin Ässät in 1971

For the following season, 1970–71, Ketola moved back to Ässät, who won the Kanada-malja championship for the first time. Ketola got a lot of playing time and was one of the team's leading players with 31 points, which won him the top scorer award.

In the fall of 1974, together with Heikki Riihiranta, Ketola made history by becoming the first player who played junior ice hockey in Finland to become a professional in North America, for the Winnipeg Jets of the World Hockey Association. Being big and not afraid of a physical game, he most often played as the team's second center, but sometimes also as the first center, with Bobby Hull and Ulf Nilsson playing as wingers. In 1976, the Jets won the WHA championship, the Avco Cup. In the middle of the next season, Ketola was sold to the Calgary Cowboys. However, the club soon went bankrupt, so Ketola returned to Finland and Ässät.

In 1978, as captain of the team, Ketola won his third Kanada-malja championship, when Ässät beat Tappara in the finals. In the decisive final match, Ketola scored six points, as Ässät beat tappara 6–2. His 20 points in ten playoff games was a long-time SM-liiga record.

In 1980, Ässät lost to Helsingfors IFK in the finals. The decisive game ended with a 6–5 victory for HIFK, even though Ässät had equalised a 1–5 loss position. After the match, Ketola threw his silver medal into the stands of the Helsinki Ice Hall. Ketola played his last SM-liiga matches in 1981.

Having already retired from ice hockey, Ketola reverted the decision to retire to play in North America in the NHL with the Colorado Rockies for the 1981–82 season. However, he got little playing time. In 44 matches, he scored 9 goals and 5 assists. Ketola played the last six matches of his playing career in I-divisioona, Finland's second division, with KalPa in the 1982–83 season. The team was coached by his friend Matti Keinonen.

== International play ==
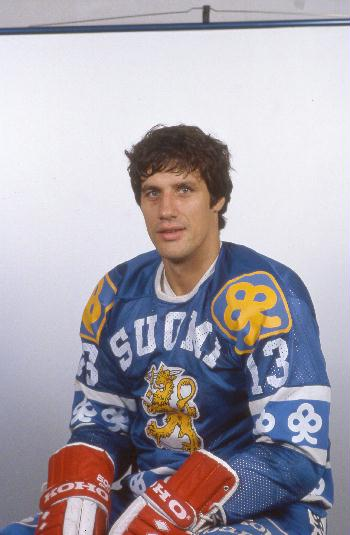
Ketola with the Finnish national team in 1970

In his national team career, which started in 1967, Veli-Pekka Ketola played in six world championships and two Winter Olympics. Ketola played with Team Finland in the Canada Cup two times.

== Coaching and managerial career ==
After retiring as a player, Ketola coached the Porin Ässät starting from 1993. In Ketola's first season as head coach of the Porin Ässät, they reached the quarterfinals where they lost to Tappara. The second season went better for the team as they beat Satakunta rivals Rauman Lukko in the bronze medal game 3–0. The following season Ässät lost 3–0 to HC TPS in the quarterfinal and Ketola's job as head coach changed to general manager for two seasons. Ketola returned to coaching Ässät in 1999 as they fired their head coach, Esko Nokelainen.

Ketola coached the Black Wings Linz of the EBEL for the 2003–04 season, but he was replaced in the middle of the season.

== Honours and accolades ==
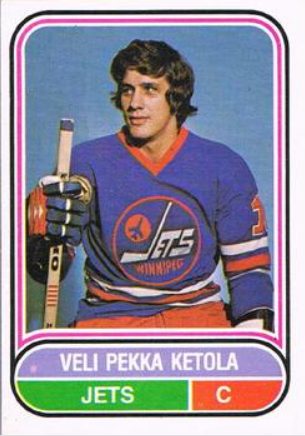
Ketola in 1975-76 card for Winnipeg Jets of the WHA

- General manager of the U20 Finnish team in 2016.
- Six-time all-star in Finland.
- Elected to the Finnish Ice Hockey Hall of Fame in 1990 as a player.
- Won the Finnish Champion (Kanada-malja) in 1964–65, 1970–71 and 1977–78.
- Won the Avco World Trophy in 1975–76.
- Won the Best Hockey Player of Finland Trophy in 1974 and 1978.
- Won the Matti Keinonen trophy in 1978–79.
- His number 13 was retired by Porin Ässät.
- He won the Veli-Pekka Ketola trophy the year it was introduced (1978).
- Led the Finnish League in scoring in 1971.
- Ketola played as the Captain on Finland national team for the first two Canada Cup tournaments in 1976 and 1981.

== Career statistics ==
=== Regular season and playoffs ===
| | | | Regular season | | | | | Playoffs |
| Season | Team | League | GP | G | A | Pts | PIM | GP | G | A | Pts | PIM |
|---|---|---|---|---|---|---|---|---|---|---|---|---|
| 1963–64 | Karhut | SM-s | 2 | 0 | 0 | 0 | 0 | — | — | — | — | — |
| 1964–65 | Karhut | SM-s | 18 | 4 | 1 | 5 | 2 | — | — | — | — | — |
| 1965–66 | Karhut | SM-s | 19 | 8 | 3 | 11 | 12 | — | — | — | — | — |
| 1966–67 | Karhut | SM-s | 22 | 15 | 10 | 25 | 30 | — | — | — | — | — |
| 1967–68 | Ässät | SM-s | 20 | 12 | 13 | 25 | 16 | — | — | — | — | — |
| 1968–69 | Ässät | SM-s | 20 | 15 | 9 | 24 | 22 | — | — | — | — | — |
| 1969–70 | Jokerit | SM-s | 22 | 25 | 12 | 37 | 26 | — | — | — | — | — |
| 1970–71 | Ässät | SM-s | 31 | 25 | 17 | 42 | 31 | — | — | — | — | — |
| 1971–72 | Ässät | SM-s | 32 | 16 | 14 | 30 | 25 | — | — | — | — | — |
| 1972–73 | Ässät | SM-s | 36 | 25 | 16 | 41 | 74 | — | — | — | — | — |
| 1973–74 | Ässät | SM-s | 35 | 23 | 21 | 44 | 44 | — | — | — | — | — |
| 1974–75 | Winnipeg Jets | WHA | 74 | 23 | 28 | 51 | 25 | — | — | — | — | — |
| 1975–76 | Winnipeg Jets | WHA | 80 | 32 | 36 | 68 | 32 | 13 | 7 | 5 | 12 | 2 |
| 1976–77 | Winnipeg Jets | WHA | 64 | 25 | 29 | 54 | 59 | — | — | — | — | — |
| 1976–77 | Calgary Cowboys | WHA | 17 | 4 | 6 | 10 | 2 | — | — | — | — | — |
| 1977–78 | Ässät | SM-l | 36 | 27 | 29 | 56 | 59 | 9 | 10 | 10 | 20 | 22 |
| 1978–79 | Ässät | SM-l | 36 | 23 | 49 | 72 | 66 | 8 | 1 | 6 | 7 | 30 |
| 1979–80 | Ässät | SM-l | 36 | 22 | 38 | 60 | 61 | 7 | 3 | 7 | 10 | 40 |
| 1980–81 | Ässät | SM-l | 36 | 23 | 39 | 62 | 61 | 2 | 0 | 0 | 0 | 2 |
| 1981–82 | Colorado Rockies | NHL | 44 | 9 | 5 | 14 | 4 | — | — | — | — | — |
| 1982–83 | KalPa | FIN II | 6 | 4 | 8 | 12 | 6 | — | — | — | — | — |
| SM-s totals | | | 257 | 168 | 116 | 284 | 282 | — | — | — | — | — |
| SM-l totals | | | 144 | 95 | 155 | 250 | 247 | 26 | 14 | 23 | 37 | 94 |
| WHA totals | | | 235 | 84 | 99 | 183 | 118 | 13 | 7 | 5 | 12 | 2 |

=== International ===
| Year | Team | Event | GP | G | A | Pts | PIM |
|---|---|---|---|---|---|---|---|
| 1968 | Finland | OLY | 8 | 3 | 3 | 6 | 10 |
| 1969 | Finland | WC | 8 | 0 | 2 | 2 | 2 |
| 1970 | Finland | WC | 10 | 3 | 4 | 7 | 32 |
| 1971 | Finland | WC | 6 | 5 | 1 | 6 | 4 |
| 1972 | Finland | OLY | 6 | 1 | 3 | 4 | 7 |
| 1972 | Finland | WC | 9 | 4 | 3 | 7 | 4 |
| 1973 | Finland | WC | 10 | 2 | 2 | 4 | 12 |
| 1974 | Finland | WC | 10 | 7 | 3 | 10 | 4 |
| 1976 | Finland | CC | 5 | 0 | 0 | 0 | 2 |
| 1981 | Finland | CC | 5 | 0 | 0 | 0 | 6 |
| Senior totals | | | 77 | 25 | 21 | 46 | 83 |
