= Joni Lehto =

Finnish ice hockey player

- Born: July 15, 1970 (age 56) Turku, Finland
- Height: 6 ft 0 in (183 cm)
- Weight: 211 lb (96 kg; 15 st 1 lb)
- Position: Defence
- Shot: Left
- Played for: SM-liiga; TPS; Lukko; Ilves; Ässät; AHL; Capital District Islanders; IHL; Salt Lake City Golden Eagles; ECHL; Richmond Renegades; Elitserien; Luleå HF; DEL; Frankfurt Lions
- NHL draft: 111th overall, 1990; New York Islanders
- Playing career: 1991–1998

Joni Lehto (born July 15, 1970) is a Finnish former professional ice hockey defenceman.

Lehto played for Ottawa 67's in the Ontario Hockey League before being drafted to NHL by New York Islanders. Lehto was part of the Islanders organization for three seasons but never played for the NHL team, playing mostly for their minor league affiliate, the Capital District Islanders in the American Hockey League.

After NHL, Lehto played for Lukko, Ilves, Ässät in Finland, Luleå HF in Sweden and Frankfurt Lions in Germany.

Lehto retired from playing in 1998.

Preceded by Juha Lind	Winner of the Jarmo Wasama memorial trophy 1994-95	Succeeded by Jani Hurme
