= Pekka Arbelius =

Finnish ice hockey player

- Born: 26 June 1960 (age 64); Oulu, Finland
- Height: 5 ft 9 in (175 cm)
- Weight: 169 lb (77 kg; 12 st 1 lb)
- Position: Forward
- Played for: Kärpät; MODO Hockey; JYP
- Playing career: 1979–1994

Pekka Arbelius (born 26 June 1960 in Oulu) is a Finnish retired ice hockey player.

Arbelius played for Kärpät, MODO Hockey and JYP. He represented Finland in five World Championships (1981, 1982, 1985, 1986 and 1990), and he also took the 1979-1980 Jarmo Wasama memorial trophy.
