= Rauli Levonen =

Finnish ice hockey player

Rauli Levonen (15 July 1953 – 1 December 1981) was a Finnish ice hockey player. He represented the Porin Ässät in 1972–1981 during the main series. He won the Finnish Championship in 1978 in Ässät, the SM-liiga silver in 1979 and 1980 and the SM-liiga bronze in 1976. He died at the age of 28 from a heart attack. He felt chest pains during a match against HC Ganal Rauma and was rushed to the hospital where he died.
