= 1975–76 SM-liiga season =

- SM-liiga's first logo
- Relegated to I-Divisioona: Vaasan Sport
- Finals champions: HC TPS
- Runners-up: Tampereen Tappara

SM-liiga seasons
- ← 1974–75 (SM-sarja) 1976–77 →

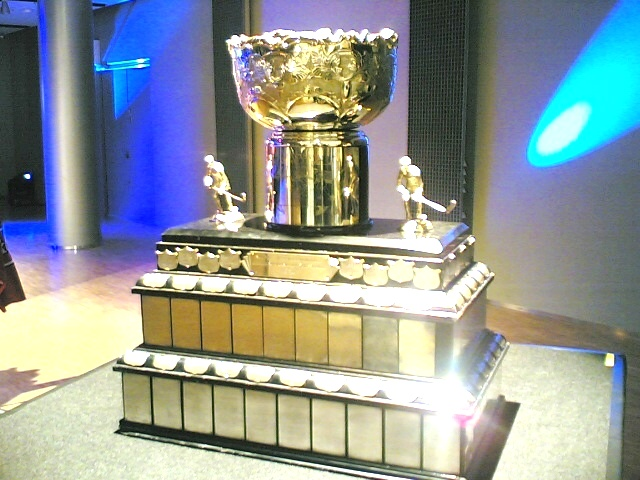
Kanada-malja

The 1975–76 SM-liiga season was the inaugural season for the new top level series of ice hockey in Finland, SM-liiga., which replaced the SM-sarja (1928–1975) The season featured 10 teams who played 36 game regular season followed by playoffs for top 4 teams. Points were given as follows: 2 from win, 1 point from tie and 0 points from loss

== Regular season ==
=== Regular season standings ===
Note: GP = Games played, W = Wins, T = Ties, L = Losses, Pts = Points, GF = Goals for, GA = Goals against

SM-liiga	GP	W	T	L	Pts	GF	GA
TPS	36	25	5	6	55	194	113
Tappara	36	21	6	9	48	189	113
Ässät	36	20	3	13	43	187	140
HIFK	36	19	5	12	43	181	146
Lukko	36	19	3	14	41	175	142
Jokerit	36	17	2	17	36	169	156
Ilves	36	14	6	16	34	147	160
KooVee	36	14	5	17	33	152	162
FoPS	36	6	4	26	16	126	243
Sport	36	5	1	30	11	114	259

Teams written in bold letters advance to playoffs.

=== Regular season scoring leaders ===
Note: GP = Games played, G = Goals, A = Assists, Pts = Points, PIM = Penalties in minutes

Player	Team	GP	G	A	PTS	PIM
Martti Jarkko	Tappara	35	26	38	64	64
Jouni Rinne	Lukko	36	36	22	58	16
Matti Hagman	HIFK	36	24	34	58	39
Seppo Repo	TPS	35	33	22	55	32
Hannu Kapanen	Jokerit	36	29	24	53	30

== Playoffs ==
=== Semi finals ===
Home	Score	Away	Score
TPS	2	HIFK	1
HIFK	2	TPS	5

- TPS Win Best of 3 Series 2-0.

Home	Score	Away	Score
Tappara	3OT	Ässät	2
Ässät	4	Tappara	6

- Tappara win best of 3 Series 2-0.

=== Bronze medal games ===
Home	Score	Away	Score
Ässät	8	HIFK	5
HIFK	6	Ässät	8

Ässät win best of 3 Series 2-0 and the Bronze Medals for the 1975–76 SM-liiga season.

=== Finals ===
The finals took place on 18–19 March.

Home	Score	Away	Score
TPS	4	Tappara	1
Tappara	1	TPS	2

TPS win the Best of 3 Series 2-0 and the 1975–76 SM-liiga championship.

=== Playoffs scoring leaders ===
Note: GP = Games played, G = Goals, A = Assists, Pts = Points, PIM = Penalties in minutes

Player	Team	GP	G	A	PTS	PIM
Timo Parkkonen	HIFK	4	4	2	6	4
Rauli Levonen	Ässät	4	4	2	6	14
Erkki Väkiparta	Ässät	4	3	2	5	0
Seppo Repo	TPS	4	2	3	5	2
Tapio Koskinen	Ässät	4	4	0	4	2

== Relegation ==
Note: GP = Games played, W = Wins, T = Ties, L = Losses, Pts = Points, GF = Goals for, GA = Goals against

	GP	W	T	L	Pts	GF	GA
FoPS	6	3	1	2	7	32	29
Kiekkoreipas	6	3	0	3	6	35	30
Kärpät	6	2	2	2	6	23	32
Sport	6	2	1	3	5	26	25

=== Replay ===
Kärpät - Kiekkoreipas 3-4 OT

Preceded by 1974–75 SM-sarja season (last)	First SM-liiga season 1975–76	Succeeded by 1976–77 SM-liiga season
