= 1972–73 SM-sarja season =

Finnish ice hockey season

The 1972–73 SM-sarja season was the 42nd season of the SM-sarja, the top level of ice hockey in Finland. 10 teams participated in the league, and Jokerit Helsinki won the championship.

== Regular season ==
	Club	GP	W	T	L	GF–GA	Pts
1.	Jokerit Helsinki	36	29	3	4	193:86	61
2.	HIFK Helsinki	36	23	8	5	170:111	54
3.	Tappara Tampere	36	24	3	9	206:94	51
4.	Ilves Tampere	36	18	3	15	150:129	39
5.	HJK Helsinki	36	15	8	13	142:134	38
6.	Koo-Vee Tampere	36	13	5	18	120:135	31
7.	Ässät Pori	36	10	10	16	136:160	30
8.	TuTo Turku	36	12	6	18	112:150	30
9.	TPS Turku	36	9	5	22	126:182	23
10.	SaiPa Lappeenranta	36	1	1	34	100:274	3

Source: Elite Prospects

Preceded by 1971–72 SM-sarja season	SM-sarja season 1972–73	Succeeded by 1973–74 SM-sarja season
