= 1986–87 SM-liiga season =

Finnish ice hockey season

The 1986–87 SM-liiga season was the 12th season of the SM-liiga, the top level of ice hockey in Finland. 10 teams participated in the league, and Tappara Tampere won the championship.

== Standings ==
	Club	GP	W	T	L	GF	GA	Pts
1.	Kärpät Oulu	44	25	4	15	209	161	54
2.	Tappara Tampere	44	24	4	16	203	148	52
3.	TPS Turku	44	22	6	16	198	194	50
4.	HIFK Helsinki	44	21	5	18	193	168	47
5.	Ilves Tampere	44	21	5	18	195	169	47
6.	Ässät Pori	44	19	5	20	167	191	43
7	JyP HT Jyväskylä	44	17	7	20	165	179	41
8.	Lukko Rauma	44	16	8	20	158	179	40
9.	KalPa Kuopio	44	17	5	22	174	208	39
10.	Jokerit Helsinki	44	12	3	29	161	226	27

Source: Elite Prospects

== Playoffs ==
=== Semifinal ===
- Kärpät - HIFK 3:1 (3:2, 1:6, 8:4, 4:2)
- Tappara - TPS 3:1 (5:6, 2:1, 6:0, 5:3)

=== 3rd place ===
- TPS - HIFK 1:5

=== Final ===
- Kärpät - Tappara 1:4 (3:5, 4:6, 5:1, 3:6, 2:5)

== Relegation ==
	Club	GP	W	T	L	GF	GA	Pts
1.	KalPa Kuopio	6	4	2	0	30	18	10
2.	HPK Hämeenlinna	6	3	2	1	37	20	8
3.	TuTo Turku	6	1	3	2	23	23	5
4.	JoKP Joensuu	6	0	1	5	12	41	1
