= 1981–82 SM-liiga season =

Sports season

The 1981–82 SM-liiga season was the seventh season of the SM-liiga, the top level of ice hockey in Finland. 10 teams participated in the league, and Tappara Tampere won the championship.

== Standings ==
	Club	GP	W	T	L	GF	GA	Pts
1.	TPS Turku	36	23	6	7	180	120	52
2.	HIFK Helsinki	36	22	6	8	170	116	50
3.	Tappara Tampere	36	22	5	9	187	121	49
4.	Ässät Pori	36	15	8	13	176	165	38
5.	Kärpät Oulu	36	16	6	14	177	185	38
6.	Kiekko-Reipas Lahti	36	14	7	15	164	157	35
7	SaiPa Lappeenranta	36	15	5	16	146	150	35
8.	Ilves Tampere	36	11	5	20	131	162	27
9.	Jokerit Helsinki	36	9	2	25	121	178	20
10.	Lukko Rauma	36	6	4	26	134	232	16

Source: Elite Prospects

== Playoffs ==
=== Quarterfinal ===
- Tappara - Kiekko-Reipas 2:0 (7:3, 6:5 P)
- Ässät - Kärpät 2:1 (5:4 P, 4:6, 6:4)

=== Semifinal ===
- TPS - Ässät 3:0 (5:4 P, 5:3, 7:6 P)
- HIFK - Tappara 2:3 (4:3, 9:2, 3:4, 1:2, 1:2)

=== 3rd place ===
- HIFK - Ässät 2:1 (7:3, 3:6, 4:2)

=== Final ===
- TPS - Tappara 1:3 (2:4, 0:4, 5:4, 2:3)

=== Relegation ===
- Jokerit Helsinki - JyP HT Jyväskylä 3:0 (4:1, 5:0, 11:2)
- FoPS Forssa - Lukko Rauma 0:3 (6:11, 3:8, 1:9)
