= 1973–74 SM-sarja season =

- Season champions: HIFK Helsinki
- Runners-up: Tappara Tampere
- Relegated to Suomen sarja: Karhu-Kissat Helsinki

SM-sarja seasons
- ← 1972–73 1974–75 →

The 1973–74 SM-sarja season was the 43rd season of the SM-sarja, the top level of ice hockey in Finland. 10 teams participated in the league, and HIFK Helsinki won the championship.

== Regular season ==
	Club	GP	W	T	L	GF–GA	Pts
1.	HIFK Helsinki	36	25	3	8	204:104	53
2.	Tappara Tampere	36	23	3	10	186:99	49
3.	Ilves Tampere	36	23	1	12	182:135	47
4.	Jokerit Helsinki	36	20	5	11	192:116	45
5.	Koo-Vee Helsinki	36	20	4	12	178:139	44
6.	Ässät Pori	36	17	6	13	154:145	40
7.	TuTo Turku	36	11	5	20	132:195	27
8.	TPS Turku	36	10	6	20	133:179	26
9.	Lukko Rauma	36	8	4	24	131:240	20
10.	Karhu-Kissat Helsinki (Note: Helsingin Jääkiekkoklubi changed their name to Karhu-Kissat right before their last game as a result of a merger between HJK and Karhu-Kissat.)	36	4	1	31	96:236	9

Source: Elite Prospects

Preceded by 1972–73 SM-sarja season	SM-sarja season 1973–74	Succeeded by 1974–75 SM-sarja season (last)
