= 1974–75 SM-sarja season =

- Season champions: Tappara
- Runners-up: HIFK
- Relegated to I-Divisioona: SaiPa and TuTo

SM-sarja seasons
- ← 1973–74 1975–76 (SM-liiga) →

The 1974–75 SM-sarja season was the 44th and last season of the SM-sarja, the top level of ice hockey in Finland. The SM-liiga became the new top level league in 1975-76. 10 teams participated in the league, and Tappara Tampere won the championship.

== Regular season ==
	Club	GP	W	T	L	GF–GA	Pts
1.	Tappara Tampere	36	26	7	3	200:98	59
2.	HIFK Helsinki	36	22	4	10	189:140	48
3.	Ilves Tampere	36	18	5	13	172:132	41
4.	Jokerit Helsinki	36	18	4	14	174:128	40
5.	TPS Turku	36	15	4	17	153:156	34
6.	Lukko Rauma	36	14	6	16	138:163	34
7.	Koo-Vee Tampere	36	14	3	19	140:137	31
8.	Ässät Pori	36	11	7	18	132:151	29
9.	SaiPa Lappeenranta	36	9	5	22	103:204	23
10.	TuTo Turku	36	8	5	23	114:206	21

Source: Elite Prospects

Preceded by 1973–74 SM-sarja season	Last SM-sarja season 1974–75	Succeeded by 1975–76 SM-liiga season (first)
