= 1983–84 SM-liiga season =

Finnish ice hockey season

The 1983–84 SM-liiga season was the ninth season of the SM-liiga, the top level of ice hockey in Finland. 10 teams participated in the league, and Tappara Tampere won the championship.

== Standings ==
| | Club | GP | W | T | L | GF | GA | Pts |
|---|---|---|---|---|---|---|---|---|
| 1. | Tappara Tampere | 37 | 24 | 3 | 10 | 175 | 117 | 51 |
| 2. | Ässät Pori | 37 | 23 | 3 | 11 | 171 | 135 | 49 |
| 3. | Kärpät Oulu | 37 | 21 | 6 | 10 | 175 | 134 | 48 |
| 4. | HIFK Helsinki | 37 | 21 | 5 | 11 | 209 | 151 | 47 |
| 5. | TPS Turku | 37 | 23 | 1 | 13 | 150 | 117 | 47 |
| 6. | Ilves Tampere | 37 | 16 | 8 | 13 | 152 | 147 | 40 |
| 7 | Jokerit Helsinki | 37 | 17 | 3 | 17 | 191 | 162 | 37 |
| 8. | SaiPa Lappeenranta | 37 | 11 | 4 | 22 | 121 | 184 | 26 |
| 9. | Kiekko-Reipas Lahti | 37 | 6 | 7 | 24 | 113 | 191 | 6 |
| 10. | HPK Hämeenlinna | 37 | 3 | 0 | 34 | 112 | 234 | 6 |

Source: Elite Prospects

== Playoffs ==
=== Quarterfinals ===
- Kärpät - Ilves 2:0 (5:1, 4:3)
- HIFK - TPS 0:2 (3:6, 5:6)

=== Semifinal ===
- Tappara - TPS 3:2 (2:3, 3:6, 2:1, 5:3, 3:1)
- Ässät - Kärpät 3:2 (3:1, 3:5, 3:2, 2:9, 5:4)

=== 3rd place ===
- Kärpät - TPS 2:1 (2:4, 6:4, 7:2)

=== Final ===
- Tappara - Ässät 3:1 (4:5, 6:3, 3:2, 4:3)

== Relegation ==
- Lukko Rauma - HPK Hämeenlinna 3:2 (8:2, 4:6, 7:2, 4:5 OT, 3:1)
- Kiekko-Reipas Lahti - JyP HT Jyväskylä 3:1 (4:7, 5:4 OT, 4:3, 5:3)
