= 1985–86 SM-liiga season =

Finnish ice hockey season

The 1985–86 SM-liiga season was the 11th season of the SM-liiga, the top level of ice hockey in Finland. 10 teams participated in the league, and Tappara Tampere won the championship.

== Standings ==
	Club	GP	W	T	L	GF	GA	Pts
1.	Tappara Tampere	36	21	6	9	179	125	48
2.	HIFK Helsinki	36	23	1	12	178	134	47
3.	TPS Turku	36	18	5	13	153	139	41
4.	Kärpät Oulu	36	21	6	9	138	139	41
5.	JyP HT Jyväskylä	36	19	1	16	143	135	39
6.	Ilves Tampere	36	17	4	15	159	143	38
7	Ässät Pori	36	17	3	16	186	168	37
8.	Lukko Rauma	36	15	1	20	160	192	31
9.	Jokerit Helsinki	36	10	2	24	131	181	22
10.	SaiPa Lappeenranta	36	7	2	27	98	169	16

Source: Elite Prospects

== Playoffs ==
=== Semifinals ===
- Tappara - Kärpät 3:0 (8:0, 5:2, 4:3)
- HIFK - TPS 3:2 (5:4, 1:3, 2:5, 3:2, 3:2)

=== 3rd place ===
- Kärpät - TPS 2:0 (4:3, 7:3)

=== Final ===
- Tappara - HIFK 4:1 (7:6, 0:1, 3:2, 6:2, 3:1)

== Relegation ==
	Club	GP	W	T	L	GF	GA	Pts
1.	TuTo Turku	6	4	0	2	26	15	8
2.	Jokerit Helsinki	6	4	0	2	34	30	8
3.	KooKoo Kouvola	6	2	0	4	20	25	4
4.	HPK	6	2	0	4	24	34	4
