= 1976–77 SM-liiga season =

Finnish ice hockey season

The 1976–77 SM-liiga season was the second season of the SM-liiga, the top level of ice hockey in Finland. 10 teams participated in the league, and Tappara Tampere won the championship.

== Standings ==
	Club	GP	W	T	L	GF	GA	Pts
1.	Tappara Tampere	36	25	5	6	216	110	55
2.	TPS Turku	36	23	3	10	187	129	49
3.	HIFK Helsinki	36	20	1	15	159	136	41
4.	KooVee Tampere	36	20	1	15	175	156	41
5.	Ässät Pori	36	19	2	15	167	144	40
6.	Ilves Tampere	36	14	6	16	171	173	34
7	Jokerit Helsinki	36	14	5	17	137	153	33
8.	Kiekko-Reipas Lahti	36	11	5	20	169	222	27
9.	Lukko Rauma	36	10	3	23	166	223	23
10.	FoPS Forssa	36	7	3	26	136	237	17

Sources: Elite Prospects;

== Playoffs ==
=== Semifinal ===
- Tappara - KooVee 3:0 (11:0, 6:1, 11:3)
- TPS - HIFK 3:2 (4:7, 2:4, 2:1, 3:0, 4:2)

=== 3rd place ===
- HIFK - KooVee 0:2 (4:5, 5:9)

=== Final ===
- Tappara - TPS 3:0 (7:2, 4:2, 9:1)

== Relegation ==
	Club	GP	W	T	L	GF	GA	Pts
1.	Lukko Rauma	6	3	1	2	32	25	7
2.	Kärpät Oulu	6	3	0	3	32	26	6
3.	FoPS Forssa	6	3	0	3	32	30	6
4.	Sport Vaasa	6	2	1	3	32	45	5
