= 1982–83 SM-liiga season =

Finnish ice hockey season

The 1982–83 SM-liiga season was the eighth season of the SM-liiga, the top level of ice hockey in Finland. 10 teams participated in the league, and HIFK Helsinki won the championship.

== Standings ==
	Club	GP	W	T	L	GF	GA	Pts
1.	Jokerit Helsinki	36	27	1	8	193	119	55
2.	HIFK Helsinki	36	22	6	8	180	128	50
3.	Ilves Tampere	36	21	3	12	179	146	45
4.	TPS Turku	36	18	5	13	145	131	41
5.	Tappara Tampere	36	18	4	14	170	139	40
6.	SaiPa Lappeenranta	36	16	5	15	150	153	37
7	Ässät Pori	36	11	8	17	160	149	30
8.	Kärpät Oulu	36	10	3	23	150	181	23
9.	Kiekko-Reipas Lahti	36	10	3	23	150	205	23
10.	Lukko Rauma	36	6	4	26	121	247	16

=== Replay for 8th place ===
- Kärpät - Kiekko-Reipas 2:7

== Playoffs ==
=== Quarterfinals ===
- Ilves - SaiPa 2:0 (4:1, 3:2)
- TPS - Tappara 1:2 (2:7, 9:5, 2:3)

=== Semifinal ===
- Jokerit - Tappara 3:0 (4:3, 3:1, 5:4)
- HIFK - Ilves 3:1 (8:1, 1:7, 6:2, 3:2 P)

=== 3rd place ===
- Ilves - Tappara 2:0 (5:3, 8:5)

=== Final ===
- Jokerit - HIFK 2:3 (4:3 P, 7:4, 2:6, 2:5, 2:3)

== Relegation ==
- HPK Hämeenlinna - Lukko Rauma 3:0 (4:1, 6:1, 3:0)
- Kärpät Oulu - JoKP Joensuu 3:2 (14:3, 6:7, 10:1, 1:4, 4:1)
