= 1984–85 SM-liiga season =

Finnish ice hockey season

SM-liiga logo introduced prior to the season

The 1984–85 SM-liiga season was the tenth season of the SM-liiga, the top level of ice hockey in Finland. 10 teams participated in the league, and Ilves Tampere won the championship.

== Standings ==
	Club	GP	W	T	L	GF	GA	Pts
1.	TPS Turku	36	24	2	10	163	124	50
2.	Kärpät Oulu	36	22	2	12	153	105	46
3.	Ilves Tampere	36	22	1	13	168	133	45
4.	Ässät Pori	36	22	0	14	166	129	44
5.	HIFK Helsinki	36	19	2	15	189	152	40
6.	Tappara Tampere	36	16	2	18	152	147	34
7	Lukko Rauma	36	13	3	20	131	149	29
8.	Jokerit Helsinki	36	13	2	21	154	176	28
9.	SaiPa Lappeenranta	36	11	3	22	127	199	25
10.	Kiekko-Reipas Lahti	36	8	3	25	111	200	19

Source: Elite Prospects

== Playoffs ==
=== Semifinal ===
- TPS - Ässät 3:2 (2:7, 2:4, 6:1, 3:2, 5:2)
- Ilves - Kärpät 3:1 (2:4, 3:2, 5:2, 5:3)

=== 3rd place ===
- Kärpät - Ässät 2:1 (7:2, 3:4, 4:1)

=== Final ===
- TPS - Ilves 2:3 (3:2, 6:1, 1:8, 2:3, 2:3)

== Relegation ==
	Club	GP	W	T	L	GF	GA	Pts
1.	SaiPa Lappeenranta	6	4	1	1	28	28	9
2.	TuTo Turku	6	3	1	2	31	17	7
3.	KalPa Kuopio	6	3	0	3	26	23	6
4.	KooKoo Kouvola	6	0	2	4	15	31	2
