= 1979–80 SM-liiga season =

Finnish ice hockey season

The 1979–80 SM-liiga season was the fifth season of the SM-liiga, the top level of ice hockey in Finland. 10 teams participated in the league, and HIFK Helsinki won the championship.

== Standings ==
| | Club | GP | W | T | L | GF | GA | Pts |
|---|---|---|---|---|---|---|---|---|
| 1. | TPS Turku | 36 | 26 | 4 | 6 | 209 | 122 | 56 |
| 2. | HIFK Helsinki | 36 | 24 | 5 | 7 | 238 | 144 | 53 |
| 3. | Kärpät Oulu | 36 | 18 | 6 | 12 | 193 | 154 | 42 |
| 4. | Ässät Pori | 36 | 18 | 5 | 13 | 189 | 167 | 41 |
| 5. | Tappara Tampere | 36 | 15 | 6 | 15 | 170 | 169 | 36 |
| 6. | Lukko Rauma | 36 | 15 | 4 | 17 | 184 | 190 | 34 |
| 7 | Kiekko-Reipas Lahti | 36 | 14 | 4 | 18 | 151 | 153 | 32 |
| 8. | Ilves Tampere | 36 | 11 | 8 | 17 | 151 | 189 | 30 |
| 9. | Jokerit Helsinki | 36 | 11 | 4 | 21 | 151 | 199 | 26 |
| 10. | KooVee Tampere | 36 | 4 | 2 | 30 | 153 | 302 | 10 |

Source: Elite Prospects

== Playoffs ==
=== Semifinal ===
- TPS - Ässät 1:3 (6:1, 3:6, 3:4 P, 2:9)
- HIFK - Kärpät 3:1 (4:3 P, 1:3, 6:3, 4:2)

=== 3rd place ===
- TPS - Kärpät 0:2 (2:12, 7:8)

=== Final ===
- HIFK - Ässät 3:0 (7:5, 4:2, 6:5)

== Relegation ==
| | Club | GP | W | T | L | GF | GA | Pts |
|---|---|---|---|---|---|---|---|---|
| 1. | SaiPa Lappeenranta | 6 | 4 | 1 | 1 | 45 | 27 | 9 |
| 2. | Jokerit Helsinki | 6 | 4 | 1 | 1 | 49 | 34 | 9 |
| 3. | HPK Hämeenlinna | 6 | 1 | 2 | 3 | 30 | 38 | 4 |
| 4. | KooVee Tampere | 6 | 1 | 0 | 5 | 22 | 47 | 2 |
