= 1977–78 SM-liiga season =

Finnish ice hockey season

The 1977–78 SM-liiga season was the third season of the SM-liiga, the top level of ice hockey in Finland. 10 teams participated in the league, and Porin Ässät won the championship.

== Standings ==
	Club	GP	W	T	L	GF	GA	Pts
1.	Tappara Tampere	36	24	4	8	169	123	52
2.	Ässät Pori	36	24	2	10	194	121	50
3.	TPS Turku	36	22	3	11	180	123	47
4.	Ilves Tampere	36	19	3	14	187	169	41
5.	HIFK Helsinki	36	16	4	16	161	144	36
6.	Kiekko-Reipas Lahti	36	17	2	17	150	167	36
7	Kärpät Oulu	36	13	4	19	176	209	30
8.	KooVee Tampere	36	11	4	21	158	214	26
9.	Lukko Rauma	36	10	5	21	176	219	25
10.	Jokerit Helsinki	36	7	3	26	125	177	17

Source: Elite Prospects

== Playoffs ==
=== Semifinal ===
- Tappara - Ilves 3:1 (5:1, 3:1, 3:4 P, 6:2)
- Ässät - TPS 3:2 (2:4, 6:2, 8:1, 1:2, 3:1)

=== 3rd place ===
- TPS - Ilves 2:1 (7:6, 2:4, 8:1)

=== Final ===
- Tappara - Ässät 1:3 (8:0, 2:3, 4:8, 3:6)

== Relegation ==
	Club	GP	W	T	L	GF	GA	Pts
1.	Lukko Rauma	6	5	1	0	41	20	11
2.	Jokerit Helsinki	6	3	1	2	39	16	7
3.	FoPS Forssa	6	3	0	3	34	47	6
4.	SaiPa Lappeenranta	6	0	0	6	22	53	0
