= 1980–81 SM-liiga season =

Finnish ice hockey season

The 1980–81 SM-liiga season was the sixth season of the SM-liiga, the top level of ice hockey in Finland. 10 teams participated in the league, and Kärpät Oulu won the championship.

== Standings ==
	Club	GP	W	T	L	GF	GA	Pts
1.	Tappara Tampere	36	26	2	8	184	115	54
2.	TPS Turku	36	22	5	9	213	141	49
3.	Kärpät Oulu	36	23	3	10	196	129	49
4.	Ässät Pori	36	20	2	14	178	158	42
5.	HIFK Helsinki	36	17	4	15	166	158	38
6.	Ilves Tampere	36	18	2	16	152	152	38
7	Kiekko-Reipas Lahti	36	15	4	17	161	147	34
8.	SaiPa Lappeenranta	36	11	4	21	128	187	26
9.	Jokerit Helsinki	36	6	3	27	114	188	15
10.	Lukko Rauma	36	7	1	28	135	252	15

Source: Elite Prospects

== Playoffs ==
=== Quarterfinal ===
- Kärpät - Ilves 2:0 (5:1, 5:2)
- Ässät - HIFK 0:2 (2:6, 4:7)

=== Semifinal ===
- Tappara - HIFK 3:0 (4:2, 9:3, 11:0)
- TPS - Kärpät 2:3 (2:4, 9:5, 6:2, 0:6, 2:3 P)

=== 3rd place ===
- TPS - HIFK 2:0 (4:3 P, 7:6)

=== Final ===
- Tappara - Kärpät 2:3 (5:2, 1:6, 13:2, 1:6, 2:5)

== Relegation ==
	Club	GP	W	T	L	GF	GA	Pts
1.	Jokerit Helsinki	6	5	0	1	48	13	10
2.	Lukko Rauma	6	5	0	1	27	27	10
3.	HPK Hämeenlinna	6	2	0	4	22	29	4
4.	KooVee Tampere	6	0	0	6	15	43	0
