= 1978–79 SM-liiga season =

Finnish ice hockey season

The 1978–79 SM-liiga season was the fourth season of the SM-liiga, the top level of ice hockey in Finland. 10 teams participated in the league, and Tappara Tampere won the championship.

== Standings ==
| | Club | GP | W | T | L | GF | GA | Pts |
|---|---|---|---|---|---|---|---|---|
| 1. | Ässät Pori | 36 | 21 | 8 | 7 | 207 | 140 | 50 |
| 2. | Tappara Tampere | 36 | 20 | 5 | 11 | 208 | 153 | 45 |
| 3. | TPS Turku | 36 | 18 | 4 | 14 | 144 | 123 | 40 |
| 4. | HIFK Helsinki | 36 | 17 | 4 | 15 | 164 | 141 | 38 |
| 5. | Kiekko-Reipas Lahti | 36 | 15 | 5 | 16 | 136 | 143 | 35 |
| 6. | Lukko Rauma | 36 | 14 | 7 | 15 | 164 | 190 | 35 |
| 7 | Ilves Tampere | 36 | 13 | 7 | 16 | 128 | 137 | 33 |
| 8. | Jokerit Helsinki | 36 | 14 | 3 | 19 | 137 | 181 | 31 |
| 9. | KooVee Tampere | 36 | 11 | 5 | 20 | 126 | 177 | 27 |
| 10. | Kärpät Oulu | 36 | 12 | 2 | 22 | 137 | 168 | 26 |

Source: Elite Prospects

== Playoffs ==
=== Semifinal ===
- Ässät - HIFK 3:0 (6:5 P, 5:3, 9:4)
- Tappara - TPS 3:2 (5:1, 6:10, 7:3, 4:8, 7:5)

=== 3rd place ===
- TPS - HIFK 2:1 (2:1, 2:10, 3:2)

=== Final ===
- Ässät - Tappara 2:3 (3:6, 3:4, 5:3, 3:2, 2:5)

== Relegation ==
| | Club | GP | W | T | L | GF | GA | Pts |
|---|---|---|---|---|---|---|---|---|
| 1. | Kärpät Oulu | 6 | 5 | 0 | 1 | 47 | 19 | 10 |
| 2. | KooVee Tampere | 6 | 4 | 0 | 2 | 26 | 18 | 8 |
| 3. | SaiPa Lappeenranta | 6 | 3 | 0 | 3 | 22 | 29 | 6 |
| 4. | FoPS Forssa | 6 | 0 | 0 | 6 | 20 | 49 | 0 |
