= Lasse Oksanen =

Finnish ice hockey player

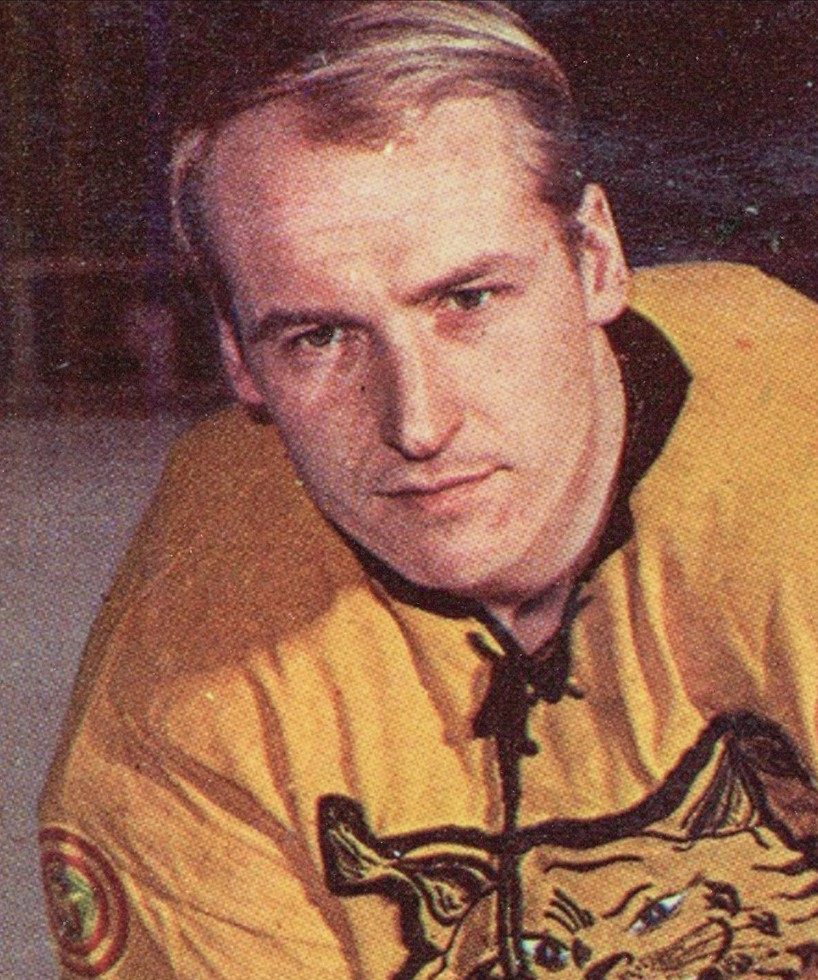
- Born: December 7, 1942 (age 82); Tampere, Finland
- Height: 5 ft 11 in (180 cm)
- Weight: 180 lb (82 kg; 12 st 12 lb)
- Position: Right Wing
- Shot: Right
- Played for: SM-liiga; Ilves; 1. Divisioona; KOOVEE; Serie A HC Gherdëina; A & O Asiago
- National team: Finland
- Playing career: 1960–1983

Lasse Kalevi Oksanen (born December 7, 1942) is a retired professional ice hockey player who mostly played in the SM-liiga. He played for Ilves. Oksanen played 23 years as a professional ice hockey player and ended his career in 1983, with the First Division team KOOVEE. He was inducted into the Finnish Hockey Hall of Fame in 1987. He also played 282 games for the Finland national men's ice hockey team, and was inducted into the IIHF Hall of Fame in 1999.

== Career statistics ==
			Regular season					Playoffs
Season	Team	League	GP	G	A	Pts	PIM	GP	G	A	Pts	PIM
1960–61	Ilves U20	Jr. A SM-sarja	—	—	—	—	—	—	—	—	—	—
1960–61	Ilves	SM-sarja	2	1	0	1	0	—	—	—	—	—
1961–62	Ilves U20	Jr. A SM-sarja	—	—	—	—	—	—	—	—	—	—
1961–62	Ilves	SM-sarja	17	3	4	7	0	—	—	—	—	—
1962–63	Ilves	SM-sarja	18	5	7	12	9	—	—	—	—	—
1963–64	Ilves	SM-sarja	17	13	10	23	12	—	—	—	—	—
1964–65	Ilves	SM-sarja	18	13	7	20	8	—	—	—	—	—
1965–66	Ilves	SM-sarja	19	8	13	21	12	—	—	—	—	—
1966–67	Ilves	SM-sarja	21	23	14	37	6	—	—	—	—	—
1967–68	Ilves	SM-sarja	19	15	11	26	4	—	—	—	—	—
1968–69	Ilves	SM-sarja	22	21	15	36	10	—	—	—	—	—
1969–70	Ilves	SM-sarja	22	32	19	51	6	—	—	—	—	—
1970–71	Ilves	SM-sarja	32	17	20	37	12	10	6	3	9	0
1971–72	Ilves	SM-sarja	26	18	19	37	10	—	—	—	—	—
1972–73	Ilves	SM-sarja	36	12	13	25	12	—	—	—	—	—
1973–74	Ilves	SM-sarja	36	23	20	43	16	—	—	—	—	—
1974–75	Ilves	SM-sarja	30	15	11	26	16	—	—	—	—	—
1975–76	HC Gherdëina	Italy	—	27	—	—	—	—	—	—	—	—
1976–77	HC Gherdëina	Italy	—	23	—	—	—	—	—	—	—	—
1977–78	Ilves	SM-liiga	35	13	16	29	4	7	2	4	6	0
1978–79	Ilves	SM-liiga	36	18	10	28	10	—	—	—	—	—
1979–80	Asiago Hockey 1935	Italy	—	24	37	61	6	—	—	—	—	—
1980–81	Ilves	SM-liiga	35	13	8	21	6	2	0	0	0	0
1981–82	Ilves	SM-liiga	36	5	13	18	2	—	—	—	—	—
1982–83	Koovee	I-Divisioona	—	—	—	—	—	—	—	—	—	—
SM-sarja totals			335	219	183	402	133	10	6	3	9	0
SM-liiga totals			142	49	47	96	22	9	2	4	6	0
