= 1967–68 Porin Ässät season =

Ässät's first season in SM-sarja

1967–68 Porin Ässät
- League: 4th SM-sarja
- 1967–68 record: 12–1–7
- Goals for: 96
- Goals against: 64

Team information
- Coach: Rauli Virtanen
- Captain: Raimo Kilpiö
- Arena: Isomäki artificial ice

The 1967–68 Porin Ässät season was the club's inaugural season. Ässät had been formed after a merger with Porin Karhut and RU-38 in June 1967 and would compete in the top-tier of ice hockey in Finland, the SM-sarja. Ässät inherited Karhut's place in the 1967 Finnish Cup, which it won after beating SaPKo 7–0 in the final. Ässät also inherited RU-38's place in the IIHF European Cup, as RU-38 had won the Finnish Championship 1967.

== Creation of Ässät ==
The Porin Ässät were established in June 1967 when two local sports clubs Rosenlewin Urheilijat-38 and Porin Karhut merged their sports operations. Although the RU-38 won the SM-sarja championship in 1967, the Rosenlew company seriously considered giving up sports activities, as Rosenlew felt that hockey did not bring enough positive publicity to the company. The leaders of Karhut and RU-38 negotiated the unification of the clubs during the spring and early summer so secretly that even the insiders of the teams did not get to know about the merger negotiations. The problem for the Karhut was the economic downturn, as the club had heavily invested in player acquisitions. The income was not enough to cover the expenses, especially after some supporters had moved to the Rosenlew club. As Rosenlew was abandoning the sports club, it was suggested that the RU-38 was simply "melted" into Karhut. When an agreement was finally reached, Rosenlew took over a large portion of Karhut's debts and promised to support the new team financially in the early years. The new club was named Porin Ässät. The birth of the club was announced at the end of June 1967. The name of the club was given by Vilho Santala, who acted as a negotiator in uniting the clubs and was elected the first chairman of Ässät. The club's logo was designed by Vesa Antikainen. The colors of the club were chosen as red, black and white.

== Season ==
Ässät's very first SM-sarja hockey game was played against IFK Helsingfors and it ended in Ässät's 7–3 victory. The biggest victory of the season came in Ässät's game against Kärpät, when Ässät beat the team 16–0. Overall, Ässät lost seven games in the 20-game season and tied once, giving Ässät a total of 12 wins and 25 points. Ässät finished fourth place. Ässät's top scorer was Veli-Pekka Ketola with 25 points.

== Finnish and European cup ==
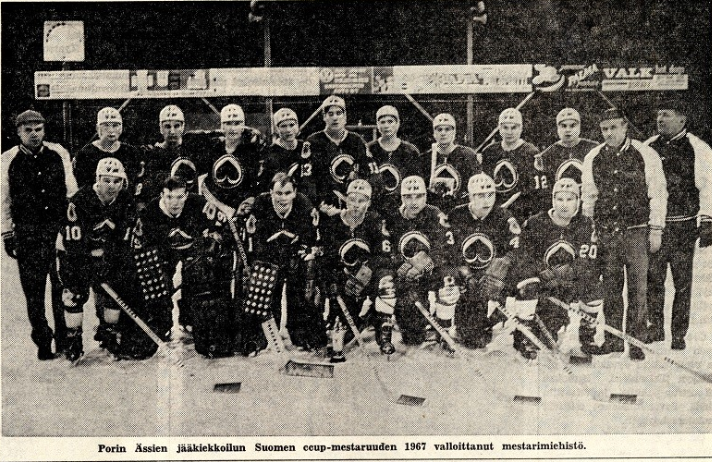
Ässät's 1967 Finnish Cup winning team

Ässät too part in the 1967 Finnish Cup. The cup was originally started by Karhut, but the merger happened in between the 2nd and the 3rd round. Karhut beat Musan Salama 7–1 in the first round. In the second round, Karhut beat HPK 8–7 and advanced to the third round. In the third round, Ässät beats rival team Lukko 5–3 and advances to the semifinal against Reipas, which it beats 5–3. In the final, Ässät goes on to beat SaPKo 7–0 and wins the Finnish Cup.

Thanks to inheriting the RU-38's spot, Ässät also played in the 1968 European Cup, where it won its first two rounds against Legia Warzaw and Vålerenga before being beaten by SC Dynamo Berlin in the quarter-finals.
