= Matti Keinonen =

Finnish ice hockey player (1941–2021)

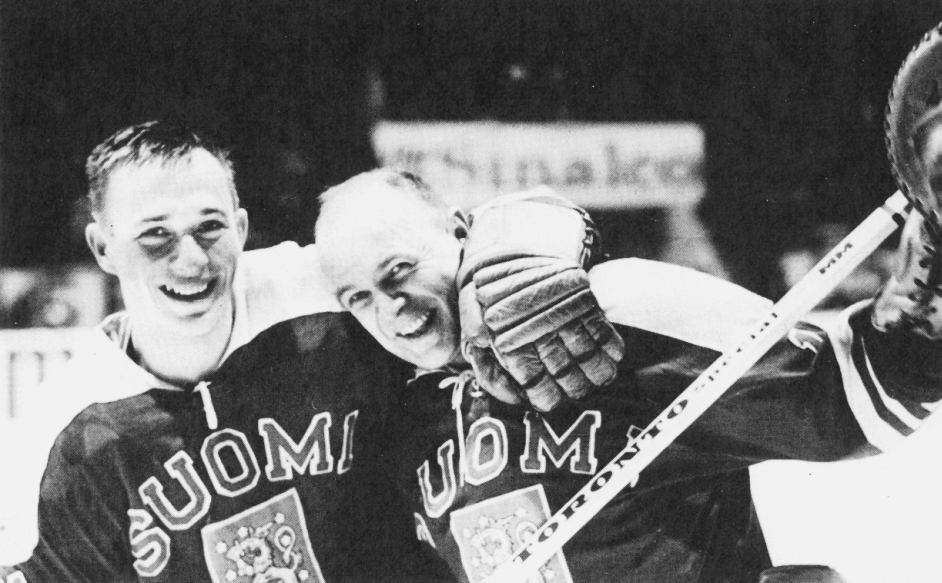
- Keinonen and Juhani Lahtinen after a Finland match against Sweden in 1965
- Born: 6 November 1941 Tampere, Finland
- Died: 27 November 2021 (aged 80) Uusikaupunki, Finland
- Height: 176 cm (5 ft 9 in)
- Weight: 74 kg (163 lb; 11 st 9 lb)
- Position: Left wing
- Shot: Left
- Played for: Lukko; RU-38; HJK; Jokerit; TPS
- Coached for: Lätkä-77; Turun Palloseura; Porin Ässät; Rauman Lukko; Raahe-Kiekko; Jää-Kotkat
- National team: Finland
- Playing career: 1960–1978
- Coaching career: 1983–2003

Matti Keinonen (6 November 1941 – 27 November 2021) was a Finnish professional ice hockey player and coach. During his career he played in the SM-sarja with Lukko Rauma, RU-38, HJK Helsinki, Jokerit, and TPS Turku. He was inducted into the Finnish Hockey Hall of Fame in 1987, and into the IIHF Hall of Fame in 2002. Keinonen was nicknamed as "Mölli".

He died in Uusikaupunki on 27 November 2021, at the age of 80.

== Honours and accolades ==
- Five-time SM-sarja All-Star.
- Finnish Championship winner in 1962–63 with Lukko and in 1966–67 with RU-38.
- Finnish Championship Runner-up in 1960–61 with Lukko and in 1971–72 with HJK.
- Finnish Championship Bronze in 1964–65 and 1968–69 with Lukko.
- SM-sarja Most Goals (26) and Most Points (43) in same season (1966-1967).
- Number retired by Lukko (#7).
- Played with the Finnish national team at two Winter Olympic Games (1968 and 1972) and at nine World Championships (1962, 1963, 1965, 1966, 1967, 1969, 1970, 1972, and 1973).
- Inducted to the Hockey Hall of Fame Finland in 1987 as Suomen Jääkiekkoleijona #50.
- Inducted into the IIHF Hall of Fame in 2002.
