= 1966–67 RU-38 season =

SM-sarja team season

1966–67 Rosenlewin Urheilijat-38
- SM-sarja champions

Team information
- Captain: Raimo Kilpiö
- Arena: Isomäki artificial ice

The 1966–67 Rosenlewin Urheilijat-38 season was the team's third season in the SM-sarja, the top-tier of ice hockey in Finland. It was also the team's last season as it was merged with the local rivals Porin Karhut to form the Porin Ässät in June 1967. RU-38 were Finnish champions in the season for the first time in their history.

Matti Keinonen was the number one scorer for RU-38 and the entire league with 43 points. Keinonen also led the league in goals with 26.

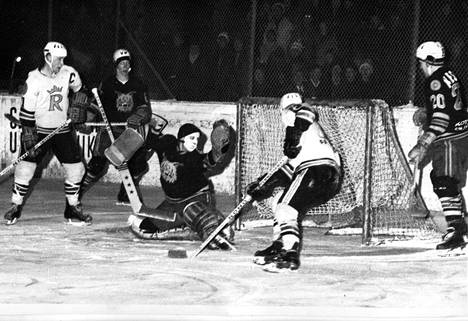
RU-38 scoring on Ilves in 1967

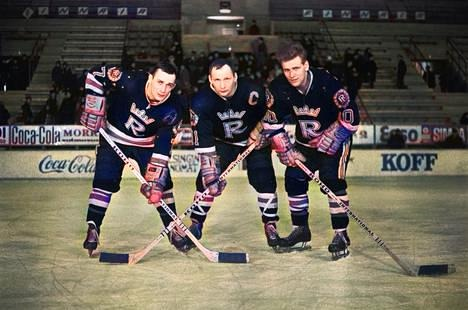
RU-38's first line; Keinonen - Kilpiö - Harjo

== Merger with Karhut ==
The Porin Ässät were established in June 1967 when Rosenlewin Urheilijat-38 and Porin Karhut merged their sports operations. Although the RU-38 won the SM-sarja championship in 1967, the Rosenlew company seriously considered giving up sports activities, as Rosenlew felt that hockey did not bring enough positive publicity to the company. The leaders of Karhut and RU-38 negotiated the unification of the clubs during the spring and early summer so secretly that even the insiders of the teams did not get to know about the merger negotiations. The problem for the Karhut was the economic downturn, as the club had heavily invested in player acquisitions. The income was not enough to cover the expenses, especially after some supporters had moved to the Rosenlew club. As Rosenlew was abandoning the sports club, it was suggested that the RU-38 was simply "melted" into Karhut. When an agreement was finally reached, Rosenlew took over a large portion of Karhut's debts and promised to support the new team financially in the early years. The new club was named Porin Ässät. The birth of the club was announced at the end of June 1967. The name of the club was given by Vilho Santala, who acted as a negotiator in uniting the clubs and was elected the first chairman of Ässät. The club's logo was designed by Vesa Antikainen. The colors of the club were chosen as red, black and white.
