= 1968–69 Porin Ässät season =

Ässät's second season in SM-sarja

1968–69 Porin Ässät
- League: 4th SM-sarja
- 1968–69 record: 9–6–7
- Goals for: 82
- Goals against: 73

Team information
- Coach: Lasse Heikkilä
- Captain: Raimo Kilpiö
- Arena: Isomäki artificial ice

The 1968–69 Porin Ässät season was the club's second season in the SM-sarja, the top-tier of ice hockey in Finland. Ässät had finished 4th place last season, also winning the Finnish Cup. Like the last season, Ässät finished 4th place.

== Regular season ==
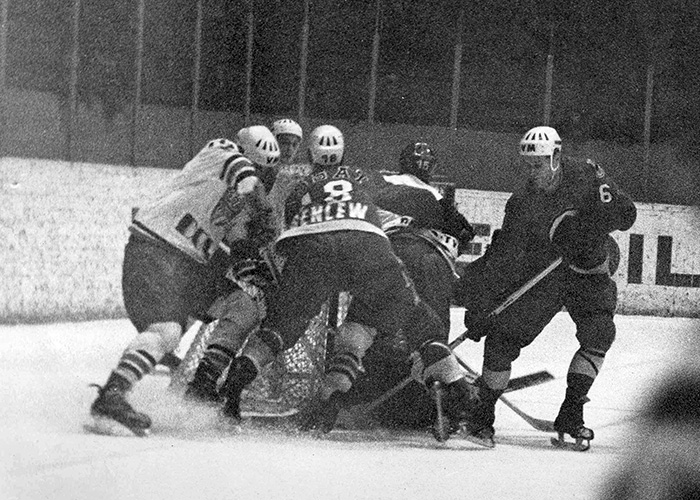
Ässät vs Tappara on the 4th of March 1969 ended in Ässät's 7–5 victory.

Ässät's season started on 7 November 1968 with a game against SaPKo, which ended in Ässät's 6–2 victory. Ässät won nine of the 22 game regular season and tied six times, which got Ässät 24 points to finish 4th in the league for the second time in a row. Ässät's top scorer was Veli-Pekka Ketola with 24 points.

Regular season results
No.	R	Date	Score	Opponent	Record
1	W	November 7, 1968	6–2	Savonlinnan Pallokerho (1968–69)	1–0–0
2	L	November 10, 1968	2–5	@ Reipas Lahti (1968–69)	1–0–1
3	L	November 17, 1968	2–5	@ Tampereen Ilves (1968–69)	1–0–2
4	T	November 21, 1968	3–3	Saimaan Pallo (1968–69)	1–1–2
5	T	November 24, 1968	3–3	Turun Toverit (1968–69)	2–1–2
6	W	November 28, 1968	9–2	@ Vehmaisten Urheilijat (1968–69)	2–2–2
7	L	December 12, 1968	0–4	@ IFK Helsingfors (1968–69)	2–2–3
8	T	December 15, 1968	3–3	@ Rauman Lukko (1968–69)	2–3–3
9	W	December 22, 1968	9–5	KooVee (1968–69)	3–3–3
10	T	January 6, 1969	1–1	@ Tampereen Tappara (1968–69)	3–4–3
11	L	January 14, 1969	0–7	Upon Pallo (1968–69)	3–4–4
12	W	January 19, 1969	6–2	@ Savonlinnan Pallokerho (1968–69)	4–4–4
13	W	January 26, 1969	3–1	Reipas Lahti (1968–69)	5–4–4
14	T	January 30, 1969	4–4	@ Saimaan Pallo (1968–69)	5–5–4
15	L	February 2, 1969	2–5	Tampereen Ilves (1968–69)	5–5–5
16	W	February 6, 1969	7–1	Vehmaisten Urheilijat (1968–69)	6–5–5
17	L	February 9, 1969	3–4	@ Turun Toverit (1968–69)	6–5–6
18	L	February 13, 1969	1–3	IFK Helsingfors (1968–69)	6–5–7
19	W	February 20, 1969	4–2	@ KooVee (1968–69)	7–5–7
20	W	February 23, 1969	3–2	Rauman Lukko (1968–69)	8–5–7
21	T	March 2, 1969	4–4	@ Upon Pallo (1968–69)	8–6–7
22	W	March 4, 1969	7–5	Tampereen Tappara (1968–69)	9–6–7
