= RU-38 (disambiguation) =

RU-38 may refer to:

- Rosenlewin Urheilijat-38, Finnish former sports club from Pori
  - RU-38 (ice hockey)
  - RU-38 (football)
- Schweizer RU-38 Twin Condor, a two or three-seat, fixed gear, low wing, twin boom covert reconnaissance aircraft
