= 1959–60 SM-sarja season =

Finnish ice hockey season

The 1959–60 SM-sarja season was the 29th season of the SM-sarja, the top level of ice hockey in Finland. 10 teams participated in the league, and Ilves Tampere won the championship.

== Regular season ==
	Club	GP	W	T	L	GF–GA	Pts
1.	Ilves Tampere	18	14	2	2	124:52	30
2.	Tappara Tampere	18	11	4	3	91:41	26
3.	Koo-Vee Tampere	18	12	2	4	83:59	26
4.	Lukko Rauma	18	10	0	8	98:67	20
5.	TPS Turku	18	8	3	7	68:81	19
6.	HJK Helsinki	18	8	2	8	83:79	18
7.	HIFK Helsinki	18	8	1	9	72:85	17
8.	SaiPa Lauritsala	18	3	5	10	57:100	11
9.	HPK Hämeenlinna	18	3	2	13	53:106	8
10.	Hermes Kokkola	18	2	1	15	60:119	5

Source: Elite Prospects

Preceded by 1958–59 SM-sarja season	SM-sarja season 1959–60	Succeeded by 1960–61 SM-sarja season
