= Aimo Sommarberg =

Aimo Sommarberg could refer to:

- Aino Malkamäki (née Sommarberg; 1894–1961), Finnish politician
- Aimo Sommarberg (footballer) (1931–2022), Finnish football defender
