= Jani Leino =

Finnish ice hockey player

- Born: March 15, 1990 (age 35) Hämeenlinna, Finland
- Height: 6 ft 2 in (188 cm)
- Weight: 203 lb (92 kg; 14 st 7 lb)
- Position: Centre
- Shot: Left
- Played for: Tappara; KOOVEE; Lempäälän Kisa
- NHL draft: Undrafted
- Playing career: 2008–2018

Jani Leino (born March 15, 1990) is a Finnish former ice hockey forward. He last played for Vire in the 3. divisioona.

Leino played two games in the SM-liiga for Tappara during the 2008–09 SM-liiga season.
