= 1958–59 SM-sarja season =

Finnish ice hockey season

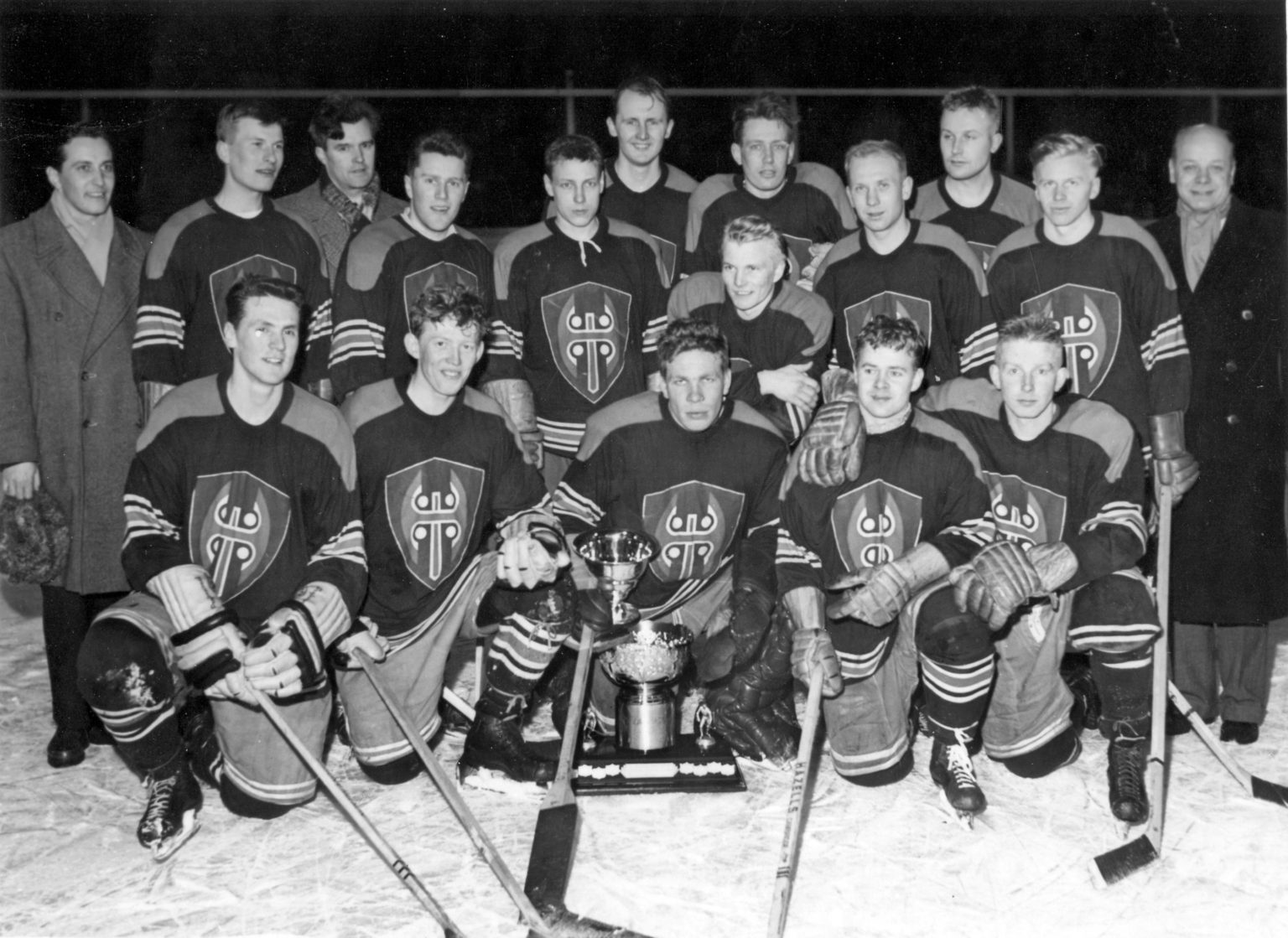
Tappara 1959 Finnish champion

The 1958–59 SM-sarja season was the 28th season of the SM-sarja, the top level of ice hockey in Finland. 10 teams participated in the league, and Tappara Tampere won the championship.

== Regular season ==
	Club	Sp	W	T	L	GF–GA	Pts
1.	Tappara Tampere	18	14	2	2	77:41	30
2.	Koo-Vee Tampere	18	4	1	3	84:55	29
3.	HIFK Helsinki	18	9	4	5	90:66	22
4.	Lukko Rauma	18	10	1	7	76:50	21
5.	TPS Turku	18	9	1	8	67:53	19
6.	Ilves Tampere	18	8	3	7	73:66	19
7.	HJK Helsinki	18	4	2	12	61:81	10
8.	Tarmo Hämeenlinna	18	5	0	13	57:84	10
9.	KalPa Kuopio	18	3	4	11	66:101	10
10.	HPK Hämeenlinna	18	5	0	13	48:102	10

Source: Elite Prospects

Preceded by 1957–58 SM-sarja season	SM-sarja season 1958–59	Succeeded by 1959–60 SM-sarja season
