= 1963–64 SM-sarja season =

Finnish ice hockey season

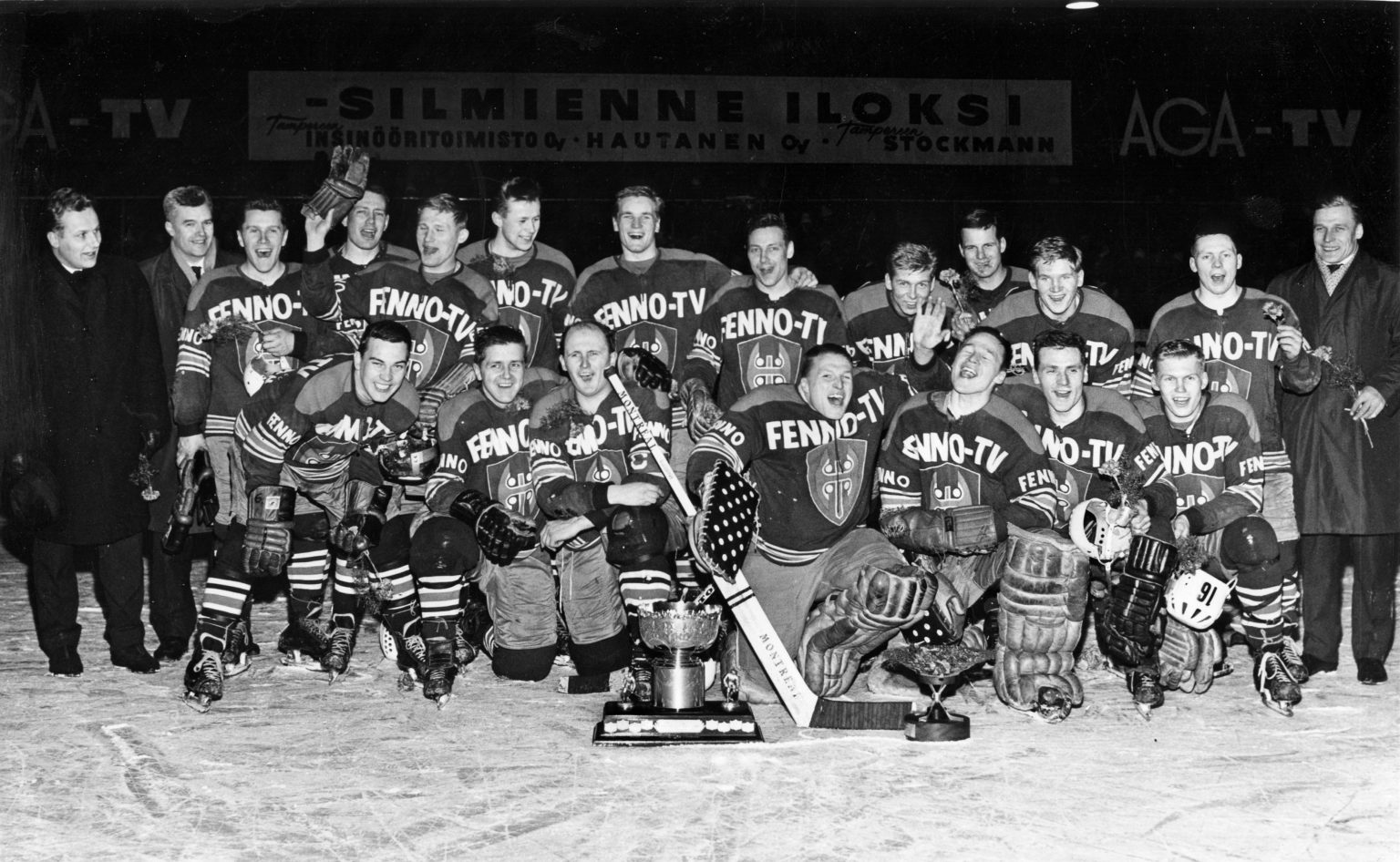
1964 champions Tappara Tampere

The 1963–64 SM-sarja season was the 33rd season of the SM-sarja, the top level of ice hockey in Finland. 10 teams participated in the league, and Tappara Tampere won the championship.

== Regular season ==
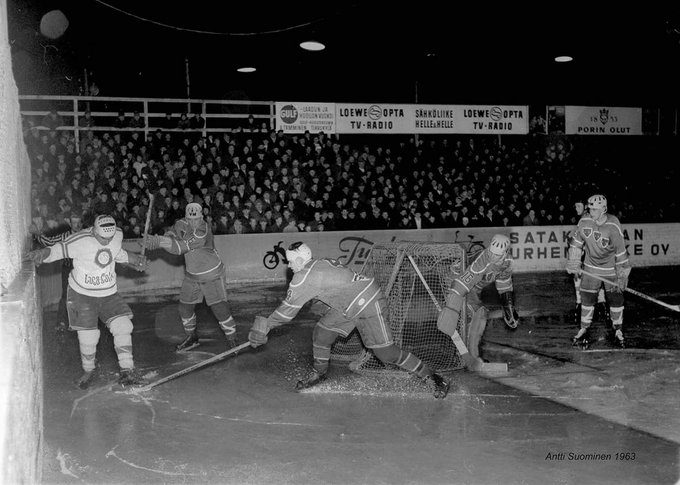
Porin Karhut – HJK in Pori.

	Club	GP	W	T	L	GF–GA	Pts
1.	Tappara Tampere	18	14	0	4	99:46	28
2.	Koo-Vee Tampere	18	14	0	4	95:54	28
3.	Ilves Tampere	18	14	0	4	81:40	28
4.	Lukko Rauma	18	9	3	6	91:52	21
5.	SaiPa Lauritsala	18	8	3	7	71:66	19
6.	Karhut Pori	18	7	4	7	72:68	18
7.	HJK Helsinki	18	7	2	9	72:84	16
8.	TPS Turku	18	7	1	10	80:60	15
9.	Vesa Helsinki	18	3	0	15	43:117	6
10.	WU Varkaus	18	0	1	17	36:153	1

Source: Elite Prospects

== Final ==
- Tappara Tampere - Koo-Vee Tampere 5:3

Preceded by 1962–63 SM-sarja season	SM-sarja season 1963–64	Succeeded by 1964–65 SM-sarja season
