= 1965–66 SM-sarja season =

Ice hockey season in Finland

The 1965–66 SM-sarja season was the 35th season of the SM-sarja, the top level of ice hockey in Finland. 12 teams participated in the league, and Ilves Tampere won the championship.

== First round ==
=== Group A ===
	Club	GP	W	T	L	GF–GA	Pts
1.	Lukko Rauma	10	6	3	1	42:25	15
2.	SaiPa Lauritsala	10	5	3	2	40:34	13
3.	Reipas Lahti	10	4	2	4	46:36	10
4.	Karhut Pori	10	3	2	5	32:43	8
5.	HJK Helsinki	10	3	2	5	29:48	8
6.	Koo-Vee Tampere	10	3	0	7	29:35	6

=== Group B ===
	Club	GP	W	T	L	GF–GA	Pts
1.	Ilves Tampere	10	8	2	0	53:20	18
2.	TPS Turku	10	6	1	3	39:29	13
3.	RU-38 Pori	10	4	3	3	35:28	11
4.	TuTo Turku	10	4	2	4	21:25	10
5.	HIFK Helsinki	10	2	1	7	19:43	5
6.	Kärpät Oulu	10	1	1	8	22:44	3

== Second round ==
=== Final round ===
	Club	GP	W	T	L	GF–GA	Pts
1.	Ilves Tampere	10	8	0	2	58:26	16
2.	Lukko Rauma	10	5	2	3	33:29	12
3.	SaiPa Lauritsala	10	5	0	5	29:30	10
4.	TPS Turku	10	4	2	4	27:29	10
5.	RU-38 Pori	10	3	2	5	33:40	8
6.	Reipas Lahti	10	1	2	7	25:51	4

=== Qualification round ===
	Club	GP	W	T	L	GF–GA	Pts
7.	Karhut Pori	10	6	1	3	42:30	13
8.	Koo-Vee Tampere	10	5	2	3	45:25	12
9.	TuTo Turku	10	6	0	4	30:31	12
10.	HJK Helsinki	10	5	1	4	40:37	11
11.	HIFK Helsinki	10	3	2	5	27:34	8
12.	Kärpät Oulu	10	2	0	8	20:47	4

Preceded by 1964–65 SM-sarja season	SM-sarja season 1965–66	Succeeded by 1966–67 SM-sarja season
