= Helkama =

Helkama Oy
- Type: Private limited company by shares
- Industry: Automotive, household appliances
- Founded: 1905
- Headquarters: Helsinki, Finland
- Key people: Matti Helkama; Eero Helkama; Pekka Helkama
- Products: Cables, Bicycles, Imports
- Revenue: $450 million USD (FY 2005)
- Number of employees: 500
- Website: www.helkama.com

Helkama is a Finnish family-owned group of companies and umbrella brand with businesses in bicycles, automobiles, household appliances, vehicle logistics, real estate and industrial technology. Its companies include bicycle manufacturer Helkama Velox, Škoda importer and retailer Helkama-Auto, household appliance company Helkama Kodinkoneet, vehicle logistics company Auto-Uuttera, real estate company Helkama-Kiinteistöt and power-electronics cooling specialist Adwatec.

Helkama has a long history of industrial manufacturing and importing. The group has operated in areas including bicycles, mopeds, household appliances, cables and automobiles. Its former cable business, Helkama Bica, was sold to both Swedish private equity investor Accent Equity and the company's management on July 12, 2024, being transferred on August 31, 2024. It was subsequently renamed Helmacab.

== History ==
Helkama was founded in Tampere in 1905 by Heikki Juho Helkama as a machinery shop and wholesaler selling bicycles and sewing machines. The business moved to Vyborg in 1915 and established its main operations in Helsinki in 1934. After the Second World War, the company expanded considerably into automobile imports and industrial manufacturing under the leadership of the founder's sons Matti, Pekka and Eero Helkama. Over its history, Helkama has been active in industries including bicycles, mopeds, household appliances, refrigeration equipment, electrical cables, automobiles and logistics.

In 1986, the Helkama companies were reorganised into separate business groups controlled by different branches of the Helkama family. The group has remained family-owned and is currently led by the fourth generation of the family. Helkama celebrated its 120th anniversary in 2025.

The Helkama name has remained widely recognised in Finland, particularly through its long history in bicycles and consumer products. Helkama is included among the bicycle brands in Taloustutkimus's annual Brand Appreciation study, in which participating brands must achieve at least five percent spontaneous awareness in the preliminary survey.

In 2025, Helkama was selected as one of ten finalists in EY Finland's Entrepreneur of the Year competition. Helkama later received the audience favourite recognition at the 2025 awards gala.

== Helkama-Auto ==
Helkama-Auto is the Finnish importer of Škoda cars, spare parts and accessories. Its cooperation with Škoda began in 1947, and according to Škoda, the relationship is the longest continuously operating importer relationship in the manufacturer's history.

Helkama's involvement in the automotive business dates back to the period after the Second World War, when the family-owned company expanded from its original bicycle and machinery trade into automobile imports and industrial activities. The Škoda import business subsequently became one of the group's main operations in Finland.

In addition to importing Škoda vehicles, Helkama-Auto has expanded into automobile retailing through its subsidiary Helkama-Autokauppa Oy. The company already operated a Škoda dealership in Espoo, and in 2025, it acquired the Škoda dealership businesses in Helsinki and Tampere from Hedin Automotive Finland. The acquired operations included new-car sales, spare-parts sales and after-sales services. Helkama-Autokauppa currently operates Škoda dealerships and service operations in Espoo, Helsinki and Tampere.

Helkama-Auto also owns Helkama Rent Oy, which operates Avis and Budget car rental services in Finland.

== Helkama Velox ==
Helkama Velox manufactures traditional and electric bicycles at its factory in Hanko, Finland. Bicycle production in Hanko began in 1953, and today the factory produces nearly 20,000 bicycles annually, ranging from city and utility bicycles to mountain bikes and electric bicycles.

Helkama's best-known bicycle models include Jopo, which was originally introduced in the 1960s, as well as long-running models such as Ainotar, Aino, Kulkuri and Oiva. In recent years, electric bicycles have become an increasingly important part of the company's business. In 2025, electric bicycles accounted for more than half of the Hanko factory's annual production and nearly 80 percent of Helkama Velox's revenue.

Some Helkama bicycle production was previously carried out abroad. Production of Jopo bicycles was gradually returned to Finland, and all Jopo production had been transferred to Hanko by the early 2010s. Production of electric bicycles was also brought back to Finland, with all electric bicycle assembly centralized in Hanko by 2019.

Helkama Velox designs and tests its bicycles in Finland for Nordic conditions. The company manufactures and assembles its current bicycle range at the Hanko factory.

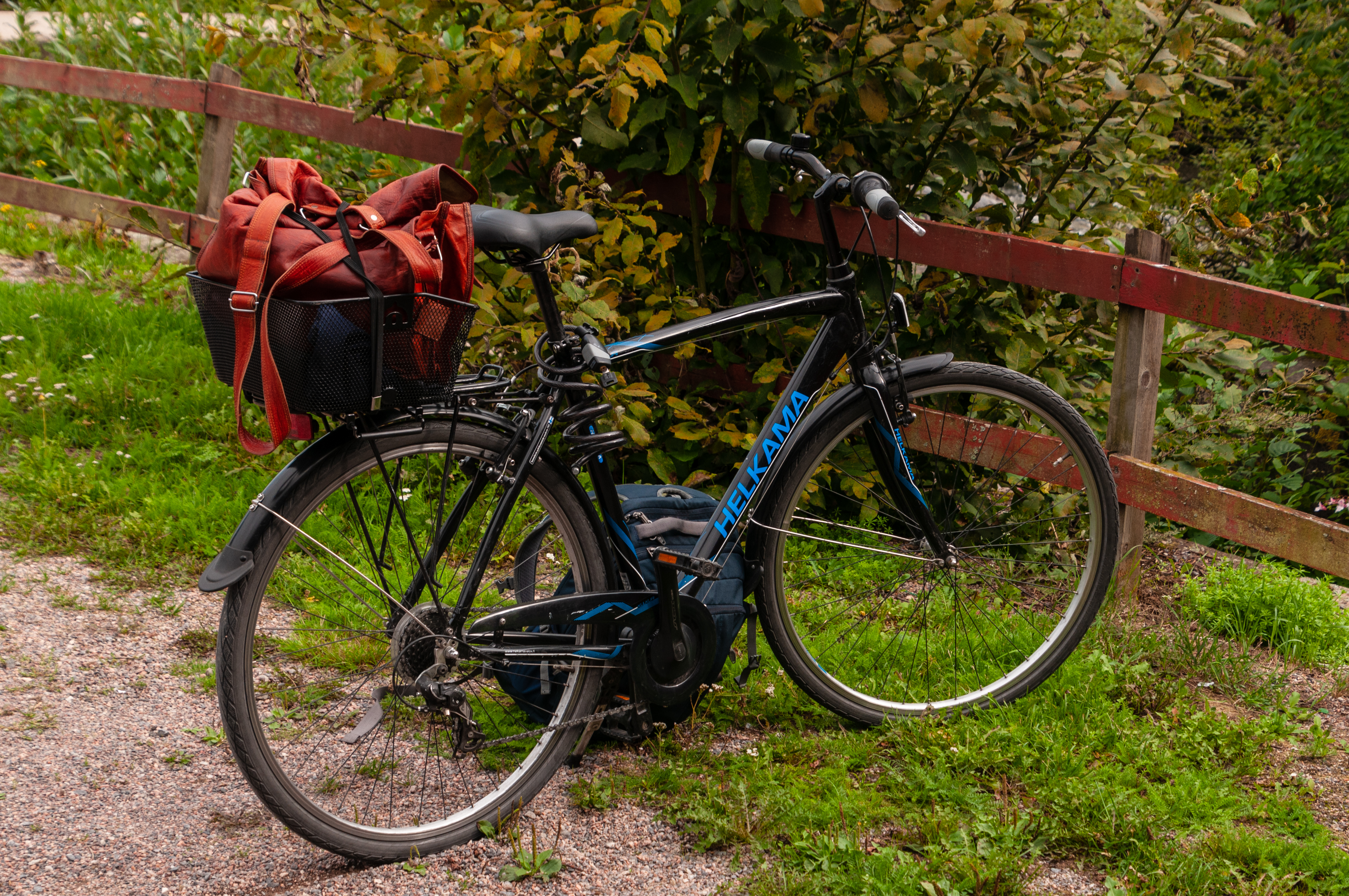
Helkama bike

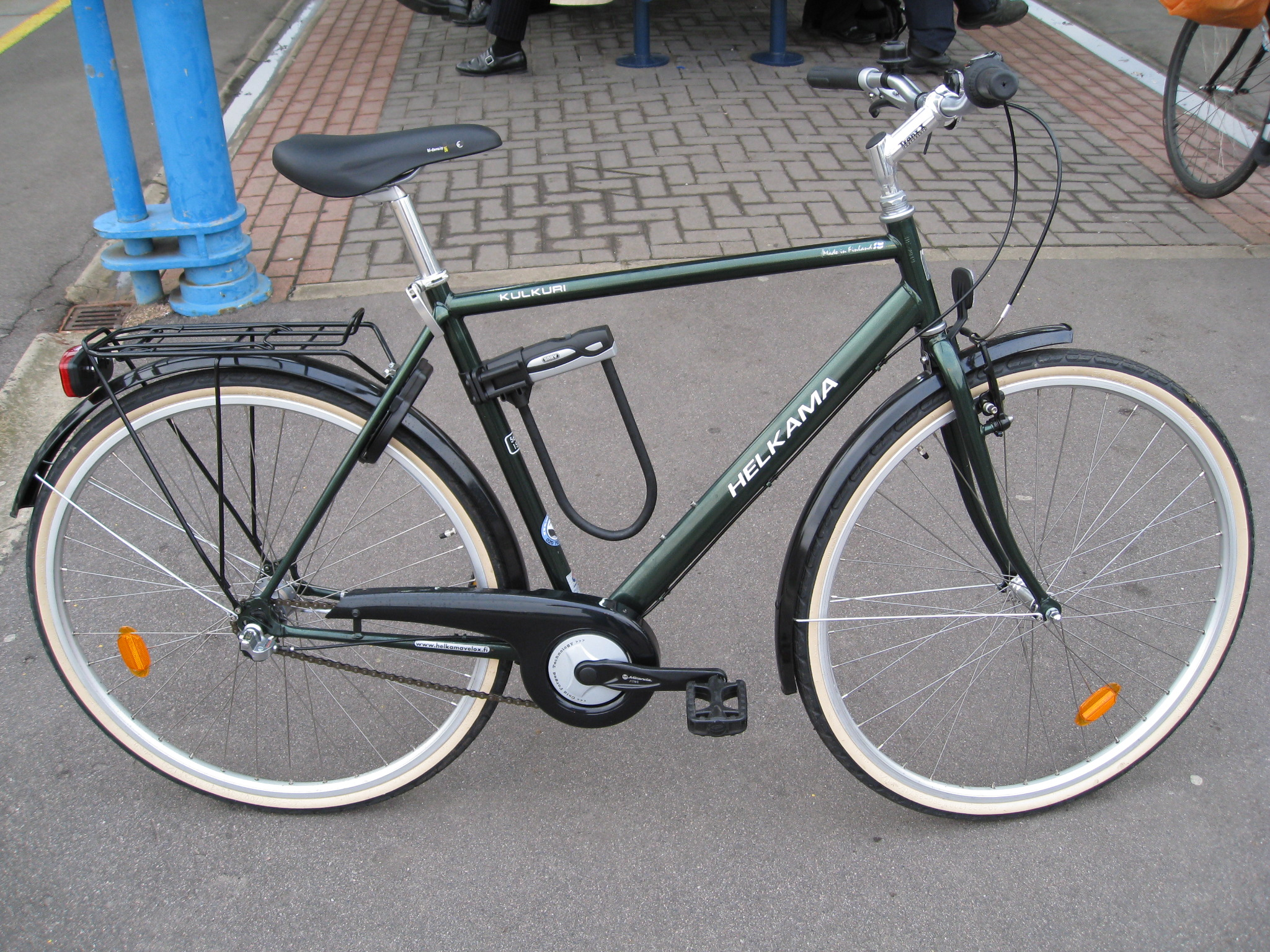
Helkama "Kulkuri"

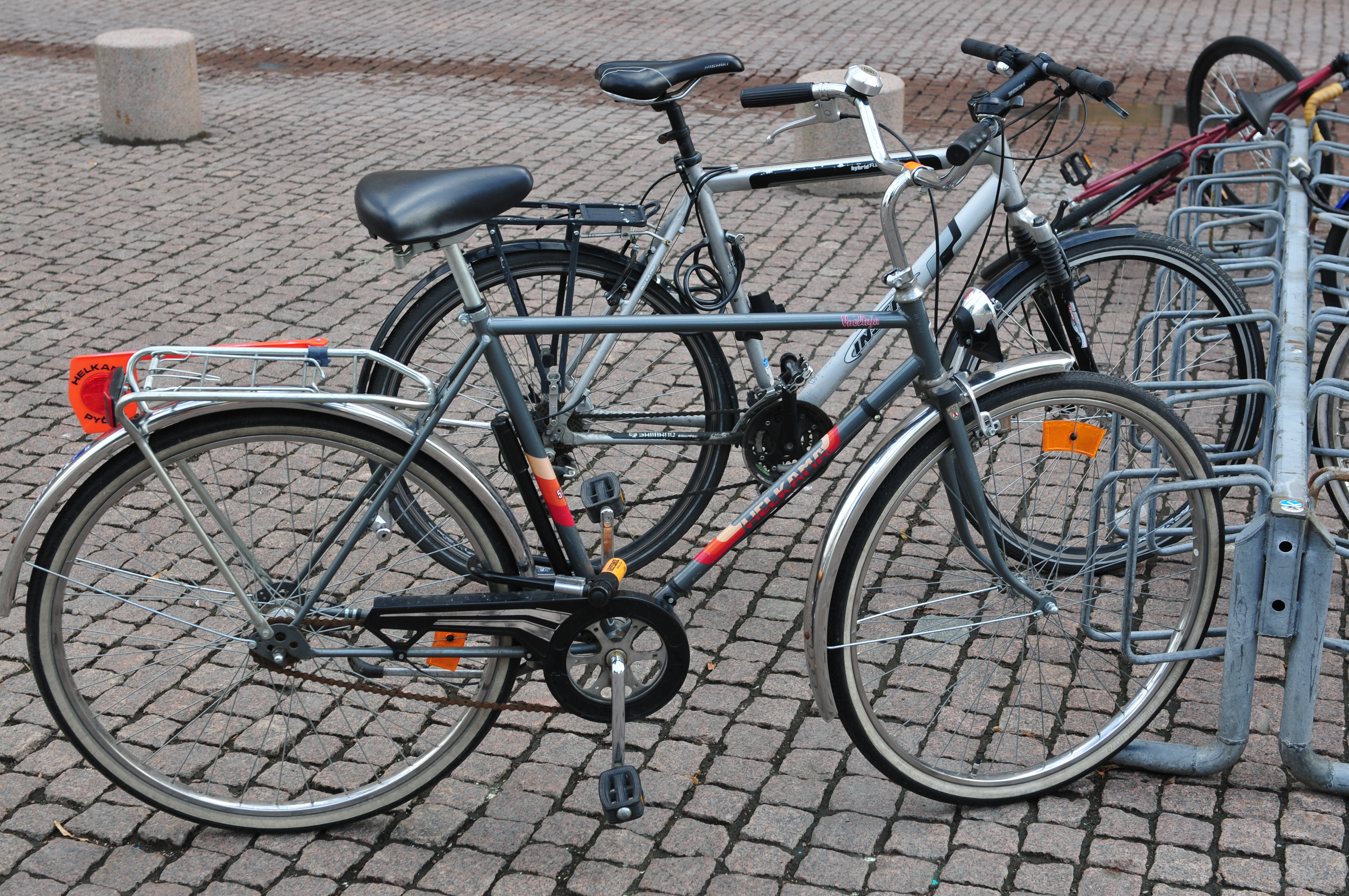
Helkama "Vaeltaja"

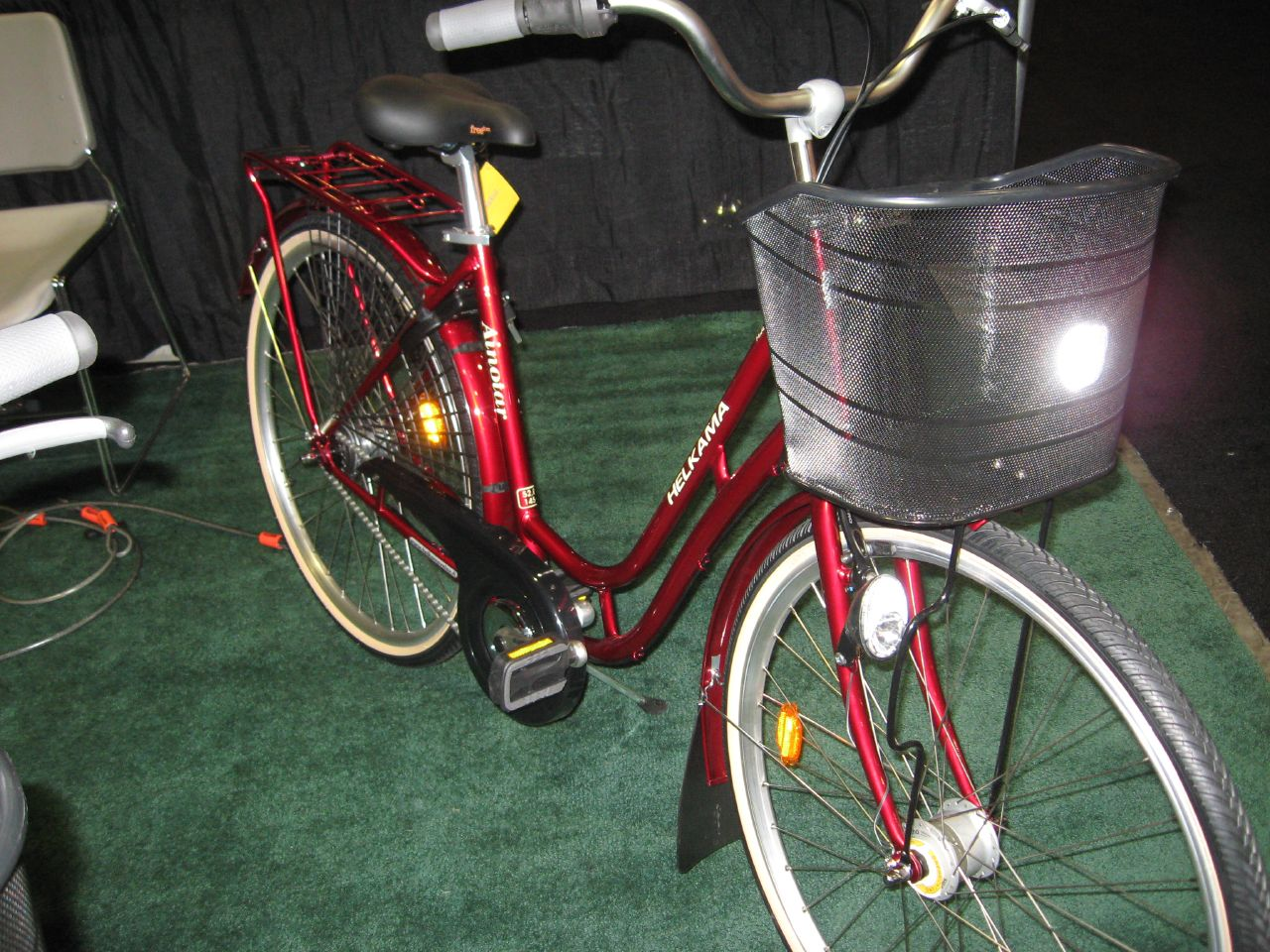
Helkama "Ainotar"

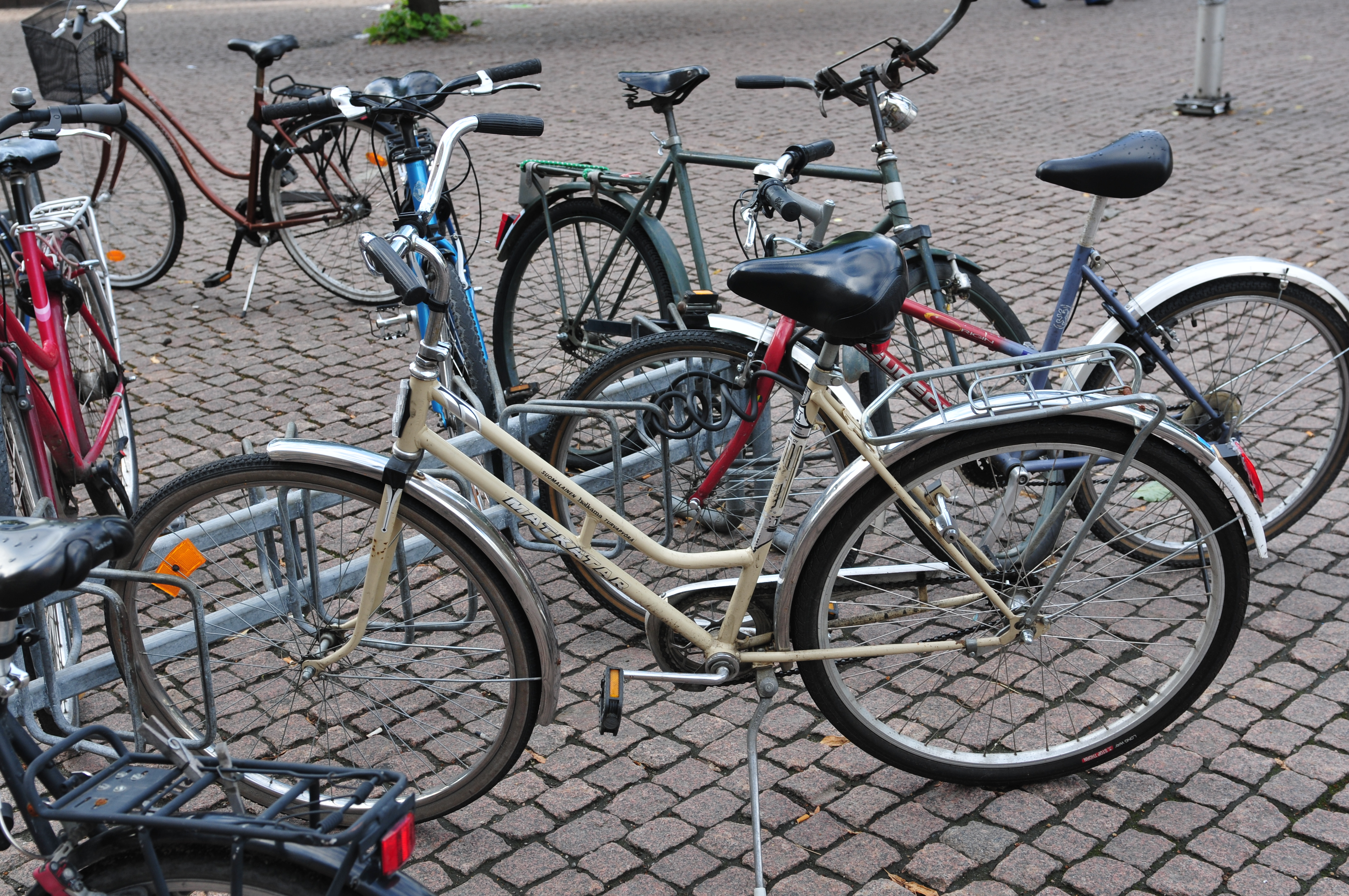
Helkama "Matkatar"

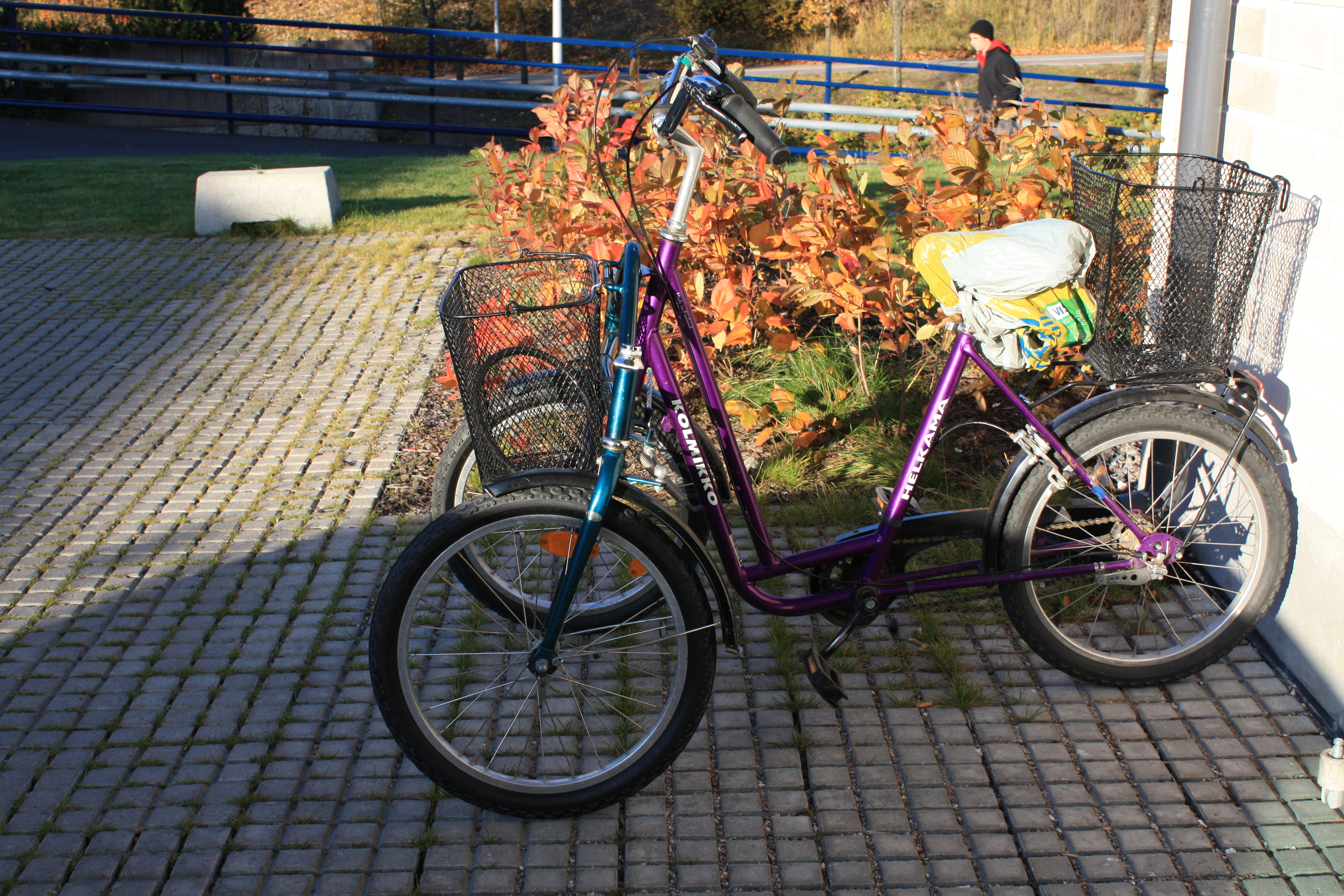
Helkama "Kolmikko" Tricycle

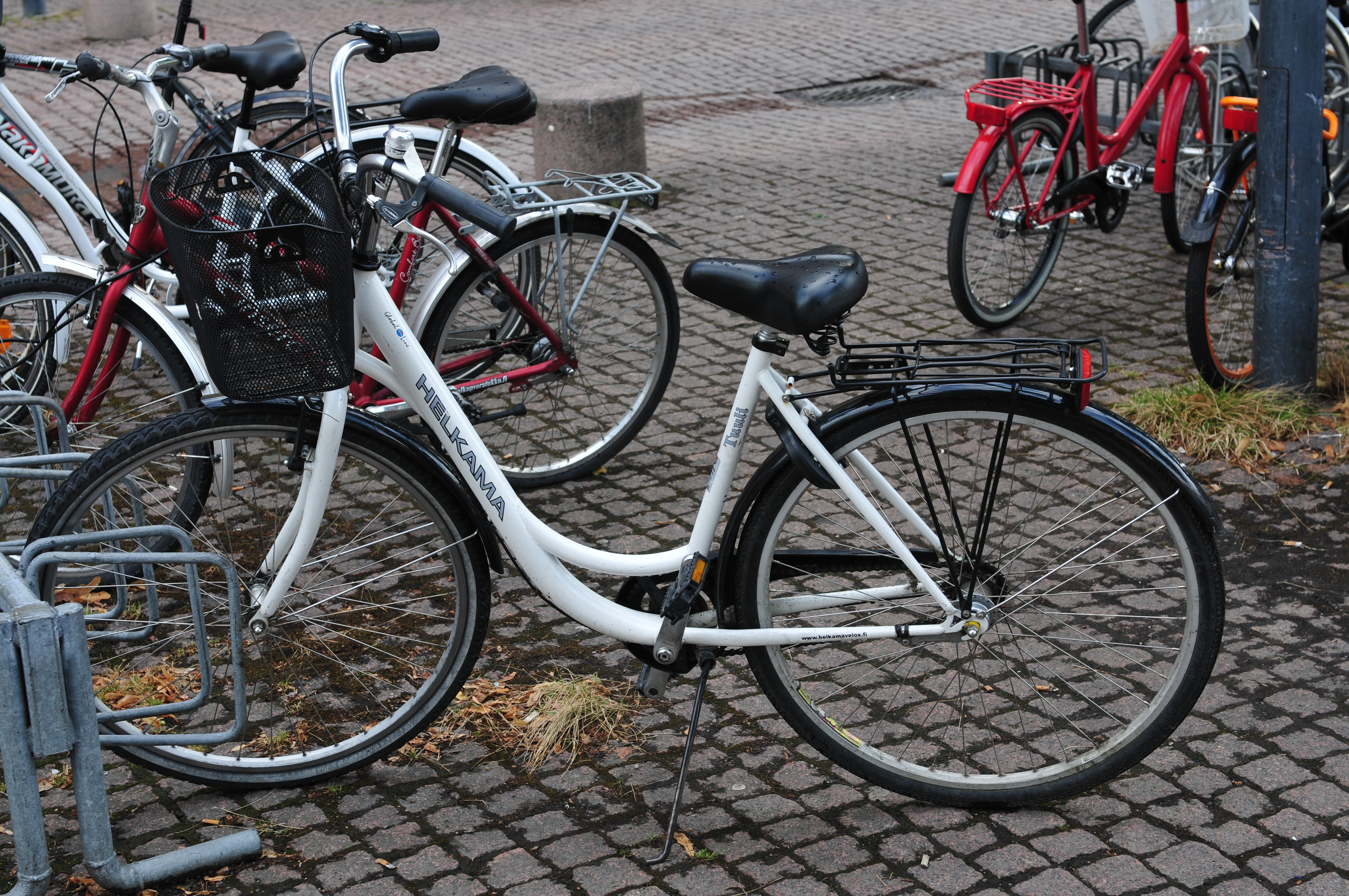
Helkama "Tuuli"

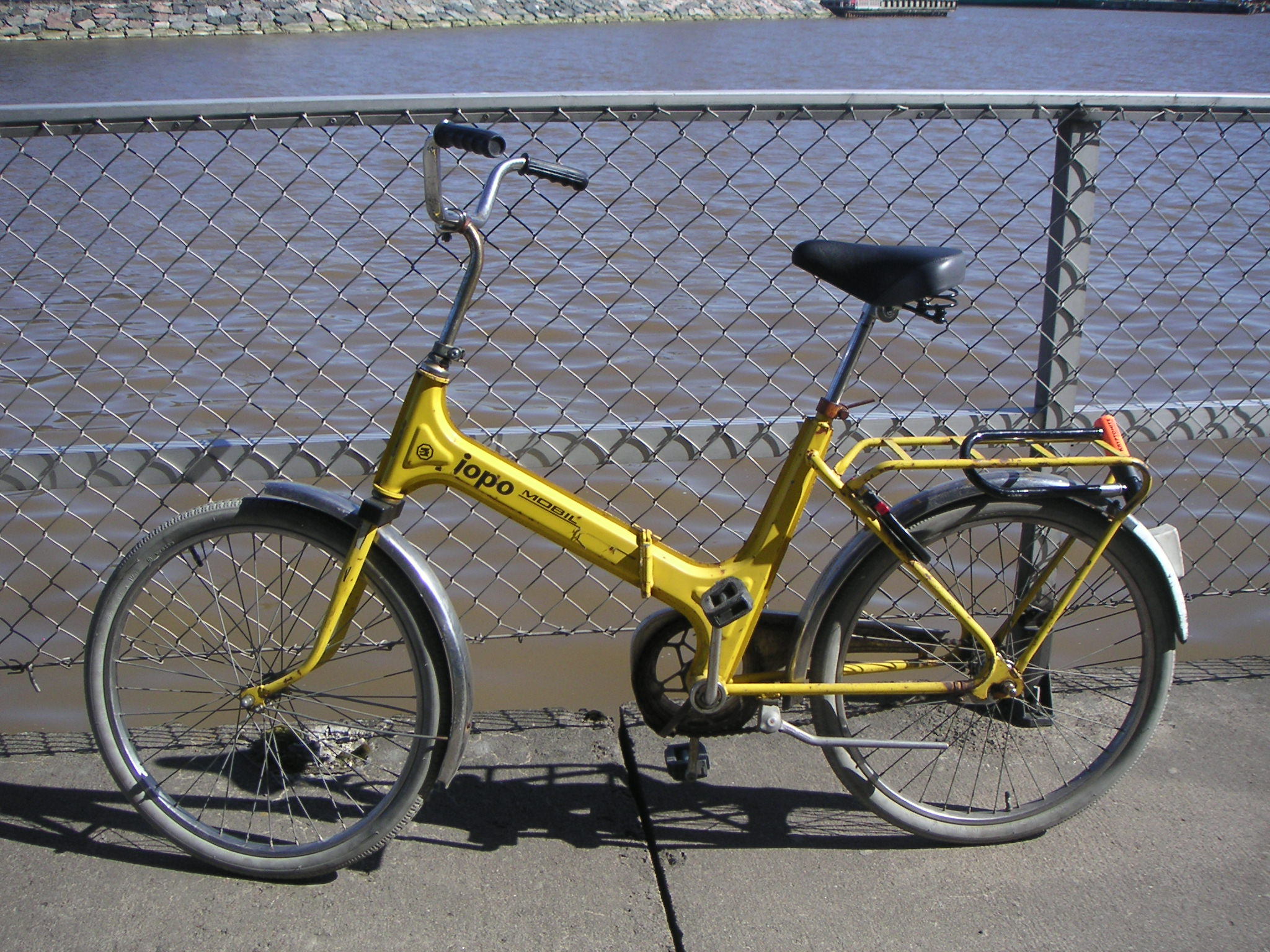
Helkama "Jopo"

== Helkama Kodinkoneet ==
Helkama has been involved in the household appliance business for several decades. For many years, the group also manufactured household appliances and refrigeration equipment through Helkama Forste Oy, which became part of the Helkama companies in 1974. Helkama Forste operated factories in Forssa, Finland, as well as in Vyborg, Norway and Hungary. In 2007, Helkama entered into an agreement with the Candy Group concerning the Helkama and Grepa household appliance brands in the Nordic countries. Manufacturing in Finland ended in 2008 when the Forssa factory was closed, while Helkama Forste continued its operations abroad. The company's operations ended in 2012, bringing Helkama's own manufacturing of household appliances and refrigeration equipment to an end.

In 2016, Helkama began cooperating with Suomen Kodinkonetukku Oy, a Finnish importer of household appliances, refrigeration equipment and consumer electronics founded in 1993. As part of the cooperation, Suomen Kodinkonetukku began importing Helkama-branded household appliances. In 2021, Helkama acquired the entire share capital of Suomen Kodinkonetukku, bringing the household appliance import business into the Helkama group. The business now operates as Helkama Kodinkoneet Oy, which imports and markets household appliances in Finland under the Helkama brand.

In November 2024, Helkama Kodinkoneet acquired the Rosenlew home appliance brand from Electrolux Group. Rosenlew's household appliance business had previously been acquired by Electrolux in 1982. The 2024 acquisition returned the Rosenlew home appliance brand to Finnish ownership. Helkama Kodinkoneet currently markets household appliances under both the Helkama and Rosenlew brands.

== Helkama Kiinteistöt ==
Helkama-Kiinteistöt Oy is a real estate investment and leasing company within the Helkama group. The company specializes in sustainable real estate investment and leases commercial properties including office, warehouse and retail premises. It also invests in startup and growth companies.

The company owns Helkama Talo in Espoo, which contains office premises as well as meeting and conference facilities available for rent, together with numerous other industrial and commercial properties.

== Uuttera yhtiöt ==
Uuttera was founded in 1945 as a forwarding company within the Helkama group. It was one of the founding shareholders of Suomen Vapaasatama Oy, established in Hanko in 1960. Today, Uuttera Oy operates primarily as a holding company, with shareholdings in Helkama-Auto, Helkama-Kiinteistöt and the vehicle logistics company Auto-Uuttera.

Auto-Uuttera traces its roots to Uuttera's vehicle logistics operations. In 2019, Assistor's vehicle logistics business was merged with Uuttera, creating Assistor-Uuttera Oy. In December 2023, Veho sold its ownership in the company to its management and Uuttera Oy, increasing Uuttera's ownership. The company was renamed Auto-Uuttera Oy in 2024.

Auto-Uuttera provides vehicle logistics, storage, pre-delivery inspection, transportation, vehicle preparation, accessory installation and vehicle taxation and registration services. The company operates primarily in Hanko and Turku, with its head office in Helsinki. According to the company, more than half of the new cars delivered to dealers and customers in Finland pass through its operations.

== Adwatec ==
Adwatec Oy designs and manufactures water-cooling systems for power electronics. Its systems are used in applications such as ship power systems, electricity transmission substations, high-power drives, compensation equipment and battery systems. Most of the company's sales are generated from large international customers.

Adwatec was founded in 2000 and began specializing in water-cooling equipment in 2007. In 2019, it became a subsidiary of Helkama Emotor Oy.

In 2024, Adwatec opened new production facilities in Tampere that tripled its production capacity. At the time, the company employed around 35 people and was expanding in response to growing global demand for power-electronics cooling solutions.
