= 1964–65 SM-sarja season =

Finnish ice hockey season

The 1964–65 SM-sarja season was the 34th season of the SM-sarja, the top level of ice hockey in Finland. 10 teams participated in the league, and Karhut Pori won the championship.

== Regular season ==
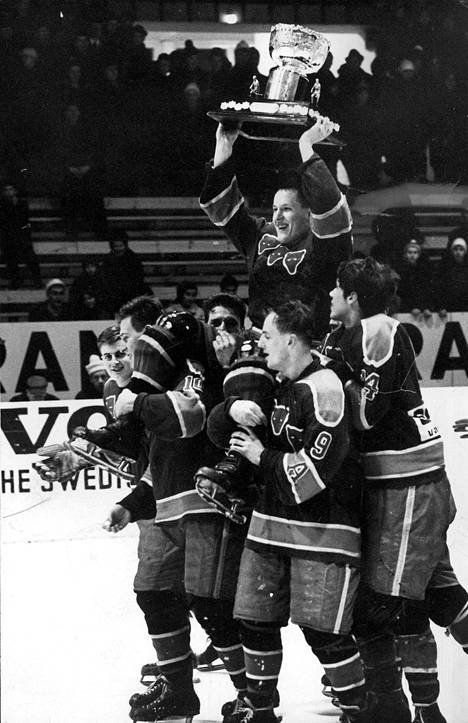
Porin Karhut celebrating the championship

	Club	GP	W	T	L	GF–GA	Pts
1.	Karhut Pori	18	10	4	4	71:44	24
2.	Ilves Tampere	18	10	4	4	70:44	24
3.	Lukko Rauma	18	10	0	8	64:43	20
4.	TPS Turku	18	9	2	7	51:63	20
5.	SaiPa Lauritsala	18	9	1	8	79:61	19
6.	RU-38 Pori	18	8	2	8	43:52	18
7.	Koo-Vee Tampere	18	7	3	8	61:61	17
8.	HIFK Helsinki	18	6	4	8	65:72	16
9.	HJK Helsinki	18	6	1	11	52:98	13
10.	Tappara Tampere	18	4	1	13	49:67	9

Source: Elite Prospects

== Final ==
- Karhut Pori - Ilves Tampere 5:1

Preceded by 1963–64 SM-sarja season	SM-sarja season 1964–65	Succeeded by 1965–66 SM-sarja season
