= Rosenlewin Urheilijat-38 (ice hockey) =

- City: Pori
- League: SM-sarja (1964-1967); Suomen Cup (1965)
- Founded: 1938
- Folded: 1967
- Home arena: Juhannuslehdon kenttä -1964; Isomäen tekojäärata 1964-1967
- Colors
- Owner(s): Rosenlew

Championships
- Finnish Champion: 1: 1967
- Finnish Cup: 1: 1965

Rosenlewin Urheilijat-38 (Finnish for Rosenlew Athletes-38) was a sports club owned by the Rosenlew factories. The club was formed in 1938 but the hockey team was formed in the 1950s. RU-38 won the Finnish Championships in ice hockey in 1967 and the Finnish Cup in 1965.

== History ==
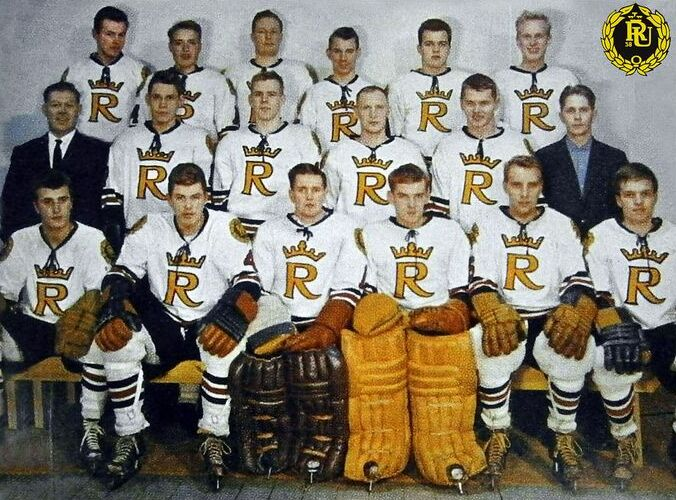
RU-38 players in 1962

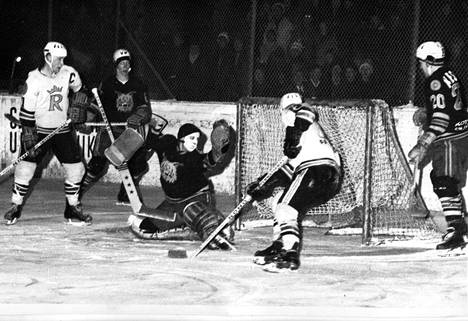
RU-38 playing against Ilves in February 1967

RU-38 won the Finnish championship in 1967 and the Finnish Cup in 1965. RU-38 got merged with Porin Karhut in 1967 to form Porin Ässät.

== Famous players ==
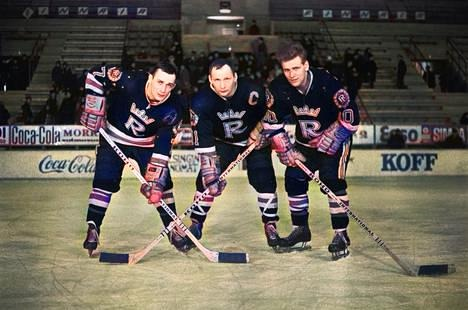
Matti "Mölli" Keinonen, Raimo Kilpiö and Matti Harju in 1966

- Raimo Kilpiö
- Matti Keinonen
- Matti Lampainen
- Kalevi Rassa
- Matti Harju

== Other ==
In 1967 RU-38 participated in a movie called Billion Dollar Brain by performing a hockey fight with Karhu-Kissat.
