= 1956–57 SM-sarja season =

Finnish ice hockey season

The 1956–57 SM-sarja season was the 26th season of the SM-sarja, the top level of ice hockey in Finland. 10 teams participated in the league, and Ilves Tampere won the championship.

== Regular season ==
=== Group A ===
	Club	GP	W	T	L	GF–GA	Pts
1.	Ilves Tampere	8	8	0	0	53:19	16
2.	Tarmo Hämeenlinna	8	4	0	4	34:31	8
3.	Jymy-Kiekko Kokkola	8	3	1	4	45:33	7
4.	Vesa Helsinki	8	3	0	5	29:61	6
5.	TK-V Tampere	8	1	1	6	22:39	3

Source: Elite Prospects

=== Group B ===
	Club	GP	W	T	L	GF–GA	Pts
1.	TPS Turku	8	6	0	2	40:22	12
2.	Tappara Tampere	8	6	0	2	33:19	12
3.	HPK Hämeenlinna	8	5	1	2	29:26	11
4.	HJK Helsinki	8	1	1	6	21:24	3
5.	Karhu-Kissat Helsinki	8	1	0	7	10:32	2

Source: Elite Prospects

==== Qualification for final ====
- TPS Turku - Tappara Tampere 8:1

== 3rd place ==
- Tarmo Hämeenlinna - Tappara Tampere 1:6/3:1

== Final ==
- Ilves Tampere - TPS Turku 4:2/7:5

Preceded by 1955–56 SM-sarja season	SM-sarja season 1956–57	Succeeded by 1957–58 SM-sarja season
