= Aimo Sommarberg (footballer) =

Finnish footballer (1931–2022)

Personal information
- Date of birth: 11 August 1931
- Place of birth: Kotka, Finland
- Date of death: 8 March 2022 (aged 90)
- Position: Defender

Senior career*
Years	Team	Apps	(Gls)
1949–1956	KTP	126	(11)
1957–1960	RU-38	–	(19)

International career
1952–1957	Finland	15	(0)
- * Club domestic league appearances and goals

Aimo Sommarberg (11 August 1931 – 8 March 2022) was a Finnish footballer who played as a defender. He made 15 appearances for the Finland national team from 1952 to 1957. Sommarberg died on 8 March 2022, at the age of 90.
