= RU-38 (football) =

Finnish sports club

- Full name: Rosenlewin Urheilijat-38
- Founded: 1938 (club); 1945 (football)
- Ground: Herralahden kenttä
- Owner: Rosenlew
- League: Mestaruussarja 1959-1960; Suomensarja 1948-1954, 1957-1958, 1961-1967; Maakuntasarja 1945-1948, 1955-1956
Home colours

Rosenlewin Urheilijat-38 (Finnish for Rosenlew Athletes-38) was a Finnish sports club based in Pori. Its sections included football from 1945 to 1967. RU-38 was disestablished when it was merged with Porin Karhut to form Porin Ässät hockey club and Porin Ässät football club.

== History ==
RU-38 was established in Pori in 1938 by Oy W.Rosenlew Ab. The sections of the club included football from the start but it didn't play any games until 1947. It played in the Maakuntasarja. Arguably RU-38's best players in the 50s were Stig-Göran Myntti, Matti Jokinen and Seppo Pelkonen.

=== Years at the top ===
RU-38 was promoted to the Mestaruussarja, the top tier of football at the time, in 1959. The first season was a success as the team was placed 2nd in the series.
