= 1967–68 SM-sarja season =

Finnish ice hockey season

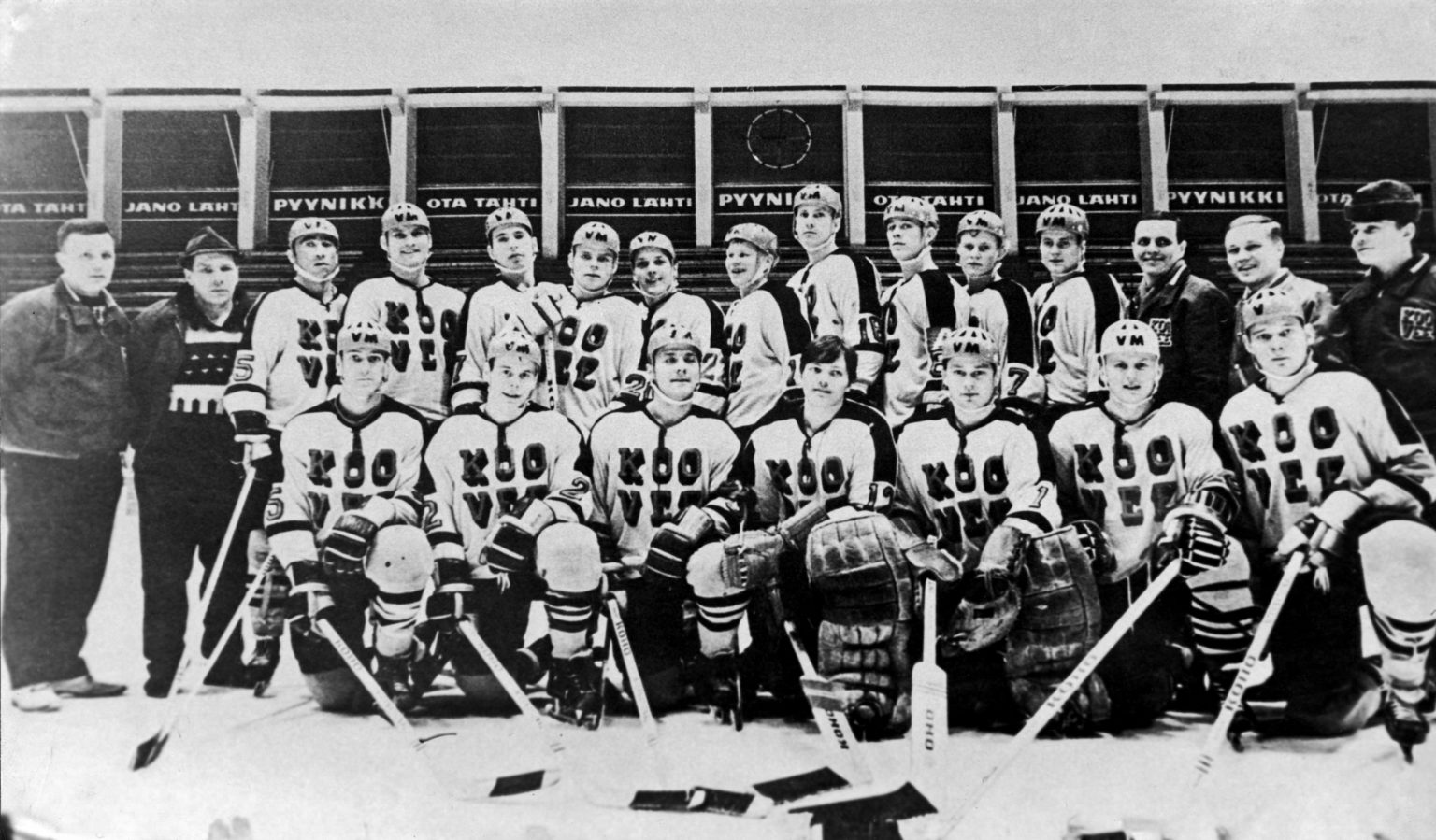

The 1967–68 SM-sarja season was the 37th season of the SM-sarja, the top level of ice hockey in Finland. 11 teams participated in the league, and Koo-Vee won the championship.

== Regular season ==
	Club	GP	W	T	L	GF–GA	Pts
1.	Koo-Vee Tampere	20	16	0	4	95:52	32
2.	Ilves Tampere	20	14	3	3	125:57	31
3.	TuTo Turku	20	13	1	6	87:55	27
4.	Ässät Pori	20	12	1	7	96:64	25
5.	Upon Pallo Lahti	20	10	3	7	73:66	23
6.	SaiPa Lappeenranta	20	8	3	9	76:75	19
7.	Reipas Lahti	20	8	1	11	63:62	17
8.	HIFK Helsinki	20	8	1	11	73:81	17
9.	Tappara Tampere	20	8	1	11	68:81	17
10.	TPS Turku	20	5	2	13	64:82	12
11.	Kärpät Oulu	20	0	0	20	21:166	0

Source: Elite Prospects

Preceded by 1966–67 SM-sarja season	SM-sarja season 1967–68	Succeeded by 1968–69 SM-sarja season
