= 1966–67 SM-sarja season =

Finnish ice hockey season

The 1966–67 SM-sarja season was the 36th season of the SM-sarja, the top level of ice hockey in Finland. 12 teams participated in the league, and RU-38 Pori won the championship.

== Regular season ==
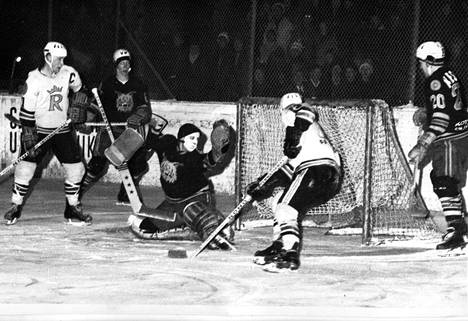
Ilves - RU-38 in 1967

	Club	GP	W	T	L	GF–GA	Pts
1.	RU-38 Pori	22	17	0	5	113:56	34
2.	TPS Turku	22	15	1	6	91:56	31
3.	Ilves Tampere	22	14	2	6	115:60	30
4.	Tappara Tampere	22	12	4	6	95:69	28
5.	TuTo Turku	22	12	3	7	80:48	27
6.	SaiPa Lappeenranta	22	13	1	8	92:73	27
7.	Reipas Lahti	22	10	2	10	82:84	22
8.	Koo-Vee Tampere	22	8	5	9	75:68	21
9.	Karhut Pori	22	7	7	8	87:82	21
10.	Lukko Rauma	22	6	2	14	73:82	14
11.	SaPKo Savonlinna	22	2	4	16	45:116	8
12.	Hermes Kokkola	22	0	1	21	24:178	1

Source: Elite Prospects

Preceded by 1965–66 SM-sarja season	SM-sarja season 1966–67	Succeeded by 1967–68 SM-sarja season
