= 1975–76 Serie A (ice hockey) season =

Italian professional ice hockey season

The 1975–76 Serie A season was the 42nd season of the Serie A, the top level of ice hockey in Italy. Nine teams participated in the league, and HC Gherdeina won the championship.

== Final round ==
	Club	Pts
1.	HC Gherdëina	43
2.	HC Bolzano	41
3.	SG Cortina	35
4.	HC Alleghe	30

== Placing round ==
	Club	Pts
5.	SV Ritten	16
6.	Asiago Hockey	11
7.	HC Meran	10
8.	HC Brunico	8
9.	Auronzo	6
