= 1979–80 Serie A (ice hockey) season =

Italian professional ice hockey season

The 1979–80 Serie A season was the 46th season of the Serie A, the top level of ice hockey in Italy. Seven teams participated in the league, and HC Gherdeina won the championship.

== First round ==
| | Club | Pts |
|---|---|---|
| 1. | HC Bolzano | 44 |
| 2. | HC Gherdëina | 42 |
| 3. | HC Meran | 34 |
| 4. | SG Cortina | 32 |
| 5. | Asiago Hockey | 28 |
| 6. | HC Brunico | 26 |
| 7. | HC Valpellice | 5 |

== Final round ==
| | Club | Pts |
|---|---|---|
| 1. | HC Gherdëina | 11 |
| 2. | HC Meran | 10 |
| 3. | HC Bolzano | 9 |
| 4. | SG Cortina | 4 |
