= 1960–61 SM-sarja season =

Finnish ice hockey season

The 1960–61 SM-sarja season was the 30th season of the SM-sarja, the top level of ice hockey in Finland. 10 teams participated in the league, and Tappara Tampere won the championship.

== Regular season ==
	Club	GP	W	T	L	GF–GA	Pts
1.	Tappara Tampere	18	13	3	2	106:37	29
2.	Lukko Rauma	18	11	3	4	102:66	25
3.	Koo-Vee Tampere	18	11	2	5	67:64	24
4.	TPS Turku	18	8	5	5	73:58	21
5.	HJK Helsinki	18	9	3	6	85:76	21
6.	HIFK Helsinki	18	6	8	4	81:68	20
7.	Ilves Tampere	18	6	4	8	70:65	16
8.	SaiPa Lauritsala	18	6	3	9	46:77	15
9.	Kärpät Oulu	18	2	1	15	41:113	5
10.	Vesa Helsinki	18	2	0	16	55:102	4

Source: Elite Prospects

Preceded by 1959–60 SM-sarja season	SM-sarja season 1960–61	Succeeded by 1961–62 SM-sarja season
