= 1962–63 SM-sarja season =

Finnish ice hockey season

The 1962–63 SM-sarja season was the 32nd season of the SM-sarja, the top level of ice hockey in Finland. 10 teams participated in the league, and Lukko Rauma won the championship.

== Regular season ==
	Club	GP	W	T	L	GF–GA	Pts
1.	Lukko Rauma	18	15	0	3	94:41	30
2.	Tappara Tampere	18	13	3	2	99:43	29
3.	Ilves Tampere	18	11	4	3	72:45	26
4.	Koo-Vee Tampere	18	11	3	4	94:56	25
5.	HJK Helsinki	18	8	2	8	63:72	18
6.	Karhut Pori	18	7	2	9	73:54	16
7.	Vesa Helsinki	18	6	1	11	52:96	13
8.	SaiPa Lauritsala	18	5	2	11	47:69	12
9.	TP-V Tampere	18	4	1	13	57:106	9
10.	HIFK Helsinki	18	1	0	17	44:113	2

Preceded by 1961–62 SM-sarja season	SM-sarja season 1962–63	Succeeded by 1963–64 SM-sarja season
