= Finnish Cup (ice hockey) =

Ice hockey competition in Finland

Finnish Cup of ice hockey
- Sport: Ice hockey
- Founded: 1955
- No. of teams: 50 (2022)
- Most recent champion: Kiekko-Espoo (2022)
- Most titles: Ketterä (3)
- Broadcaster: Discovery+
- Related competitions: Mestis; Suomi-sarja; 2. Divisioona

The Finnish Cup (Suomen Cup in Finnish) is the national ice hockey cup competition in Finland. It was played from 1955-1958 and from 1964-1971. The Finnish Cup returned to the competition program in autumn 2017.

The 2022 Finnish Cup was attended by all Mestis and Suomi-sarja teams and 24 teams from the 2. Divisioona, for a total of 50 teams. The 2023 cup was cancelled due to lack of participants.

== Champions ==
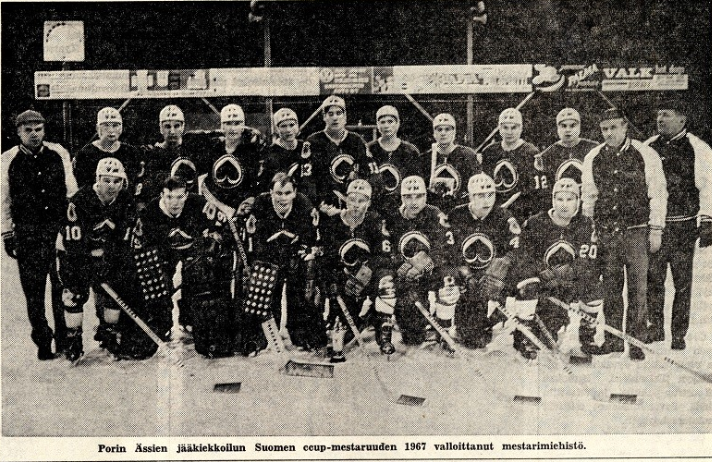
Porin Ässät won the Finnish Cup in 1967 beating SaPKo 7–0 in the final

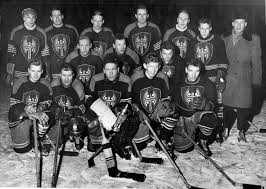
Tappara with the Finnish Cup trophy in 1957

Year	Champion	Runner-up	Score
1955	TPS Turku	Ilves	4:1
1956	TPS Turku	Tarmo Hämeenlinna	7:1
1957	Tappara	Pallo-Veikot	8:0
1958	Ilves	SaiPa	3:2
1959–1963 not played
1964	Lukko	Tappara	3:2
1965	RU-38	SaiPa	3:2
1966	Lahden Reipas	Tappara	8:6
1967	Ässät	SaPKo	7:0
1968	Koo-Vee	SaPKo	10:2
1969	Lukko	Ilves	4:3
1970	HJK Helsinki	Jokerit	7:5
1971	Ilves	SaiPa	10:2
1972–2016 not played
2017	TUTO Hockey	SaPKo	4:1
2018	Ketterä	KeuPa HT	5:2
2019	Ketterä	SaPKo	4:1
2020	Cancelled due to COVID-19		
2021	Ketterä	Kiekko-Espoo	2:1
2022	Kiekko-Espoo	IPK	3:2 SO
2023	Cancelled due to lack of participants		
