= 1968–69 SM-sarja season =

Finnish ice hockey season

The 1968–69 SM-sarja season was the 38th season of the SM-sarja, the top level of ice hockey in Finland. 12 teams participated in the league, and HIFK Helsinki won the championship.

== Regular season ==
	Club	GP	W	T	L	GF–GA	Pts
1.	HIFK Helsinki	22	18	2	2	106:45	38
2.	Ilves Tampere	22	14	4	4	129:63	32
3.	Lukko Rauma	22	13	2	7	80:62	28
4.	Ässät Pori	22	9	6	7	82:73	24
5.	Upon Pallo Lahti	22	10	3	9	89:69	23
6.	TuTo Turku	22	10	3	9	70:70	23
7.	Reipas Lahti	22	10	2	10	64:74	22
8.	Tappara Tampere	22	10	1	11	73:85	21
9.	Koo-Vee Tampere	22	9	2	11	86:89	20
10.	SaPKo Savonlinna	22	7	1	14	75:94	15
11.	SaiPa Lappeenranta	22	5	4	13	59:90	14
12.	VehU Tampere	22	2	0	20	47:146	4

Source: Elite Prospects

Preceded by 1967–68 SM-sarja season	SM-sarja season 1968–69	Succeeded by 1969–70 SM-sarja season
