= Rosenlewin Urheilijat-38 =

Finnish sports club

- Short name: RU-38
- Sport: Association football, Ice hockey, Bandy, Sport of athletics, Wrestling
- Founded: 1938
- Disbanded: 1967
- Based in: Pori
- Colors

Rosenlewin Urheilijat-38, RU-38 for short, was a sports club based in Pori, Finland. It was founded in 1938 by the W. Rosenlew Company. The club was best known by its football and ice hockey sections. In 1967 RU-38 merged with another local club, Karhut, forming a new club named Ässät.

The athletes of RU-38 were usually semi-professionals. They had a job at the company's factories and could use their working hours in training.

== Football ==
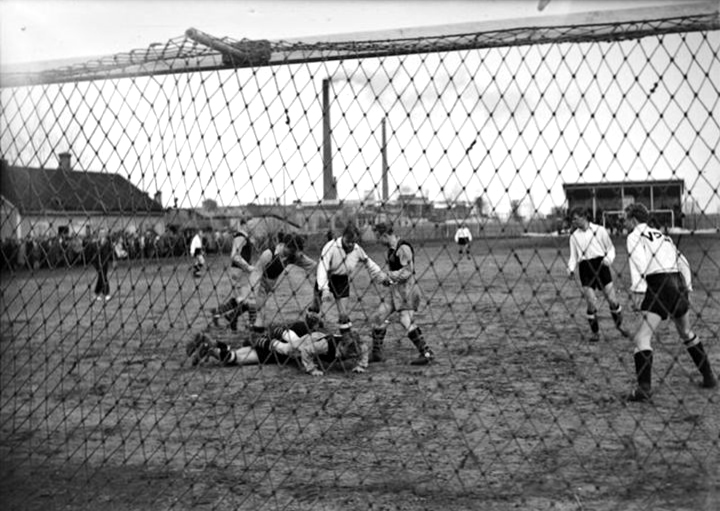
RU-38 vs VPS on 23.4 1951

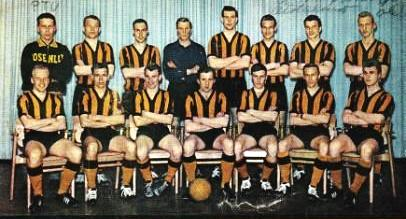
RU-38 football team picture from 1963

In the 1950s RU-38 recruited several Finnish national team players, such as Aimo Sommarberg and Stig-Göran Myntti and was promoted to the national top league in 1958. The next season club finished 2nd in Mestaruussarja. 1960 RU-38 played in the Finnish Cup final by losing 1–3 for FC Haka.

After RU-38 was merged with Karhut, Ässät inherited RU-38's football section.

=== Season to season ===
Season	Level	Division	Section	Administration	Position	Movements
1938-44						Did not participate
1945-46	Tier 3	Maakuntasarja (Third Division)	Satakunta	Finnish FA (Suomen Pallolitto)	5th	
1946-47	Tier 3	Maakuntasarja (Third Division)	Satakunta	Finnish FA (Suomen Pallolitto)	2nd	
1947-48	Tier 3	Maakuntasarja (Third Division)	Satakunta	Finnish FA (Suomen Pallolitto)	1st	Promotion Playoff - Promoted
1948	Tier 2	Suomensarja (First Division)	North Group	Finnish FA (Suomen Palloliitto)	3rd	
1949	Tier 2	Suomensarja (First Division)	West Group	Finnish FA (Suomen Palloliitto)	5th	
1950	Tier 2	Suomensarja (First Division)	West Group	Finnish FA (Suomen Palloliitto)	5th	
1951	Tier 2	Suomensarja (First Division)	West Group	Finnish FA (Suomen Palloliitto)	3rd	
1952	Tier 2	Suomensarja (First Division)	West Group	Finnish FA (Suomen Palloliitto)	6th	
1953	Tier 2	Suomensarja (First Division)	West Group	Finnish FA (Suomen Palloliitto)	5th	
1954	Tier 2	Suomensarja (First Division)	West Group	Finnish FA (Suomen Palloliitto)	10th	Relegated
1955	Tier 3	Maakuntasarja (Third Division)	North Group II	Finnish FA (Suomen Pallolitto)	1st	Promotion Playoff
1956	Tier 3	Maakuntasarja (Third Division)	West Group I	Finnish FA (Suomen Pallolitto)	1st	Promotion Playoff - Promoted
1957	Tier 2	Suomensarja (First Division)	West Group	Finnish FA (Suomen Palloliitto)	4th	
1958	Tier 2	Suomensarja (First Division)	West Group	Finnish FA (Suomen Palloliitto)	1st	Promoted
1959	Tier 1	Mestaruussarja (Premier League)		Finnish FA (Suomen Palloliitto)	2nd	
1960	Tier 1	Mestaruussarja (Premier League)		Finnish FA (Suomen Palloliitto)	10th	Relegated
1961	Tier 2	Suomensarja (First Division)	West Group	Finnish FA (Suomen Palloliitto)	2nd	
1962	Tier 2	Suomensarja (First Division)	West Group	Finnish FA (Suomen Palloliitto)	3rd	
1963	Tier 2	Suomensarja (First Division)	West Group	Finnish FA (Suomen Palloliitto)	6th	
1964	Tier 2	Suomensarja (First Division)	West Group	Finnish FA (Suomen Palloliitto)	4th	
1965	Tier 2	Suomensarja (First Division)	West Group	Finnish FA (Suomen Palloliitto)	2nd	Promotion Playoff
1966	Tier 2	Suomensarja (First Division)	West Group	Finnish FA (Suomen Palloliitto)	3rd	
1967	Tier 2	Suomensarja (First Division)	West Group	Finnish FA (Suomen Palloliitto)	1st	Promotion Group 1st - Promoted, Merged with Karhut to form Ässät

- 2 seasons in Mestaruussarja
- 16 seasons in Suomensarja
- 5 seasons in Maakuntasarja

== Ice hockey ==
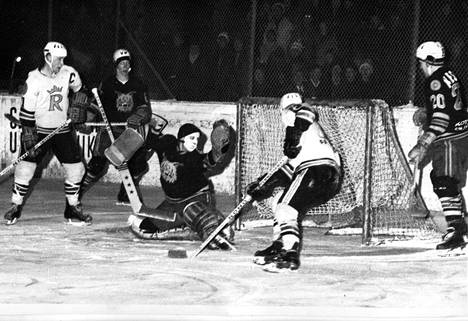
RU-38 playing against Ilves in February 1967

RU-38 was promoted to the top hockey league SM-sarja in 1964. Club won the Finnish championship in 1967. RU-38 also made a short appearance in British espionage film Billion Dollar Brain that was partly shot in Finland. They performed a hockey fight with another Finnish team Karhu-Kissat.

== Other sports ==
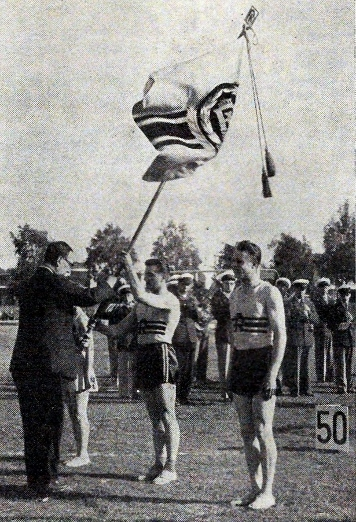
RU-38 athlete holding up a flag on 15 June 1954

The most notable other athletes representing RU-38 were 1500-metre world record holder Olavi Salonen and 1960 Olympics pole vault bronze medalist Eeles Landström.

The club also had bandy on its programme.

== Honors ==
- Football:

Finnish championship: runners-up 1959
Finnish Cup: runners-up 1960
Football Association of Finland Satakunta district champions: 1950, 1951, 1953, 1954, 1956, 1957, 1959, 1960, 1961, 1962, 1963, 1966, 1967

- Ice hockey

Finnish champions: 1967
Finnish Cup winners: 1965

== See also ==
- Porin Karhut
- Porin Ässät
- Porin Ässät football
