= Rosenlew =

Former Finnish enterprise

Oy W. Rosenlew Ab
- Trade name: Rosenlew
- Type: Osakeyhtiö
- Industry: Engineering industry
- Founded: Pori, Finland, 1853
- Defunct: 1987
- Fate: Acquired by Rauma-Repola
- Successor: Sampo Rosenlew; Electrolux; Rosenlew-RKW
- Headquarters: Pori, Finland
- Products: Ships agricultural machinery timber, paper and pulp domestic appliances and other consumer goods

Oy W. Rosenlew Ab was a Finnish multi-industrial company that operated between 1853 and 1987. It was one of the largest industrial companies in Finland. The production facilities were located mainly in Pori.

Rosenlew's home appliance business was acquired by Electrolux in 1982. Electrolux continued to use the Rosenlew brand for home appliances in Finland and manufactured refrigerators in Pori until 1998. In 2024, Electrolux sold the Rosenlew home appliance brand to the Finnish Helkama Group. The brand is currently used for home appliances marketed in Finland by Helkama Kodinkoneet Oy.
