= Lukko =

Finnish ice hockey team

Rauman Lukko
- City: Rauma, Finland
- League: Liiga
- Founded: 1936
- Home arena: Kivikylän Areena (capacity: 5,400)
- Colours: Blue, yellow
- Owners: Contineo Oy; Rauman Lukko Oy
- General manager: Kalle Sahlstedt
- Head coach: Tomi Lämsä
- Captain: Heikki Liedes
- Website: raumanlukko.fi
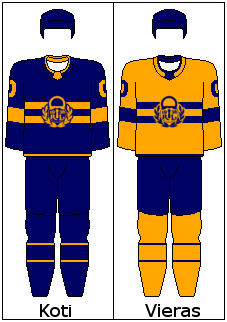

Championships
- Playoff championships: 1963, 2021

Rauman Lukko (Finnish for "lock") is a Finnish sports club based in Rauma, Finland, best known for its men's professional ice hockey team. The club was founded as Rauma Woodin Lukko in 1936. The representative team currently plays in the Finnish Liiga, the premier men's professional ice hockey league in Finland. They play their home games in the Äijänsuo Arena, which has a capacity of 5,400 spectators. Lukko won the SM-sarja in 1963 and won the Liiga championship in 2021. Until 2023 the club also had a top-tier women's representative ice hockey team, which played in the Naisten Liiga, and a top-tier women's representative pesäpallo team, which plays in the Superpesis.

== Honours ==
=== Domestic ===
Liiga

- (gold) (Kanada-malja) Winners (1): 2020–21
- (silver) Runners-up (1): 1987–88
- (bronze) 3rd place (4): 1993–94, 1995–96, 2010–11, 2013–14

SM-sarja

- (gold) Winners (1): 1962–63
- (silver) Runners-up (2): 1960–61, 1965–66
- (bronze) 3rd place (2): 1964–65, 1968–69

Other awards for the club:

- Harry Lindblad trophy (SM-Liiga regular season winner, since 1975): 2021, 2025

=== Pre-season ===
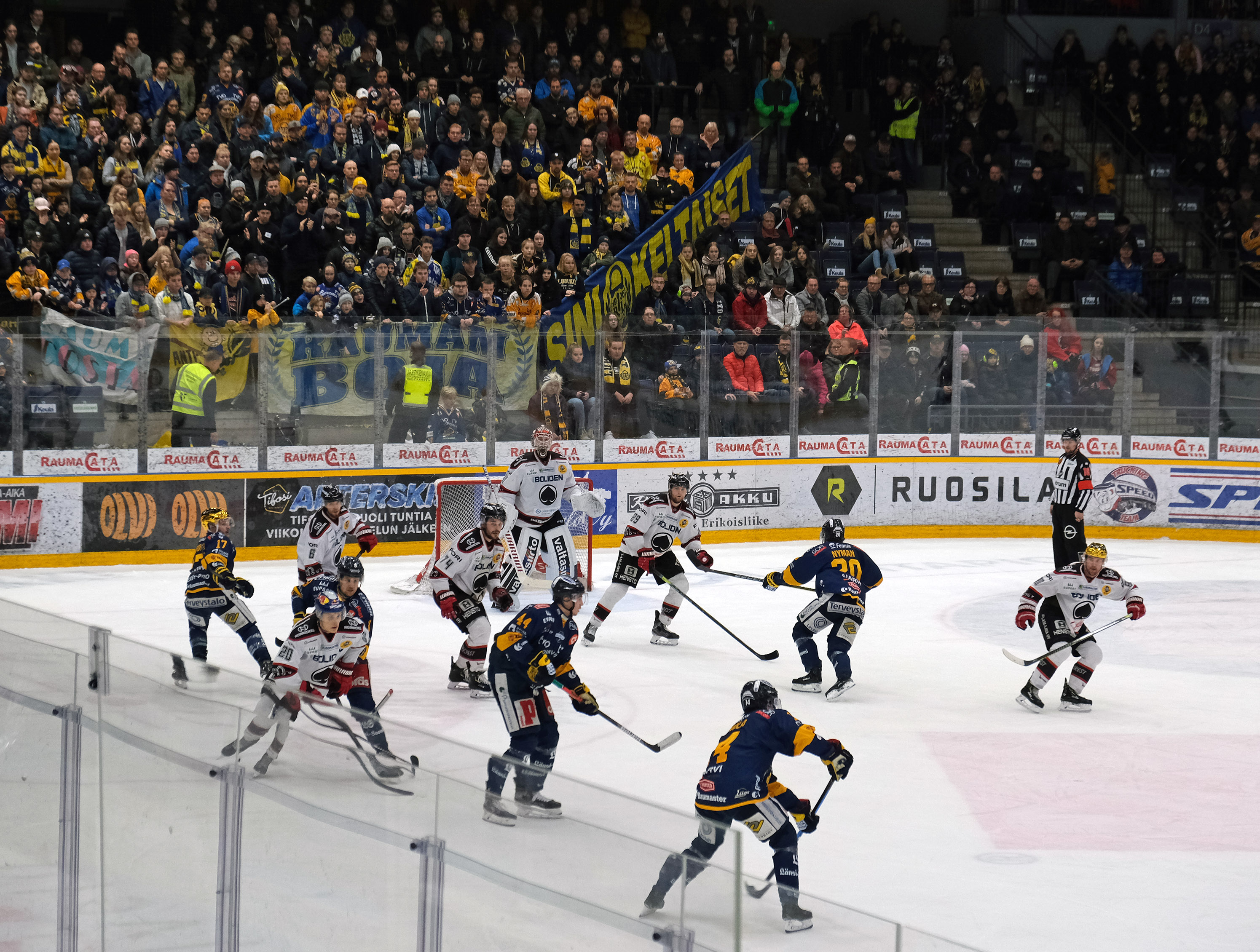
Lukko-Ässät in 2019 (Satakunnan derby)

Finnish Cup

- (gold) Winners (2): 1964, 1969

== Players ==
=== Current roster ===
Updated 15 May 2026

| No. | Nat | Player | Pos | S/G | Age | Acquired | Birthplace |
|---|---|---|---|---|---|---|---|
| 38 | (Finland) | Niclas Almari (A) | D | L | 28 | 2022 | Espoo, Finland |
| 16 | (Canada) | Alex Beaucage | RW | R | 25 | 2025 | Trois-Rivières, Québec, Canada |
| 40 | (United States) | Derek Daschke | D | L | 28 | 2025 | Troy, Michigan, United States |
| 71 | (Finland) | Kalle Ervasti | D | R | 23 | 2021 | Oulu, Finland |
| 86 | (Canada) | Éric Gélinas (C) | D | L | 35 | 2024 | Vanier, Ontario, Canada |
| 47 | (Finland) | Topias Haapanen | LW | L | 28 | 2025 | Pirkkala, Finland |
| 90 | (Finland) | Lenni Hämäläinen | RW | L | 23 | 2021 | Espoo, Finland |
| 48 | (Finland) | Henri Ikonen (A) | LW | L | 32 | 2022 | Savonlinna, Finland |
| 14 | (Finland) | Aarne Intonen | C | L | 25 | 2025 | Lieto, Finland |
| 18 | (Canada) | Steven Jandric | LW | L | 29 | 2023 | Prince George, British Columbia, Canada |
| 10 | (Finland) | Atte Joki | C | L | 19 | 2025 | Nokia, Finland |
| 39 | (Finland) | Markus Kartano | G | L | 18 | 2025 | Rauma, Finland |
| 51 | (Finland) | Onni Korkka | D | L | 25 | 2019 | Rauma, Finland |
| 24 | (Finland) | Jami Krannila | C | L | 25 | 2023 | Pori, Finland |
| 88 | (Canada) | Antoine Morand | C | L | 27 | 2023 | Châteauguay, Québec, Canada |
| 56 | (Sweden) | Anton Olsson | D | L | 23 | 2024 | Helsingborg, Sweden |
| 5 | (Canada) | Alex Peters | D | L | 30 | 2024 | Blyth, Ontario, Canada |
| 33 | (Finland) | Vili Pulakka | LW | L | 20 | 2025 | Somero, Finland |
| 32 | (Finland) | Antti Raanta | G | L | 37 | 2025 | Rauma, Finland |
| 93 | (Finland) | Mikael Ruohomaa (A) | C | L | 37 | 2025 | Alastaro, Finland |
| 25 | (Finland) | Antti Saarela | C | L | 25 | 2025 | Laitila, Finland |
| 30 | (Finland) | Daniel Salonen | G | R | 20 | 2022 | Espoo, Finland |
| 31 | (Finland) | Jooa Sammalniemi | G | L | 19 | 2025 | Tampere, Finland |
| 9 | (Sweden) | Jakob Stenqvist | D | R | 28 | 2023 | Mora, Sweden |
| 23 | (Ukraine) | Daniil Trakht | RW | R | 23 | 2023 | Dnipropetrovsk, Ukraine |
| 15 | (Finland) | Jirko Tukiainen | D | L | 21 | 2025 | Tampere, Finland |
| 6 | (Finland) | Leo Tuuva | RW | R | 20 | 2025 | Lappeenranta, Finland |
| 43 | (Finland) | Arttu Välilä | D | L | 19 | 2025 | Rauma, Finland |
| 12 | (Czech Republic) | Petr Věchet | RW | R | 19 | 2025 | Zlin, Czech Republic |
| 34 | (Finland) | Nuutti Viitasalo | D | R | 27 | 2024 | Raisio, Finland |
| 17 | (Sweden) | Pathrik Westerholm | C | L | 34 | 2023 | Karlskrona, Sweden |
| 27 | (Sweden) | Ponthus Westerholm | RW | L | 34 | 2023 | Karlskrona, Sweden |

=== Honored members ===
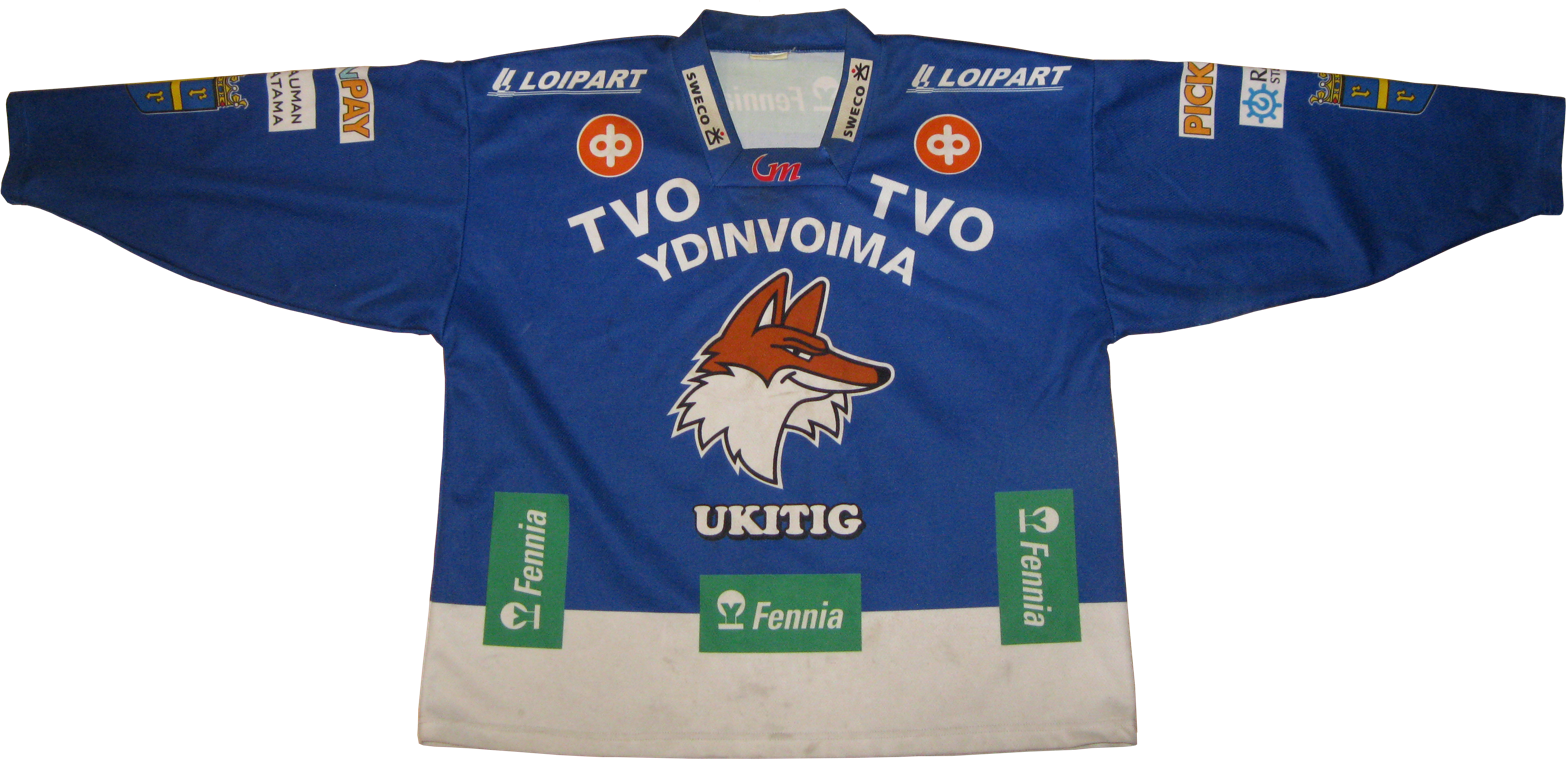
Fox logo that was used in 2001–2012. It has been the team's alternative logo since the 2012–13 season

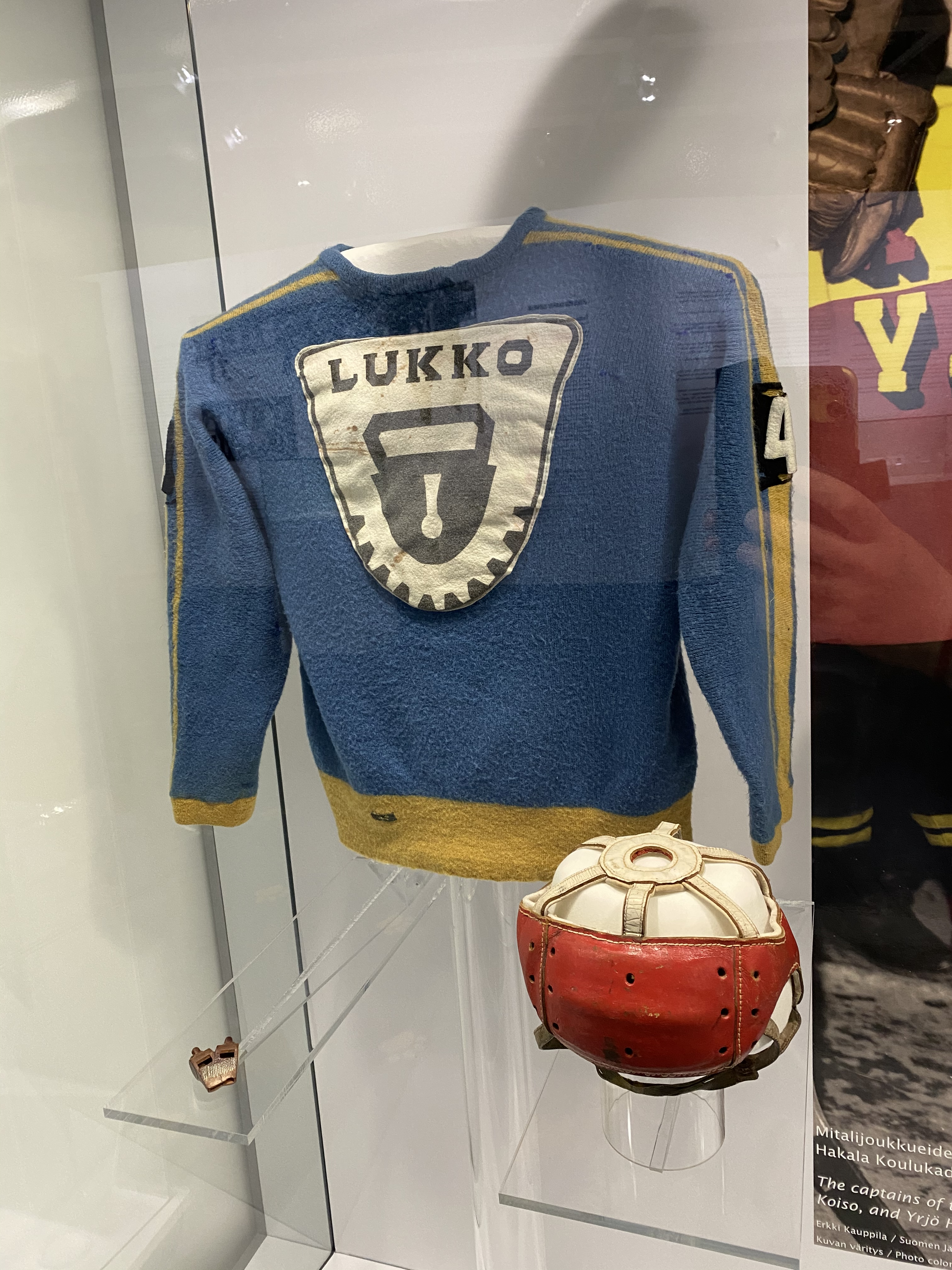
1962–63 season Lukko jersey

- 4 Teppo Rastio, Jouni Peltonen
- 7 Matti Keinonen
- 8 Jorma Vehmanen
- 13 Jari Torkki
- 26 Matti Forss
- 35 Petri Vehanen
- 77 Erik Hämäläinen

=== NHL players ===
- (Canada) Glenn Anderson
- (Canada) Sheldon Brookbank
- (United States) Hal Gill
- (Finland) Tuomas Grönman
- (Finland) Ilkka Heikkinen
- (Finland) Jarmo Myllys
- (Finland) Janne Niskala
- (Finland) Esa Pirnes
- (Canada) Dwayne Roloson
- (Latvia) Jānis Sprukts
- (Finland) Iiro Tarkki
- (Sweden) Mikael Tellqvist
- (Canada) Shayne Toporowski
- (Finland) Jari Torkki
- (Denmark) Mikkel Bödker
- (Denmark) Frans Nielsen
- (Denmark) Philip Larsen
- (Canada) Aaron Gagnon
- (Finland) Petteri Nummelin
- (Finland) Antti Raanta
- (United States) Chris VandeVelde
