= Koovee (ice hockey) =

- City: Tampere, Finland
- League: Mestis
- Founded: 1929
- Dissolved: 2024
- Home arena: Hakametsä
- Colours
- Owner: Koovee Jääkiekko ry
- General manager: Vesa Leinonen
- Head coach: Jyrki Rantala
- Captain: Tero Kalela
- Website: koovee.fi/jaakiekko/

Koovee ry, stylized as KOOVEE ry, was a Finnish professional ice hockey team based in Tampere. They played in the Mestis, the second-tier league of Finland.

Koovee played in the country's top-tier leagues, SM-sarja and SM-liiga in the 1950–51 season, then from 1953 to 1957 and again from 1958 until 1980.

The team was initially named Tampereen Kilpa-Veljet ry (TK-V) until 1967.

Koovee played in Tampere at the Hakametsä, which holds about 7300 spectators.

== See also ==
- Koovee sport club
- Ilves
- Tappara
