= Raimo Kilpiö trophy =

Ice hockey award

Raimo Kilpiö Trophy
- Sport: Ice hockey
- Awarded for: player who has shown the most exemplary sportsmanship and behavior, as well as top-level competence in the ranks of their team

History
- First award: 1953–54 SM-sarja season
- Most wins: Kimmo Rintanen (4)
- Most recent: Miika Roine; Pelicans

The Raimo Kilpiö trophy is an ice hockey trophy awarded by the Finnish Liiga to the player who has shown the most sportsmanship and good behaviour as well as high quality performance for their team. It is named after Raimo Kilpiö who played in the top level of Finnish ice hockey for 21 years in 1953-77.

== Winners ==
Season	Winner	Team	Win #
1953–54	Esko Rekomaa	HIFK	1
1954–55	Seppo Liitsola	TBK	1
1955–56	Teppo Rastio	Lukko	1
1956–57	Aki Salonen	TPS	1
1957–58	Jouni Seistamo	Tappara	1
1958–59	Yrjö Hakala	Tappara	1
1959–60	Raimo Kilpiö	Ilves	1
1960–61	Pentti Simola	Vesa Helsinki	1
1961–62	Kari Aro	HIFK	1
1962–63	Pauli Hyväri	SaiPa	1
1963–64	Heino Pulli	TK-V	1
1964–65	Antti Ravi	SaiPa	1
1965–66	Matti Reunamäki	TK-V	1
1966–67	Raimo Kilpiö	RU-38	2
1967–68	Lasse Oksanen	Ilves	1
1968–69	Seppo Nurmi	KooVee	1
1969–70	Pentti Vihanto	TuTo	1
1970–71	Matti Murto	HIFK	1
1971–72	Reijo Hakanen	Ilves	1
1972–73	Keijo Järvinen	Tappara	1
1973–74	Jorma Kallio	Ilves	1
1974–75	Jari Kapanen	Jokerit	1
1975–76	Jukka Alkula	Tappara	1
1976–77	Jarmo Koivunen	TPS	1
1977–78	Matti Rautiainen	KooVee	1
1978–79	Jukka Alkula	Tappara	2
1979–80	Jari Laiho	Lukko	1
1980–81	Timo Nummelin	TPS	1
1981–82	Henry Saleva	Kärpät	1
1982–83	Risto Jalo	Ilves	1
1983–84	Esa Keskinen	TPS	1
1984–85	Reijo Leppänen	TPS	1
1985–86	Erkki Lehtonen	Tappara	1
1986–87	Jukka Vilander	TPS	1
1987–88	Jukka Vilander	TPS	2
1988–89	Jukka Vilander	TPS	3
1989–90	Juha Järvenpää	Ilves	1
1990–91	Teemu Selänne	Jokerit	1
1991–92	Keijo Säilynoja	Jokerit	1
1992–93	Esa Keskinen	TPS	2
1993–94	Tero Lehterä	Kiekko-Espoo	1
1994–95	Risto Jalo	Ilves	2
1995–96	Jere Lehtinen	TPS	1
1996–97	Kimmo Rintanen	TPS	1
1997–98	Kimmo Rintanen	TPS	2
1998–99	Marko Kiprusoff	TPS	1
1999–00	Kimmo Rintanen	TPS	3
2000–01	Kimmo Rintanen	TPS	4
2001–02	Vesa Viitakoski	Ilves	1
2002–03	Ville Peltonen	Jokerit	1
2003–04	Kimmo Kuhta	HIFK	1
2004–05	Jani Rita	HPK	1
2005–06	Esa Pirnes	Espoo Blues	1
2006–07	Tommi Paakkolanvaara	Kärpät	1
2007–08	Janne Ojanen	Tappara	1
2008–09	Sami Kapanen	KalPa	1
2009–10	Mikael Granlund	HIFK	1
2010–11	Ville Peltonen	HIFK	2
2011–12	Ville Vahalahti	TPS	1
2012–13	Aki Uusikartano	Ässät	1
2013–14	Jan Latvala	Pelicans	1
2014–15	Arto Laatikainen	Kärpät	1
2015–16	Chad Rau	SaiPa	1
2016–17	Pekka Saravo	Tappara	1
2017–18	Jarkko Immonen	JYP	1
2018–19	Kristian Kuusela	Tappara	1
2019–20	Ville Koho	SaiPa	1
2020–21	Elmeri Eronen	HPK	1
2021–22	Mika Pyörälä	Kärpät	1
2022–23	Miika Roine	Pelicans	1
2023–24	Veli-Matti Vittasmäki	Tappara	1
2024–25	Marko Anttila	Kärpät	1
