= Hakanen =

Hakanen is a Finnish surname. Notable people with the surname include:

- Reijo Hakanen (born 1943), Finnish ice hockey player
- Ernest A. Hakanen (born 1958), social theorist
- Tapio Hakanen (born 1977), Finnish musician known by his stage name DJ Orkidea
