= Semir Ben-Amor =

Finnish ice hockey player

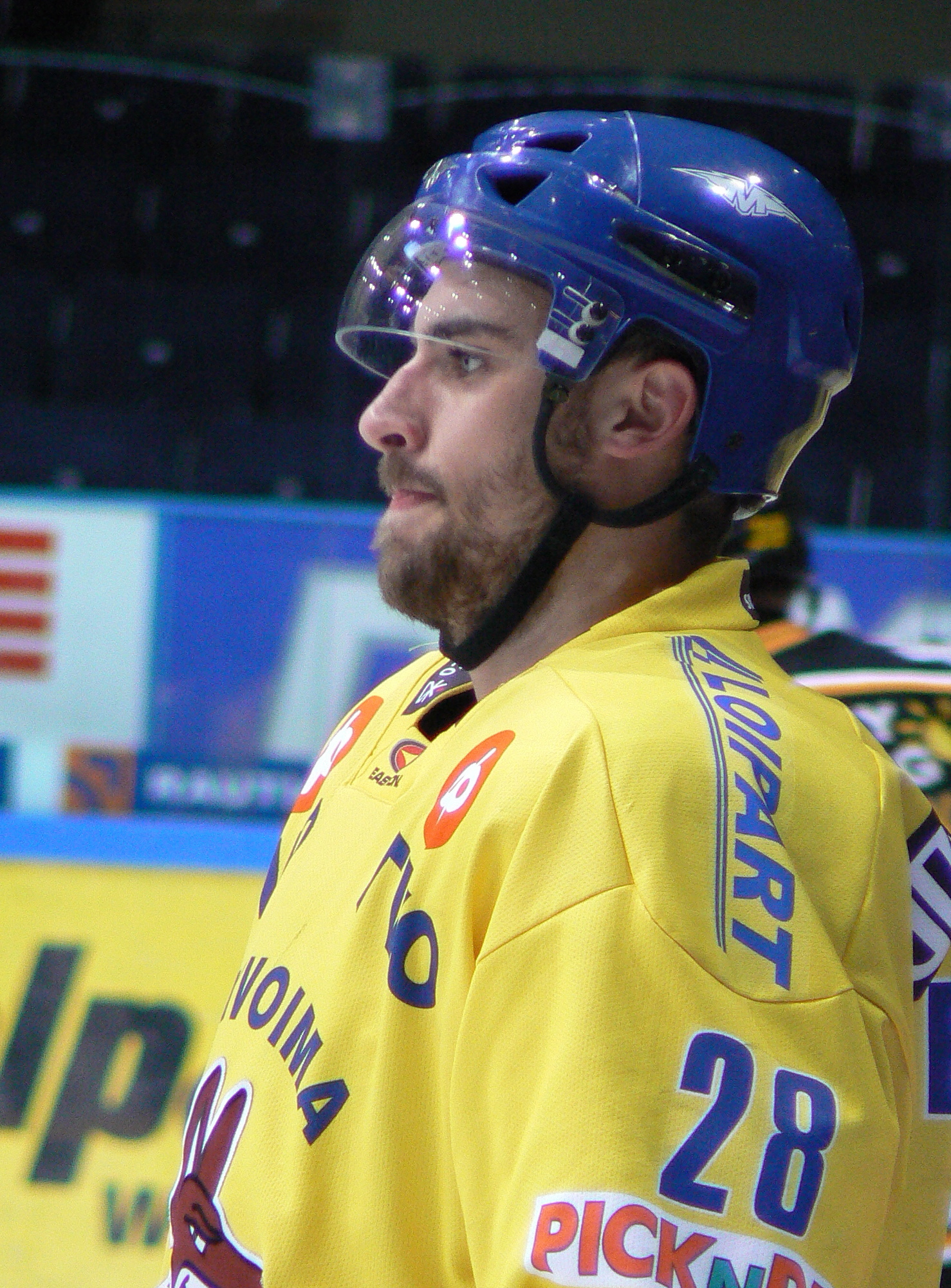
- Born: 6 May 1982 (age 44) Helsinki, Finland
- Height: 6 ft 0 in (183 cm)
- Weight: 223 lb (101 kg; 15 st 13 lb)
- Position: Forward
- Shot: left
- Played for: Blues; Lukko; Jokerit; Louisiana IceGators; Ässät
- NHL draft: Undrafted
- Playing career: 2000–2016

Semir Ben-Amor (born 6 May 1982) is a Finnish former professional ice hockey player who last played for Ässät of the SM-liiga.

Ben-Amor was born and raised in Tapiola, Espoo, Finland. He was born to a Finnish mother and a Tunisian father.

Ben-Amor was a key player in the 2012 notorious practice game between HIFK and Jokerit, where multiple long suspensions were given for violent and unsportsmanlike behavior to players as well as coaches from both teams. Ben-Amor was given the longest suspension of 18 games for checking Ville Peltonen from a blind spot in the middle of the ice, and then beating him while he was down and rendering him unconscious. Reportedly, someone from Jokerit's command told Ben-Amor to take him down, and the league gave the head and assisting coach both a suspension of eight games with clear signs of encouraging players to break the rules. Ben-Amor denies this, saying it was his own decision, but he regrets how it ultimately happened. In December 2012, he was fined €3,540 for assault. His 18-game suspension remains the third longest in the league's history, behind Ari Lähteenmäki's 27-game suspension in 1986 for cross-checking and violence, and Jere Karalahti's 22-game suspension in 1997 for the use of drugs.

== Career statistics ==
			Regular season					Playoffs
Season	Team	League	GP	G	A	Pts	PIM	GP	G	A	Pts	PIM
2000–01	Blues	SM-liiga	19	0	1	1	33	-	-	-	-	-
2001–02	Ässät	SM-liiga	41	2	1	3	62	-	-	-	-	-
2002–03	Louisiana IceGators	ECHL	61	3	13	16	113	6	1	1	2	6
2003–04	Blues	SM-liiga	10	0	1	1	2	-	-	-	-	-
2003–04	Salamat	Mestis	11	1	1	2	38	-	-	-	-	-
2003–04	Louisiana IceGators	ECHL	39	16	11	27	65	9	2	2	4	12
2004–05	Danbury Trashers	UHL	44	6	8	14	123	-	-	-	-	-
2005–06	Haukat	Mestis	2	0	1	1	4	-	-	-	-	-
2005–06	Salamat	Mestis	1	2	0	2	0	-	-	-	-	-
2005–06	Blues	SM-liiga	41	0	7	7	84	0	0	0	2	-
2006–07	Blues	SM-liiga	35	6	3	9	82	-	-	-	-	-
2007–08	Lukko	SM-liiga	48	3	5	8	162	3	0	0	0	0
2008–09	Lukko	SM-liiga	50	3	4	7	119	7	1	1	2	14
2009–10	Jokerit	SM-liiga	41	2	9	11	93	1	0	0	0	0
2010–11	Jokerit	SM-liiga	49	9	6	15	99	7	0	0	0	8
