= Stig Wetzell =

Finnish ice hockey player

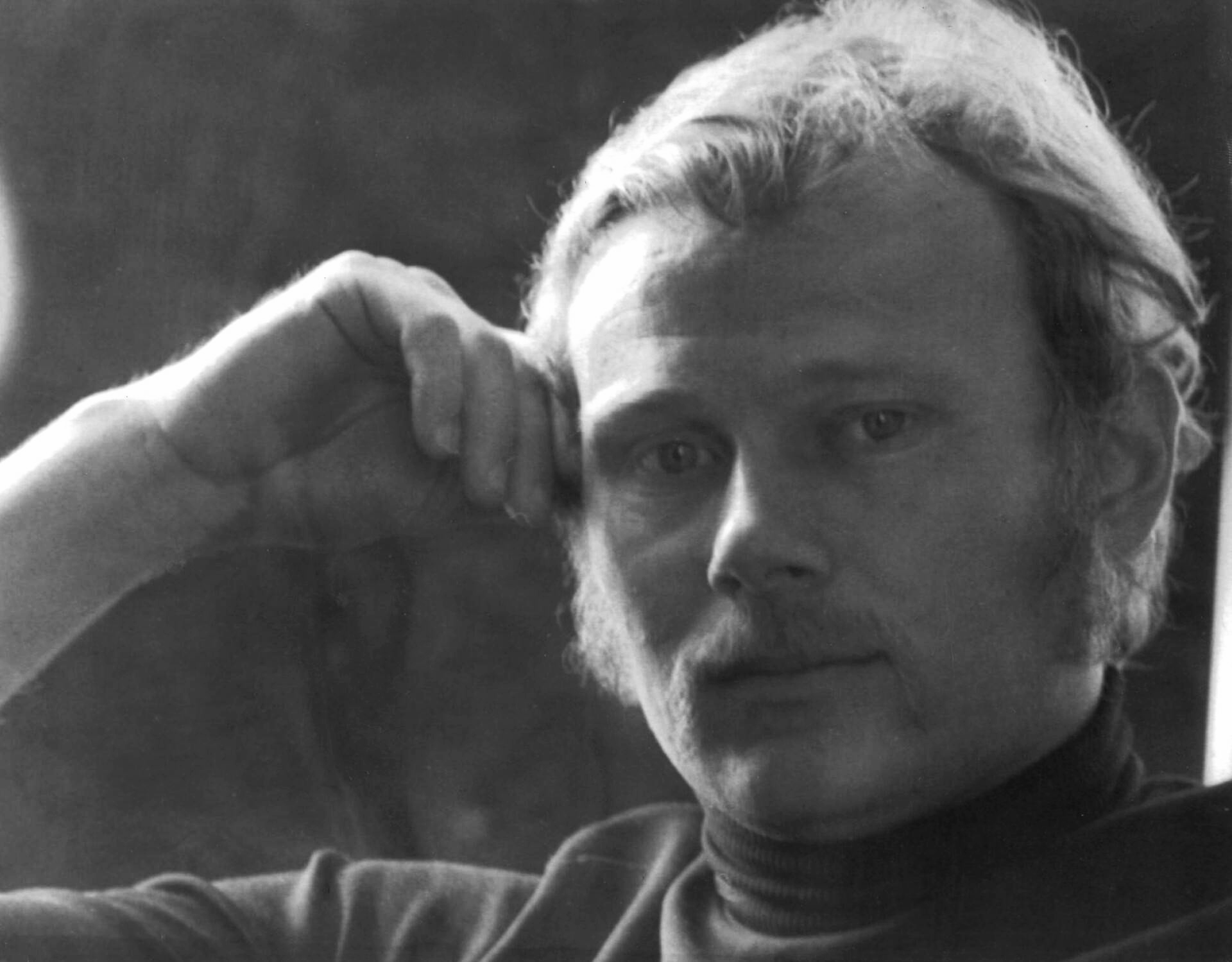
- Wetzell in 1972
- Born: October 7, 1945 (age 80) Vaasa, FIN
- Height: 5 ft 11 in (180 cm)
- Weight: 173 lb (78 kg; 12 st 5 lb)
- Position: Goaltender
- Caught: Left
- Played for: SM-liiga; UPa; HJK; HIFK
- National team: Finland
- Playing career: 1967–1983

Stig Wetzell (born October 7, 1945 in Vaasa, Finland) is a retired professional ice hockey player who played in the SM-liiga. He played for HJK and HIFK.

== Playing career ==
Stig Wetzell started his SM-liiga career in 1967. He played in SM-liiga for 16 years before retiring in 1983.

Wetzell won the SM-liiga Championship twice, in 1974 and 1983. On both occasions he played for HIFK, which was his team for most of his career.

== 1974 doping controversy ==
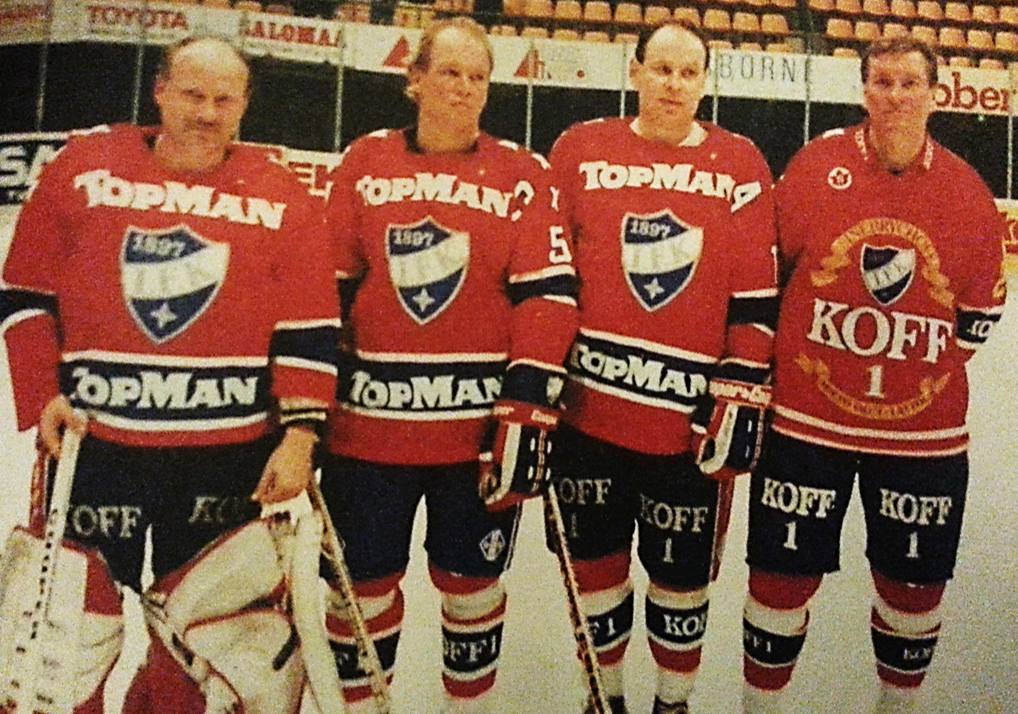
Stig Wetzell, Heikki Riihiranta, Matti Murto and Matti Hagman in 1992

Wetzell was caught doping during the 1974 Ice Hockey World Championship tournament in Finland. Testers found illegal amounts of Ephedrine in his urine sample.

Wetzell's positive A- and B-samples caused Finland's 5–2 win over Czechoslovakia to be reversed to a 5–0 loss to the Czechs. If Finland's 5-2 victory over Czechoslovakia had stood, Finland would have won bronze medals in the tournament.

Wetzell received an International Competition ban due to his doping in the 1974 Championship Tournament.

Later, Wetzell received an apology from the Finnish Ice Hockey Association, and he was inducted into the Finnish Hockey Hall of Fame in 2004.
