= Kimmo Kuhta =

Finnish ice hockey player

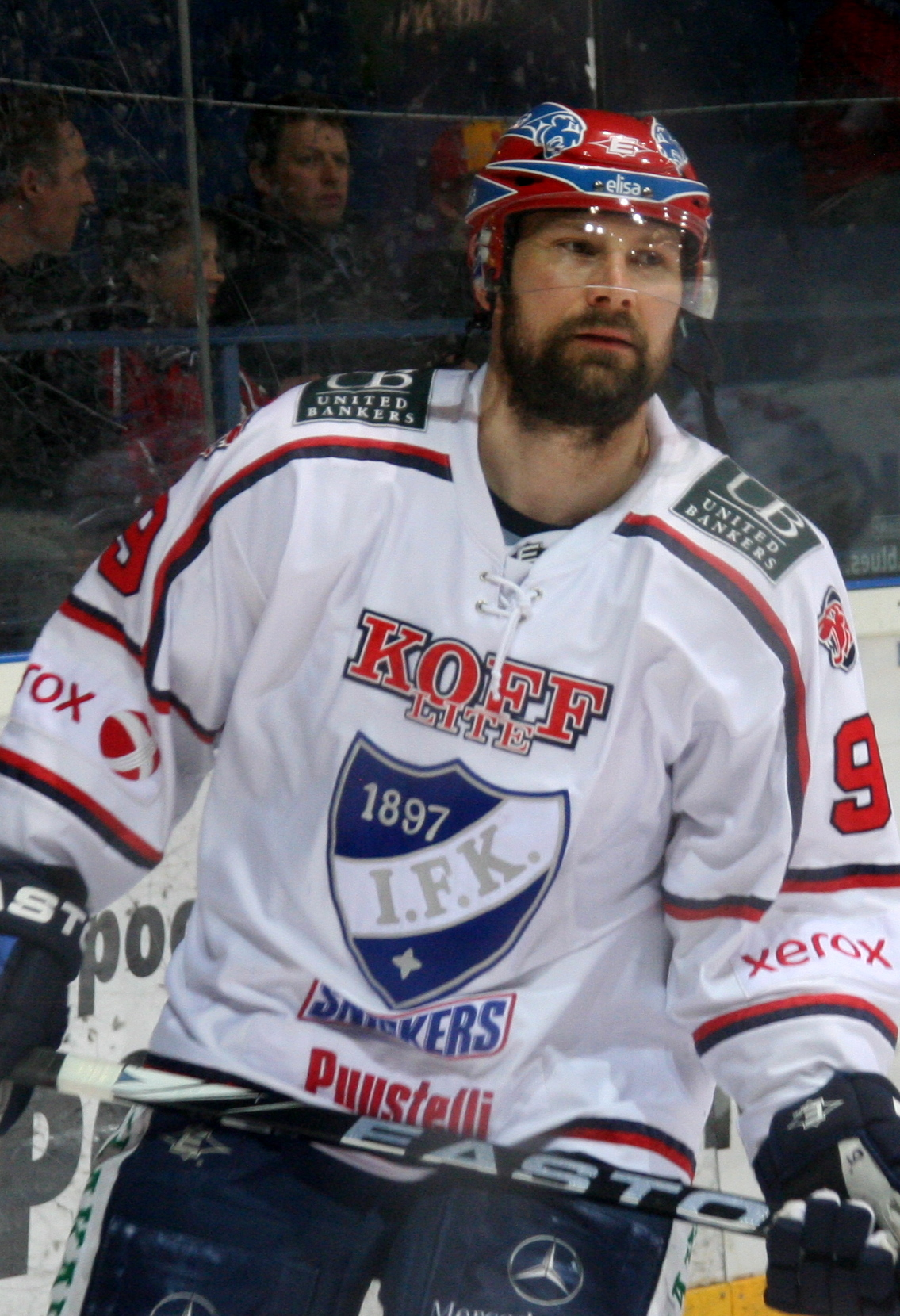
- Born: June 19, 1975 (age 49); Helsinki, Finland
- Height: 5 ft 11 in (180 cm)
- Weight: 187 lb (85 kg; 13 st 5 lb)
- Position: Right wing
- Shot: Left
- Played for: HIFK; Kiekko-Espoo; SC Bern; Hamburg Freezers
- NHL draft: Undrafted
- Playing career: 1995–2013

Kimmo Kuhta (born June 19, 1975) is a Finnish former professional ice hockey forward.

Apart from spending the 2005–06 season in the Swiss league, Kuhta represented HIFK in the SM-liiga from 1998 to the end of his career in 2013. He played a total of 728 games in HIFK, second only to Pertti Lehtonen with 851 on the team, and also holds the record for most goals in HIFK with 248 in total. For his long and successful career on the team, he is considered an iconic HIFK player and a favorite among fans. In October 2018, HIFK retired the number 9 in his honor before a match against Tappara.

After his playing career, he has worked as a hockey expert and a commentator for Yle, and coached junior teams for HIFK.

== Awards ==
- Raimo Kilpiö trophy for gentleman player - 2004

== Career statistics ==
| | | | Regular season | | | | | Playoffs |
| Season | Team | League | GP | G | A | Pts | PIM | GP | G | A | Pts | PIM |
|---|---|---|---|---|---|---|---|---|---|---|---|---|
| 1992–93 | Karhu-Kissat Jr. | Fin-Jr. B | 14 | 13 | 14 | 27 | 18 | — | — | — | — | — |
| 1992–93 | Karhu-Kissat Jr. | Fin-2 Jr. | 6 | 4 | 5 | 9 | 6 | — | — | — | — | — |
| 1993–94 | Karhu-Kissat Jr. | Fin-Jr. | — | — | — | — | — | — | — | — | — | — |
| 1994–95 | Karhu-Kissat Jr. | Fin-2 Jr. | 22 | 34 | 20 | 54 | 16 | — | — | — | — | — |
| 1995–96 | Kiekko-Espoo Jr. | Fin-Jr. | 36 | 30 | 16 | 46 | 10 | 4 | 1 | 1 | 2 | 0 |
| 1995–96 | Kiekko-Espoo | SM-l | 2 | 0 | 0 | 0 | 0 | — | — | — | — | — |
| 1996–97 | HIFK | SM-l | 38 | 1 | 1 | 2 | 6 | — | — | — | — | — |
| 1996–97 | PiTa | Fin-2 | 10 | 4 | 1 | 5 | 0 | — | — | — | — | — |
| 1997–98 | HIFK | SM-l | 23 | 1 | 1 | 2 | 2 | — | — | — | — | — |
| 1997–98 | Haukat | Fin-2 | 13 | 6 | 10 | 16 | 2 | — | — | — | — | — |
| 1998–99 | HIFK | SM-l | 45 | 12 | 10 | 22 | 45 | — | — | — | — | — |
| 1999–2000 | HIFK | SM-l | 47 | 15 | 9 | 24 | 14 | 8 | 0 | 0 | 0 | 0 |
| 2000–01 | HIFK | SM-l | 43 | 19 | 5 | 24 | 16 | 5 | 0 | 1 | 1 | 2 |
| 2001–02 | HIFK | SM-l | 51 | 10 | 13 | 23 | 14 | — | — | — | — | — |
| 2002–03 | HIFK | SM-l | 46 | 22 | 16 | 38 | 8 | 4 | 2 | 0 | 2 | 2 |
| 2003–04 | HIFK | SM-l | 56 | 31 | 28 | 59 | 18 | 13 | 8 | 1 | 9 | 2 |
| 2004–05 | HIFK | SM-l | 56 | 29 | 20 | 49 | 36 | 5 | 2 | 0 | 2 | 0 |
| 2005–06 | SC Bern | NLA | 42 | 16 | 21 | 37 | 16 | 6 | 2 | 4 | 6 | 2 |
| 2006–07 | HIFK | SM-l | 55 | 24 | 26 | 50 | 32 | 5 | 0 | 1 | 1 | 2 |
| 2007–08 | HIFK | SM-l | 56 | 20 | 18 | 38 | 36 | 7 | 1 | 2 | 3 | 6 |
| 2008–09 | HIFK | SM-l | 34 | 13 | 12 | 25 | 28 | 2 | 0 | 0 | 0 | 0 |
| 2009–10 | Hamburg Freezers | DEL | 32 | 14 | 5 | 19 | 35 | — | — | — | — | — |
| 2009–10 | HIFK | SM-l | 18 | 8 | 6 | 14 | 6 | 5 | 0 | 4 | 4 | 4 |
| 2010–11 | HIFK | SM-l | 59 | 24 | 27 | 51 | 20 | 16 | 5 | 7 | 12 | 10 |
| 2011–12 | HIFK | SM-l | 50 | 14 | 26 | 40 | 26 | 4 | 0 | 1 | 1 | 0 |
| 2012–13 | HIFK | SM-l | 51 | 6 | 13 | 19 | 22 | 7 | 2 | 3 | 5 | 0 |
| SM-l totals | | | 730 | 249 | 231 | 480 | 329 | 81 | 20 | 20 | 40 | 28 |

| Preceded by Ville Peltonen | Winner of the Raimo Kilpiö trophy 2003-04 | Succeeded by Jani Rita |
