= Jani Rita =

Finnish ice hockey player (born 1981)

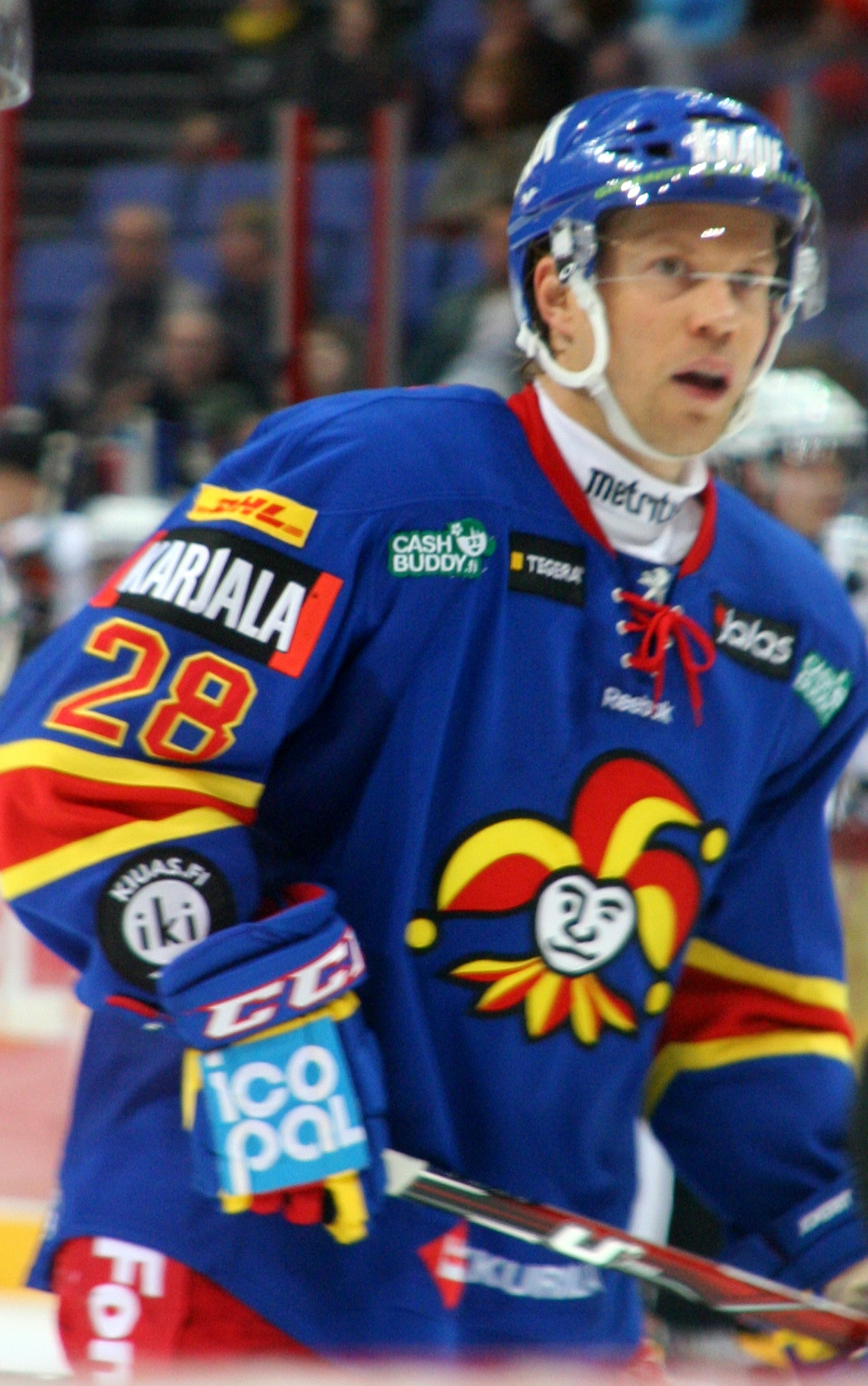
- Rita with Jokerit in 2011
- Born: July 25, 1981 (age 44) Helsinki, Finland
- Height: 6 ft 1 in (185 cm)
- Weight: 209 lb (95 kg; 14 st 13 lb)
- Position: Left wing
- Shot: Left
- Played for: Jokerit; Edmonton Oilers; HPK; Pittsburgh Penguins
- National team: Finland
- NHL draft: 13th overall, 1999; Edmonton Oilers
- Playing career: 1998–2016

Jani Markus Rita (born July 25, 1981) is a Finnish former professional ice hockey winger who last played with Jokerit of the Russian KHL, for whom he played most of his career.

== Playing career ==
Despite limited NHL experience, Rita has played extensively in the American Hockey League and in the SM-liiga in his native Finland. Rita started his hockey career in a youth team of EKS (Espoon Kiekkoseura). He played his first seasons of pro hockey for Jokerit, Helsinki, and was drafted 13th overall in the 1999 NHL entry draft by the Edmonton Oilers.

Rita played for HPK in the SM-liiga during the 2004–05 NHL lockout, winning the bronze medal. That season he was awarded the Raimo Kilpiö trophy, and led the league in scoring during the playoffs. He also represented Finland at the 2005 World Hockey Championship, earning one assist. He had signed with Jokerit for the 2005–06 season with a contractual clause enabling him to return to the NHL. When the Oilers offered him a one-year contract in August 2005, Rita signed on to return to North America.

Although once considered a premier prospect at the NHL level, Rita's slow development showed cause for concern to Oilers management. On January 26, 2006, Rita was traded along with Cory Cross, to the Pittsburgh Penguins for Dick Tärnström. He finished the season with just 10 points in 51 games.

It was announced on 2 May 2006 that Rita was to depart Pittsburgh to return to his original club, Jokerit. He was the best goal scorer of SM-liiga in 2006–07 season. After ten more years with Jokerit including the club's transition from the Finnish Liiga to the KHL in 2014, Rita announced his retirement in June 2016.

== Career statistics ==
=== Regular season and playoffs ===
			Regular season					Playoffs
Season	Team	League	GP	G	A	Pts	PIM	GP	G	A	Pts	PIM
1997–98	Jokerit	FIN U18	7	7	4	11	2	—	—	—	—	—
1997–98	Jokerit	FIN U20	36	15	9	24	2	8	4	1	5	0
1998–99	Jokerit	FIN U20	20	9	13	22	8	6	1	1	2	8
1998–99	Jokerit	SM-l	41	3	2	5	39	—	—	—	—	—
1999–2000	Jokerit	FIN U20	1	1	0	1	0	—	—	—	—	—
1999–2000	Jokerit	SM-l	49	6	3	9	10	11	1	0	1	0
2000–01	Jokerit	FIN U20	3	3	2	5	0	—	—	—	—	—
2000–01	Jokerit	SM-l	50	5	10	15	18	5	0	0	0	2
2001–02	Edmonton Oilers	NHL	1	0	0	0	0	—	—	—	—	—
2001–02	Hamilton Bulldogs	AHL	76	25	17	42	32	15	8	4	12	0
2002–03	Edmonton Oilers	NHL	12	3	1	4	0	—	—	—	—	—
2002–03	Hamilton Bulldogs	AHL	64	21	27	48	18	23	3	4	7	2
2003–04	Edmonton Oilers	NHL	2	0	0	0	0	—	—	—	—	—
2003–04	Toronto Roadrunners	AHL	64	17	24	41	18	1	1	0	1	0
2004–05	HPK	SM-l	56	21	18	39	12	10	7	4	11	4
2005–06	Edmonton Oilers	NHL	21	3	0	3	6	—	—	—	—	—
2005–06	Pittsburgh Penguins	NHL	30	3	4	7	4	—	—	—	—	—
2006–07	Jokerit	SM-l	56	32	20	52	28	10	6	1	7	2
2007–08	Jokerit	SM-l	37	10	10	20	16	14	6	4	10	0
2008–09	Jokerit	SM-l	58	15	16	31	12	5	0	2	2	0
2009–10	Jokerit	SM-l	58	13	15	28	26	3	0	2	2	27
2010–11	Jokerit	SM-l	8	2	0	2	2	7	0	1	1	2
2011–12	Jokerit	SM-l	60	17	14	31	20	10	0	2	2	4
2012–13	Jokerit	SM-l	50	11	5	16	6	6	1	1	2	2
2013–14	Jokerit	Liiga	60	11	10	21	6	2	1	0	1	2
2014–15	Jokerit	KHL	34	3	2	5	8	4	0	0	0	2
2015–16	Jokerit	KHL	56	3	5	8	28	3	0	0	0	2
SM-l/Liiga totals			583	146	123	269	195	83	22	17	39	45
NHL totals			66	9	5	14	10	—	—	—	—	—
AHL totals			204	63	68	131	68	39	12	8	20	2

=== International ===
Year	Team	Event	GP	G	A	Pts	PIM
1998	Finland	EJC	6	2	3	5	6
1999	Finland	WJC	6	1	1	2	2
2000	Finland	WJC	7	0	3	3	0
2001	Finland	WJC	7	8	1	9	0
2005	Finland	WC	7	0	2	2	6
2006	Finland	WC	6	1	0	1	0
Junior totals			26	11	8	19	8
Senior totals			13	1	2	3	6

== Awards ==
- Raimo Kilpiö trophy for gentleman player - 2005
- Aarne Honkavaara trophy for best goal scorer - 2007

Preceded by Michael Henrich	Edmonton Oilers first-round draft pick 1999	Succeeded by Alexei Mikhnov
Preceded by Kimmo Kuhta	Winner of the Raimo Kilpiö trophy 2004–05	Succeeded by Esa Pirnes
Preceded by Tony Salmelainen	Winner of the Aarne Honkavaara trophy 2006–07	Succeeded by Janne Pesonen
