= Ville Peltonen =

Finnish ice hockey player

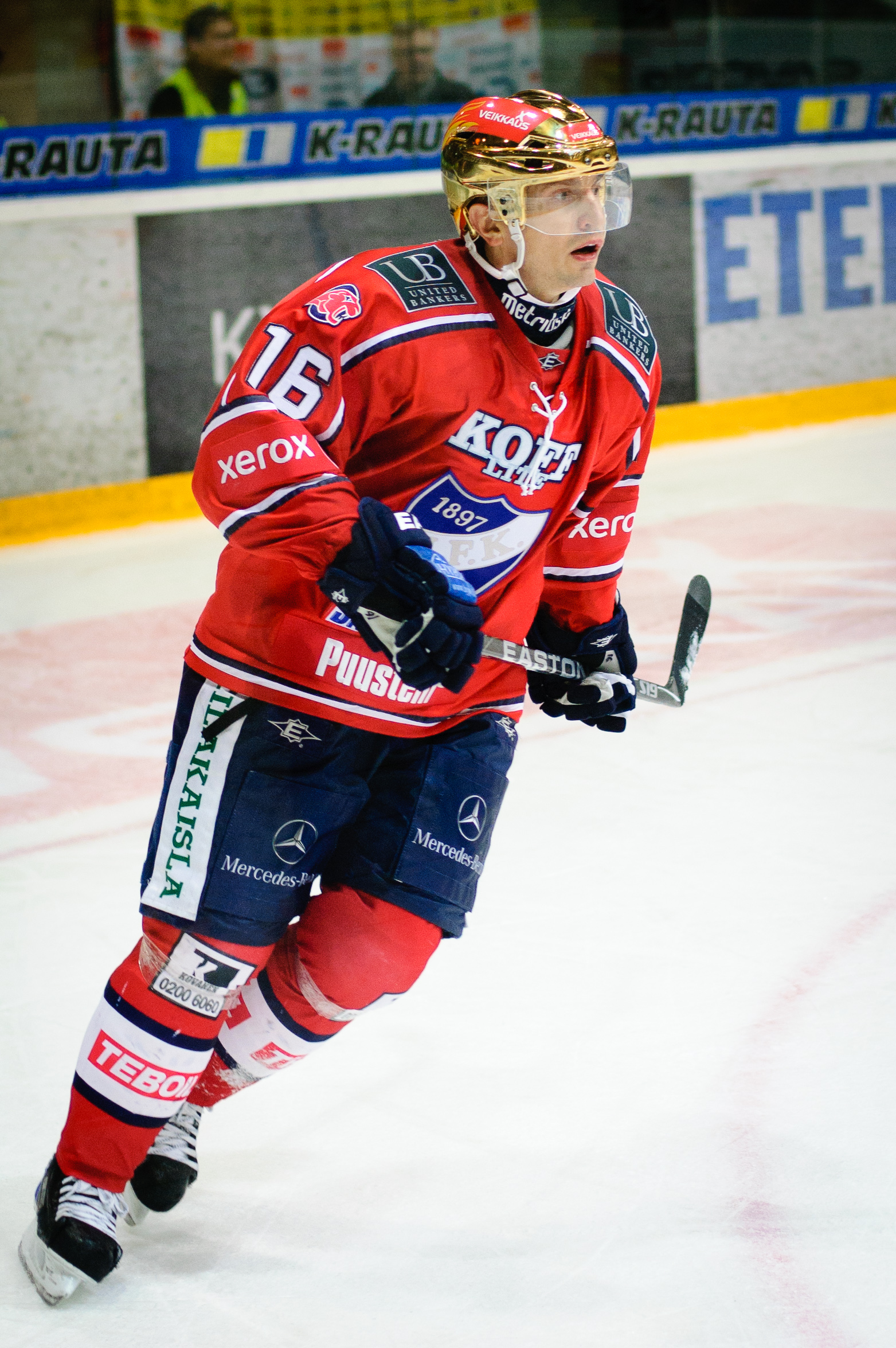
- Ville Peltonen with HIFK in October 2010
- Born: 24 May 1973 (age 53) Vantaa, Finland
- Height: 5 ft 10 in (178 cm)
- Weight: 182 lb (83 kg; 13 st 0 lb)
- Position: Left wing
- Shot: Left
- Played for: NHL; San Jose Sharks; Nashville Predators; Florida Panthers; SM-liiga; Jokerit; HIFK; Elitserien; Frölunda HC; Nationalliga A HC Lugano; KHL; HC Dynamo Minsk
- National team: Finland
- NHL draft: 58th overall, 1993; San Jose Sharks
- Playing career: 1991–2014

Ville Sakari Peltonen (born 24 May 1973) is a Finnish ice hockey coach and a former professional ice hockey forward. Peltonen was drafted by the San Jose Sharks as their third-round pick, 58th overall, in the 1993 NHL entry draft. During his professional career, he has played 382 NHL games for Sharks, Nashville Predators and Florida Panthers. Internationally, he represented the Finland men's national ice hockey team, and was inducted into the IIHF Hall of Fame in 2016.

== Playing career ==
Peltonen started playing hockey with Etelä-Vantaan Urheilijat (EVU), and moved to HIFK when he was ten years old. He debuted the Finnish SM-liiga in 1991–92 SM-liiga season, playing six games in regular season. The following year, Peltonen scored 13 goals and 37 points in 46 games with HIFK winning the Jarmo Wasama memorial trophy as the best rookie of the season. The NHL franchise San Jose Sharks drafted Peltonen as their third-round pick, 58th overall in the 1993 NHL entry draft. Peltonen decided to stay with HIFK for two more seasons before heading to the NHL.

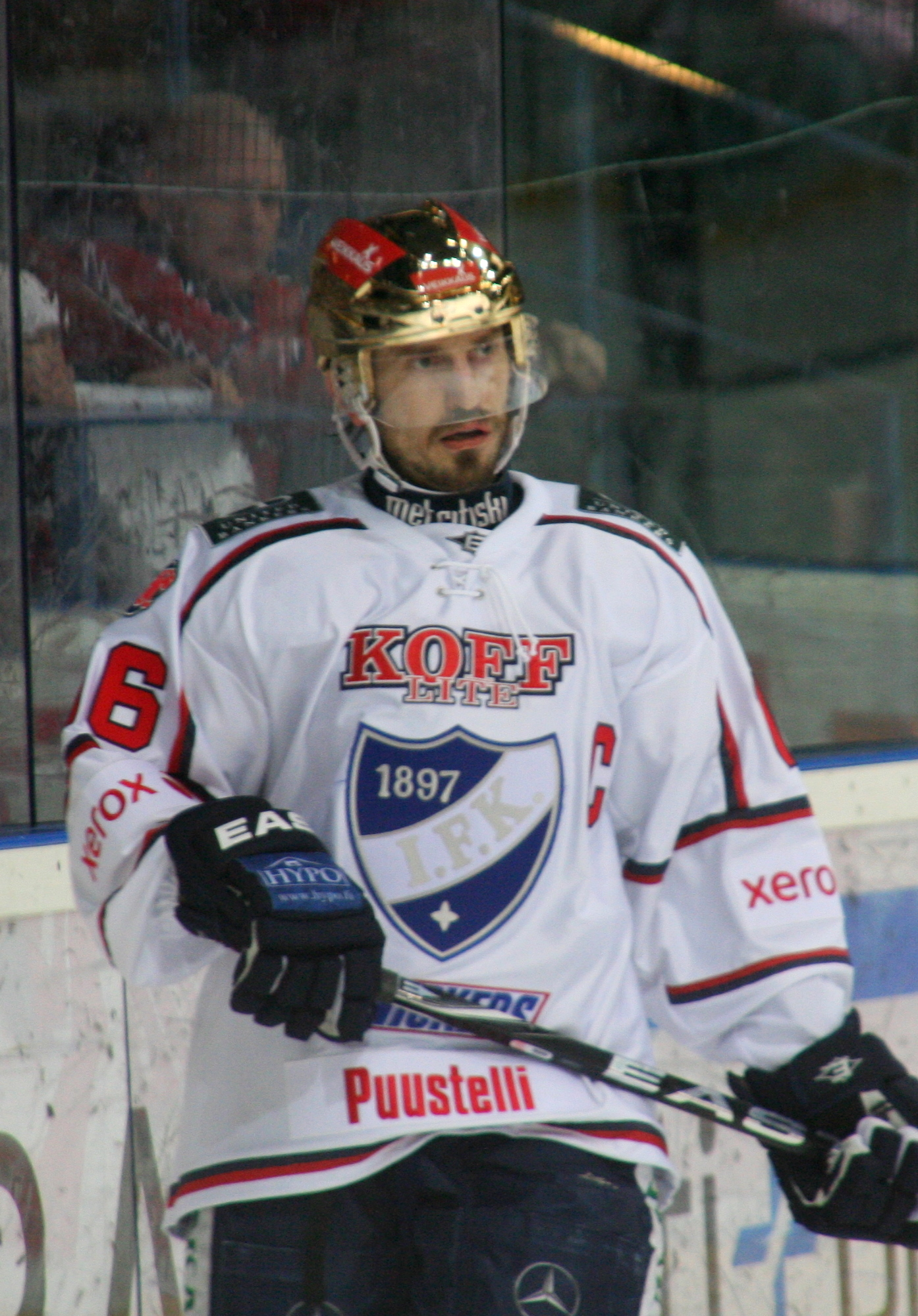
Peltonen with his 5th pro team HIFK, wearing the golden helmet as the leading scorer of his team in 2011.

In his rookie season in the NHL, Peltonen played 31 games with Sharks, scoring 13 points. He scored his first career NHL goal on 26 February 1996 against the Montreal Canadiens into an empty net in a Sharks 7–4 victory, San Jose's first ever over Montreal. He also played 29 regular season games for Sharks' IHL affiliate Kansas City Blades, scoring 18 points. However, San Jose did not make the playoffs. The next season Peltonen scored only five points in 28 NHL games, but with the Kentucky Thoroughblades he scored 22 goals and 52 points in 40 games. After two years in the NHL, Peltonen returned to Europe to play for Västra Frölunda HC of Swedish Elitserien. He was the best pointman of the league, scoring 51 points in 49 games. After a successful season with Frölunda, Peltonen returned to NHL to play for Nashville Predators. However, his returning season was short lived, when he injured after 14 games. Before the injury, Peltonen had scored 10 points with the team. He stayed with the Predators for two more seasons, but in 2000-2001 NHL season he played mostly for Milwaukee Admirals, and was chosen to AHL's All Star Game.

After the years in Nashville, Peltonen returned to SM-liiga, signing a two-year contract with Jokerit, a local competitor of Peltonen's former SM-liiga team HIFK. He was chosen as the captain of the team, but was injured and played only 30 games of the regular season scoring 29 points. However, Jokerit and Peltonen won the Kanada-malja championship. He continued with Jokerit in 2002–03 SM-liiga season, scoring 42 points in 49 games. He won the Raimo Kilpiö trophy as league's "gentleman player", and was chosen to the league's All-Star lineup.

After a two-season stint with Jokerit, Peltonen headed to Switzerland's National League A to play for HC Lugano, where he played three outstanding seasons. In his first season with the team, he scored career-high 28 goals, 44 assists and 72 points in only 48 games, winning the title of league's best pointman. The following season Peltonen scored 56 points. In his last season with the team, he was named the captain of the team. Peltonen led the playoffs in goal scoring, and also scored the game-winning goal winning the championship of the league. The great three seasons with Lugano gave Peltonen an opportunity to return to NHL, this time for Florida Panthers. In his first season with Florida, he scored 37 points in 72 games of regular season. The following season was disturbed by a leg injury, which caused Peltonen to miss 24 games. Peltonen stayed with the Panthers for one more season, but then moved to Kontinental Hockey League to play for HC Dinamo Minsk, where he was once again the captain of his team. However, Peltonen only scored 26 points in 51 games for the team in regular season.

After only one season in KHL Peltonen returned for his old franchise HIFK with a two-year contract in 2010, and was named as team's captain. Peltonen scored 28 goals and 65 points, and finished second in points of the whole league after Perttu Lindgren of Lukko, who scored 66 points. Peltonen was chosen as the best player of the regular season winning the Lasse Oksanen trophy. He was also awarded with the Raimo Kilpiö trophy for second time during his career, and for the first time he also won the Kultainen kypärä (The Golden Helmet), being awarded as the best player by league's other players. Peltonen was chosen to the All-Star lineup and HIFK won the Kanada-malja championship for first time since 1998 as Peltonen, Mikael Granlund and Juha-Pekka Haataja led the team to the championship.

In the 2011-12 SM-liiga season, Peltonen played 49 regular season games scoring 24 goals and 48 points, finishing as the ninth player of the league in points. After another great season, 38-year-old forward decided to continue his career with the IFK. In a practice game in September 2012, Peltonen was assaulted by Semir Ben-Amor that injured him for some time, and deteriorated the relationship between him and some players from Ben-Amor's team that he had befriended. In March 2014, Peltonen officially announced his retirement as a player. He played his last game as his club HIFK was eliminated from the playoffs.

== International play ==
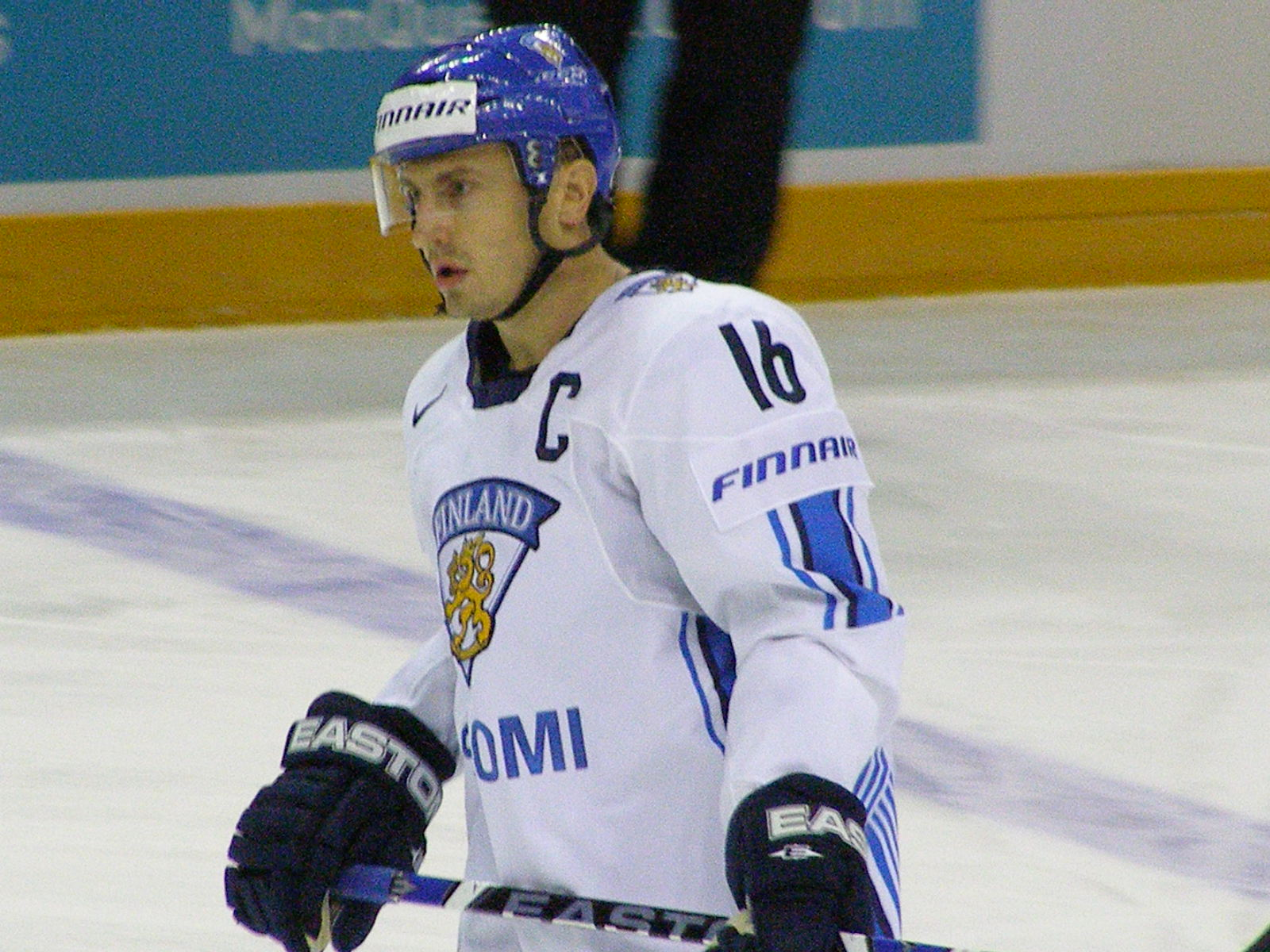
- Peltonen at the 2008 IIHF World Championship

Medal record

Men's Ice hockey

Representing Finland

Olympic Games
Silver medal – second place	2006 Turin	
Bronze medal – third place	1994 Lillehammer	
Bronze medal – third place	1998 Nagano	
Bronze medal – third place	2010 Vancouver	

World Cup
Silver medal – second place	2004 Toronto	

World Championships
Gold medal – first place	1995 Sweden	
Silver medal – second place	1994 Italy	
Silver medal – second place	1998 Switzerland	
Silver medal – second place	1999 Norway	
Silver medal – second place	2007 Russia	
Bronze medal – third place	2000 Russia	
Bronze medal – third place	2006 Latvia	
Bronze medal – third place	2008 Canada	

IIHF European Junior Championships
Bronze medal – third place	1991 Czechoslovakia	

Peltonen has represented Finland in international play on several occasions since the 1994 Winter Olympics. After this, Finland has played 25 international tournaments, with Peltonen playing in the team for 19 times, being tied with Finnish hockey legend Raimo Helminen. He has also played as the captain of his team in IIHF World Championships for six times. Peltonen is by far the most successful Finnish hockey player with 13 medals from his 19 tournaments. The next-best individual medal record is nine.

Peltonen debuted the national team in November 1993 in a game against Czech Republic. He was chosen to the Finnish olympic team to play for 1994 Winter Olympics held in Lillehammer. He played on the same line with Jere Lehtinen and Saku Koivu, and they formed team's best line of the tournament. The Finns achieved a bronze medal and Peltonen, who scored 7 points in 8 games, was also chosen to the 1994 World Championships, where the team gained a silver medal after a 3–2 loss to Canada in a shootout competition. However, the following year Peltonen established his place in the history of Finnish hockey; Peltonen scored a hat trick in the final game against Sweden, leading his team to 4–1 victory and taking their first World Championship victory. Peltonen once again formed a great line with Lehtinen and Koivu, and all three were named tournament All-Stars line.

In the 1998 Winter Olympics Peltonen was replaced with Finnish NHL-star Teemu Selänne on the first line of Finland. However, Selänne was injured before the bronze medal game, and Peltonen once again showed his skills with Koivu and Lehtinen, scoring the game-winning goal against Canada. The same year in the World Championships, Peltonen tied the game against Canada in second consolation round only ten seconds before the end of the game. The Finns once again played in the finals, but were defeated by Sweden.

== Coaching career ==
After retiring in 2014, Peltonen immediately started his coaching career in the youth ranks of his hometown club HIFK, serving as head coach of the club's under-20 team. He was also named assistant coach of Finland's national team, serving under Kari Jalonen at the 2015 and 2016 World Championships and during the 2014–15 and 2015-16 Euro Hockey Tour.

In April 2016, Peltonen signed with SC Bern of Switzerland, where he served as assistant coach, again under Jalonen. He helped Bern capture the 2017 Swiss national championship. Peltonen left the club at the conclusion of the 2017-18 campaign and took over the head coaching job at Lausanne HC. In the 2018–19 season, he guided Lausanne to a semifinal appearance in the Swiss league. He was fired at the end of February 2020. In 2021, he served as assistant coach of Germany's national team at the Deutschland Cup and the World Championship, working under his countryman, head coach Toni Söderholm. Later that month, he signed a three-year contract with his home team HIFK as the head coach. In 2023, the contract was extended until 2026. In 2025, after a disappointing playoff run and fans' demands, he was fired as HIFK's head coach and his contract was terminated. Peltonen's replacement is Olli Jokinen.

== Personal life ==
Peltonen married a Finnish figure skater, Hanna. They have four children – twin sons Alex and Jesper (born c. 1997), Emmi Peltonen (Finnish figure skater born in November 1999), and Nelli (born c. 2005).

== Career statistics ==
=== Regular season and playoffs ===
			Regular season					Playoffs
Season	Team	League	GP	G	A	Pts	PIM	GP	G	A	Pts	PIM
1990–91	HIFK	FIN U20	36	21	16	37	16	7	2	3	5	10
1991–92	HIFK	FIN U20	37	28	23	51	28	4	0	2	2	2
1991–92	HIFK	SM-l	6	0	0	0	0	—	—	—	—	—
1992–93	HIFK	FIN U20	2	4	2	6	4	—	—	—	—	—
1992–93	HIFK	SM-l	46	13	24	37	16	4	0	2	2	2
1993–94	HIFK	SM-l	43	16	22	38	14	3	0	0	0	2
1994–95	HIFK	SM-l	45	20	16	36	16	3	0	0	0	0
1995–96	San Jose Sharks	NHL	31	2	11	13	14	—	—	—	—	—
1995–96	Kansas City Blades	IHL	29	5	13	18	8	—	—	—	—	—
1996–97	San Jose Sharks	NHL	28	2	3	5	0	—	—	—	—	—
1996–97	Kentucky Thoroughblades	AHL	40	22	30	52	21	—	—	—	—	—
1997–98	Västra Frölunda HC	SEL	45	22	29	51	44	7	4	2	6	0
1998–99	Nashville Predators	NHL	14	5	5	10	2	—	—	—	—	—
1999–2000	Nashville Predators	NHL	79	6	22	28	22	—	—	—	—	—
2000–01	Nashville Predators	NHL	23	3	1	4	2	—	—	—	—	—
2000–01	Milwaukee Admirals	IHL	53	27	33	60	26	5	2	1	3	6
2001–02	Jokerit	SM-l	30	11	18	29	8	—	—	—	—	—
2002–03	Jokerit	SM-l	49	23	19	42	14	10	4	6	10	0
2003–04	HC Lugano	NLA	48	28	44	72	16	16	4	10	14	8
2004–05	HC Lugano	NLA	44	24	32	56	16	5	0	3	3	2
2005–06	HC Lugano	NLA	39	23	25	48	22	17	12	14	26	8
2006–07	Florida Panthers	NHL	72	17	20	37	28	—	—	—	—	—
2007–08	Florida Panthers	NHL	56	5	15	20	20	—	—	—	—	—
2008–09	Florida Panthers	NHL	79	12	19	31	31	—	—	—	—	—
2009–10	Dinamo Minsk	KHL	51	6	20	26	54	—	—	—	—	—
2010–11	HIFK	SM-l	54	28	37	65	16	16	6	6	12	6
2011–12	HIFK	SM-l	49	24	24	48	36	4	0	1	1	0
2012–13	HIFK	SM-l	43	13	16	29	40	—	—	—	—	—
2013–14	HIFK	SM-l	55	13	29	42	16	2	0	1	1	0
SM-l totals			420	161	205	366	176	42	10	16	26	10
NHL totals			382	52	96	148	119	—	—	—	—	—
NLA totals			131	75	101	176	54	38	16	27	43	18

=== International ===
Year	Team	Event	GP	G	A	Pts	PIM
1991	Finland	EJC	6	4	4	8	2
1993	Finland	WJC	7	5	6	11	20
1994	Finland	OG	8	4	3	7	0
1994	Finland	WC	8	4	1	5	4
1995	Finland	WC	8	6	5	11	4
1996	Finland	WCH	4	1	3	4	0
1996	Finland	WC	6	3	2	5	6
1997	Finland	WC	7	2	2	4	0
1998	Finland	OG	6	2	1	3	6
1998	Finland	WC	10	4	6	10	8
1999	Finland	WC	12	2	3	5	2
2000	Finland	WC	9	0	4	4	2
2003	Finland	WC	7	3	4	7	2
2004	Finland	WCH	6	1	2	3	2
2004	Finland	WC	7	4	6	10	2
2005	Finland	WC	6	1	2	3	4
2006	Finland	OG	8	4	5	9	6
2006	Finland	WC	9	2	2	4	8
2007	Finland	WC	9	2	7	9	4
2008	Finland	WC	9	1	3	4	2
2010	Finland	OG	6	0	1	1	2
Junior totals			13	9	10	19	22
Senior totals			145	46	62	108	64

== Awards ==
=== SM-liiga ===
- Kanada-malja championship (2002, 2011)
- Jarmo Wasama memorial trophy (Best rookie of the league, 1993)
- Raimo Kilpiö trophy (The gentleman player of the league, 2003, 2011)
- Lasse Oksanen trophy (Best player of the regular season, 2011)
- Kultainen kypärä (The best player of the league voted by others, 2011)
- President's Trophy (Person who has influenced ice hockey for the most, 2005)
- Was chosen to the SM-liiga All-Star line (2003, 2011)

=== Other awards ===
- Finnish Jr. A League Runners-up (1990–91)
- Ice Hockey World Championships Tournament All-Star (1995, 1998, 2004)
- NLA-league Championship (2006)
- Leading scorer Swedish Elitserien (1998)
- Leading scorer Swiss NLA-league (2004)
- The Most Valuable Player of the national team (2005)
- Spengler Cup Winner (2009)
- Inducted into the IIHF Hall of Fame in 2016

Awards and achievements
Preceded by Petri Varis	Winner of the Jarmo Wasama memorial trophy 1992–93	Succeeded by Juha Lind
Preceded by Vesa Viitakoski	Winner of the Raimo Kilpiö trophy 2002–03	Succeeded by Kimmo Kuhta
Preceded by Päivi Halonen	Winner of the President's Trophy; 2004–05	Succeeded by Erkka Westerlund
Olympic Games
Preceded by Janne Lahtela	Flagbearer for Finland; Vancouver 2010	Succeeded by Enni Rukajärvi
