= Reijo Hakanen =

Finnish ice hockey player

- Born: August 20, 1943 (age 81); Kangasala, Finland
- Height: 5 ft 4 in (163 cm)
- Weight: 134 lb (61 kg; 9 st 8 lb)
- Position: Forward
- Shot: Right
- Played for: SM-liiga; Ilves; 1. Divisioona; FPS; KooKoo
- Playing career: 1961–1978

Reijo Hakanen (born August 20, 1943) is a retired professional ice hockey player who played in the SM-liiga for Ilves. He was born in Kangasala, Finland and inducted into the Finnish Hockey Hall of Fame in 1988.

Hakanen was known for his small size and clean style of play; he never received more than 10 minutes in penalties during a season. He was selected as the Gentlemanary Player of SM-liiga in 1972 and received the Raimo Kilpiö trophy.

Preceded by Matti Murto	Winner of the Raimo Kilpiö trophy 1971-72	Succeeded by Keijo Järvinen
