= Keijo Säilynoja =

Finnish ice hockey player

- Born: February 17, 1970 (age 55); Vantaa, FIN
- Height: 6 ft 2 in (188 cm)
- Weight: 196 lb (89 kg; 14 st 0 lb)
- Position: Right wing
- Shot: Left
- Played for: SM-liiga; Jokerit; SaiPa; Blues
- National team: Finland
- NHL draft: 122nd overall, 1990; Edmonton Oilers
- Playing career: 1988–2001

Keijo Henrik Säilynoja (born February 17, 1970, in Vantaa, Finland) is a retired Finnish ice hockey player

== Playing career ==
=== Jokerit (1988-1998) ===
Säilynoja started his career for Jokerit in 1988, while the team was playing in Finnish First Division. Jokerit were promoted to SM-liiga in 1989 and Säilynoja had made himself as one of the solid players in Jokerit lineup.

Säilynoja had a reputation for being good at Penalty Shots

Säilynoja played in Jokerit for 10 seasons and won the Finnish Championship four times and finished second once.

=== SaiPa (1998-2000) ===
After his 10 years for Jokerit, Säilynoja moved to Lappeenranta and played two seasons for SaiPa.

=== Espoo Blues (2000-2001) ===
Säliynoja's final SM-liiga season was with Espoo Blues and he retired from active play in 2001.

=== After retirement ===
After his retirement, Säilynoja started working out on Banking business and served as the chairman for Finnish ice hockey Players Association.

In 2008, Säilynoja was named as the General Manager for Jokerit

== International career ==
Keijo Säilynoja
Medal record

Representing Finland

Men's ice hockey

World Championships
| Silver medal – second place | 1992 Czechoslovakia | Ice hockey |

Säilynoja played 46 games for Finnish national team.

Säilynoja was part of the 1992 World Championship squad which won Silver.

== Career statistics ==
=== Regular season and playoffs ===
| | | | Regular season | | | | | Playoffs |
| Season | Team | League | GP | G | A | Pts | PIM | GP | G | A | Pts | PIM |
|---|---|---|---|---|---|---|---|---|---|---|---|---|
| 1986–87 | Jokerit | FIN U20 | 27 | 9 | 7 | 16 | 6 | — | — | — | — | — |
| 1987–88 | Jokerit | FIN U20 | 33 | 23 | 27 | 50 | 4 | — | — | — | — | — |
| 1988–89 | Jokerit | FIN U20 | 4 | 10 | 5 | 15 | 0 | — | — | — | — | — |
| 1988–89 | Jokerit | FIN.2 | 34 | 21 | 19 | 40 | 8 | — | — | — | — | — |
| 1989–90 | Jokerit | SM-l | 41 | 15 | 13 | 28 | 14 | — | — | — | — | — |
| 1990–91 | Jokerit | FIN U20 | 1 | 0 | 0 | 0 | 0 | — | — | — | — | — |
| 1990–91 | Jokerit | SM-l | 44 | 21 | 25 | 46 | 14 | — | — | — | — | — |
| 1991–92 | Jokerit | SM-l | 42 | 21 | 25 | 46 | 14 | 10 | 5 | 6 | 11 | 2 |
| 1992–93 | Jokerit | SM-l | 47 | 29 | 13 | 42 | 14 | 3 | 1 | 1 | 2 | 0 |
| 1993–94 | Jokerit | SM-l | 37 | 11 | 8 | 19 | 43 | 12 | 2 | 0 | 2 | 6 |
| 1994–95 | Jokerit | SM-l | 20 | 6 | 7 | 13 | 4 | 8 | 2 | 1 | 3 | 0 |
| 1995–96 | Jokerit | SM-l | 34 | 12 | 11 | 23 | 14 | 8 | 2 | 1 | 3 | 0 |
| 1996–97 | Jokerit | SM-l | 41 | 10 | 8 | 18 | 12 | 4 | 0 | 1 | 1 | 4 |
| 1997–98 | Jokerit | SM-l | 28 | 3 | 5 | 8 | 8 | 8 | 2 | 1 | 3 | 2 |
| 1998–99 | SaiPa | SM-l | 28 | 7 | 14 | 21 | 26 | — | — | — | — | — |
| 1999–2000 | SaiPa | SM-l | 44 | 6 | 7 | 13 | 16 | — | — | — | — | — |
| 2000–01 | Blues | SM-l | 14 | 1 | 3 | 4 | 4 | — | — | — | — | — |
| SM-l totals | | | 420 | 142 | 139 | 281 | 183 | 53 | 14 | 11 | 25 | 14 |

=== International ===
| Year | Team | Event | GP | G | A | Pts | PIM |
|---|---|---|---|---|---|---|---|
| 1988 | Finland | EJC | 6 | 8 | 4 | 12 | 4 |
| 1989 | Finland | WJC | 7 | 2 | 0 | 2 | 2 |
| 1990 | Finland | WJC | 7 | 4 | 3 | 7 | 2 |
| 1992 | Finland | OG | 8 | 1 | 0 | 1 | 4 |
| 1992 | Finland | WC | 7 | 2 | 1 | 3 | 0 |
| 1993 | Finland | WC | 6 | 0 | 0 | 0 | 2 |
| Junior totals | | | 20 | 14 | 7 | 21 | 8 |
| Senior totals | | | 21 | 3 | 1 | 4 | 6 |

| Preceded by Teemu Selänne | Winner of the Raimo Kilpiö trophy 1991-92 | Succeeded by Esa Keskinen |
| Preceded by Matti Virmanen | General Manager of Jokerit; 2008- | Succeeded by current |
