= 1953–54 SM-sarja season =

Finnish ice hockey season

The 1953–54 SM-sarja season was the 23rd season of the SM-sarja, the top level of ice hockey in Finland. 10 teams participated in the league, and TBK Tampere won the championship.

== Regular season ==
=== Group A ===
	Club	Sp	W	T	L	GF–GA	Pts
1.	Karhu-Kissat Helsinki	8	5	2	1	27:21	12
2.	TPS Turku	8	4	1	3	37:30	9
3.	TK-V Tampere	8	4	0	4	24:34	8
4.	Tarmo Hämeenlinna	8	2	2	4	34:30	6
5.	Ilves Tampere	8	2	1	5	27:34	5

Source: Elite Prospects

=== Group B ===
	Club	Sp	W	T	L	GF–GA	Pts
1.	TBK Tampere	8	6	1	1	42:20	13
2.	HPK Hämeenlinna	8	6	1	1	40:24	13
3.	HIFK Helsinki	8	3	2	3	40:46	8
4.	HJK Helsinki	8	1	2	5	33:37	4
5.	KuPS Kuopio	8	1	0	7	23:51	2

Source: Elite Prospects

==== Qualification for final ====
- TBK Tampere - HPK Hämeenlinna 6:2

== 3rd place ==
- HPK Hämeenlinna - TPS Turku 6:5/5:5 OT

== Final ==
- Karhu-Kissat Helsinki - TBK Tampere 0:4/0:4

Preceded by 1952–53 SM-sarja season	SM-sarja season 1953–54	Succeeded by 1954–55 SM-sarja season
