= Esa Pirnes =

Finnish ice hockey player (born 1977)

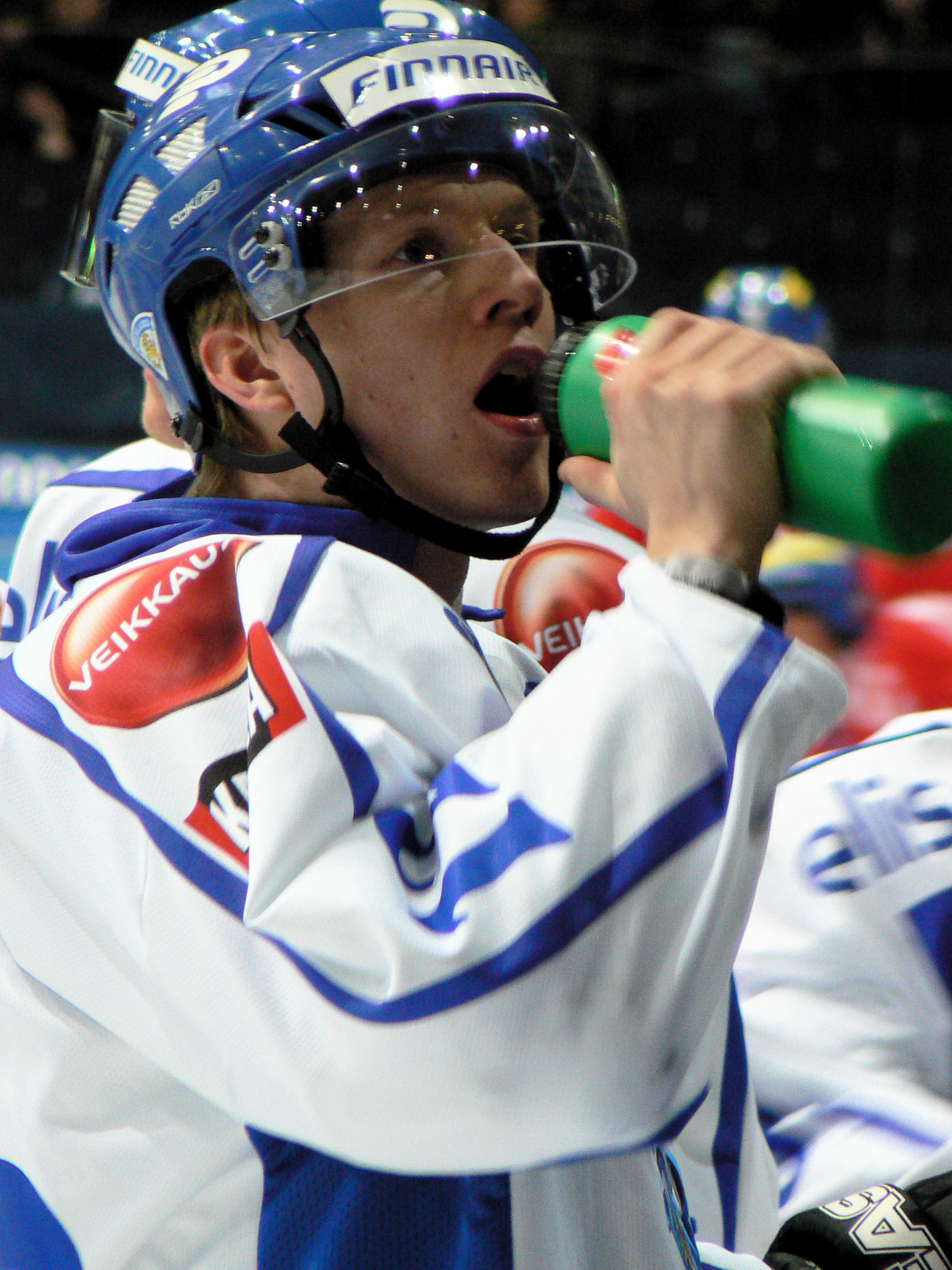
- Born: April 1, 1977 (age 49) Oulu, Finland
- Height: 6 ft 0 in (183 cm)
- Weight: 185 lb (84 kg; 13 st 3 lb)
- Position: Centre
- Shot: Left
- Played for: Oulun Kärpät; Espoo Blues; Tappara; Los Angeles Kings; Lukko; Färjestads BK; Atlant Moscow Oblast; Jokerit; EV Zug; AIK IF
- National team: Finland
- NHL draft: 174th overall, 2003; Los Angeles Kings
- Playing career: 1995–2016

Esa Lasse Juhani Pirnes (born April 1, 1977) is a Finnish former professional ice hockey centre. He played most of his career, which lasted from 1995 to 2016, in the Finnish Liiga. He also played 57 games in the National Hockey League with the Los Angeles Kings during the 2003–04 season, after the Kings selected him in the 6th round (174th overall) of the 2003 NHL entry draft. Internationally Pirnes played for the Finnish national team at four World Championships, winning two bronze medals.

== Playing career ==
Pirnes started his career with Kärpät in the Finnish second league in 1995 and played with them until 1999, when he signed with SM-Liiga club Blues. He stayed with the Blues for two seasons before he moved to rivals Tappara in 2001. In 2003, he was drafted by the Kings after four good seasons in SM-Liiga. Pirnes went over the Atlantic Ocean to play in the National Hockey League. But he did not have the same success in NHL as he had in Finland. Despite playing 57 games with LA he only scored 11 points. Before the season was over he also played a few games with the Kings's farm team, Manchester Monarchs of the AHL. He was named to team Finland in the 2004 World Cup of Hockey roster, but did not play a game. But he did not stay in the NHL, instead he went back home to Finland and signed with Lukko for the 2004/05 season.

After one year in Lukko he moved back to his former club, Blues. But after the season he signed with his fifth club in five years, Swedish club Färjestads BK, for the 2006/07 season. In Färjestad he was re-united with his former teammate from Lukko, Janne Niskala. In the Season 2008/2009 Pirnes signed to play for Atlant Moscow Oblast and left the club on May 6, 2009, the club to sign with Jokerit.

In May 2012, Pirnes signed with AIK of the Swedish Elitserien (SEL).

Sometime in 2020, Pirnes became the European Development Coach for the New Jersey Devils of the NHL.

== Career statistics ==
=== Regular season and playoffs ===
			Regular season					Playoffs
Season	Team	League	GP	G	A	Pts	PIM	GP	G	A	Pts	PIM
1993–94	Kärpät	FIN U18	31	15	15	30	24	4	1	0	1	2
1994–95	Kärpät	FIN U18	6	6	3	9	8	—	—	—	—	—
1994–95	Kärpät	FIN U20	18	3	3	6	10	—	—	—	—	—
1995–96	Kärpät	FIN U20	24	13	32	8	—	—	—	—	—
1995–96	Kärpät	FIN-2	20	8	4	12	12	3	0	0	0	0
1996–97	Kärpät	FIN U20	25	2	7	9	18	—	—	—	—	—
1996–97	Kärpät	FIN-2	36	17	16	33	20	9	0	2	2	16
1997–98	Kärpät	FIN U20	6	5	8	13	2	—	—	—	—	—
1997–98	Kärpät	FIN-2	32	6	15	21	12	—	—	—	—	—
1998–99	Kärpät	FIN-2	26	26	52	16	5	0	3	3	2
1999–00	Blues	FIN	51	15	24	39	12	4	0	1	1	2
2000–01	Blues	FIN	54	10	8	18	51	—	—	—	—	—
2001–02	Tappara	FIN	49	8	16	24	30	10	0	1	1	2
2002–03	Tappara	FIN	56	23	14	37	6	15	5	9	14	2
2003–04	Los Angeles Kings	NHL	57	3	8	11	12	—	—	—	—	—
2003–04	Manchester Monarchs	AHL	4	3	1	4	2	—	—	—	—	—
2004–05	Lukko	FIN	47	9	29	38	31	9	1	3	4	2
2005–06	Blues	FIN	44	10	23	33	24	9	5	3	8	2
2006–07	Färjestads BK	SEL	43	17	26	43	28	9	2	3	5	8
2007–08	Färjestads BK	SEL	52	15	23	38	74	12	4	3	7	12
2008–09	Atlant Moscow Oblast	KHL	51	22	28	50	84	—	—	—	—	—
2009–10	Jokerit	FIN	58	17	21	38	46	—	—	—	—	—
2010–11	Jokerit	FIN	39	9	12	21	57	3	1	0	1	2
2011–12	EV Zug	NLA	29	12	14	26	4	3	0	0	0	25
2012–13	AIK	SEL	45	10	20	30	28	—	—	—	—	—
2013–14	AIK	SHL	43	10	14	24	38	—	—	—	—	—
2013–14	Kärpät	FIN	11	3	3	6	4	16	4	4	8	8
2014–15	Kärpät	FIN	46	15	13	28	30	19	7	9	16	10
2015–16	Kärpät	FIN	45	10	15	25	10	11	2	4	6	2
FIN totals			500	129	178	307	299	97	25	34	59	32
NHL totals			57	3	8	11	12	—	—	—	—	—

=== International ===
Medal record

Representing Finland

Ice hockey

World Championships
Bronze medal – third place	2006 Latvia	
Bronze medal – third place	2008 Canada	

Year	Team	Event	GP	G	A	Pts	PIM
1997	Finland	WJC	6	1	0	1	0
2003	Finland	WC	6	2	3	5	4
2004	Finland	WC	7	0	0	0	6
2006	Finland	WC	8	1	3	4	4
2008	Finland	WC	4	0	0	0	0
Junior totals			6	1	0	1	0
Senior totals			25	3	6	9	14

Awards and achievements
Preceded by Kari Lehtonen	Winner of the Jari Kurri trophy 2002–03	Succeeded by Niklas Bäckström
Preceded by Jani Rita	Winner of the Raimo Kilpiö trophy 2005–06	Succeeded by Tommi Paakkolanvaara
