= Ernest A. Hakanen =

Ernest A. Hakanen (born 1958) is a social theorist. He is professor emeritus of communication at Drexel University, specializing in media effects and history, and was the founding director of the Communication, Culture and Media graduate programs. His scholarly articles have appeared in journals such as Journalism Quarterly, Popular Music, Explorations in Media Ecology, the Journal of Social Semiotics, the Journal of Broadcasting and Electronic Media, and the Journal of Information Science.

== Early life and education ==
Hakanen earned a PhD in communication from Temple University in 1989.

== Career ==
From 1990 to 1992 Hakanen was an assistant professor of Broadcast and Electronic Communication at Marquette University. He researched the connection between popular music and emotion in adolescents. He has continued that research applying it to video games and streaming technologies at Drexel University. He was an Annenberg Scholar in 1991, a fellow at the Critical Theory Institute in 1997, and was a visiting scholar in 2017 at the Bertalanffy Center for the Study of Scientific Structures in Vienna, Austria.

Hakanen has written and edited several books about the media, including 2006's Branding the Teleself: Media Effects Discourse and the Changing Self. He also co-edited Signs of War: From Patriotism to Dissent with Anne-Marie Obajtek-Kirkwood, and Leading to the 2003 Iraq War: The Global Media Debate with Alexander G. Nikolaev. He has conducted studies and written social analysis of various aspects of popular culture.
