= Matti Murto =

Finnish ice hockey player

Matti Erkki Olavi Murto (9 April 1949 - 19 August 2013) was a professional ice hockey player who played in the SM-liiga. He played for HIFK. He was inducted into the Finnish Hockey Hall of Fame in 1991.
