= HIFK Hockey =

Ice hockey club in Helsinki, Finland

HIFK
- Nickname: Röda (The Reds) Röda pantrar (The Red Panthers); Punainen Stadista (Red from Helsinki) Stadens Stolthet (Pride from the Capital)
- City: Helsinki
- League: SM-liiga
- Founded: 1897
- Home arena: Helsingin jäähalli (capacity: 8,200)
- Colours: Red, white, dark blue
- Owner: HIFK Ligaföreningen rf.
- General manager: Jukka Valtanen
- Head coach: Tommi Miettinen
- Captain: Ilari Melart
- Parent club: HIFK
- Farm club: Jokipojat
- Website: hifk.fi
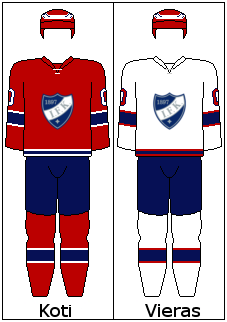

Championships
- Playoff championships: 1969, 1970, 1974, 1980, 1983, 1998, 2011

HIFK Hockey (a traditional abbreviation of the Swedish name Idrottsföreningen Kamraterna, Helsingfors, English: "Sporting Society Comrades, Helsinki") is a professional ice hockey team based in Helsinki, Finland that plays in the SM-liiga, the sport's top-level league in Finland. The team plays at Helsinki Ice Hall.

== History ==
IFK Helsingfors was founded in 1897 and started participating in ice hockey in 1928. Since then, HIFK has won the Finnish national championship seven times, of which three (1969, 1970, 1974) were in SM-sarja and four (1980, 1983, 1998, 2011) were in the SM-liiga. HIFK has the highest number of audience in the SM-liiga and is one of the wealthiest sports clubs in Finland.

One of the major influences to HIFK was the NHL veteran and Stanley Cup winner Carl Brewer. Hired in 1968 as a playing coach, he advocated a North American style of play which has persisted in HIFK since. Brewer's influence on the way ice hockey is played in Finland led to his posthumous induction to the Finnish Hockey Hall of Fame in 2003.

The championship team from 1998 is widely recognized as one of the best ever to have skated together in the top flight of Finnish ice hockey. Players on the 1998 championship team included a number of future (and former) NHL players – including Tim Thomas, Jan Čaloun, Johan Davidsson, Bob Halkidis, Olli Jokinen, Jere Karalahti, Jarno Kultanen, Brian Rafalski, Christian Ruuttu, Jarkko Ruutu, Kimmo Timonen and Marko Tuomainen.

HIFK's general manager starting from May 1, 2008, is Jukka Valtanen. He is the successor of Pentti Matikainen, who coached Team Finland to its first hockey Olympic medal (silver) in Calgary 1988.

Bandy, an older sport than hockey, is also played by a subdivision of the HIFK Hockey team.

== Team identity ==
=== Logos and jerseys ===
HIFK uses a shield for their logo, with a four pointed star and text I.F.K. and year of formation 1897 on it. They wear red, white and blue colored jerseys, and have worn those colors since their beginnings. For the 1993-94 season, HIFK changed their logo to a five pointed star with text saying HIFK Hockey on it. Unpopular with fans, and HIFK wanting to modernize their brand, changed their logo again in 1996 to a red big cat on a blue circle. Commonly referred to as "petologo" (English: "beast logo") among fans. When the beast logo became HIFK's primary logo for the 1996-97 season, they reintroduced the original shield logo to become their jersey's new shoulder patches. For the 2008-09 season, HIFK made their original shield logo the primary logo once again. It would swap places with the beast logo on the jerseys, making the beast logo their new shoulder patches until the 2017-18 season, when the beast logo was eliminated from the jerseys entirely.

HIFK's multi-sport association shield logo has also previously served as the primary logo.

HIFK's shield logo, used as their primary logo in 1928-1993, 2008-present; as well as their secondary Beast logo in 1996-2008.

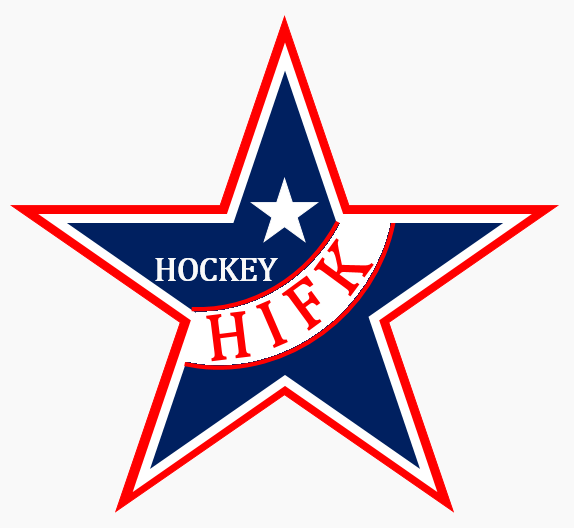
HIFK's star logo, used as their primary logo in 1993-1996.

The four-pointed star is the earliest emblem of IFK clubs (Idrottsföreningen Kamraterna).

=== Home arena ===
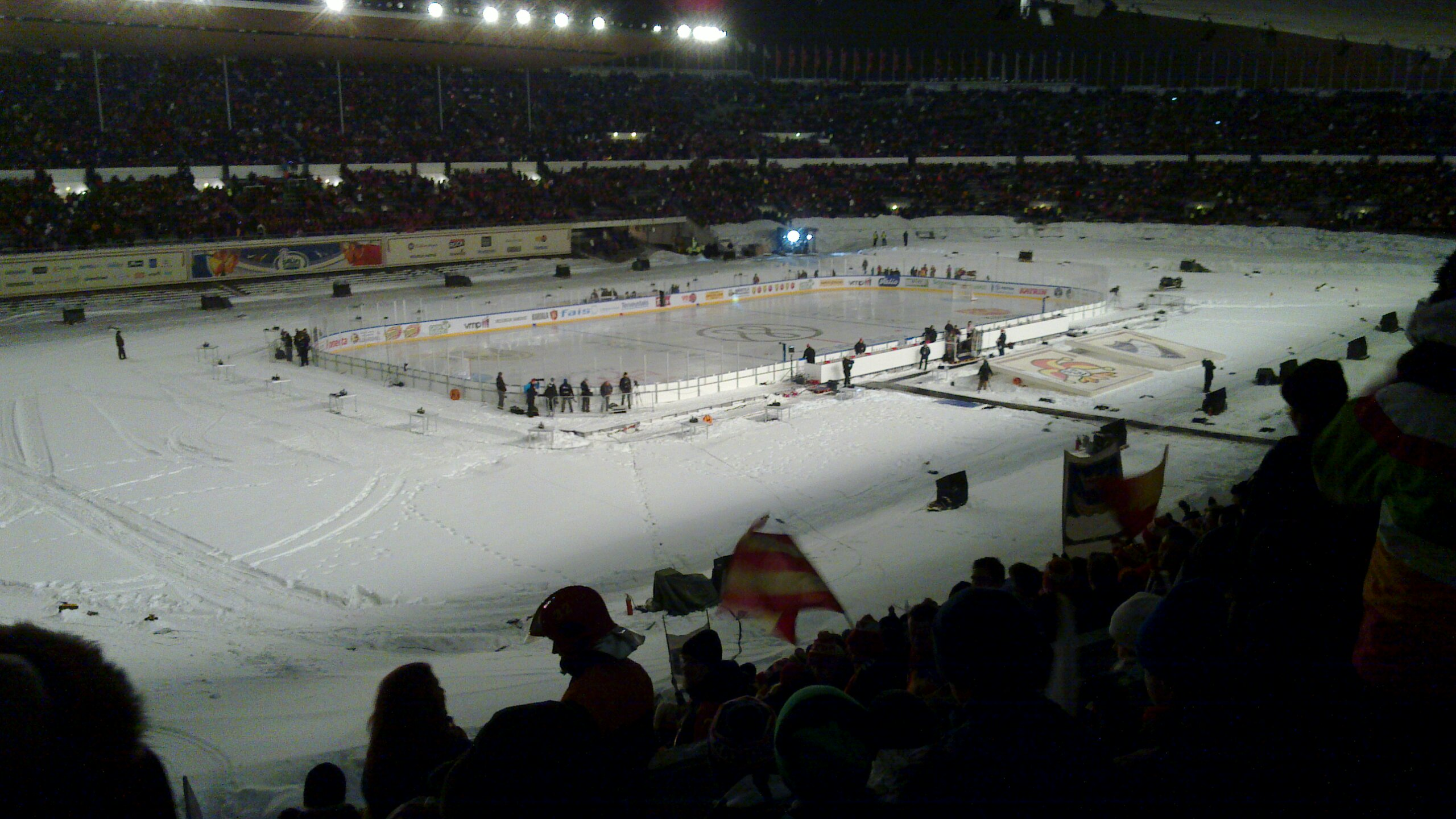
Jokerit-HIFK Winter classic match played on Helsinki Olympic Stadium

HIFK play their home games at Helsinki Ice Hall. The stadium opened in 1966, and seats up to 8 200 spectators. The arena was also used and shared by rival team Jokerit until 1997, when they moved to the Hartwall Arena. During season 2024-2025, Jokerit returned to Helsinki Ice Hall for their home games due to not having access to the Hartwall Arena nor a viable replacement available. HIFK is well known for playing classic hard rock music during games in Helsinki Ice Hall.

- Goal song: "Flamethrower" by The J. Geils Band.
- Opening songs: "Hail To The King" by Avenged Sevenfold, "Ghost Riders" by Steve Hunter, and "Whatever You Want" by Status Quo.
- Penalty songs: "Who Are You" by The Who when the visiting team takes a penalty. "Bad To The Bone" by George Thorogood when the home team takes a penalty.
- Other noteworthy songs: "Let's Play Hockey" by Bill Misener, "Red White & Blue" by Lynyrd Skynyrd, "Go IFK" by Jake & Co.

=== Rivalries ===
HIFK are rivals with Jokerit; games were often sold out and were in the later years among the fiercest in Nordic ice hockey. Following Jokerit's withdrawal from Liiga after the 2013–14 season to join the Russian-based Kontinental Hockey League (KHL) and later joining the lower level of Finnish hockey Mestis, the teams have not faced each other in over a decade. Following a history of even series of games, HIFK won the game total with 106–105 after a 2–1 victory in a classical outdoor game in March 2014, claiming the title of Helsinki's dominion. The teams will face each other again in the upcoming 2026–27 Liiga season following Jokerit's promotion from Mestis.

== Honors ==
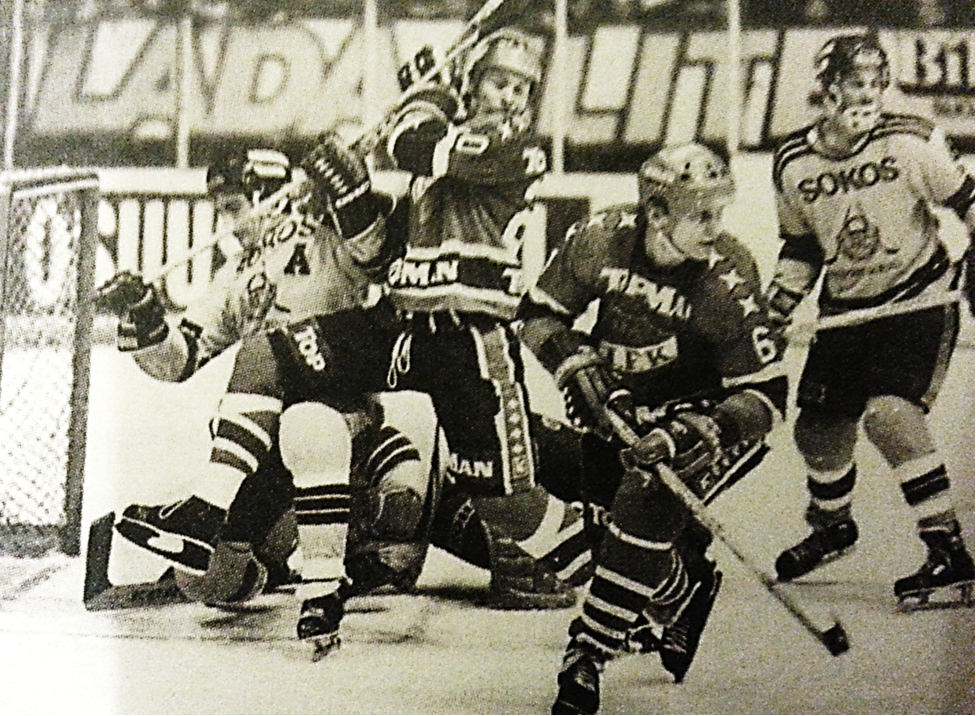
HIFK against Rauman Lukko

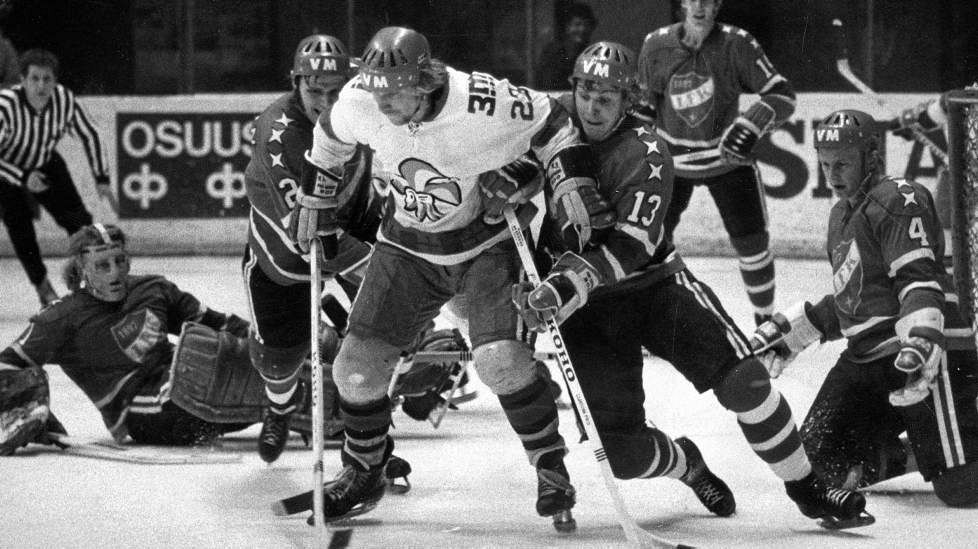
HIFK against Jokerit

=== SM-sarja ===
- (gold) SM-sarja Kanada-malja: 1969, 1970, 1974
- (silver) SM-sarja Kanada-malja: 1973, 1975
- (bronze) SM-sarja Kanada-malja: 1955, 1959, 1971, 1972

=== SM-liiga ===
- (gold) SM-liiga Kanada-malja: 1980, 1983, 1998, 2011
- (silver) SM-liiga Kanada-malja: 1986, 1999, 2016
- (bronze) SM-liiga Kanada-malja: 1982, 1987, 1988, 1992, 2004, 2018, 2021

=== International ===
- (gold) Ahearne Cup (1): 1970
- (gold) Tampere Cup (2): 1994, 2015
- (silver) IIHF European Cup (1): 1980–81
- (bronze) Nordic Trophy (1): 2008

Other awards for the club:

- Harry Lindblad trophy (SM-Liiga regular season winner, since 1975): 2016

== Players ==
=== Current roster ===
Updated 22 September 2024

No.	Nat	Player	Pos	S/G	Age	Acquired	Birthplace
50	(Slovakia)	Rastislav Eliáš	G	L	22	2024	Nyíregyháza, Hungary
79	(Finland)	Santeri Hartikainen	C	R	27	2023	Helsinki, Finland
85	(Finland)	Bruno Jalasti	D	R	20	2024	Helsinki, Finland
61	(Finland)	Juhani Jasu	C	R	38	2024	Eurajoki, Finland
82	(Finland)	Aatu Karjalainen	W	L	21	2024	Hyvinkää, Finland
24	(Finland)	Aleksanteri Kaskimäki	C	L	22	2022	Espoo, Finland
33	(Finland)	Aron Kiviharju	D	L	20	2023	Esbjerg, Denmark
3	(Czech Republic)	Ronald Knot	D	R	32	2024	Prague, Czech Republic
77	(Czech Republic)	Petr Kodÿtek	C	L	28	2024	Sušice, Czech Republic
47	(Finland)	Leo Komarov	W	L	39	2023	Narva, Estonian SSR, Soviet Union
21	(Finland)	Jori Lehterä (A)	C	L	38	2023	Espoo, Finland
40	(Finland)	Petteri Lindbohm (A)	D	L	33	2023	Helsinki, Finland
83	(Finland)	Einari Luhanka	D	L	27	2022	Helsinki, Finland
14	(Finland)	Oskari Manninen	D	L	35	2023	Vantaa, Finland
43	(Canada)	Vincent Marleau	RW	R	27	2023	Saint-Michel, Quebec, Canada
11	(Finland)	Ilari Melart (C)	D	L	37	2022	Helsinki, Finland
63	(Finland)	Panu Mieho	C	L	31	2024	Helsinki, Finland
71	(Finland)	Daniel Mäkiaho	RW	L	25	2024	Kauniainen, Finland
4	(Finland)	Niklas Nykyri	D	L	20	2024	Joensuu, Finland
81	(Finland)	Iiro Pakarinen (A)	RW	R	35	2021	Suonenjoki, Finland
55	(Finland)	Valtteri Piironen	RW	L	21	2024	Helsinki, Finland
88	(Finland)	Joonas Rask	RW	R	36	2023	Savonlinna, Finland
78	(Finland)	Jesse Seppälä	LW	L	24	2022	Espoo, Finland
6	(Finland)	Tony Sund	D	L	31	2023	Pedersöre, Finland
30	(Finland)	Roope Taponen	G	L	25	2021	Espoo, Finland
10	(Finland)	Kristian Vesalainen (A)	LW	L	27	2022	Helsinki, Finland
90	(Finland)	Eemil Vinni	G	L	20	2022	Vantaa, Finland
45	(Finland)	Micke-Max Åsten	C	L	34	2014	Helsinki, Finland

=== Retired numbers ===
- 1 Stig Wetzell, 1972–1983
- 5 Heikki Riihiranta, 1967–1983
- 7 Simo Saarinen, 1980–1996
- 9 Kimmo Kuhta, 1996–2013
- 17 Matti Murto, 1964–1983
- 20 Matti Hagman, 1972–1992
- 22 Mika Kortelainen, 1987–2002
- 23 Pertti Lehtonen, 1976–1998
- 32 Lennart Petrell, 2003-2020
- 35 Sakari Lindfors, 1985–2002

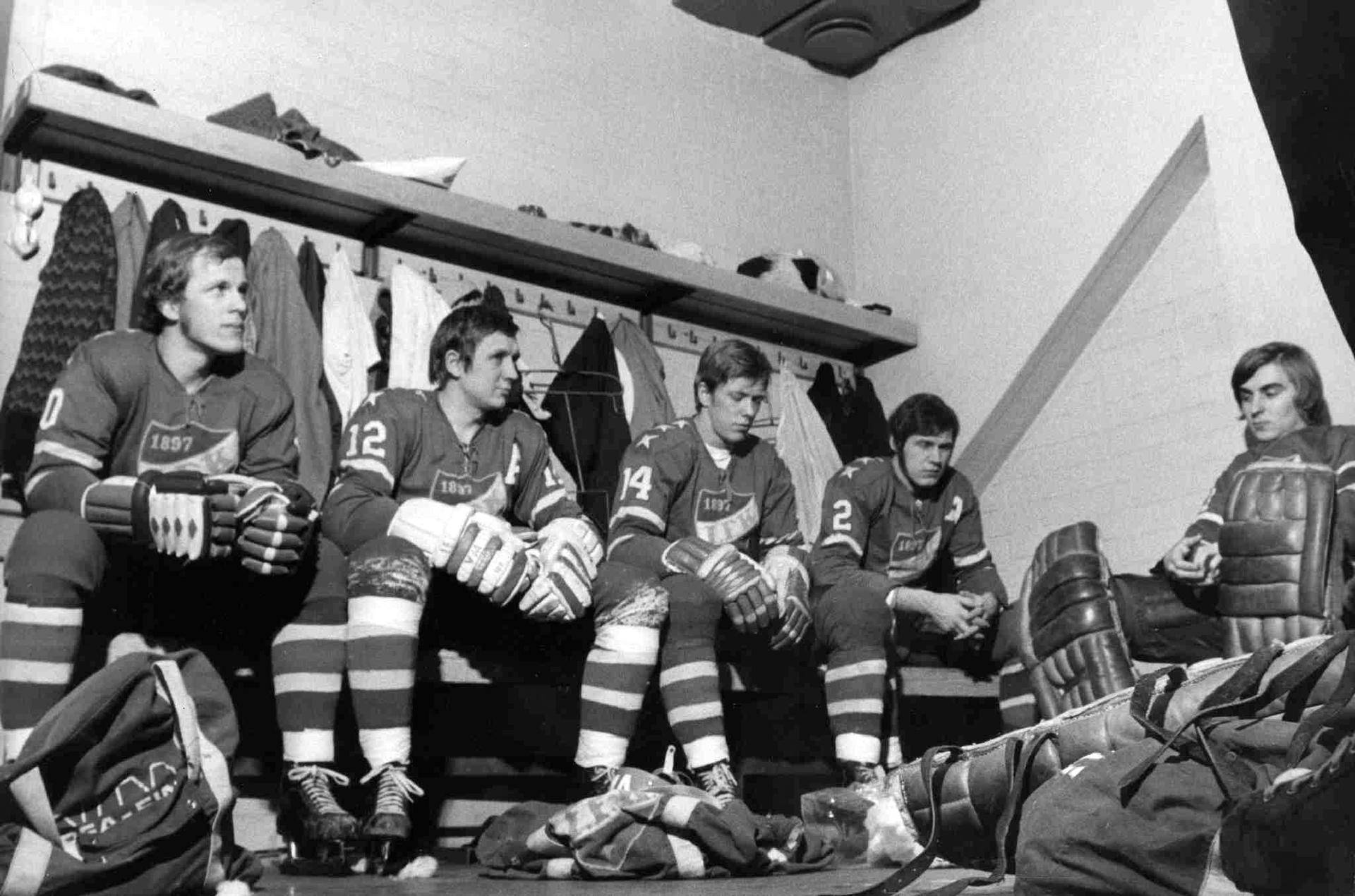
HIFK players getting ready for a game in 1971

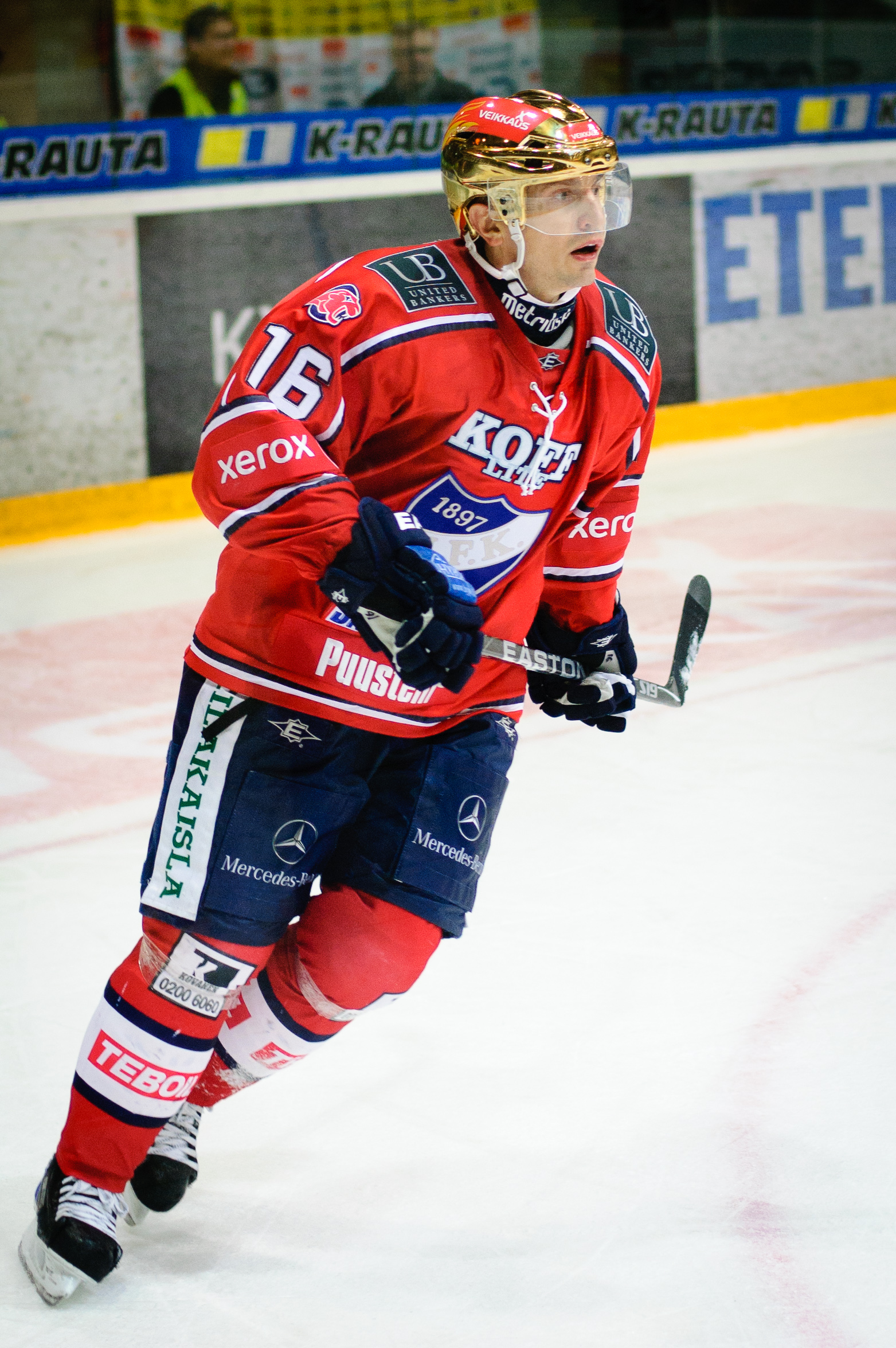
Ville Peltonen served as captain of HIFK in 2010–2014.

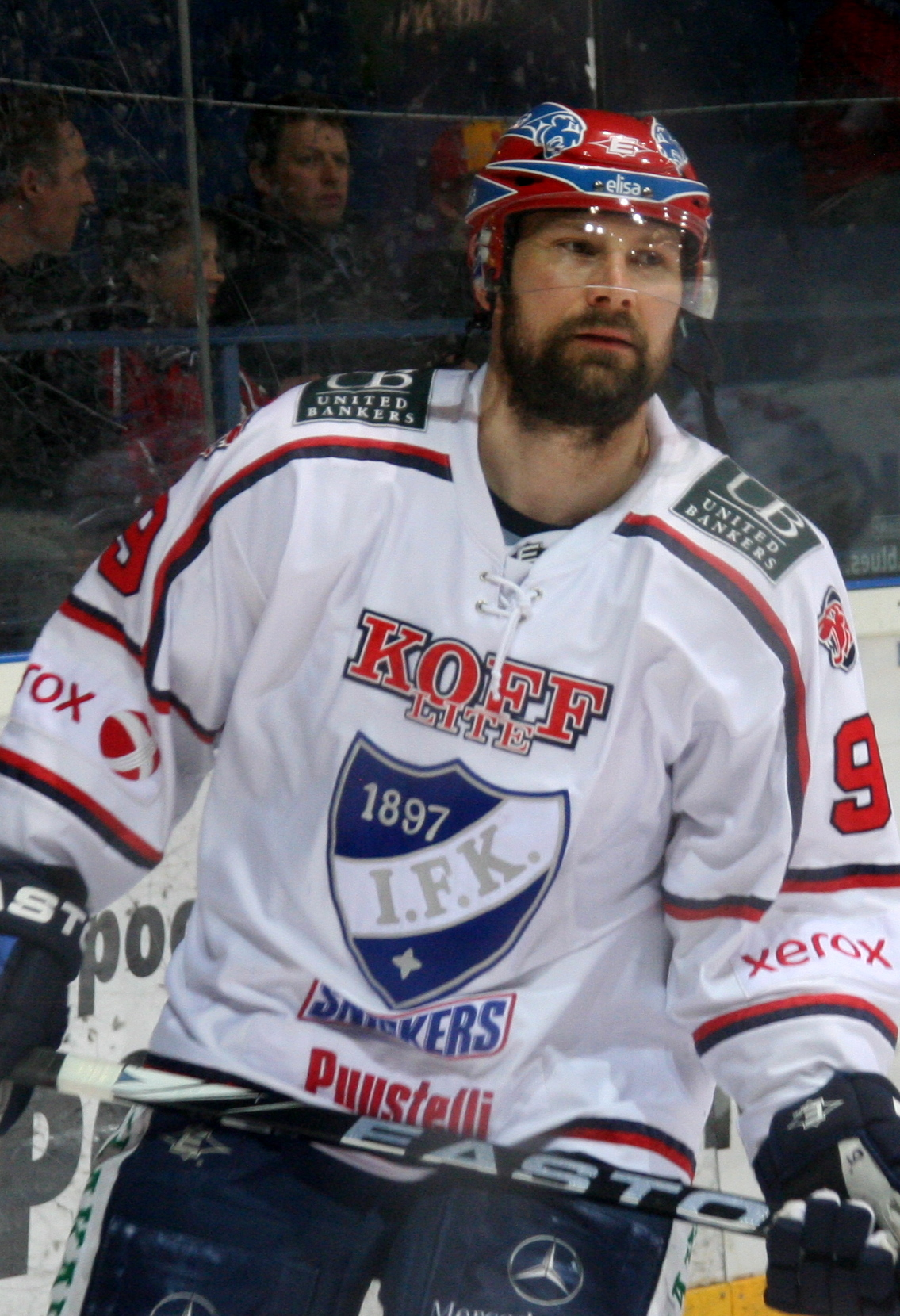
Kimmo Kuhta

=== NHL alumni ===
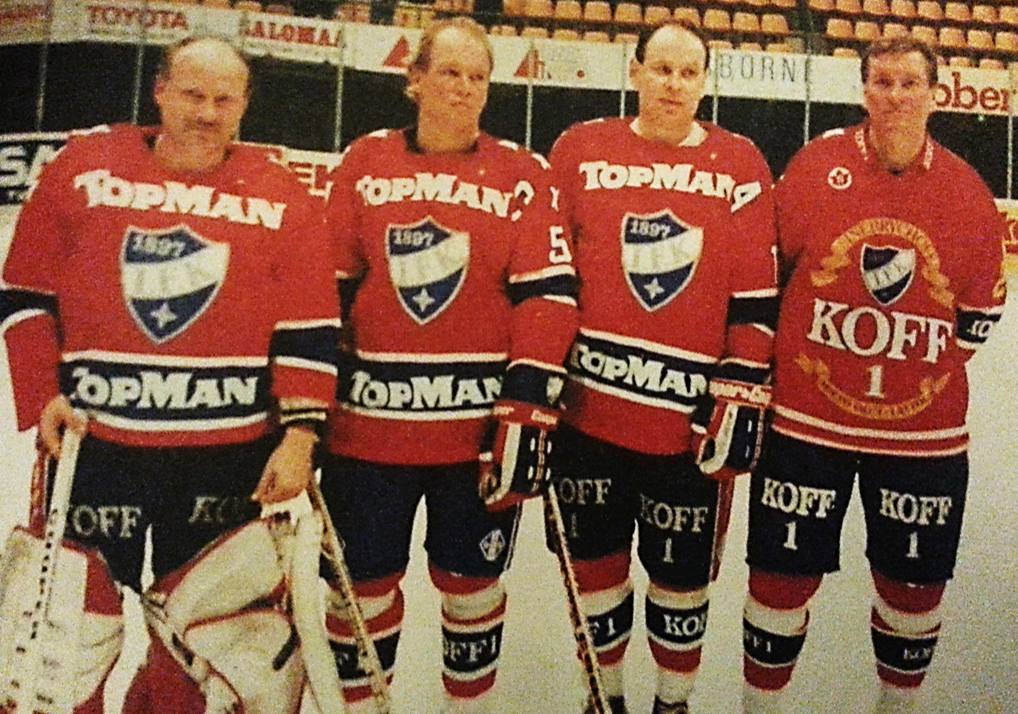
HIFK players, Stig Wetzell, Heikki Riihiranta, Matti Murto and Matti Hagman in a group picture in 1992.

- (Finland) Peter Ahola
- (United States) Tom Askey
- (Canada) Keith Aulie
- (France) Yohann Auvitu
- (Canada) Jamie Baker
- (United States) Shawn Bates
- (Czech Republic) Jaroslav Bednar
- (Sweden) Emil Bemström
- (Czech Republic) Ladislav Benýšek
- (Finland) Sean Bergenheim
- (United States) Tim Bergland
- (United States) Tom Bissett
- (Finland) Henrik Borgström
- (Canada) Luciano Borsato
- (Canada) Darren Boyko
- (Canada) Kip Brennan
- (Canada) Carl Brewer
- (United States) Alex Broadhurst
- (Finland) Niklas Bäckström
- (Czech Republic) Jan Čaloun
- (Canada) Sébastien Centomo
- (Canada) Dale Clarke
- (Sweden) Johan Davidsson
- (Canada) Tom Draper
- (United States) Parris Duffus
- (United States) Corey Elkins
- (Finland) Miika Elomo
- (Canada) Rico Fata
- (United States) Joe Finley
- (Canada) Trevor Gillies
- (Canada) Raymond Giroux
- (Russia) Nikolai Goldobin
- (Finland) Markus Granlund
- (Finland) Mikael Granlund
- (Canada) Steve Guolla
- (Finland) Matti Hagman
- (Finland) Niklas Hagman
- (Canada) Bob Halkidis
- (United States) Jeff Hamilton
- (United States) Brett Harkins
- (Finland) Ilkka Heikkinen
- (Finland) Miro Heiskanen
- (Finland) Roope Hintz
- (Czech Republic) Jan Hrdina
- (Finland) Ville Husso
- (Finland) Hannes Hyvönen
- (Finland) Kari Jalonen
- (Finland) Mikko Jokela
- (Finland) Olli Jokinen
- (Finland) Martti Järventie
- (Finland) Iiro Järvi
- (Finland) Jari Kaarela
- (Finland) Sami Kapanen
- (Finland) Jere Karalahti
- (Finland) Michael Keränen
- (Finland) Otto Koivula
- (Finland) Jarno Kultanen
- (Finland) Teemu Laakso
- (Finland) Kevin Lankinen
- (Canada) Lucas Lessio
- (Finland) Joona Luoto
- (Canada) Ross Lupaschuk
- (Finland) Toni Lydman
- (Canada) John Madden
- (Slovakia) Ivan Majesky
- (Finland) Anssi Melametsä
- (Canada) Sandy Moger
- (Sweden) Johan Motin
- (United States) Cory Murphy
- (Canada) Raymond Murray
- (Canada) Todd Nelson
- (Finland) Mika Noronen
- (United States) Patrick O'Sullivan
- (Finland) Joni Ortio
- (Finland) Iiro Pakarinen
- (Finland) Ville Peltonen
- (Canada) Joël Perrault
- (Canada) Mathieu Perreault
- (Finland) Janne Pesonen
- (Finland) Lennart Petrell
- (Finland) Ilkka Pikkarainen
- (Finland) Lasse Pirjetä
- (Slovakia) Andrej Podkonicky
- (Finland) Timo Pärssinen
- (Canada) Kyle Quincey
- (United States) Brian Rafalski
- (Finland) Joonas Rask
- (Finland) Pekka Rautakallio
- (Finland) Christian Ruuttu
- (Finland) Tuomo Ruutu
- (Finland) Jarkko Ruutu
- (Finland) Simo Saarinen
- (Finland) Tony Salmelainen
- (Finland) Tommi Santala
- (Italy) (Canada) Ryan Savoia
- (Czech Republic) Robert Schnabel
- (Czech Republic) Roman Simicek
- (Finland) Ilkka Sinisalo
- (Finland) Ville Sirén
- (Czech Republic) Martin Spanhel
- (Finland) Antti Suomela
- (United States) Ryan Thang
- (United States) Tim Thomas
- (United States) Billy Tibbetts
- (Finland) Esa Tikkanen
- (Finland) Kimmo Timonen
- (Canada) Brad Thiessen
- (Finland) Marko Tuomainen
- (United States) Ryan Vesce
- (Czech Republic) Tomáš Vokoun
- (Czech Republic) Roman Vopat
- (Canada) Peter White
- (Finland) Petteri Wirtanen
- (Czech Republic) Marek Židlický

=== Other notable alumni ===
- (Canada) Dave Siciliano, player-coach during the 1971–72 season
