= Mikko Hakkarainen =

Finnish ice hockey centre

- Born: July 30, 1976 (age 48); Iisalmi, Finland
- Height: 5 ft 9 in (175 cm)
- Weight: 176 lb (80 kg; 12 st 8 lb)
- Position: Centre
- Shot: Left
- Played for: KalPa; SaiPa; JYP
- Playing career: 1996–2013

Mikko Hakkarainen (born November 17, 1976) is a Finnish former professional ice hockey centre. He is currently working as team manager of Jukurit of Liiga.

Hakkarainen played a total of 263 games in the SM-liiga, playing for KalPa, SaiPa and JYP from 2005 to 2010.

== Career statistics ==
			Regular season					Playoffs
Season	Team	League	GP	G	A	Pts	PIM	GP	G	A	Pts	PIM
1992–93	Iisalmen Peli-Karhut	2. Divisioona	—	—	—	—	—	—	—	—	—	—
1994–95	KalPa U20	U20 SM-liiga	15	1	1	2	16	—	—	—	—	—
1995–96	KalPa U20	U20 SM-liiga	17	2	7	9	6	—	—	—	—	—
1995–96	Iisalmen Peli-Karhut	2. Divisioona	8	4	4	8	6	5	0	3	3	4
1996–97	Iisalmen Peli-Karhut	2. Divisioona	26	22	40	62	16	—	—	—	—	—
1997–98	Iisalmen Peli-Karhut	2. Divisioona	20	16	22	38	18	—	—	—	—	—
1998–99	Jukurit	2. Divisioona	13	5	6	11	4	—	—	—	—	—
1999–00	Jukurit	Suomi-sarja	33	12	24	36	18	8	4	5	9	0
2000–01	Jukurit	Mestis	41	6	18	24	8	12	1	3	4	10
2001–02	Jukurit	Mestis	31	9	16	25	22	9	1	2	3	12
2002–03	Jukurit	Mestis	30	4	13	17	34	12	0	0	0	32
2003–04	Jukurit	Mestis	30	3	9	12	12	13	2	7	9	6
2004–05	Jukurit	Mestis	41	3	16	19	46	5	0	0	0	2
2005–06	KalPa	SM-liiga	51	5	18	23	38	—	—	—	—	—
2006–07	SaiPa	SM-liiga	47	3	7	10	40	—	—	—	—	—
2006–07	SaPKo	Mestis	2	2	2	4	4	—	—	—	—	—
2006–07	Jukurit	Mestis	1	0	2	2	0	—	—	—	—	—
2007–08	SaiPa	SM-liiga	35	1	6	7	48	—	—	—	—	—
2008–09	JYP Jyväskylä	SM-liiga	57	8	11	19	89	13	0	5	5	18
2009–10	JYP Jyväskylä	SM-liiga	47	2	5	7	40	13	5	3	8	4
2010–11	Jukurit	Mestis	43	14	24	38	26	11	1	4	5	4
2011–12	Jukurit	Mestis	40	10	25	35	54	9	3	2	5	8
2012–13	Jukurit	Mestis	33	3	7	10	32	9	0	2	2	8
SM-liiga totals			237	19	47	66	255	26	5	8	13	22
Mestis totals			292	54	132	186	238	82	8	20	28	88
