= Iivo Hokkanen =

Finnish ice hockey centre

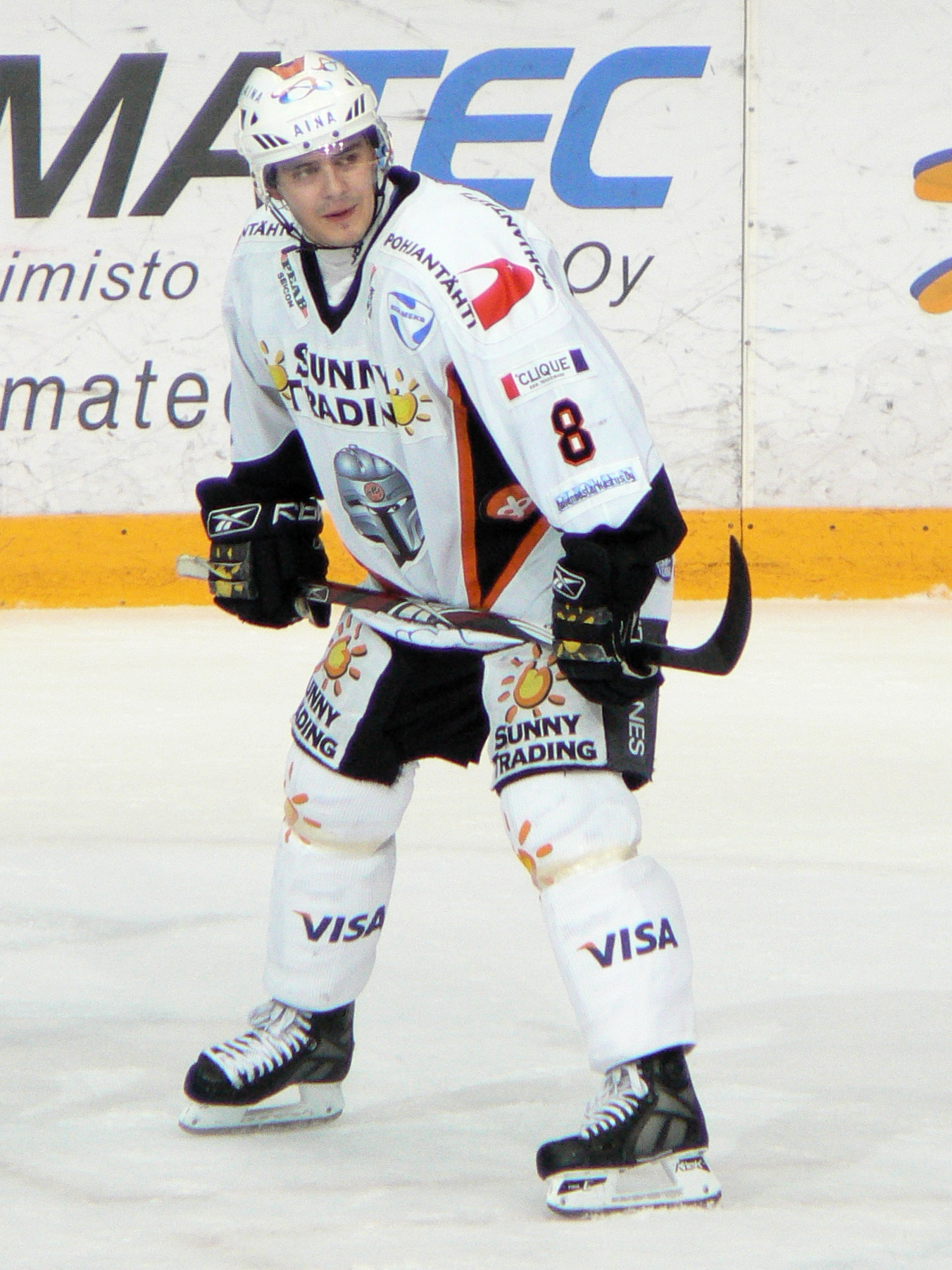
- Born: 3 May 1985 (age 39); Hämeenlinna, Finland
- Height: 5 ft 11 in (180 cm)
- Weight: 176 lb (80 kg; 12 st 8 lb)
- Position: Centre
- Shot: Left
- Played for: HPK; Tappara; HIFK
- Playing career: 2002–2017

Ilvo Hokkanen (born 3 May 1985) is a Finnish former ice hockey centre.

Hokkanen played in the SM-liiga for HPK, Tappara and HIFK. He also played in Germany's DEL2 for EHC Freiburg and in France's FFHG Division 1 for Anglet Hormadi Élite and Ligue Magnus for Pionniers de Chamonix-Morzine.

Hokkanen played in the 2005 World Junior Ice Hockey Championships for Finland.

== Career statistics ==
			Regular season					Playoffs
Season	Team	League	GP	G	A	Pts	PIM	GP	G	A	Pts	PIM
2000–01	Jukurit U16	U16 I-divisioona	14	10	17	27	12	7	6	0	6	10
2001–02	Jukurit U18	U18 I-divisioona	7	5	7	12	10	—	—	—	—	—
2001–02	Jukurit U20	U20 I-divisioona	16	8	5	13	6	—	—	—	—	—
2001–02	Jukurit	Mestis	1	0	0	0	0	—	—	—	—	—
2002–03	Jukurit U18	U18 I-divisioona	8	5	12	17	2	6	5	6	11	8
2002–03	Jukurit U20	U20 I-divisioona	12	4	11	15	22	—	—	—	—	—
2002–03	Jukurit U20	U20 Suomi-sarja	6	2	5	7	2	—	—	—	—	—
2002–03	Jukurit	Mestis	5	0	0	0	0	—	—	—	—	—
2003–04	Jukurit U20	U20 I-divisioona	12	2	9	11	14	—	—	—	—	—
2003–04	Jukurit U20	U20 Suomi-sarja	1	0	0	0	0	—	—	—	—	—
2003–04	Jukurit	Mestis	3	0	1	1	0	—	—	—	—	—
2003–04	HPK U20	U20 SM-liiga	25	4	7	11	4	—	—	—	—	—
2003–04	Suomi U20	Mestis	4	0	0	0	0	—	—	—	—	—
2004–05	Jukurit U20	U20 Suomi-sarja	1	1	0	1	2	—	—	—	—	—
2004–05	Jukurit	Mestis	36	2	6	8	8	9	0	0	0	2
2005–06	HPK U20	U20 SM-liiga	18	8	6	14	10	3	0	0	0	2
2005–06	HPK	SM-liiga	39	0	1	1	6	2	0	0	0	0
2005–06	TUTO Hockey	Mestis	2	1	0	1	4	—	—	—	—	—
2005–06	Haukat	Mestis	2	2	0	2	0	—	—	—	—	—
2006–07	HPK	SM-liiga	28	0	0	0	4	6	0	0	0	0
2006–07	HC Salamat	Mestis	1	0	1	1	0	—	—	—	—	—
2006–07	KooKoo	Mestis	20	3	10	13	20	—	—	—	—	—
2007–08	HPK	SM-liiga	45	3	10	13	40	—	—	—	—	—
2007–08	Tappara	SM-liiga	13	2	2	4	2	11	1	2	3	4
2008–09	Jukurit	Mestis	44	7	25	32	44	—	—	—	—	—
2009–10	KooKoo	Mestis	44	12	27	39	67	10	1	4	5	2
2010–11	KooKoo	Mestis	47	18	33	51	46	8	1	4	5	6
2011–12	KooKoo	Mestis	36	11	18	29	38	6	1	2	3	4
2011–12	HIFK	SM-liiga	2	0	0	0	2	—	—	—	—	—
2012–13	Jukurit	Mestis	29	1	14	15	10	2	1	3	4	0
2012–13	Hydraulic Oilers	Suomi-sarja	1	0	1	1	0	—	—	—	—	—
2013–14	Jukurit	Mestis	56	10	16	26	26	17	2	2	4	28
2014–15	Jukurit	Mestis	37	4	9	13	39	13	2	10	12	2
2015–16	EHC Freiburg	DEL2	11	0	7	7	14	—	—	—	—	—
2015–16	Anglet Hormadi Élite	France2	11	5	7	12	12	11	6	3	9	8
2016–17	Pionniers de Chamonix-Mont Blanc	Ligue Magnus	6	0	0	0	14	—	—	—	—	—
SM-liiga totals			127	5	13	18	54	19	1	2	3	4
Mestis totals			367	71	160	231	302	68	8	28	36	44
