= Carlo Grünn =

Finnish ice hockey player

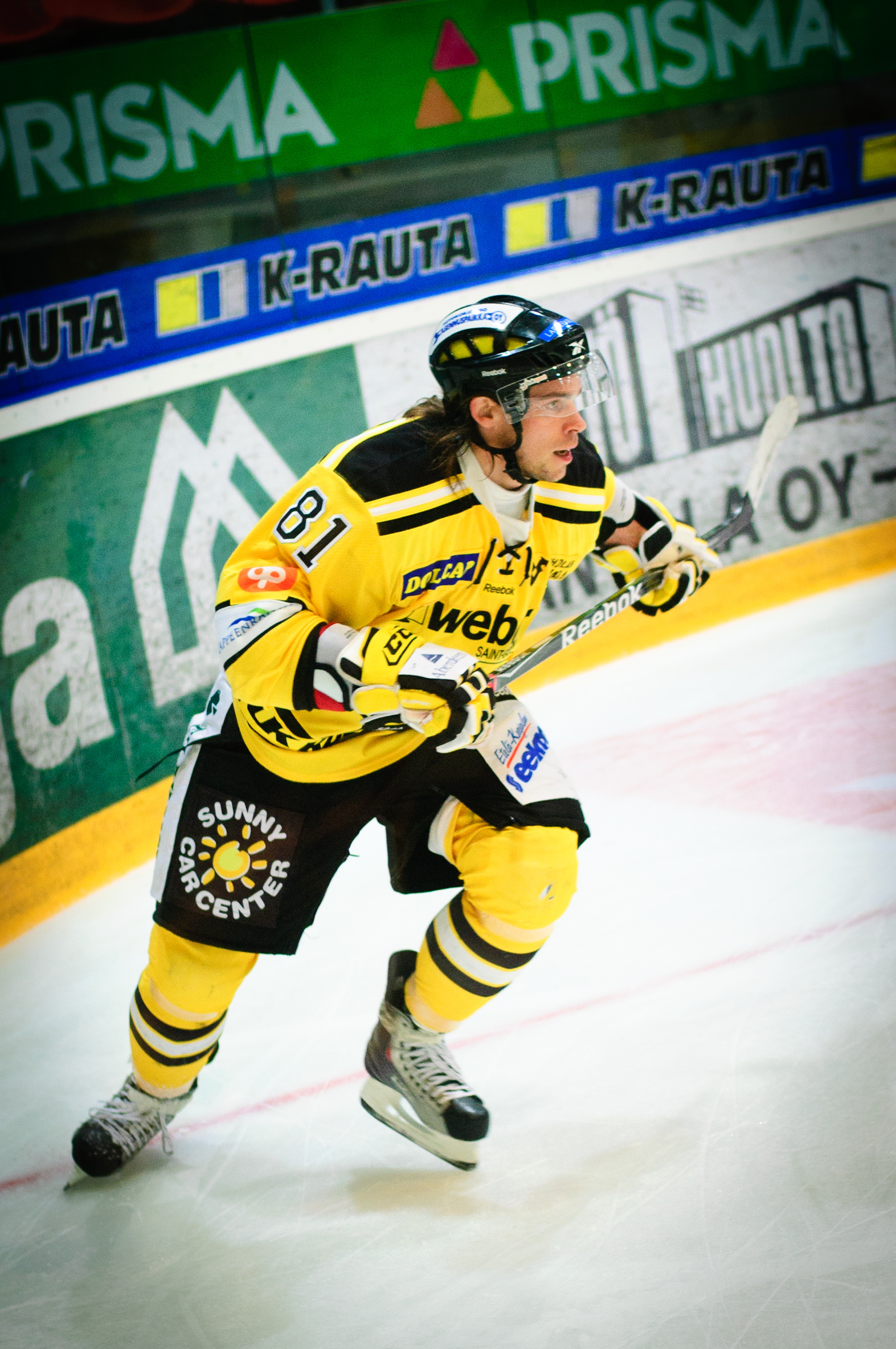
- Born: April 30, 1981 (age 45) Espoo, Finland
- Height: 5 ft 11 in (180 cm)
- Weight: 194 lb (88 kg; 13 st 12 lb)
- Position: Forward
- Shot: Left
- Played for: HIFK; Pelicans; JYP; Blues; HPK; SaiPa; ETC Crimmitschau
- Playing career: 2001–2013

Carlo Grünn (born April 30, 1981) is a Finnish former ice hockey player who last played professionally in France for Étoile Noire de Strasbourg of the French Ligue Magnus.

== Career statistics ==
			Regular season					Playoffs
Season	Team	League	GP	G	A	Pts	PIM	GP	G	A	Pts	PIM
1996–97	Kiekko-Vantaa U16	Jr. C SM-sarja	32	19	5	24	32	—	—	—	—	—
1998–99	HIFK U18	Jr. B SM-sarja	14	7	7	14	12	3	1	1	2	0
1998–99	HIFK U20	Jr. A SM-liiga	8	2	1	3	2	—	—	—	—	—
1999–00	HIFK U20	Jr. A SM-liiga	38	5	14	19	32	3	0	0	0	2
2000–01	HIFK U20	Jr. A SM-liiga	41	35	32	67	51	7	4	4	8	2
2000–01	HIFK	Liiga	3	0	0	0	0	4	0	0	0	0
2000–01	Ahmat Hyvinkää	Mestis	1	0	0	0	0	—	—	—	—	—
2001–02	HIFK U20	Jr. A SM-liiga	3	0	3	3	2	2	1	1	2	0
2001–02	HIFK	Liiga	48	5	4	9	4	—	—	—	—	—
2002–03	HIFK	Liiga	28	9	7	16	6	3	1	0	1	0
2003–04	HIFK	Liiga	28	0	2	2	4	—	—	—	—	—
2003–04	Lahti Pelicans	Liiga	3	0	0	0	0	—	—	—	—	—
2003–04	JYP Jyväskylä	Liiga	21	1	1	2	4	2	0	0	0	4
2004–05	JYP Jyväskylä	Liiga	56	6	6	12	32	3	0	0	0	0
2005–06	JYP Jyväskylä	Liiga	48	14	11	25	24	3	0	0	0	0
2006–07	JYP Jyväskylä	Liiga	27	2	11	13	8	—	—	—	—	—
2006–07	Espoo Blues	Liiga	6	0	0	0	2	1	0	0	0	0
2007–08	Espoo Blues	Liiga	33	3	3	6	22	—	—	—	—	—
2007–08	HPK	Liiga	10	1	3	4	6	—	—	—	—	—
2008–09	Jukurit	Mestis	17	4	5	9	6	—	—	—	—	—
2008–09	HC Sierre-Anniviers	NLB	6	3	2	5	8	—	—	—	—	—
2008–09	EC Dornbirn	Austria2	7	5	3	8	0	12	4	10	14	18
2009–10	Kiekko-Vantaa	Mestis	35	15	14	29	26	—	—	—	—	—
2009–10	SaiPa	Liiga	17	6	6	12	8	—	—	—	—	—
2010–11	SaiPa	Liiga	48	7	7	14	42	—	—	—	—	—
2011–12	ETC Crimmitschau	Germany2	48	20	20	40	46	—	—	—	—	—
2012–13	Étoile Noire de Strasbourg	France	19	7	4	11	8	6	2	0	2	2
Liiga totals			376	54	61	115	162	16	1	0	1	4
