= Tommi Kovanen =

Finnish ice hockey player

- Born: July 15, 1975 (age 49); Pieksämäki, Finland
- Height: 5 ft 10 in (178 cm)
- Weight: 176 lb (80 kg; 12 st 8 lb)
- Position: Defence
- Shot: Left
- SM-liiga team Former teams: Lukko; KalPa; Pelicans; JYP; HIFK; Jokerit; Tappara
- Playing career: 1993–2013

Tommi Kovanen (born July 15, 1975) is a Finnish former professional ice hockey defenceman.

== Career statistics ==
			Regular season					Playoffs
Season	Team	League	GP	G	A	Pts	PIM	GP	G	A	Pts	PIM
1992–93	KalPa U18	Jr. B SM-sarja	14	1	5	6	32	—	—	—	—	—
1992–93	KalPa U20	Jr. A I-Divisioona	9	1	2	3	0	—	—	—	—	—
1993–94	KalPa U20	Jr. A I-Divisioona	13	4	4	8	8	—	—	—	—	—
1993–94	KalPa	Liiga	1	0	0	0	2	—	—	—	—	—
1993–94	Junkkarit HT	I-Divisioona	2	0	0	0	0	—	—	—	—	—
1994–95	KalPa U20	Jr. A SM-liiga	18	3	5	8	48	—	—	—	—	—
1995–96	KalPa U20	Jr. A SM-liiga	20	6	13	19	45	7	1	4	5	6
1995–96	KalPa	Liiga	22	0	4	4	20	—	—	—	—	—
1996–97	KalPa	Liiga	32	0	5	5	0	—	—	—	—	—
1997–98	Lahti Pelicans	I-Divisioona	43	5	6	11	36	—	—	—	—	—
1998–99	Lahti Pelicans	I-Divisioona	38	3	6	9	28	—	—	—	—	—
1999–00	Lahti Pelicans	Liiga	46	2	3	5	26	—	—	—	—	—
1999–00	KooKoo	I-Divisioona	3	0	2	2	2	—	—	—	—	—
2000–01	Jukurit	Mestis	35	7	10	17	12	12	3	5	8	4
2001–02	HC Fassa	Italy	12	1	3	4	10	—	—	—	—	—
2001–02	Jukurit	Mestis	10	1	10	11	6	9	1	6	7	2
2002–03	Jukurit	Mestis	25	5	12	17	20	12	0	8	8	4
2003–04	JYP Jyväskylä	Liiga	38	4	8	12	22	—	—	—	—	—
2004–05	JYP Jyväskylä	Liiga	54	10	15	25	42	3	0	0	0	0
2005–06	JYP Jyväskylä	Liiga	56	4	16	20	82	3	0	1	1	6
2005–06	HC Fribourg-Gottéron	NLA	—	—	—	—	—	6	0	2	2	12
2006–07	JYP Jyväskylä	Liiga	17	2	2	4	58	—	—	—	—	—
2006–07	HIFK	Liiga	15	0	0	0	12	5	0	1	1	2
2007–08	HIFK	Liiga	50	1	15	16	44	7	1	0	1	2
2008–09	Lukko	Liiga	31	6	12	18	34	—	—	—	—	—
2009–10	Lukko	Liiga	50	9	21	30	78	3	0	0	0	2
2010–11	Jokerit	Liiga	17	2	9	11	16	—	—	—	—	—
2010–11	HIFK	Liiga	12	0	3	3	12	3	1	0	1	2
2010–11	Kiekko-Vantaa	Mestis	1	0	1	1	4	—	—	—	—	—
2011–12	Tappara	Liiga	23	1	5	6	12	—	—	—	—	—
2012–13	Lukko	Liiga	40	3	14	17	30	—	—	—	—	—
Liiga totals			504	44	132	176	490	42	4	6	10	26
