= 2019–20 Liiga season =

2019–20 SM-liiga
- League: SM-liiga
- Sport: Ice hockey
- Duration: September 2019 – March 2020
- Teams: 15
- TV partner: Telia

Regular season
- Best record: Kärpät
- Runners-up: Lukko
- Top scorer: Justin Danforth (Lukko)

Playoffs

SM-liiga seasons
- ← 2018–19 2020–21 →

The 2019–20 SM-liiga season was the 45th season of the SM-liiga, the top level of ice hockey in Finland, since the league's formation in 1975. The last two game days (12 and 14 March 2020) of the regular season were scheduled to be played in front of an empty arena due to the Finnish government advising that all public events with more than 500 attendees would be cancelled or postponed. On 13 March, the rest of the season, which included the final round of the regular season and all of playoffs, was cancelled due to the COVID-19 pandemic.

The Finnish championship was not awarded for the first time since 1944 when the 1943–44 SM-sarja season was cancelled due to the Continuation War.

== Teams ==
Location of teams in 2019–2020 SM-liiga

Team	City	Head coach	Arena	Capacity	Captain
HIFK	Helsinki	Jarno Pikkarainen	Helsingin jäähalli	8,200	~~Lennart Petrell~~14 Nov 2019; Jere Sallinen
HPK	Hämeenlinna	Antti Pennanen	Patria-areena	5,360	Niklas Friman
Ilves	Tampere	~~Karri Kivi~~30 Sep 2019; Jouko Myrrä	Tampereen jäähalli	7,300	Eemeli Suomi
Jukurit	Mikkeli	~~Pekka Kangasalusta~~6 Jan 2020; Marko Kauppinen	Kalevankankaan jäähalli	4,200	Miika Roine
JYP	Jyväskylä	Pekka Tirkkonen	Synergia-areena	4,437	Juuso Vainio
KalPa	Kuopio	Tommi Miettinen	Niiralan monttu	5,300	Tommi Jokinen
KooKoo	Kouvola	Jussi Ahokas	Lumon arena	6,000	Alexander Bonsaksen
Kärpät	Oulu	Mikko Manner	Oulun Energia Areena	6,614	Lasse Kukkonen
Lukko	Rauma	Pekka Virta	Äijänsuo Arena	5,000	Tapio Laakso
Pelicans	Lahti	~~Ville Nieminen~~30 Nov 2019; Jesse Welling	Isku Areena	5,371	Hannes Björninen
SaiPa	Lappeenranta	Tero Lehterä	Kisapuisto	4,820	Elmeri Kaksonen
Sport	Vaasa	~~Ari-Pekka Pajuluoma~~23 Nov 2019; Risto Dufva	Vaasa Arena	4,164	Erik Riska
Tappara	Tampere	Jukka Rautakorpi	Tampereen jäähalli	7,300	Kristian Kuusela
TPS	Turku	~~Kalle Kaskinen~~1 Nov 2019; Marko Virtanen	HK Arena	11,820	Lauri Korpikoski
Ässät	Pori	Ari-Pekka Selin	Porin jäähalli	6,350	Niklas Appelgren

== Regular season ==
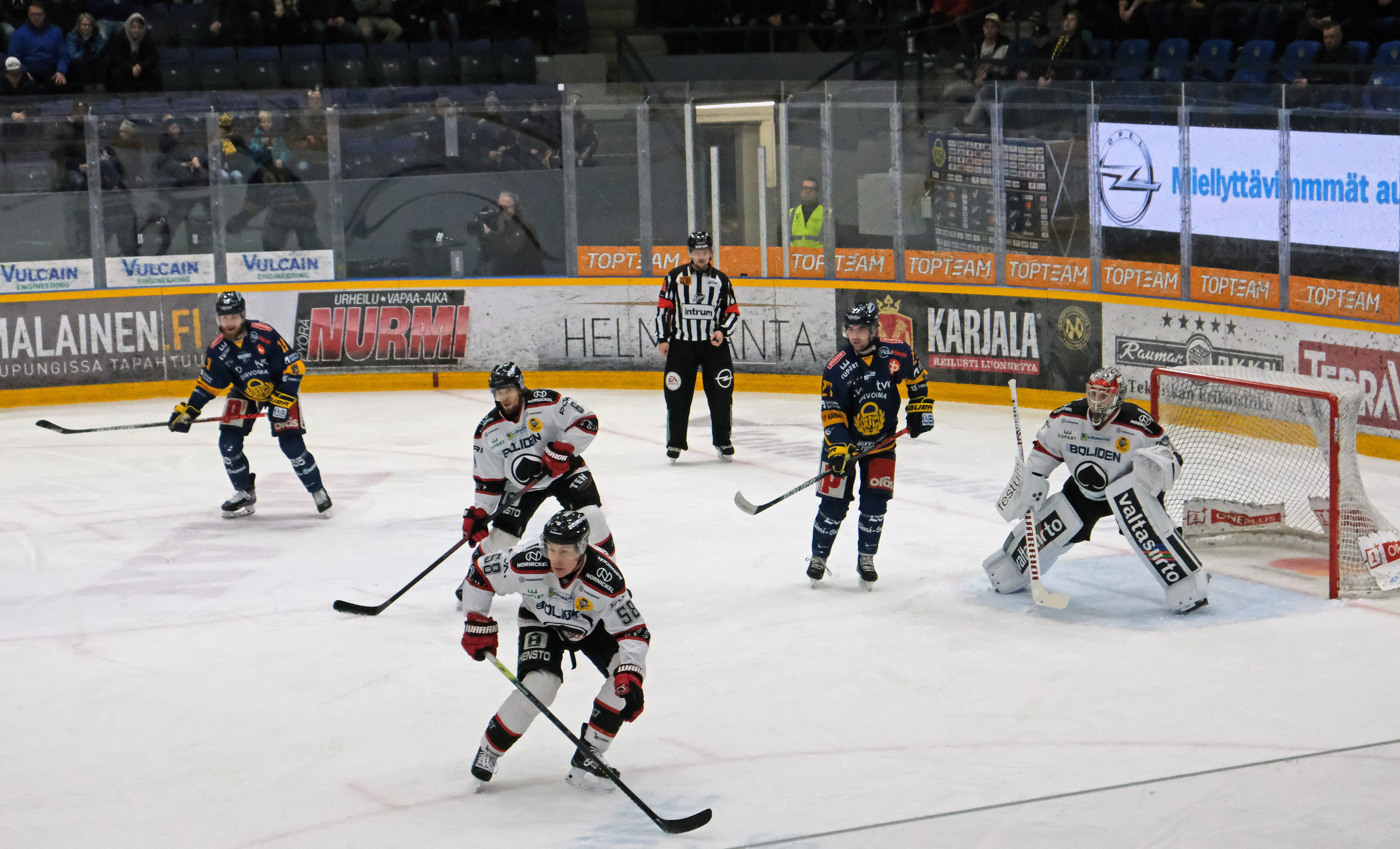
Lukko - Ässät 30.11.2019

Usually the top six advance straight to quarter-finals, while teams between 7th and 10th positions play wild card round for the final two spots. However, due to the COVID-19 pandemic, the last game day of the season was not played and no playoffs were held. The top 4 teams of the unfinished regular season qualified for the Champions Hockey League and the 5th team to the Spengler Cup. The SM-liiga is a closed series and thus there is no relegation.

Pos	Team	Pld	W	OTW	OTL	L	GF	GA	GD	Pts	Final Result
1	Kärpät	59	36	7	5	11	185	114	+71	127	Qualify for 2020–21 Champions Hockey League
2	Lukko	59	32	8	6	13	190	121	+69	118 (Note: Due to the regular season being cut short, the ranking of the regular season is based on point average.)	Qualify for 2020–21 Champions Hockey League
3	Tappara	60	30	11	7	12	188	128	+60	119	Qualify for 2020–21 Champions Hockey League
4	Ilves	59	32	6	6	15	182	133	+49	114	Qualify for 2020–21 Champions Hockey League
5	KooKoo	59	30	7	6	16	172	129	+43	110	Qualify for 2020 Spengler Cup
6	HIFK	59	26	8	9	16	174	143	+31	103	
7	HPK	59	27	7	7	18	157	147	+10	102	
8	JYP	59	25	6	4	24	177	159	+18	91	
9	Ässät	59	20	4	8	27	141	170	−29	76	
10	KalPa	59	19	5	8	27	156	186	−30	75	
11	TPS	59	17	5	8	29	149	185	−36	69	
12	SaiPa	59	18	4	4	33	123	185	−62	66	
13	Jukurit	59	11	8	7	33	127	178	−51	56	
14	Pelicans	59	12	7	4	36	120	201	−81	54	
15	Sport	59	11	4	8	36	129	191	−62	49	

Source: Liiga
Notes:

Rules for classification: 1) Points; 2) 3-point wins 3) Goal difference; 4) Goals scored; 4) Head-to-head points.

=== Scoring leaders ===
The following players led the league in regular season points.

Player	Team	GP	G	A	Pts	+/–	PIM
Justin Danforth	Lukko	56	27	33	60	+26	26
Eemeli Suomi	Ilves Tampere	57	26	31	57	+23	42
Julius Nattinen	JYP	54	33	22	55	+19	22
Jesse Puljujarvi	Karpat	56	24	29	53	+30	52
Kristian Kuusela	Tappara	55	20	33	53	+19	16

== See also ==
- 2019–20 Mestis season
