= Pentti Nöyränen =

Finnish ice hockey player

- Born: May 20, 1983 (age 41); Espoo, Finland
- Height: 5 ft 10 in (178 cm)
- Weight: 179 lb (81 kg; 12 st 11 lb)
- Position: Right wing
- Shot: Left
- Played for: HC Salamat; Espoo Blues; Kiekko-Vantaa; HPK; SaPKo; SaiPa; Kotkan Titaanit; Mikkelin Jukurit; Kiekkohait
- Playing career: 2004–2016

Pentti Nöyränen (born May 20, 1983) is a Finnish former ice hockey player who played professionally in Finland for Espoo Blues of the SM-liiga.

== Career statistics ==
| | | | Regular season | | | | | Playoffs |
| Season | Team | League | GP | G | A | Pts | PIM | GP | G | A | Pts | PIM |
|---|---|---|---|---|---|---|---|---|---|---|---|---|
| 1998–99 | Espoo Blues U16 | U16 SM-sarja | 10 | 6 | 5 | 11 | 8 | — | — | — | — | — |
| 1998–99 | Espoo Blues U18 | U18 SM-sarja | 2 | 0 | 0 | 0 | 0 | — | — | — | — | — |
| 1999–00 | Espoo Blues U18 | U18 SM-sarja | 14 | 4 | 0 | 4 | 0 | — | — | — | — | — |
| 2000–01 | Espoo Blues U18 | U18 SM-sarja | 33 | 19 | 11 | 30 | 34 | — | — | — | — | — |
| 2000–01 | Espoo Blues U20 | U20 SM-liiga | 11 | 0 | 2 | 2 | 6 | — | — | — | — | — |
| 2001–02 | Espoo Blues U20 | U20 SM-liiga | 41 | 5 | 9 | 14 | 12 | 2 | 0 | 0 | 0 | 0 |
| 2002–03 | Espoo Blues U20 | U20 SM-liiga | 36 | 4 | 7 | 11 | 20 | 10 | 1 | 2 | 3 | 0 |
| 2003–04 | Espoo Blues U20 | U20 SM-liiga | 36 | 8 | 8 | 16 | 22 | 5 | 2 | 1 | 3 | 0 |
| 2004–05 | HC Salamat | Mestis | 44 | 9 | 6 | 15 | 24 | 3 | 0 | 0 | 0 | 0 |
| 2005–06 | Espoo Blues | SM-liiga | 48 | 0 | 2 | 2 | 16 | 9 | 0 | 0 | 0 | 2 |
| 2006–07 | Espoo Blues | SM-liiga | 34 | 1 | 3 | 4 | 10 | — | — | — | — | — |
| 2007–08 | Espoo Blues | SM-liiga | 19 | 0 | 0 | 0 | 10 | — | — | — | — | — |
| 2007–08 | HC Salamat | Mestis | 5 | 0 | 0 | 0 | 2 | — | — | — | — | — |
| 2007–08 | Kiekko-Vantaa | Mestis | 11 | 2 | 4 | 6 | 18 | — | — | — | — | — |
| 2007–08 | HPK | SM-liiga | 14 | 0 | 3 | 3 | 2 | — | — | — | — | — |
| 2008–09 | SaPKo | Mestis | 21 | 3 | 4 | 7 | 10 | — | — | — | — | — |
| 2008–09 | SaiPa | SM-liiga | 30 | 5 | 2 | 7 | 18 | — | — | — | — | — |
| 2008–09 | Kotkan Titaanit | Mestis | 1 | 0 | 0 | 0 | 0 | — | — | — | — | — |
| 2009–10 | SaiPa | SM-liiga | 49 | 6 | 8 | 14 | 30 | — | — | — | — | — |
| 2010–11 | Espoo Blues | SM-liiga | 31 | 0 | 5 | 5 | 12 | 11 | 0 | 0 | 0 | 4 |
| 2010–11 | Kiekko-Vantaa | Mestis | 1 | 0 | 0 | 0 | 0 | — | — | — | — | — |
| 2010–11 | Jukurit | Mestis | 1 | 0 | 0 | 0 | 0 | — | — | — | — | — |
| 2011–12 | Kiekkohait | Suomi-sarja | 7 | 3 | 3 | 6 | 12 | — | — | — | — | — |
| 2011–12 | Jukurit | Mestis | 26 | 1 | 6 | 7 | 14 | 9 | 2 | 0 | 2 | 10 |
| 2012–13 | Jukurit | Mestis | 44 | 7 | 7 | 14 | 20 | 10 | 3 | 2 | 5 | 8 |
| 2013–14 | Jukurit | Mestis | 52 | 11 | 6 | 17 | 44 | 19 | 6 | 7 | 13 | 14 |
| 2014–15 | Jukurit | Mestis | 46 | 5 | 8 | 13 | 26 | 4 | 0 | 0 | 0 | 2 |
| 2015–16 | Jukurit | Mestis | 43 | 3 | 7 | 10 | 14 | 16 | 0 | 0 | 0 | 10 |
| Liiga totals | | | 225 | 12 | 23 | 35 | 98 | 20 | 0 | 0 | 0 | 6 |
| Mestis totals | | | 295 | 41 | 48 | 89 | 172 | 61 | 11 | 9 | 20 | 44 |
