= Stefan Öhman =

Swedish-Finnish ice hockey player and coach

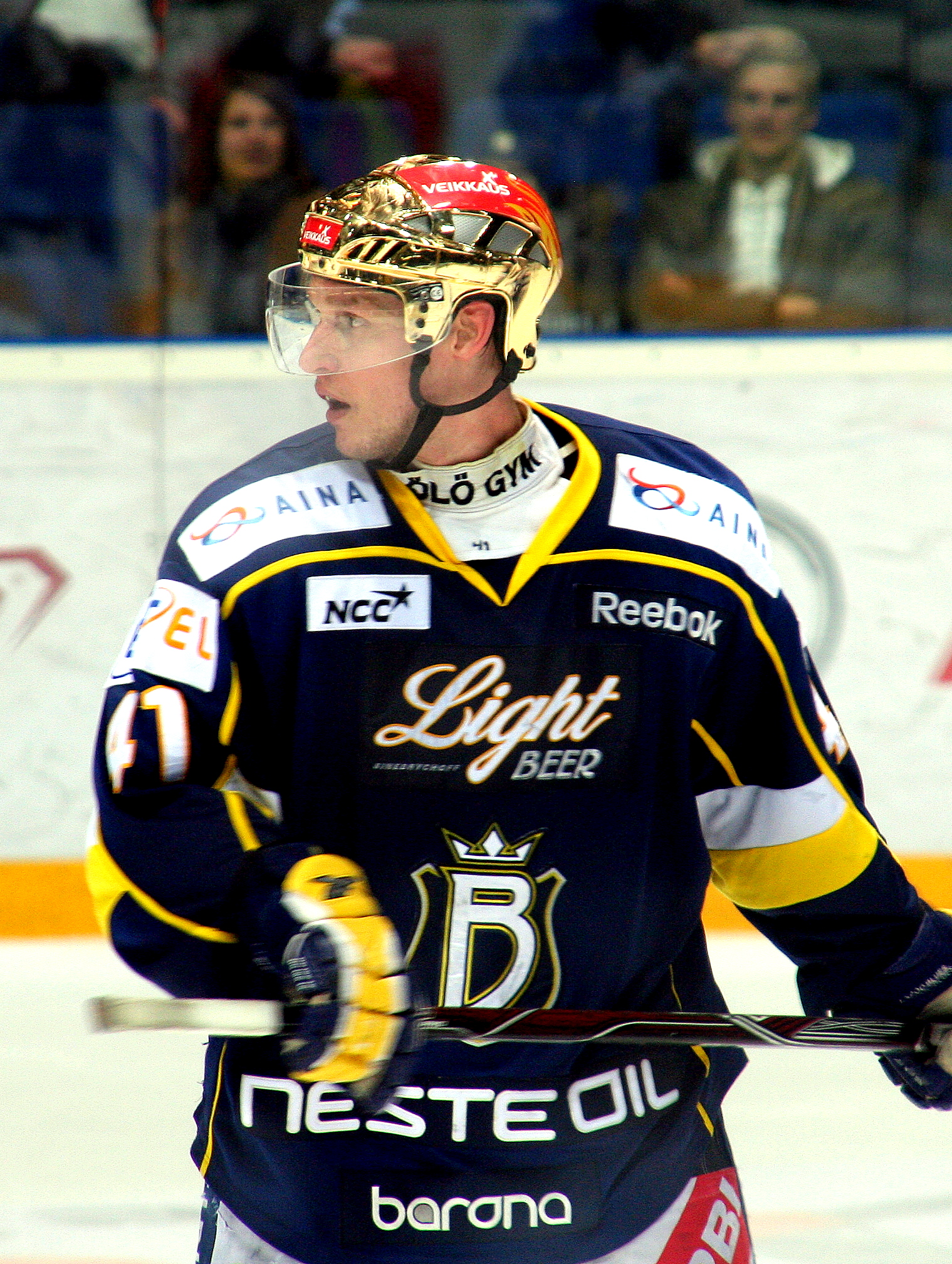
- Born: 5 May 1976 (age 50) Örnsköldsvik, Sweden
- Height: 5 ft 11 in (180 cm)
- Weight: 198 lb (90 kg; 14 st 2 lb)
- Position: Center
- Shot: Left
- Played for: Modo Hockey; IF Björklöven; Tappara; Espoo Blues
- Playing career: 1995–2017

Stefan Öhman (born 5 May 1976) is a Swedish-Finnish ice hockey coach and former professional forward. He spent several years in the Finnish SM-liiga, playing for Tappara and Espoo Blues. He also played for Björklöven and Modo Hockey in the Swedish Elitserien and for IK Oskarshamn in the HockeyAllsvenskan.

== Personal life ==
Öhman received Finnish citizenship during his years in SM-liiga, and has children with his Finnish wife, Katja.

== Career statistics ==
			Regular season					Playoffs
Season	Team	League	GP	G	A	Pts	PIM	GP	G	A	Pts	PIM
1991–92	Modo Hockey U16		—	—	—	—	—	—	—	—	—	—
1991–92	Modo Hockey J18	J18 Div. 1	—	—	—	—	—	—	—	—	—	—
1992–93	Modo Hockey J18	J18 Div. 1	—	—	—	—	—	—	—	—	—	—
1992–93	Modo Hockey J20	Juniorallsvenskan	10	0	1	1	4	—	—	—	—	—
1993–94	Modo Hockey J18	J18 Div. 1	—	—	—	—	—	—	—	—	—	—
1993–94	Modo Hockey J20	Juniorallsvenskan	9	6	7	13	0	—	—	—	—	—
1994–95	Modo Hockey J20	J20 SuperElit	29	15	20	35	36	—	—	—	—	—
1995–96	IF Björklöven J20	J20 SuperElit	2	0	3	3	0	—	—	—	—	—
1995–96	IF Björklöven	Allsvenskan Division 1	18	6	9	15	8	—	—	—	—	—
1995–96	IF Björklöven	Division 1	18	6	15	21	10	—	—	—	—	—
1996–97	Modo Hockey J20	J20 SuperElit	1	0	1	1	—	—	—	—	—	—
1996–97	Modo Hockey	Elitserien	47	0	5	5	12	—	—	—	—	—
1997–98	IF Björklöven	Division 1	32	8	20	28	24	14	12	6	18	6
1998–99	IF Björklöven	Elitserien	41	7	10	17	18	—	—	—	—	—
1999–00	Modo Hockey	Elitserien	47	5	2	7	16	12	2	0	2	2
2000–01	Modo Hockey	Elitserien	46	4	6	10	34	6	0	0	0	2
2001–02	Modo Hockey	Elitserien	48	11	14	25	16	12	2	5	7	0
2002–03	Modo Hockey	Elitserien	49	8	20	28	36	6	1	1	2	4
2003–04	Tappara	SM-liiga	46	14	15	29	24	2	0	0	0	0
2004–05	Tappara	SM-liiga	56	17	24	41	22	8	1	1	2	0
2005–06	Tappara	SM-liiga	55	15	4	19	24	6	1	4	5	4
2006–07	Tappara	SM-liiga	54	22	23	45	47	5	0	0	0	0
2007–08	Espoo Blues	SM-liiga	50	12	27	39	26	6	1	1	2	0
2008–09	Espoo Blues	SM-liiga	43	7	24	31	30	13	2	4	6	4
2009–10	Espoo Blues	SM-liiga	57	11	27	38	20	3	1	2	3	0
2010–11	Espoo Blues	SM-liiga	58	6	16	22	28	18	2	6	8	8
2011–12	IK Oskarshamn	HockeyAllsvenskan	17	3	10	13	6	6	0	2	2	2
2012–13	IK Oskarshamn	HockeyAllsvenskan	51	12	15	27	16	6	3	1	4	0
2013–14	IF Björklöven	HockeyAllsvenskan	44	16	25	41	14	—	—	—	—	—
2014–15	IF Björklöven	HockeyAllsvenskan	51	19	22	41	22	5	2	2	4	0
2015–16	IF Björklöven	HockeyAllsvenskan	50	7	12	19	16	—	—	—	—	—
2016–17	IF Björklöven	HockeyAllsvenskan	44	4	10	14	12	—	—	—	—	—
Elitserien totals			278	35	57	92	132	46	7	8	15	12
SM-liiga totals			419	104	160	264	221	61	8	18	26	16
HockeyAllsvenskan totals			257	61	94	155	86	17	5	5	10	2
