= Jesper Piitulainen =

Finnish ice hockey player

- Born: 13 August 1991 (age 34) Savonlinna, Finland
- Height: 172 cm (5 ft 8 in)
- Weight: 78 kg (172 lb; 12 st 4 lb)
- Position: Forward
- Shoots: Right
- Liiga team Former teams: Mikkelin Jukurit; SaiPa; Lukko
- Playing career: 2010–present

Jesper Piitulainen (born 13 August 1991) is a Finnish ice hockey forward currently playing for Mikkelin Jukurit of the Finnish Liiga.

== Career statistics ==
			Regular season					Playoffs
Season	Team	League	GP	G	A	Pts	PIM	GP	G	A	Pts	PIM
2007–08	SaPKo U20	U20 II-divisioona	2	3	0	3	2	—	—	—	—	—
2008–09	SaPKo U20	U20 II-divisioona	15	10	23	33	6	—	—	—	—	—
2009–10	SaPKo U20	U20 I-divisioona Q	5	7	5	12	0	—	—	—	—	—
2009–10	SaPKo U20	U20 II-divisioona	7	4	9	13	2	2	4	1	5	2
2009–10	SaPKo	Mestis	41	6	16	22	6	—	—	—	—	—
2010–11	SaPKo U20	U20 I-divisioona Q	1	0	1	1	0	—	—	—	—	—
2010–11	SaPKo	Mestis	47	9	27	36	12	4	1	2	3	0
2010–11	Suomi U20	Mestis	3	0	3	3	0	—	—	—	—	—
2011–12	Mikkelin Jukurit	Mestis	46	16	26	42	33	9	3	6	9	0
2012–13	SaiPa	SM-liiga	37	7	8	15	4	—	—	—	—	—
2012–13	Kiekko-Vantaa	Mestis	1	0	0	0	0	—	—	—	—	—
2012–13	Mikkelin Jukurit	Mestis	6	1	2	3	0	—	—	—	—	—
2013–14	SaiPa	Liiga	40	11	10	21	2	10	0	0	0	12
2014–15	Lukko	Liiga	57	4	5	9	6	14	0	1	1	2
2014–15	KeuPa HT	Mestis	2	1	0	1	0	—	—	—	—	—
2015–16	Lukko	Liiga	60	9	11	20	2	4	0	0	0	4
2016–17	Mikkelin Jukurit	Liiga	50	4	13	17	8	—	—	—	—	—
2017–18	Mikkelin Jukurit	Liiga	59	10	20	30	8	—	—	—	—	—
2018–19	Mikkelin Jukurit	Liiga	59	12	16	28	10	—	—	—	—	—
2019–20	Mikkelin Jukurit	Liiga	44	12	16	28	2	—	—	—	—	—
2020–21	Mikkelin Jukurit	Liiga	46	11	13	24	2	—	—	—	—	—
2021–22	Mikkelin Jukurit	Liiga	41	3	7	10	6	6	0	0	0	0
2022–23	Mikkelin Jukurit	Liiga	60	11	13	24	6	—	—	—	—	—
2023–24	Mikkelin Jukurit	Liiga	49	6	8	14	6	6	1	1	2	2
2024–25	Mikkelin Jukurit	Liiga	50	15	18	33	12	5	1	5	6	0
2025–26	Mikkelin Jukurit	Liiga	58	13	20	33	8	—	—	—	—	—
Liiga (SM-liiga) totals			710	128	178	306	82	45	2	7	9	20
