= Ville Hyvärinen =

Finnish ice hockey player

- Born: 6 June 1991 (age 33); Kuopio, Finland
- Height: 190 cm (6 ft 3 in)
- Weight: 95 kg (209 lb; 14 st 13 lb)
- Position: Defenceman
- Shot: Left
- Played for: KalPa; Lukko; Mikkelin Jukurit
- Playing career: 2009–2023

Ville Hyvärinen (born 6 June 1991) is a Finnish former ice hockey defenceman who played for Mikkelin Jukurit of the Finnish Liiga.
