= Kovanen =

Kovanen is a Finnish surname. Notable people with the surname include:

- Jalmari Kovanen (1877–1936), Finnish farmer and politician
- Tauno Kovanen (1917–1986), Finnish wrestler
- Tommi Kovanen (born 1975), Finnish ice hockey defenceman
