= Ilkka Vaarasuo =

Finnish ice hockey defenceman

- Born: January 25, 1983 (age 42); Iisalmi, Finland
- Height: 6 ft 2 in (188 cm)
- Weight: 198 lb (90 kg; 14 st 2 lb)
- Position: Defence
- Shot: Left
- Played for: JYP; HIFK
- Playing career: 2002–2017

Ilkka Vaarasuo (born January 25, 1983) is a Finnish former professional ice hockey defenceman.

== Career ==
Vaarasuo began his career with JYP, making his debut for the senior team during the 2002–03 SM-liiga season. With JYP, Vaarasuo won the Kanada-malja in 2009. The following season, he joined Jukurit of Mestis, where he spent the next seven seasons, during which he had two loan spells with HIFK. He played two games for HIFK during the 2011–12 season and fifteen games during the 2012–13 season. He won two Mestis championships with Jukurit in 2015 and 2016.

Jukurit was promoted to Liiga for the 2016–17 season but Vaarasuo spent the season on loan in Mestis with his hometown team, Iisalmen Peli-Karhut, where he served as team captain in his final season before retiring. After ending his playing career, Vaarasuo returned to Jukurit to become team manager for their Jr. A U20 team.
