= Theodor Johnsson =

Swedish ice hockey player

- Born: 6 February 2003 (age 22); Helsingborg, Sweden
- Height: 6 ft 1 in (185 cm)
- Weight: 187 lb (85 kg; 13 st 5 lb)
- Position: Defence
- Shoots: Right
- Liiga team Former teams: Vaasan Sport; Växjö Lakers; Malmö Redhawks
- Playing career: 2021–present

Theodor Johnsson (born 6 February 2003) is a Swedish professional ice hockey defenceman who currently plays with Vaasan Sport in the Finnish Liiga. He spent his junior years in the Växjö Lakers organization, where he also made his SHL debut.

On 9 May 2022, Johnsson left Växjö to sign a one-year contract with fellow SHL club, Malmö Redhawks. In 2023 Johnsson went abroad, now playing with Vaasan Sport in Finland.

== Career statistics ==
			Regular season					Playoffs
Season	Team	League	GP	G	A	Pts	PIM	GP	G	A	Pts	PIM
2019–20	Växjö Lakers	J20	7	0	1	1	0	—	—	—	—	—
2020–21	Växjö Lakers	J20	15	0	1	1	4	—	—	—	—	—
2021–22	Växjö Lakers	J20	41	11	12	23	16	3	0	0	0	2
2021–22	Växjö Lakers	SHL	18	0	0	0	2	4	0	0	0	0
2022–23	Malmö Redhawks	J20	21	2	9	11	10	—	—	—	—	—
2022–23	Malmö Redhawks	SHL	35	2	1	3	0	—	—	—	—	—
2023–24	Vaasan Sport	Liiga	58	3	4	7	31	2	0	0	0	2
SHL totals			53	2	1	3	2	4	0	0	0	0
