= Marko Kauppinen =

Finnish ice hockey player

- Born: 23 March 1979 (age 47) Mikkeli, Finland
- Height: 5 ft 11 in (180 cm)
- Weight: 185 lb (84 kg; 13 st 3 lb)
- Position: Defence
- Shot: Left
- Played for: JYP; Jokerit; AIK IF; TPS; Mora IK; Tappara; KalPa; Modo Hockey; Jukurit
- NHL draft: 214th overall, 1997; Philadelphia Flyers
- Playing career: 1997–2017

Marko Kauppinen (born 23 March 1979) is a Finnish former professional ice hockey defenceman who played in the Liiga and Swedish Hockey League (SHL). Kauppinen was selected by the Philadelphia Flyers in the 8th round (214th overall) of the 1997 NHL entry draft. On 3 September 2014, Kauppinen left the Finnish Liiga and signed a one-year contract with Swedish club, Modo Hockey in the SHL.
