= Mikko Strömberg =

Finnish ice hockey goaltender

- Born: March 5, 1979 (age 47) Helsinki, Finland
- Height: 6 ft 1 in (185 cm)
- Weight: 185 lb (84 kg; 13 st 3 lb)
- Position: Goaltender
- Caught: Left
- Played for: HIFK; Jukurit; SaiPa; Kärpät; Blues; HPK; Jokerit; HC Pustertal
- NHL draft: Undrafted
- Playing career: 1999–2012

Mikko Strömberg (born March 5, 1979) is a Finnish former professional ice hockey goaltender. He last played with the HC Val Pusteria Wolves in Serie A during the 2011–12 season.
