= Miika Roine =

Finnish ice hockey player

- Born: December 8, 1991 (age 33); Jyväskylä, Finland
- Height: 5 ft 11 in (180 cm)
- Weight: 176 lb (80 kg; 12 st 8 lb)
- Position: Forward
- Shoots: Left
- SM-liiga team: Mikkelin Jukurit
- NHL draft: Undrafted
- Playing career: 2011–present

Miika Roine (born December 8, 1991) is a Finnish professional ice hockey player. He is currently playing for Jukurit of the SM-liiga.

Roine made his SM-liiga debut playing with JYP Jyväskylä during the 2011–12 SM-liiga season.
