= Erik Riska =

Finnish ice hockey player

- Born: 16 May 1989 (age 35); Jakobstad, Finland
- Height: 188 cm (6 ft 2 in)
- Weight: 92 kg (203 lb; 14 st 7 lb)
- Position: Forward
- Shot: Left
- Liiga team Former teams: Vaasan Sport; Lukko
- Playing career: 2009–2024

Erik Riska (born 16 May 1989) is a Finnish former ice hockey forward. He retired in 2024 after multiple years at Vaasan Sport of the Finnish Liiga.
