= Let's Go Areena =

Indoor arena in Mikkeli, Finland

Kalevankankaan jäähalli
- Let's Go Areena
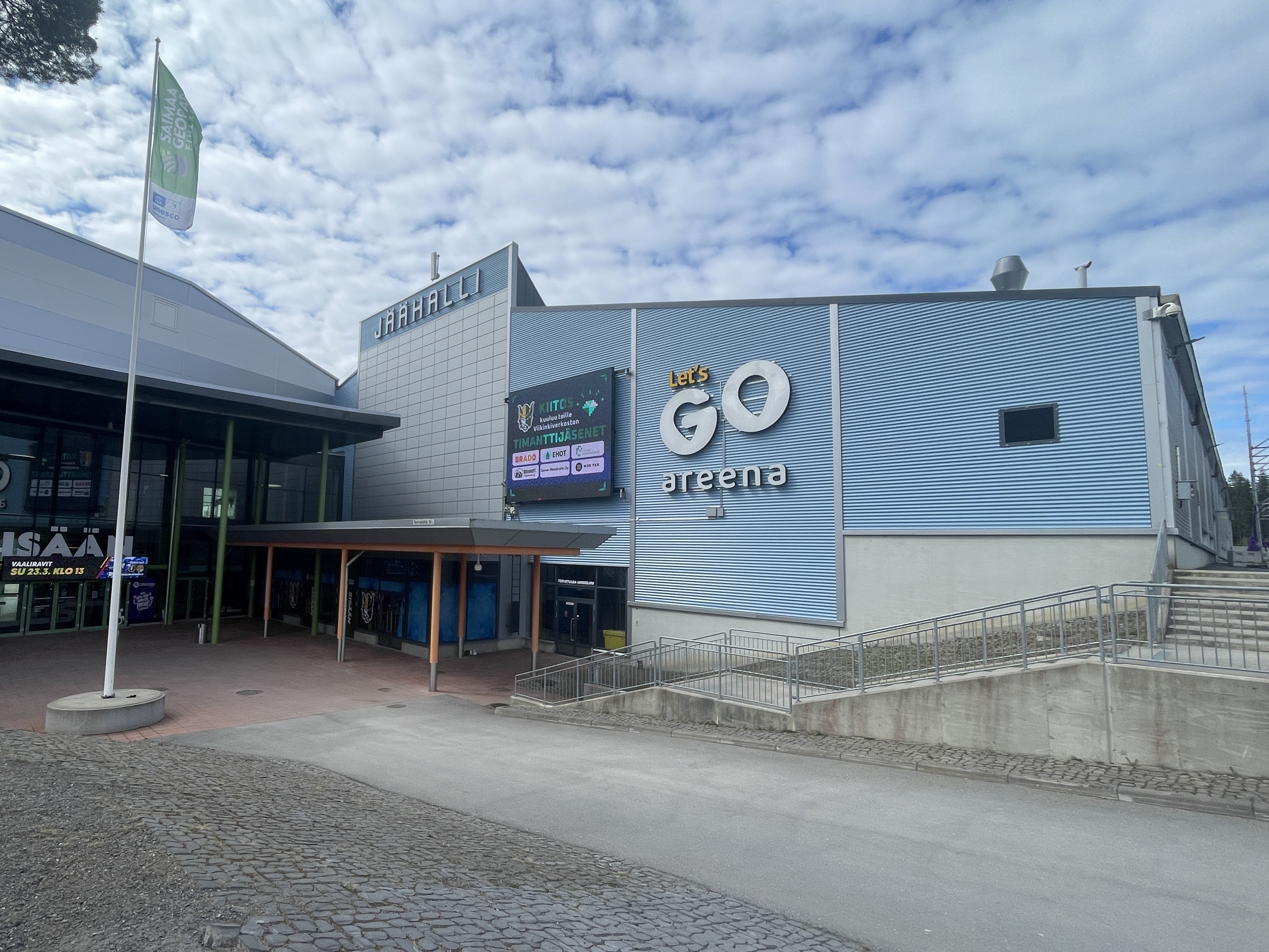
- Interactive map of Kalevankankaan jäähalli
- Location: Raviradantie 24, Mikkeli Finland
- Coordinates: 61.7050000°N 027.2430694°E
- Capacity: 4200 (ice hockey)

Construction
- Opened: 1982
- Renovated: 2013, 2016

Tenant
- Jukurit

Kalevankankaan jäähalli, also known as Let's Go Areena for sponsorship reasons, is a multipurpose indoor arena located in the Kalevankangas neighborhood in Mikkeli, Finland used most importantly for ice sports. The arena opened in 1982 and is the home arena of the Liiga team Jukurit, as well as the figure skating club Mikkelin Luistelijat. Since 2016 the arena was known with its sponsorship name Ikioma Areena, named after a local health care provider, and since 2024 as Let's Go Areena after a taxi company.

The site served as a location of ice hockey as an open air rink before the arena was built. In 2000 a practice rink was opened next to the arena. These two are the only indoor ice rinks in Mikkeli.

The original capacity of the arena was 5900 spectators but with the addition of seats, suites, and restaurants through the years the current capacity is 4200 out of which 2600 are seats and 1600 standing space. The attendance record for ice hockey is 4357, achieved in 2002.

The arena underwent a major renovation in 2011-13 when suites, restaurants, and an extended entrance area were added together with completely new dressing room areas. Some of the dressing rooms dated to the open air rink times and were completely outdated.

In 2016, when Jukurit were granted a licence to Liiga, the arena was updated to match the required standards.

The arena is part of the city's largest sport area which includes a multipurpose indoor arena Saimaa Stadiumi, a horse racing track Mikkelin Ravirata, a practice rink for ice sports, several football fields, tennis courts, badminton halls, a dog training area, and several kilometers of running and cross-country skiing tracks.

In addition to sport events; concerts, exhibitions, trade shows, and conventions have been staged in the arena.

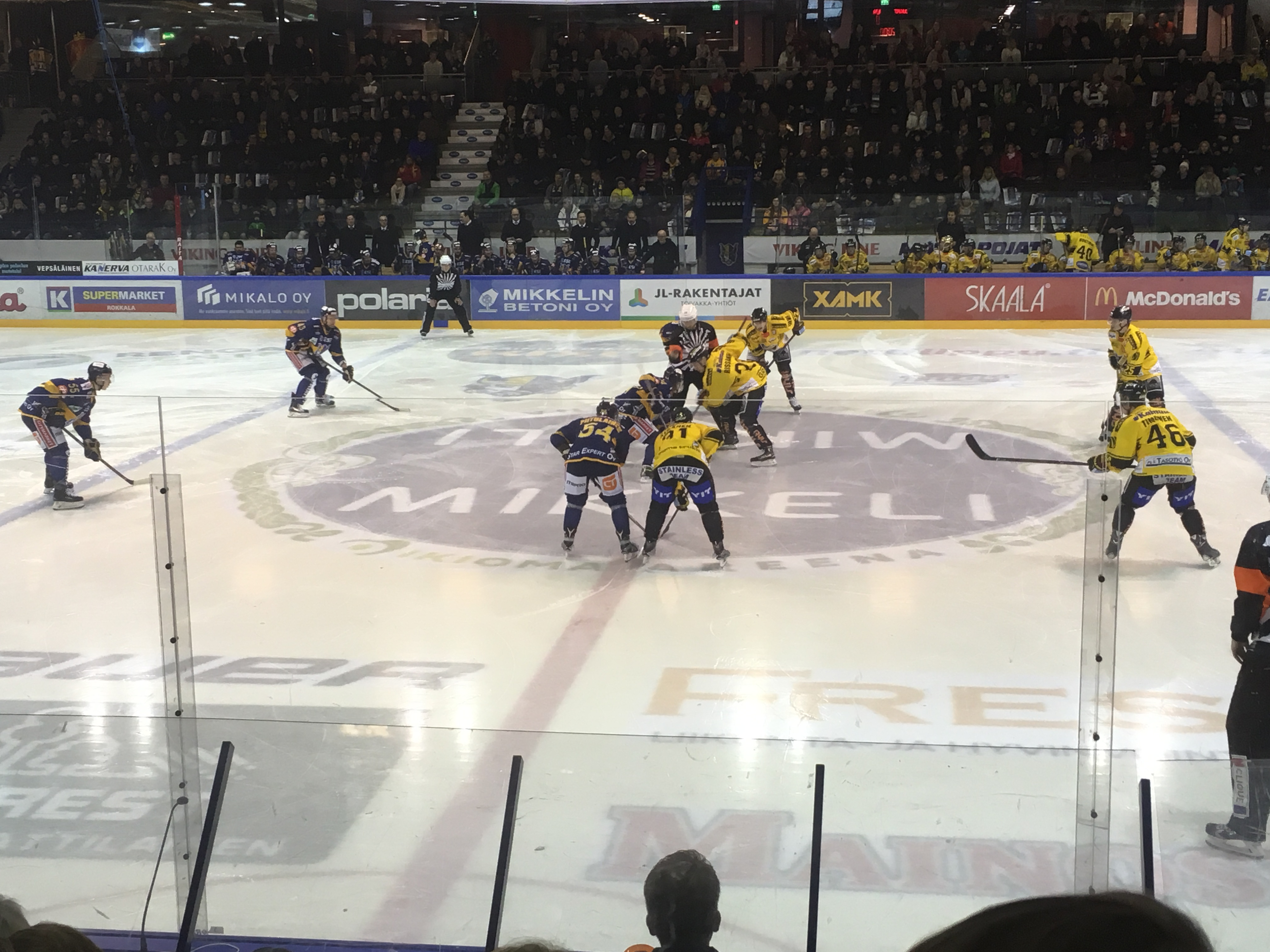
Puck drop at Jukurit-Kalpa game on December 26th 2016.

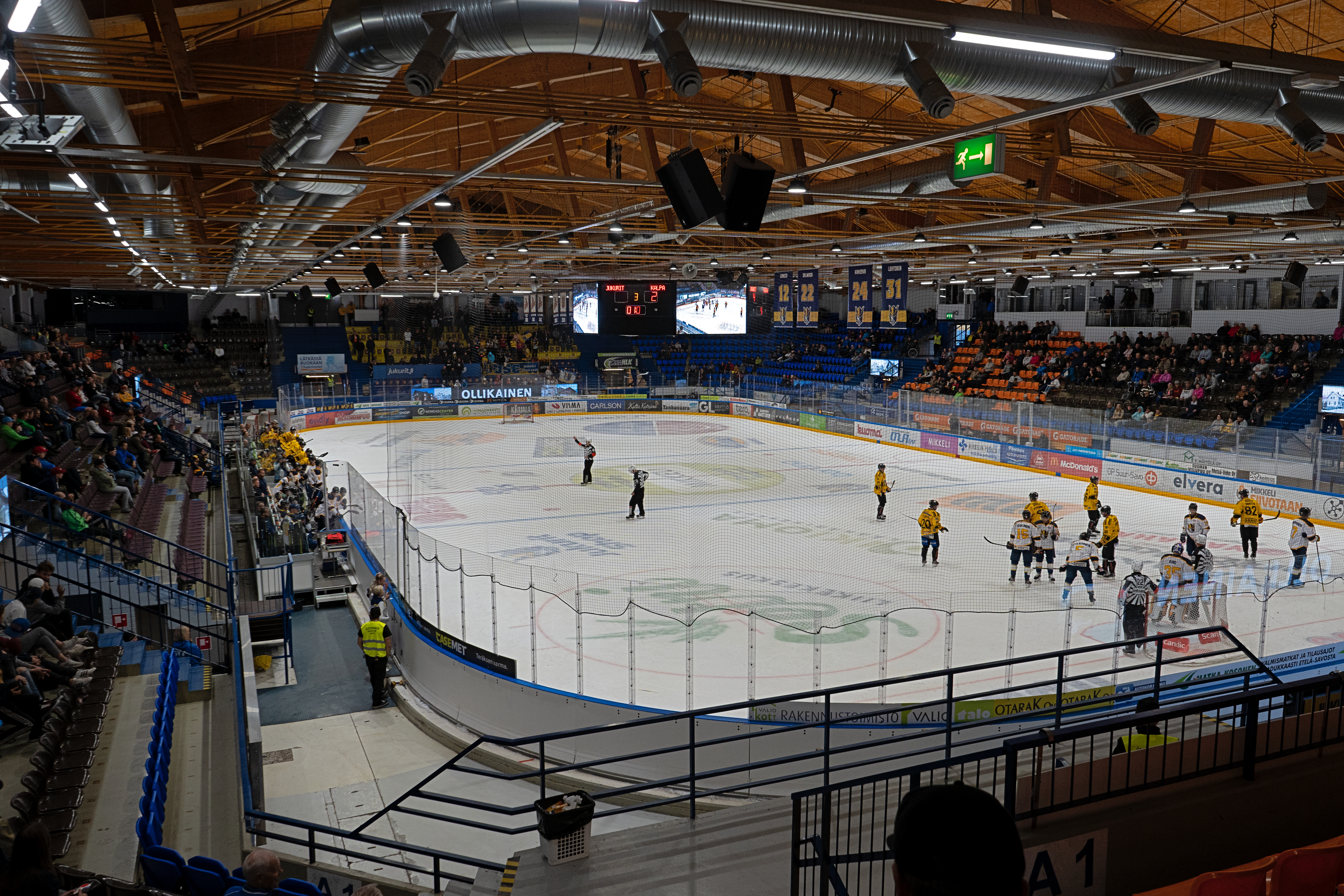
The arena from the inside in 2019.
