= 2001–02 Mestis season =

2001–02 Mestis
- League: Mestis
- Sport: Ice hockey
- Duration: September 2001 – April 2002
- Number of teams: 12

Regular season
- Best record: Jukurit
- Runners-up: KooKoo
- Relegated to Suomi-sarja: Diskos

Playoffs
- Finals champions: Jukurit
- Runners-up: KooKoo

Mestis seasons
- ← 2000–01 2002–03 →

The 2001–02 Mestis season was the second season of the Mestis, the second level of ice hockey in Finland. 12 teams participated in the league, and Jukurit won the championship.

== Standings ==
Rank	Team	GP	W	OTW	T	OTL	L	GF	GA	Diff	Pts
1.	Jukurit	44	26	4	5	1	8	185	114	+71	66
2.	KooKoo	44	25	1	5	1	12	172	124	+48	58
3.	Kiekko-Vantaa	44	25	1	2	2	14	156	122	+34	56
4.	Sport	44	23	1	7	0	13	154	106	+48	55
5.	TUTO Hockey	44	21	0	5	2	16	172	137	+35	49
6.	KalPa	44	17	2	7	1	17	154	130	+24	46
7.	FPS	44	20	0	3	2	19	152	172	−20	45
8.	Hermes	44	19	1	3	1	20	152	149	+3	44
9.	Haukat	44	15	0	9	0	20	149	161	−12	39
10.	Ahmat	44	17	0	3	1	23	138	166	−28	38
11.	UJK	44	11	2	5	0	26	116	170	−54	31
12.	Diskos	44	6	0	0	1	37	95	244	−149	13

== Playoffs ==
Quarterfinals
1	Jukurit	3
8	Hermes	0
2	KooKoo	3
7	FPS	2
3	Kiekko-Vantaa	2
6	KalPa	3
4	Sport	3
5	TUTO Hockey	1

Semifinals
1	Jukurit	3
6	KalPa	0
2	KooKoo	3
4	Sport	2

Finals
1	Jukurit	3
2	KooKoo	0
Third place
4	Sport	0
6	KalPa	1

== Qualification ==
Rank	Team	GP	W	T	L	GF	GA	Diff	Pts
1.	UJK	6	3	1	2	25	18	+7	10
2.	Hokki	6	3	1	2	21	23	−2	10
3.	Diskos	6	3	0	3	19	21	−2	9
4.	Kiekko-Oulu	6	2	0	4	18	21	−3	6

Diskos got relegated to Suomi-sarja.
