= 2002–03 Mestis season =

2002–03 Mestis
- League: Mestis
- Sport: Ice hockey
- Duration: September 2002 – April 2003
- Number of teams: 12

Regular season
- Best record: Jukurit
- Runners-up: KooKoo
- Relegated to Suomi-sarja: UJK

Playoffs
- Finals champions: Jukurit
- Runners-up: Kiekko-Vantaa

Mestis seasons
- ← 2001–02 2003–04 →

The 2002–03 Mestis season was the third season of the Mestis, the second level of ice hockey in Finland. 12 teams participated in the league, and Jukurit won the championship.

== Standings ==
Rank	Team	GP	W	OTW	T	OTL	L	GF	GA	Diff	Pts
1.	Jukurit	44	31	2	2	2	7	166	86	+80	70
2.	KooKoo	44	25	3	6	1	9	168	111	+57	63
3.	Kiekko-Vantaa	44	22	5	4	2	11	175	131	+44	60
4.	KalPa	44	23	2	4	2	13	156	128	+28	60
5.	Sport	44	18	3	3	3	17	150	129	+21	48
6.	Hokki Kajaani	44	20	2	3	1	18	151	135	+16	48
7.	Ahmat	44	19	2	2	2	19	153	152	+1	46
8.	Hermes	44	15	2	6	3	18	131	121	+10	43
9.	TuTo	44	18	0	4	1	21	158	160	−2	41
10.	FPS	44	13	2	4	3	22	143	174	−31	37
11.	Haukat	44	11	2	5	3	23	123	147	−24	34
12.	UJK	44	2	0	1	2	39	87	287	−200	7

== Playoffs ==
Quarterfinals
1	Jukurit	3
8	Hermes	0
2	KooKoo	3
7	Ahmat	1
3	Kiekko-Vantaa	3
6	Hokki	0
4	KalPa	1
5	Sport	3

Semifinals
1	Jukurit	3
5	Sport	1
2	KooKoo	1
3	Kiekko-Vantaa	3

Finals
1	Jukurit	3
3	Kiekko-Vantaa	2
Third place
2	KooKoo	1
5	Sport	0

== Qualification ==
Rank	Team	GP	W	OTW	T	OTL	L	GF	GA	Diff	Pts
1.	Haukat	10	6	1	2	0	1	41	22	+19	16
2.	Salamat	10	7	0	1	0	2	36	22	+14	15
3.	UJK	10	5	0	1	1	3	31	24	+7	12
4.	SaPKo	10	4	0	0	2	4	28	32	−4	10
5.	Jokipojat	10	0	2	1	1	6	24	40	−16	6
6.	Diskos	10	0	2	1	1	6	18	38	−20	6

UJK was relegated to Suomi-sarja.
