= 2000–01 Mestis season =

2000–01 Mestis
- League: Mestis
- Sport: Ice hockey
- Duration: September 2000 – April 2001
- Teams: 12

Regular season
- Best record: TUTO Hockey
- Runners-up: Jukurit

Playoffs
- Finals champions: Jukurit
- Runners-up: TUTO Hockey

Mestis seasons
- 2001–02 →

The 2000–01 Mestis season was the first season of the Mestis, the second level of ice hockey in Finland. 12 teams participated in the league, and Jukurit won the championship.

== Standings ==
Rank	Team	GP	W	T	L	GF	GA	Diff	Pts
1.	TUTO Hockey	44	27	8	9	201	126	+75	62
2.	Jukurit	44	30	1	13	183	100	+83	61
3.	Hermes	44	25	7	12	153	122	+31	57
4.	Kiekko-Vantaa	44	22	5	17	160	143	+17	49
5.	Sport	44	21	5	18	153	129	+24	47
6.	Haukat	44	19	9	16	155	135	+20	47
7.	Diskos	44	20	3	21	157	146	+11	43
8.	Ahmat	44	16	4	24	134	170	−36	36
9.	FPS	44	15	4	25	130	179	−49	34
10.	Jokipojat	44	13	7	24	110	161	−51	33
11.	KooKoo	44	13	5	26	100	147	−47	31
12.	UJK	44	12	4	28	106	184	−78	28

== Playoffs ==
Quarterfinals
1	TUTO Hockey	3
8	Ahmat	0
2	Jukurit	3
7	Diskos	0
3	Hermes	3
6	Haukat	0
4	Sport	3
5	Kiekko-Vantaa	0

Semifinals
1	TUTO Hockey	3
4	Sport	0
2	Jukurit	3
3	Hermes	1

Finals
1	TUTO Hockey	2
2	Jukurit	3
Third place
3	Hermes	1
4	Sport	0

== Qualification ==
Rank	Team	GP	W	T	L	GF	GA	Diff	Pts
1.	KalPa	6	2	4	0	23	17	+6	8
2.	UJK	6	3	1	2	16	17	−1	7
3.	EPS	6	2	1	3	14	19	−5	5
4.	KooKoo	6	1	2	3	15	15	0	4
