= Vaasan Sport =

Finnish ice hockey team

- City: Vaasa
- League: Liiga
- Founded: 1939; 1962 (Ice Hockey Team)
- Home arena: Vaasa Arena (capacity: 5,200)
- Colors: Red, black, white
- Owner: HT Vaasan Sport Oy
- General manager: Ari-Pekka Pajuluoma
- Head coach: Doug Shedden
- Captain: Sebastian Stålberg
- Website: vaasansport.fi
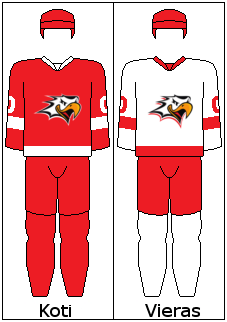

Sport, known by its full name as Hockey Team Vaasan Sport Oy or simply Vaasan Sport, is a Finnish ice hockey team playing in Liiga, and is based at the 5,200-capacity Vaasa Arena in Vaasa. The team was established in 1939 as IF Sport (Idrottsföreningen Sport).

== History ==
Vaasan Sport was founded in 1939 as IF Sport. The team was involved in the founding of the Finnish top division Liiga, formerly known as SM-Liiga, in 1975, but was relegated only one year later after the 1975–1976 season.

After the relegation, Sport played in the Finnish First Division (since then renamed to Mestis), until they were relegated in 1991–1992 to the Finnish Second Division. Climbing back up to the First division proved to be a tough task and wasn't accomplished until spring 1997, with the game-winning goal of the deciding game against Kiekko-67 being scored by Kari Teräväinen in overtime.

The 2008–09 season was a success as Sport won the Mestis championship. However, in the league qualification series the team lost the last game to Ässät in a best-of-7 format, thus remaining in Mestis. The overall qualification series were close as Sport at one point was a single goal away from beating Ässät in overtime and being promoted to Liiga, but was unable to score.

Sport struggled with bad economy during the 2000s, which almost led the club to bankruptcy. The club board made improvements to secure the future of the club, cutting down on the budget for the whole new season, as well as installing new head coach and former world ice hockey champion Antti Törmänen, who started to build a new young team from scratch. Eventually, the club surfaced from its financial struggles and went ahead to consistently fight for the championship victory again.

In 2014, during the 2013–2014 Mestis season, it was confirmed that Sport would be promoted to Liiga for the 2014–2015 season, regardless of the outcome of the ongoing championship. This was due to former Liiga team Jokerit transferring to KHL, leaving an open slot in the Finnish top division.

== Supporters ==
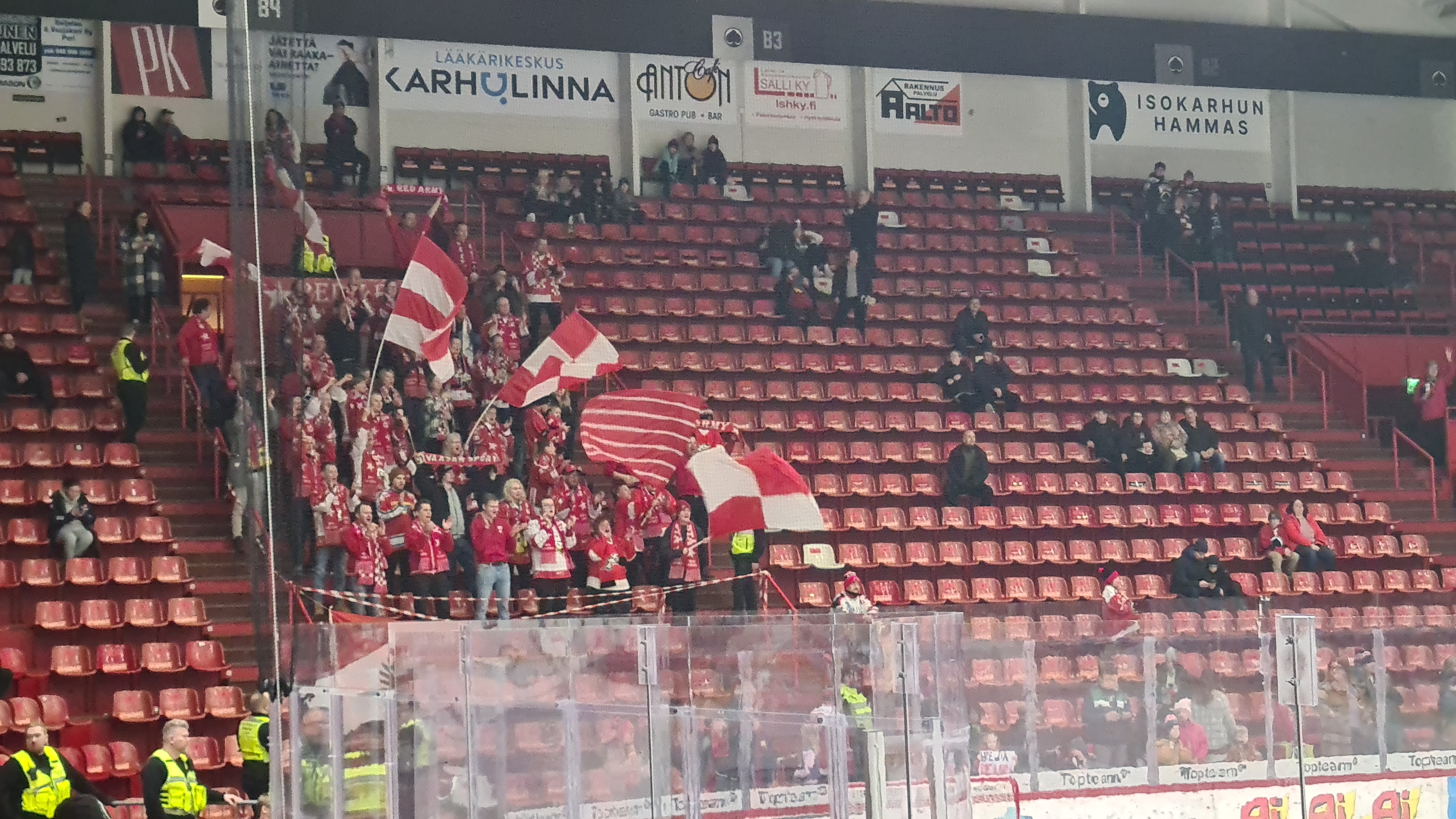
Vaasan Sport fans in an away game against Porin Ässät in 2023

The official fan club is called Red Army. The fan club Ultras 06 function as non-official supporters.

== Players ==
=== Current roster ===
Updated 30 December 2023.

No.	Nat	Player	Pos	S/G	Age	Acquired	Birthplace
60	(Finland)	Rasmus Reijola	G	L	33	2020	Vantaa, Finland
95	(Czech Republic)	Miroslav Svoboda	G	L	30	2023	Vsetín, Czech Republic
53	(Finland)	Aatu Aarnio	D/F	L	25	2022	Naantali, Finland
65	(Canada)	Zack Hayes	D	L	26	2023	Calgary, Alberta, Canada
52	(Finland)	Valtteri Hietanen (A)	D	L	33	2022	Virrat, Finland
16	(Sweden)	Theodor Johnsson	D	R	23	2023	Helsingborg, Sweden
37	(Finland)	Atro Leppänen	D	L	27	2023	Mänttä, Finland
96	(Slovenia)	Bine Masic	D	L	23	2021	Kranj, Slovenia
24	(Canada)	Reece Scarlett	D	R	32	2023	Edmonton, Canada
4	(Finland)	Teemu Suhonen	D	L	37	2023	Kuopio, Finland
36	(Finland)	Juho Tommila	D	R	33	2018	Lapland, Finland
63	(Finland)	Lari Heikkinen	LW	L	25	2019	Oulu, Finland
11	(Sweden)	Simon Hjalmarsson (A)	LW	L	37	2022	Värnamo, Sweden
25	(Sweden)	Axel Holmström	C	L	29	2021	Arvidsjaur, Sweden
55	(Finland)	Oskari Hult	LW	L	22	2023	Vantaa, Finland
10	(Sweden)	Jens Lööke	RW	R	28	2022	Gävle, Sweden
40	(Sweden)	Carl Mattson	C/LW	L	26	2023	Gammelstad, Sverige
80	(Sweden)	Kalle Miketinac	C	L	26	2023	Kallinge, Sweden
21	(Finland)	Miro Nalli	LW	L	27	2023	Sahalahti, Finland
71	(Finland)	Viljami Nieminen	LW	L	24	2022	Denver, United States
86	(Finland)	Jesse Rantanen	C	L	23	2023	Lappi, Finland
13	(Finland)	Erik Riska (A)	C/LW	L	36	2008	Pietarsaari, Finland
12	(Finland)	Anton Stråka	C	L	27	2023	Uusikaarlepyy, Finland
17	(Sweden)	Sebastian Stålberg (C)	RW	R	35	2020	Lerum, Sweden
28	(Sweden)	Johan Sundström	C	R	33	2023	Gothenburg, Sweden
91	(Sweden)	Sebastian Wännström	RW	R	34	2023	Gävle, Sweden

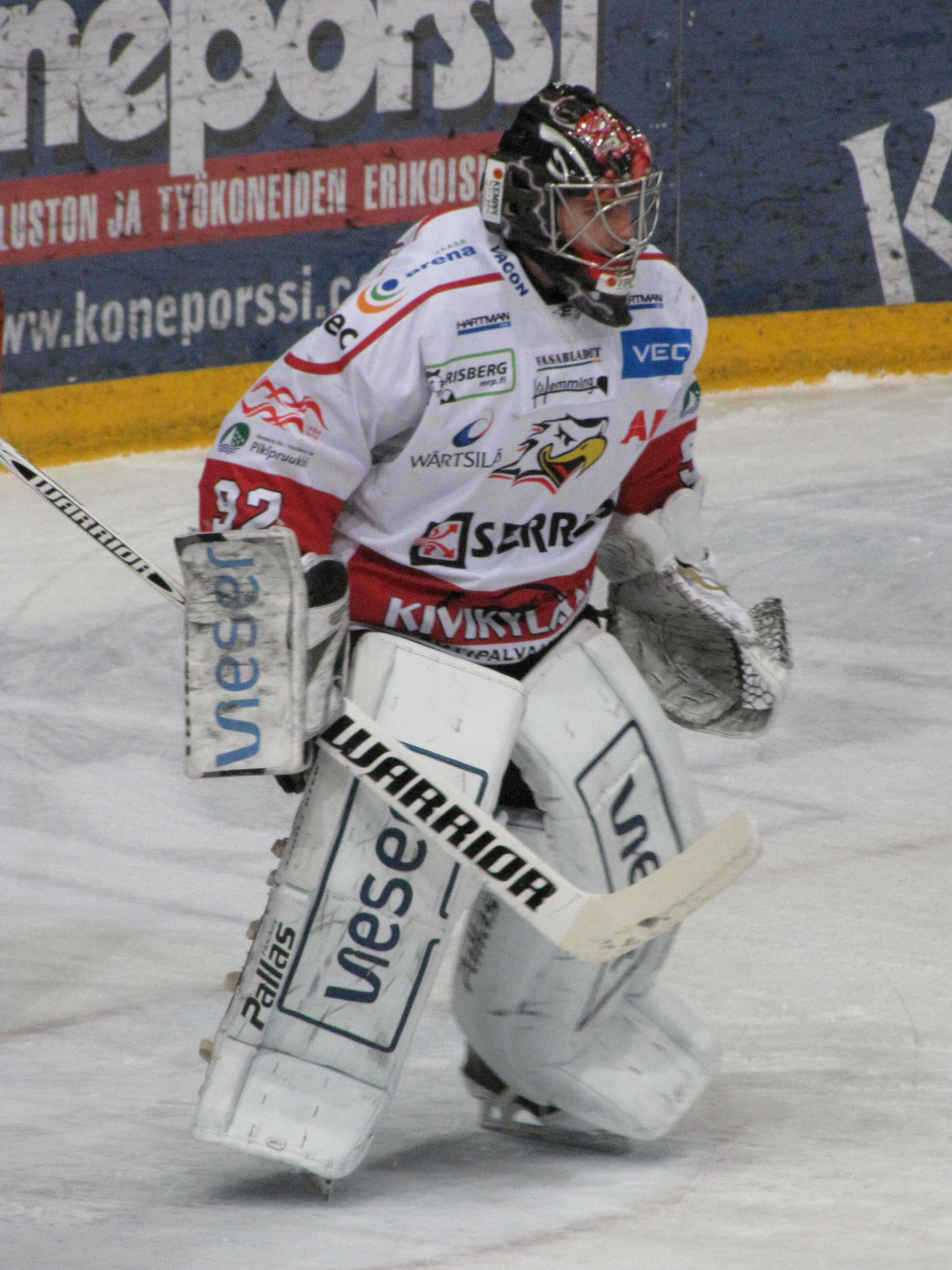
Jarno Laitinen representing Sport in 2012

=== Retired numbers ===
- # 29 Håkan Hjerpe
- # 27 Tomi Väkelä
- # 14 Sami Laaksoharju (not officially retired, but number has been off rotation after the death of Laaksoharju)

=== Notable alumni ===
- (Canada) Chris Allen
- (Canada) Matthieu Descoteaux
- (United States) Dale Dunbar
- (Canada) Glen Gulutzan
- (Finland) Tero Leinonen
- (Canada) Ian MacNeil
- (Finland) Oskar Osala
- (Canada) David Saunders
- (Latvia) Janis Sprukts
- (Finland) Juho-Tuomas Appel
- (Latvia) Vjačeslavs Fanduļs
- (Latvia) Oļegs Sorokins
- (Finland) Toni Sihvonen

=== Notable coaches ===
- (Finland) Juhani Tamminen
- (Finland) Jukka Jalonen
- (Finland) Kari Heikkilä
- (Finland) Risto Dufva
- (Canada) Doug Shedden
