= Mikkelin Jukurit =

- City: Mikkeli
- League: Liiga
- Founded: 1970
- Home arena: Let's Go Areena
- Colours: Blue, yellow, red, white
- Owner: Jukurit HC Oy
- Head coach: Jonne Virtanen
- Captain: Connor Ford
- Affiliates: SaPKo (Suomi-sarja)
- Farm club: Jukurit U20
- Website: jukurit.fi
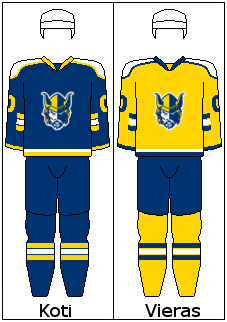

Mikkelin Jukurit is a professional ice hockey team in Liiga, the top tier Finnish ice hockey league. They play in Mikkeli, Finland, at the Kalevankankaan jäähalli (also known as Let's Go Areena for sponsorship reasons). The team has won seven Mestis (second highest level) championships (2001, 2002, 2003, 2006, 2013, 2015, and 2016).

== History ==
Mikkelin Jukurit was founded in 1970. During the 1970s Jukurit played in the second highest level but the 1980s and 1990s were spent in lower levels. The 1998–99 season was a turning point for the team, when Matti Turunen became the executive director and Risto Dufva from Jyväskylä became head coach. In the 1999–2000 season they won their first championship in the newly established Suomi-sarja league, and returned to the Mestis after a 20-year break. Jukurit won the Mestis championship in their first three seasons and made the semifinals consecutively on their first eight seasons. After Jukurit won a fourth championship in early 2006, Risto Dufva left the team. He was replaced by Finnish hockey legend Reijo Ruotsalainen as head coach but Ruotsalainen's tenure was short-lived and was replaced mid-season by a long-time assistant coach Pekka Lipiäinen. 2008–09 was the only Mestis season Jukurit did not make the playoffs. In 2009 an incorporation Jukurit HC Oy was founded. Until this the team had operated as an association.

After hiring Jarno Pikkarainen as head coach for the 2010–11 season, Jukurit returned to the finals but lost to Sport. Under Pikkarainen, Jukurit won another championship in 2012–13 and two more in 2015 and 2016 with Antti Pennanen as head coach. After the team's seventh Mestis championship, Jukurit was granted a permission to purchase a license to Liiga, the top league in Finnish ice hockey. During the team's 16 seasons in Mestis, they achieved seven gold medals, four silver medals, and one bronze medal.

Since the season 2016–17 Jukurit has played in Liiga. During the first four seasons, the team did not make the playoffs, finishing 11th, 13th, 14th, and 13th in the regular season. Coached by former NHL player Olli Jokinen, Jukurit finished second in the regular season of 2021–22, earning their first ever playoff spot.

== Personnel ==
=== Current roster ===
Updated 15 September 2024

No.	Nat	Player	Pos	S/G	Age	Acquired	Birthplace
98	(Canada)	Peter Abbandonato	C	L	28	2024	Laval, Quebec, Canada
35	(Finland)	Eetu Anttila	G	L	27	2024	Naantali, Finland
3	(Finland)	Juuso Arola	D	L	27	2024	Lahti, Finland
27	(United States)	Alex Berardinelli	C	L	31	2024	Greensburg, Pennsylvania, United States
67	(Finland)	Aleks Haatanen	LW	R	25	2024	Vantaa, Finland
9	(Finland)	Aaron Hakala	RW	R	22	2024	Kempele, Finland
52	(Finland)	Topias Hynninen	C	L	20	2022	Vihti, Finland
76	(Finland)	Sakke Hämäläinen (A)	F	L	27	2024	Heinola, Finland
34	(Finland)	Severi Immonen	F	L	26	2024	Tuusniemi, Finland
58	(Sweden)	Kim Johansson	D	L	28	2024	Luleå, Sweden
23	(United States)	Isaac Johnson	RW	R	27	2024	Andover, Minnesota, United States
33	(Finland)	Santeri Koskela	C	L	23	2024	Jyväskylä, Finland
4	(Finland)	Valtteri Koskela	D	L	23	2024	Jyväskylä, Finland
60	(Sweden)	Niclas Lundgren (A)	D	L	36	2021	Västerås, Sweden
10	(Norway)	Thomas Olsen	RW	R	31	2024	Oslo, Norway
28	(Finland)	Niklas Peltomäki (A)	D	L	28	2022	Espoo, Finland
85	(Sweden)	Ludwig Persson	C	L	22	2024	Gothenburg, Sweden
54	(Finland)	Jesper Piitulainen (C)	RW	R	35	2016	Savonlinna, Finland
–	(Finland)	Niilo Romppanen	D	L	24	2022	Joensuu, Finland
36	(Finland)	Markus Ruusu	G	L	29	2022	Jyväskylä, Finland
18	(Finland)	Viljam Sandvik	C	R	23	2022	Loviisa, Finland
8	(Finland)	Kasper Soini	D	L	23	2023	Helsinki, Finland

=== Team officials ===
Updated 8 January 2022

Title	Staff Member
Team Manager	Mikko Hakkarainen
Head Coach	Olli Jokinen
Coach	Sergei Krivokrasov
Coach	Vesa Surenkin
Goaltending Coach	Mika Tarvainen
Video Coach	Jussi Hyvärinen
Equipment Manager	Jose Rämö
Trainer	Jukka Kääriäinen
Trainer	Niko Randelin
Physician	Jouni Huttunen
Physician	Roni Saren
Masseuse	Jari Veteläinen

=== Retired numbers ===
- # 12 Antti Laakso
- # 22 Martti Salminen
- # 24 Lasse Kanerva
- # 31 Petri Lehtonen

Number 21 is not in circulation, it belonged to Sami Lehmusmetsä who died in a traffic accident.

=== Captains ===
Name	Seasons
Lasse Kanerva	2000–02, 2005–07
Mikko Hakkarainen	2002–05
Timo Kuuluvainen	2007–08
Ilkka Kallioinen	2008–12
Pasi Järvinen	2012–14
Juuso Akkanen	2014–15
Marko Kauppinen	2015–17
Miika Roine	2017–20
Jesper Piitulainen	2020–21
Petrus Palmu	2021–present

=== Head coaches ===
Head coach	Seasons	
Jorma Paju	1970–1972	
Teuvo Myyryläinen	1972–1973	
Martti Helle	1973–1974	
Jukka Mattila	1974–1975	
Eero Välivuori	1975–1976	
Jukka Mattila	1976–1980	
Kari Kivilompolo	1980–1981	
Markku Mikkonen	1981–1983	
Ole Renlund	1983–1984	
Matti Ruohonen	1984–1986	Replaced mid-season 1985–86 by Hannu Riipinen
Hannu Muhonen	1986–1988	
Markku Mustonen	1988–1989	Replaced mid-season by Martti Salminen
Martti Salminen	1989–1991	
Pekka Kähönen	1991–1992	
Miroslav Paulus	1992–1993	
Jukka Penttinen	1992–1995	
Pertti Pöyry	1995–1998	
Risto Dufva	1998–2006	
Reijo Ruotsalainen	2006–2007	Replaced 26 January by Pekka Lipiäinen
Kari Makkonen	2007–2008	Replaced 13 October by Pekka Lipiäinen
Pekka Lipiäinen	2008–2009	
Jarno Pikkarainen	2010–2014	Replaced 4 December by Timo Turunen, 16 December by Antti Pennanen
Antti Pennanen	2014–2016	
Risto Dufva	2016–2018	
Pekka Kangasalusta	2018–2020	Replaced 6 January by Marko Kauppinen
Marko Kauppinen	2020–2021	
Olli Jokinen	2021–present	

=== Notable players ===
- G Tero Leinonen
- G Mikko Strömberg
- D Kalle Kaijomaa
- D Marko Kauppinen
- D Tommi Kovanen
- D Jukka-Pekka Laamanen
- D Mikko Mäenpää
- D Simo Mälkiä
- D Joni Tuominen
- D Ilkka Vaarasuo
- F Mikko Hakkarainen
- F Iivo Hokkanen
- F Juha-Pekka Hytönen
- F Petri Koskinen
- F Niko Laakkonen
- F Pentti Nöyränen
- F Olli Sipiläinen
- F Erkka Westerlund
- F, C Pentti Matikainen
- C Sergei Krivokrasov
- D Alberts Šmits, 5th overall in the 2026 NHL entry draft; highest-drafted Latvian draft pick in NHL history
- HC Risto Dufva
- HC Olli Jokinen
- HC Reijo Ruotsalainen

Notes: G = Goaltender, D = Defenceman, F = Forward, HC = Head coach, C = Coach
