= 2005–06 SM-liiga season =

- SM-liiga introduced a new logo before the start of the season
- TV partner(s): Canal+, Nelonen
- Finals champions: HPK Hämeenlinna
- Runners-up: Porin Ässät

SM-liiga seasons
- ← 2004–05 2006–07 →

The 2005–06 SM-liiga season was the 31st season of the SM-liiga, the top level of ice hockey in Finland. 14 teams participated in the league, and HPK Hämeenlinna won the championship.

== Regular season ==
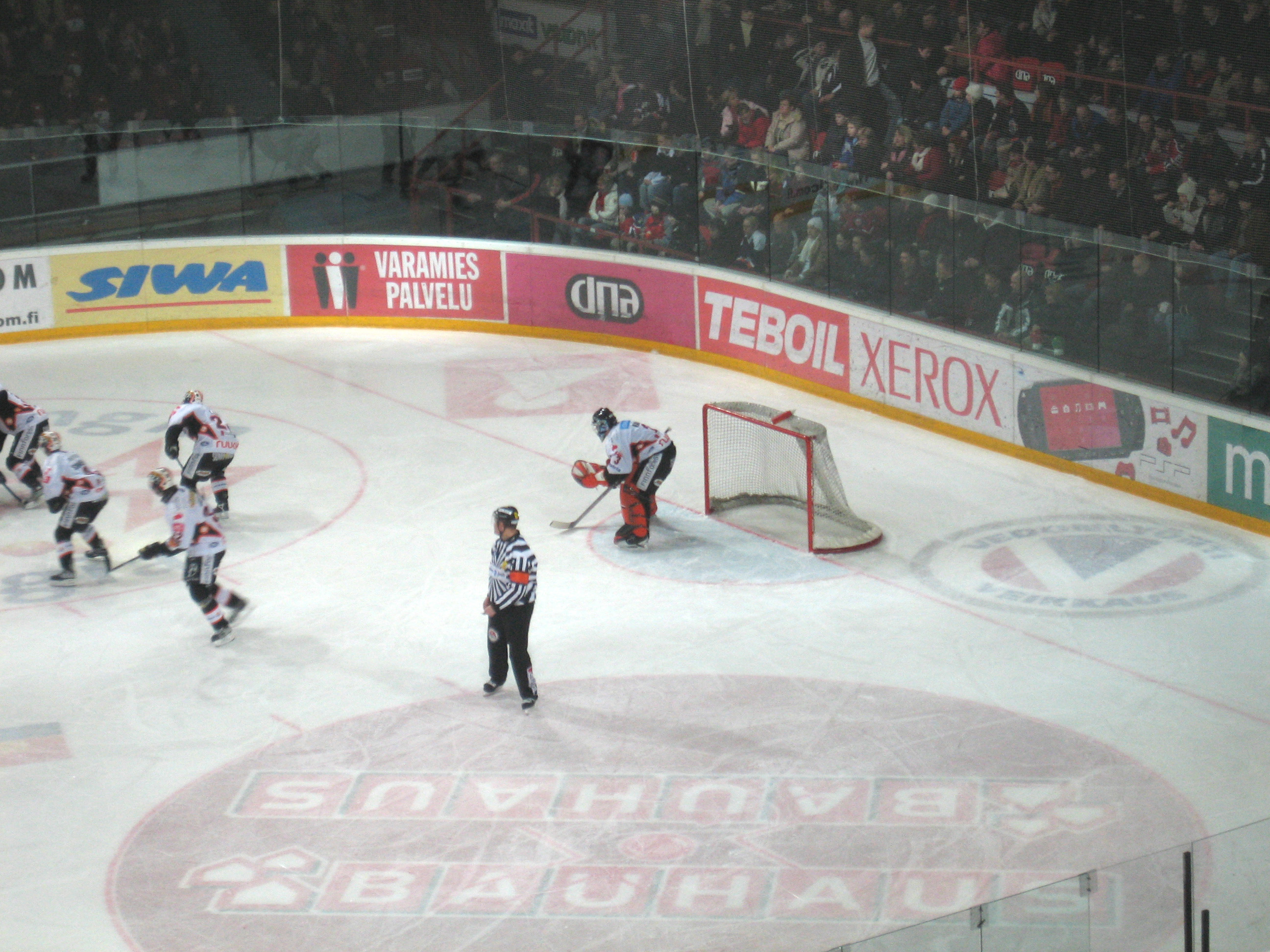
HPK against HIFK in January 2006.

	Club	GP	W	OTW	OTL	L	GF	GA	Diff	Pts
1	Kärpät	56	36	4	6	10	180	105	+75	122
2	HIFK	56	28	10	4	14	180	136	+44	108
3	HPK	56	28	4	10	14	174	136	+38	102
4	Tappara	56	28	5	8	15	157	129	+28	102
5	Ässät	56	27	6	4	19	145	123	+22	97
6	Ilves	56	23	9	5	19	144	139	+5	92
7	SaiPa	56	23	6	6	21	149	130	+19	87
8	Blues	56	23	4	7	22	152	135	+17	84
9	JYP	56	20	8	7	21	134	125	+9	83
10	TPS	56	14	11	8	23	119	135	-16	72
11	Jokerit	56	19	4	4	29	149	190	-41	69
12	Pelicans	56	18	4	5	29	125	171	-46	67
13	Lukko	56	16	3	5	32	121	150	-29	59
14	KalPa	56	6	5	4	41	112	237	-125	32

== Playoffs ==
=== Preliminary round ===
- SaiPa - TPS 2:0 (3:2, 3:2 P)
- Blues - JYP 2:1 (3:4, 2:1, 3:2 P)

=== Quarterfinals ===
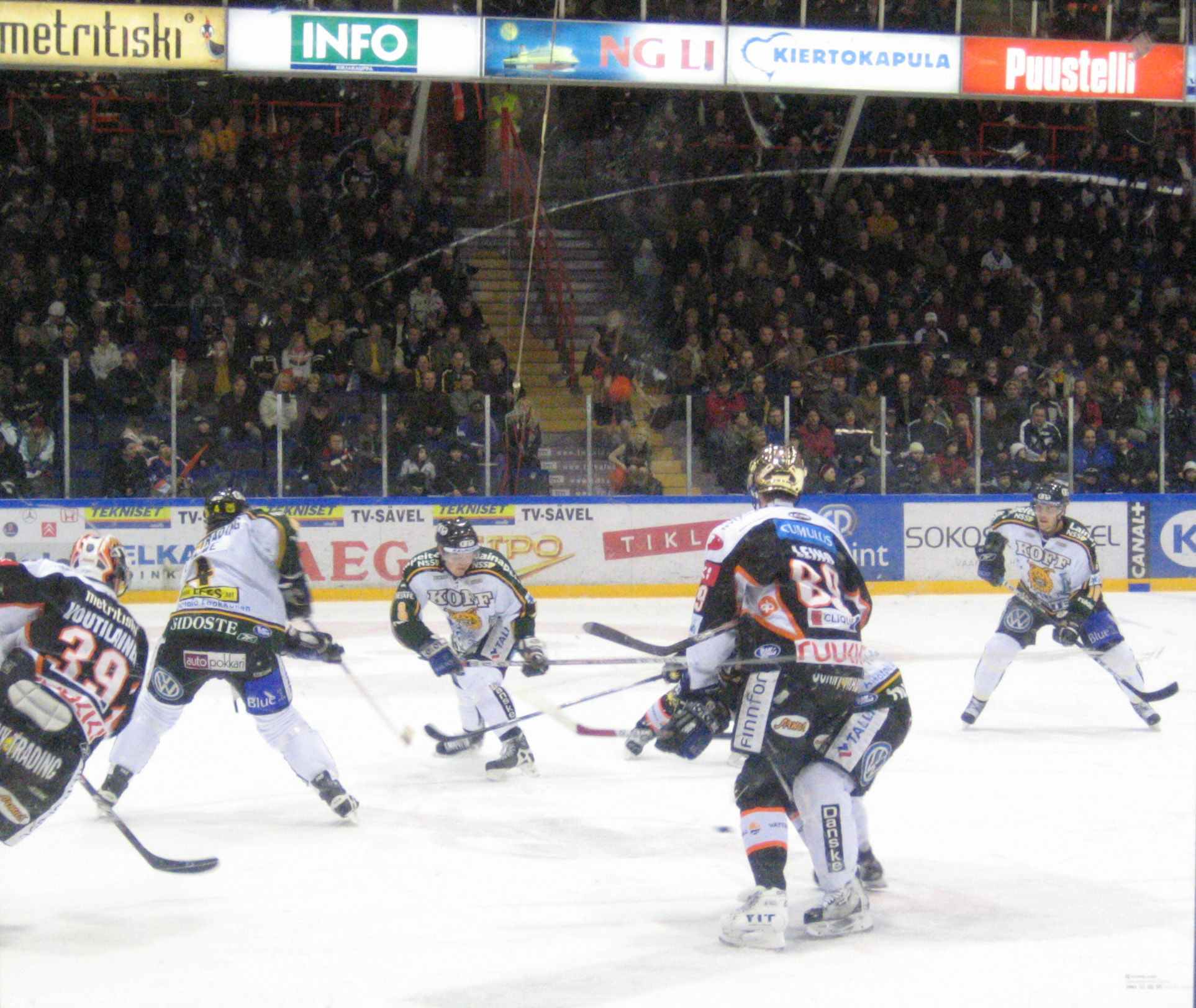
HPK and Ilves from the third game of the series

- Kärpät - Blues 4:2 (2:1 P, 4:1, 2:3, 2:1, 2:3 P, 5:2)
- HIFK - SaiPa 4:2 (4:3 P, 2:1, 4:3, 2:3, 2:5, 3:2 P)
- HPK - Ilves 4:0 (4:2, 2:1 P, 4:2, 1:0)
- Tappara - Ässät 2:4 (3:2, 1:3, 5:2, 2:5, 2:3 P, 2:3)

=== Semifinals ===
- Kärpät - Ässät 1:3 (1:3, 1:3, 6:3, 3:4)
- HIFK - HPK 2:3 (5:2, 1:2 P, 5:4 P, 0:4, 0:1)

=== 3rd place ===
- Kärpät - HIFK 6:2

=== Final ===
- HPK - Ässät 3:1 (1:0, 4:5 P, 5:3, 4:1)
