= 2006–07 SM-liiga season =

- TV partner(s): Canal+, Nelonen
- Finals champions: Oulun Kärpät
- Runners-up: Jokerit

SM-liiga seasons
- ← 2005–06 2007–08 →

The 2006–07 SM-liiga season was the 32nd season of the SM-liiga, the top level of ice hockey in Finland. 14 teams participated in the league, and Karpat Oulu won the championship.

== Regular season ==
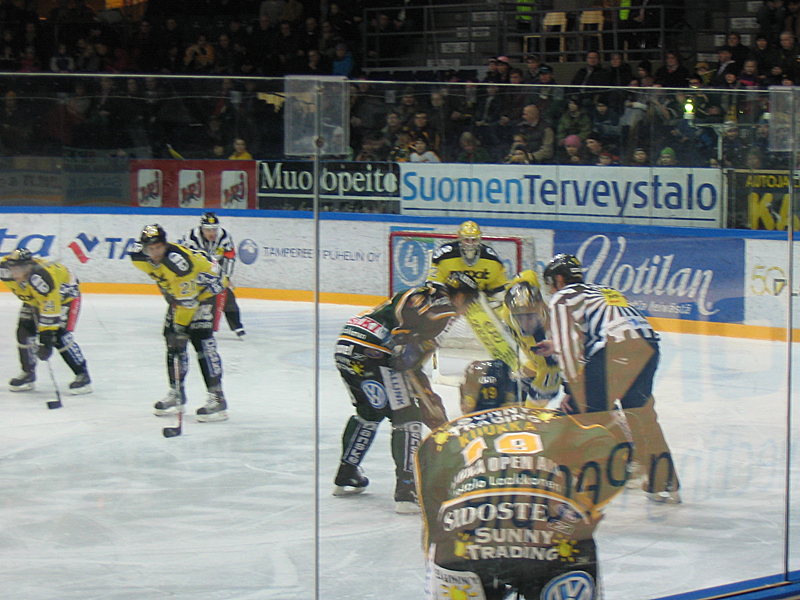
Ilves and SaiPa face each other in Tampere in February 2007

	Club	GP	W	OTW	OTL	L	GF	GA	Diff	Pts
1	Kärpät	56	33	6	4	13	197	125	+72	121
2	Jokerit	56	32	6	3	15	194	144	+50	111
3	HPK	56	25	11	5	15	192	160	+32	102
4	Tappara	56	28	3	8	17	159	130	+29	98
5	Blues	56	24	5	10	17	156	135	+21	92
6	HIFK	56	25	5	5	21	165	159	+6	90
7	TPS	56	23	6	5	22	167	155	+12	86
8	Lukko	56	21	5	8	22	183	191	-8	81
9	Ilves	56	21	6	5	24	139	147	-8	80
10	Pelicans	56	19	7	6	24	147	151	-4	77
11	SaiPa	56	20	4	4	28	150	181	-31	72
12	JYP	56	15	7	8	26	138	165	-27	67
13	Ässät	56	15	3	3	35	133	199	-66	54
14	KalPa	56	12	5	5	34	130	208	-78	51

== Playoffs ==
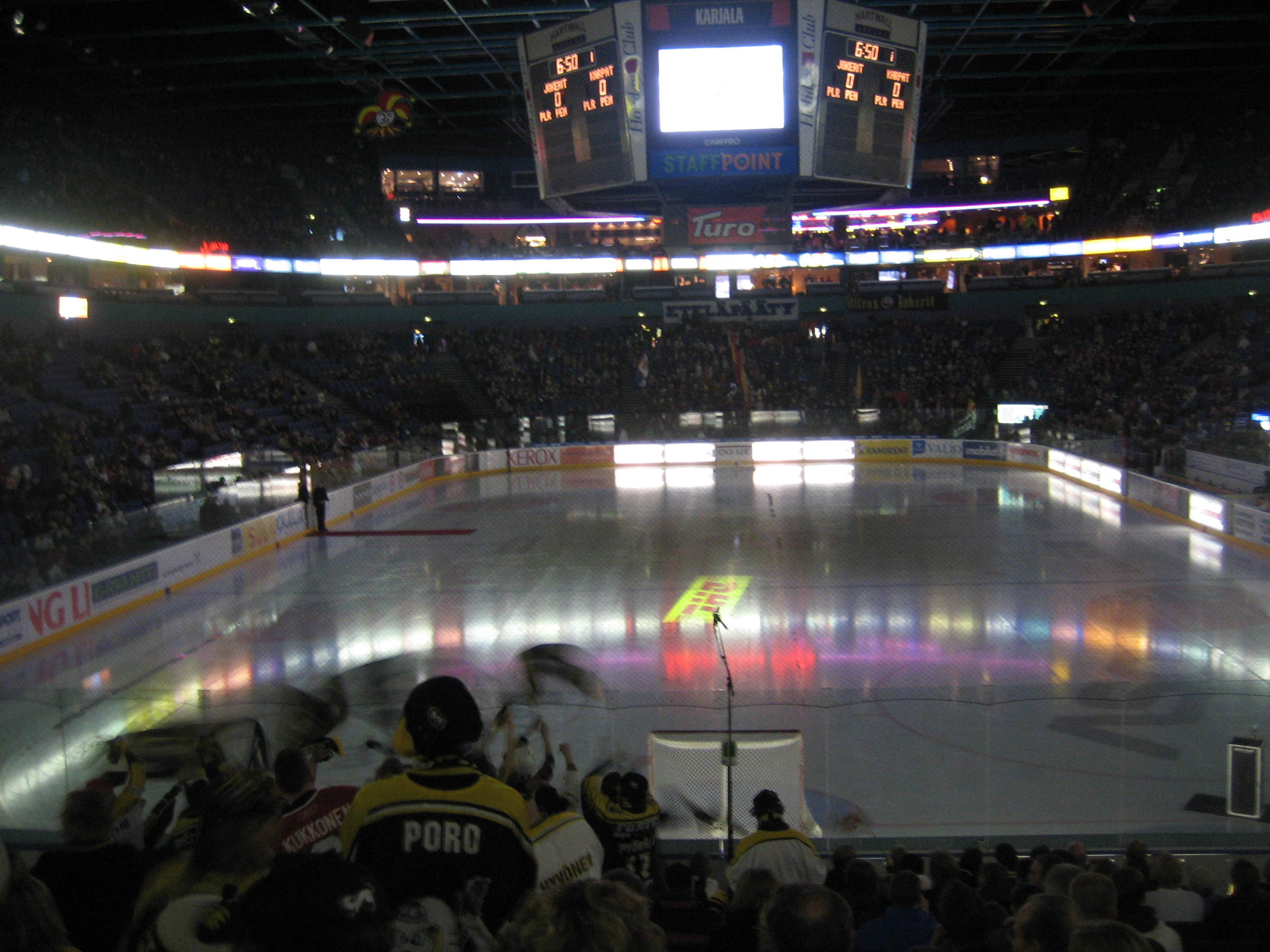
Hartwall Areena before the start of the second final

=== Preliminary round ===
- TPS - Pelicans 0:2 (0:2, 1:3)
- Lukko - Ilves 1:2 (3:2, 1:2, 2:5)

=== Quarterfinals ===
- Kärpät - Pelicans 4:0 (3:0, 2:0, 3:2 P, 1:0)
- Jokerit - Ilves 4:0 (2:1, 4:1, 6:1, 4:2)
- HPK - HIFK 4:1 (4:1, 1:2, 5:0, 4:2, 2:1 P)
- Tappara - Blues 1:4 (3:2 P, 2:3 P, 1:7, 0:2, 1:2 P)

=== Semifinal ===
- Kärpät - Blues 3:0 (4:1, 3:2, 3:2 P)
- Jokerit - HPK 3:0 (2:1 P, 2:1 P, 4:0)

=== 3rd place ===
- HPK - Blues 7:2

=== Final ===
- Kärpät - Jokerit 3:0 (3:2, 4:2, 5:2)
