= 2007–08 SM-liiga season =

- TV partner(s): Canal+, Nelonen
- Finals champions: Oulun Kärpät
- Runners-up: Espoo Blues

SM-liiga seasons
- ← 2006–07 2008–09 →

The 2007–08 SM-liiga season was the 33rd season of the SM-liiga, the top level of ice hockey in Finland. 14 teams participated in the league, and Karpat Oulu won the championship.

== Regular season ==
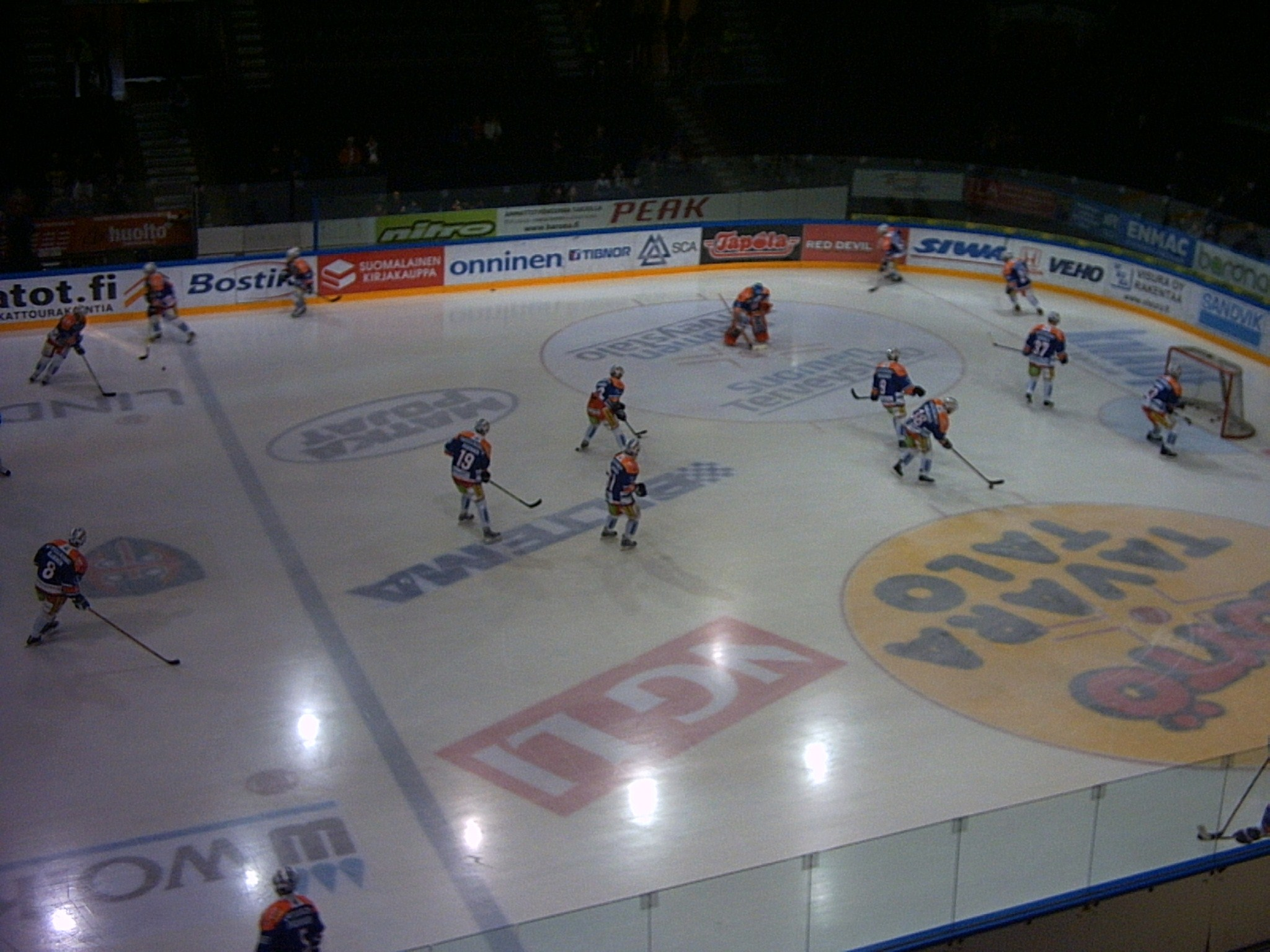
Tappara warms up before the HIFK match in February 2008

	Club	GP	W	OTW	OTL	L	GF	GA	Diff	Pts
1	Kärpät	56	32	10	5	9	205	129	+76	121
2	Blues	56	33	5	6	12	165	114	+51	115
3	Jokerit	56	29	5	8	14	179	152	+27	105
4	Tappara	56	28	8	4	16	185	136	+49	104
5	JYP	56	27	7	6	16	174	129	+45	101
6	Pelicans	56	28	5	4	19	176	142	+34	98
7	HIFK	56	23	11	6	16	167	145	+22	97
8	Ilves	56	24	8	2	22	161	164	-3	90
9	Lukko	56	18	4	6	28	137	156	-19	68
10	TPS	56	18	2	9	27	130	164	-34	67
11	SaiPa	56	15	5	7	29	115	155	-40	62
12	HPK	56	16	1	6	33	123	183	-60	56
13	KalPa	56	13	5	3	35	128	179	-51	52
14	Ässät	56	10	2	6	38	111	208	-97	40

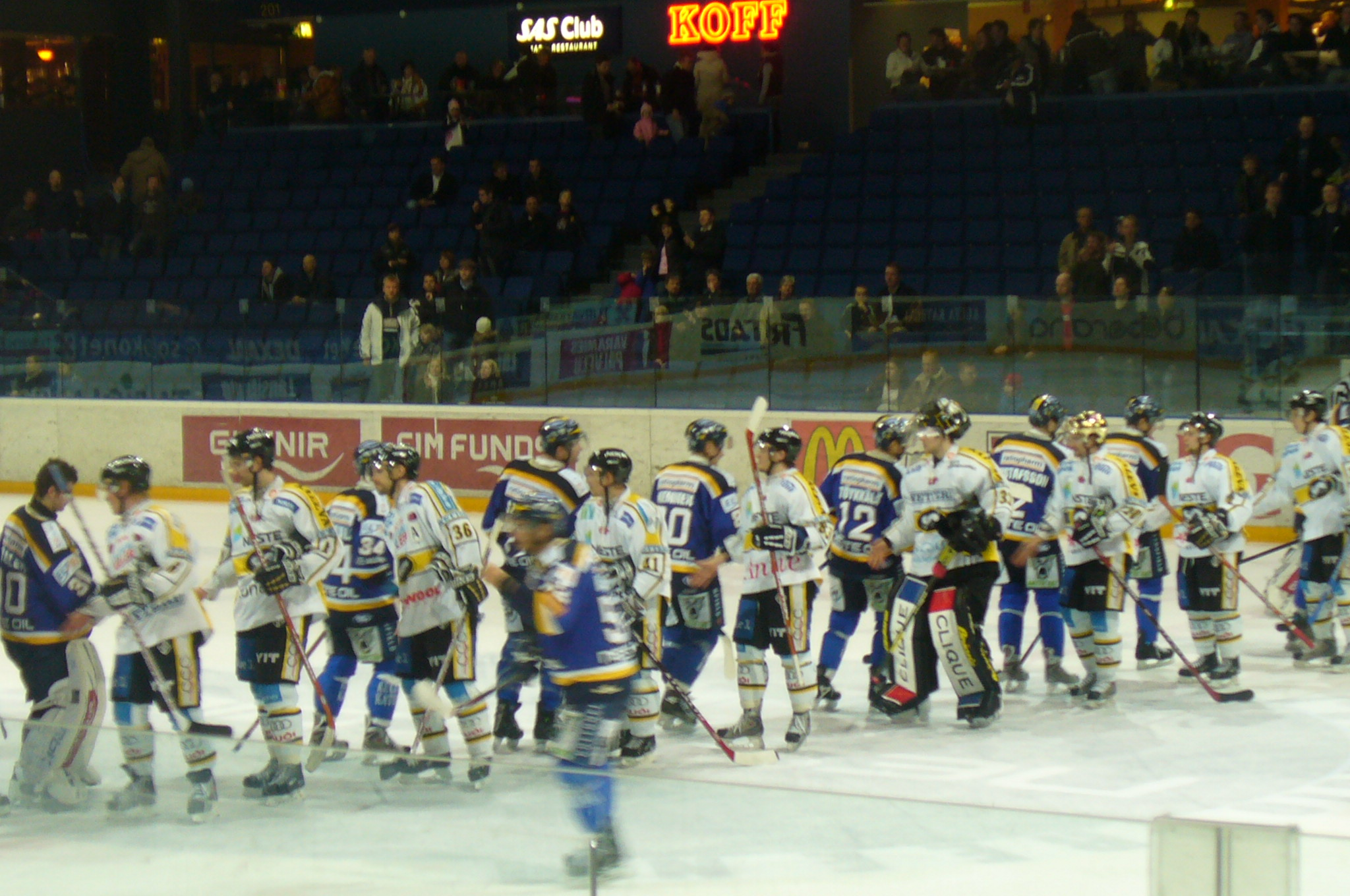
Blues and Kärpat in February 2008

== Playoffs ==
=== Preliminary round ===
- HIFK - TPS 2:0 (5:4 P, 1:0)
- Ilves - Lukko 2:1 (4:2, 3:4 P, 1:0)

=== Quarterfinal ===
- Kärpät - Ilves 4:2 (7:1, 2:3, 7:5, 0:3, 6:3, 2:1 P)
- Blues - HIFK 4:1 (1:2, 6:3, 6:1, 3:0, 4:1)
- Jokerit - Pelicans 4:2 (8:4, 1:3, 3:2 P, 5:4, 4:5 P, 5:4 P)
- Tappara - JYP 4:2 (2:1, 4:5 P, 4:2, 0:3, 4:1, 6:2)

=== Semifinal ===
- Kärpät - Tappara 4:0 (4:3, 4:2, 3:2, 7:3)
- Blues - Jokerit 4:3 (2:3 P, 4:3 P, 2:3 P, 0:4, 5:1, 2:1 P, 5:3)

=== 3rd place ===
- Jokerit - Tappara 3:4

=== Final ===
- Kärpät - Espoo Blues 4:1 (3:1, 2:1 P, 2:3 P, 4:0, 5:1)
