= Liiga =

Ice hockey league in Finland

- Current season, competition or edition: 2026–27 Liiga season
- Formerly: SM-sarja (1933–1975); SM-liiga (1975–2013)
- Sport: Ice hockey
- Founded: 1975; 51 years ago
- First season: 1975–76
- CEO: Mikko Pulkkinen
- Motto: Se on totta (It's for real)
- No. of teams: 16
- Country: Finland
- Most recent champion: Tappara (14th title) (2025–26)
- Most titles: Tappara (14 titles)
- Broadcasters: Telia Company, TV5
- Level on pyramid: Level 1
- Relegation to: Mestis
- International cup: Champions Hockey League
- Related competitions: Auroraliiga
- Website: Liiga.fi

The Liiga, colloquially called the Finnish Elite League in English, and officially known as SM-liiga in Finnish and FM-ligan in Swedish, is the top professional ice hockey league in Finland. The league comprises 16 teams from all around Finland with relegation and promotion between the Mestis. The winner of the Liiga playoffs is awarded the Kanada-malja ("Canada Bowl") at the end of each season.

Teams from the Liiga participate in the IIHF's annual Champions Hockey League (CHL), competing for the European Trophy. Participation is based on the strength of the various leagues in Europe (excluding the Eurasian Kontinental Hockey League).

The Liiga was established in 1975 to replace the former SM-sarja, which was fundamentally an amateur competition. The Liiga is not directly overseen by the Finnish Ice Hockey Association, but the league and association have an agreement of cooperation. SM is a common abbreviation for Suomen mestaruus, "Finnish Championship".

== History ==
The SM-liiga was established in 1975 to replace the amateur competition SM-sarja. Kalervo Kummola was elected to become the first chief executive officer of the SM-liiga, who served until 1987. The SM-liiga wasn't established under the Finnish ice Hockey Association that oversees all the other leagues and cups in the country. The playoffs were introduced in Finnish ice hockey for the first time during the inaugural SM-liiga season.

At first there were 10 clubs in the SM-liiga. The league expanded to 12 teams in the 1988–89 season. In 2000, the SM-liiga was expanded by one team, after which the league was closed so that teams could not drop out of the league or move up from a lower league. For the 2005–2006 season, the Mestis winner KalPa was promoted to the series, which met the criteria required for a place in the league. The league qualifiers were brought back for the 2008–09 season. However, as a condition for promotion, the Mestis team that cleared the qualifiers should have bought the shares of the losing Liiga team at the price determined by the league. Otherwise, the losing Liiga team would have continued playing in the league. Starting from the 2013–2014 season, the Liiga qualifiers were replaced by a license system where the winner of Mestis can apply for a Liiga license. If granted, the club will be promoted to the league after a transition period of one season.

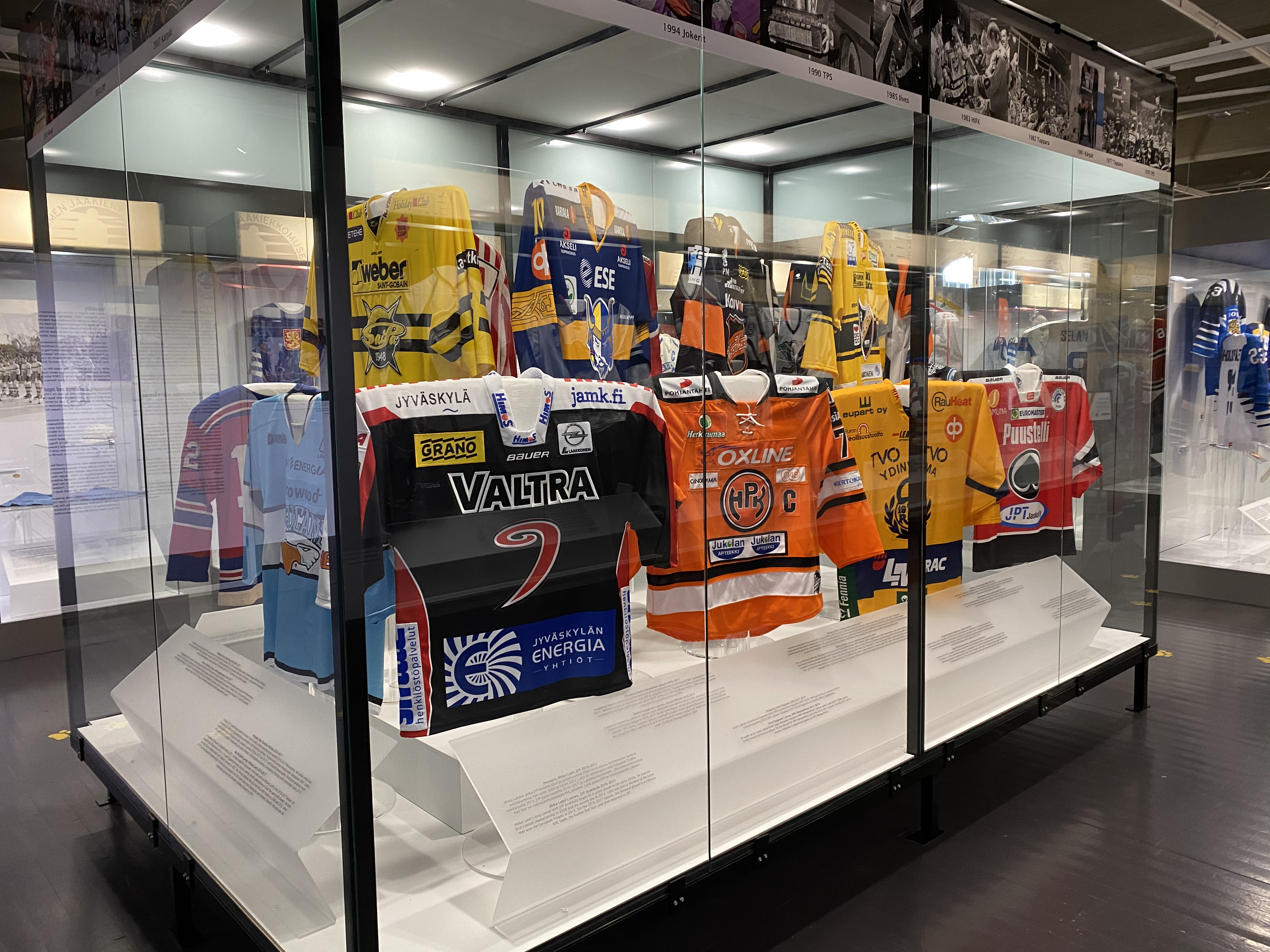
SM-liiga clubs' former jerseys

The league changed its marketing name to just Liiga for the 2013–14 season, and introduced a new logo to match. The 2019–20 Liiga season was terminated on March 13, 2020 due to the COVID-19 pandemic. Due to the decision, the final round of the regular season and the playoffs were not played, and the 2020 Finnish hockey championship was not awarded.

For the 2024–25 season, Kiekko-Espoo were promoted to the Liiga as the league expanded to 16 teams. The league was opened for relegation and promotion between the Mestis for the first time since 2013.

According to a 2023 article by The Hockey Writers, the SM-liiga is considered one of the best leagues in Europe and the world along with the Swedish Hockey League and behind the Kontinental Hockey League. Going into the 2024–25 CHL season, the Liiga was ranked the No. 3 league in Europe, allowing them to send their top four teams to compete in the CHL.

== Clubs ==
=== List of clubs ===
The team names are usually the traditional name of the club. All clubs are commonly known by the name of their team. Oy and Ab are the abbreviations for limited company in Finnish and Swedish respectively.

Location of teams in 2026–27 SM-liiga

Team name	Club's registered name	Location	Home venue	Capacity	2025–26 season standing (playoffs)	Titles SM-liiga	Titles overall
HIFK	Oy HIFK Hockey Ab	Helsinki	Helsinki Ice Hall	8,200	10th (12th)	4	7
HPK	HPK Liiga Oy	Hämeenlinna	Patria-areena	5,360	12th (8th)	2	2
Ilves	Ilves-Hockey Oy	Tampere	Nokia Arena	12,700	4th (4th)	1	16
Jukurit	Jukurit HC Oy	Mikkeli	Ikioma Areena	4,200	15th (did not qualify)	0	0
JYP	JYP Jyväskylä Oy	Jyväskylä	Synergia-areena	4,437	6th (10th)	2	2
KalPa	KalPa Hockey Oy	Kuopio	Olvi Arena	5,300	7th (5th)	1	1
Kiekko-Espoo	Kiekko-Espoo Oy	Espoo	Espoo Metro Areena	6,982	9th (11th)	0	0
KooKoo	KooKoo Hockey Oy	Kouvola	Lumon arena	5,950	2nd (2nd)	0	0
Kärpät	Oulun Kärpät Oy	Oulu	Oulun Energia Areena	6,300	14th (did not qualify)	8	8
Lukko	Rauman Lukko Oy	Rauma	Kivikylän Areena	4,500	5th (9th)	1	2
Pelicans	Lahden Pelicans Oy	Lahti	Isku Areena	4,403	11th (7th)	0	0
SaiPa	Liiga-SaiPa Oy	Lappeenranta	Kisapuisto	4,820	3rd (3rd)	0	0
Sport	Hockey-Team Vaasan Sport Oy	Vaasa	Vaasa Arena	5,185	16th (did not qualify)	0	0
Tappara	Tamhockey Oy	Tampere	Nokia Arena	12,700	1st (1st)	14	21
TPS	HC TPS Turku Oy	Turku	Gatorade Center	10,500	13th (did not qualify)	10	11
Ässät	HC Ässät Pori Oy	Pori	Isomäki Ice Hall	6,150	8th (6th)	2	3

=== SM-liiga timeline ===
1970					1980										1990										2000										2010										2020						
75; 76	76; 77	77; 78	78; 79	79; 80	80; 81	81; 82	82; 83	83; 84	84; 85	85; 86	86; 87	87; 88	88; 89	89; 90	90; 91	91; 92	92; 93	93; 94	94; 95	95; 96	96; 97	97; 98	98; 99	99; 00	00; 01	01; 02	02; 03	03; 04	04; 05	05; 06	06; 07	07; 08	08; 09	09; 10	10; 11	11; 12	12; 13	13; 14	14; 15	15; 16	16; 17	17; 18	18; 19	19; 20	20; 21	21; 22	22; 23	23; 24	24; 25	25; 26	26; 27
HIFK
Ilves
Tappara
TPS
Ässät																																																			
Jokerit																																																			
Lukko																																																			
KOOVEE																																																			
Sport																																																			
FoPS																																																			
	Kiekkoreipas														Hockey- Reipas	Reipas Lahti								Pelicans																											
		Kärpät																																																	
					SaiPa																																														
								HPK																																											
										JyP HT												JYP																													
											KalPa																																								
												KooKoo																																							
														JoKP																																					
																	Kiekko-Espoo						Blues																										Kiekko-Espoo		
																			TuTo																																
																																									Jukurit										

== Format ==
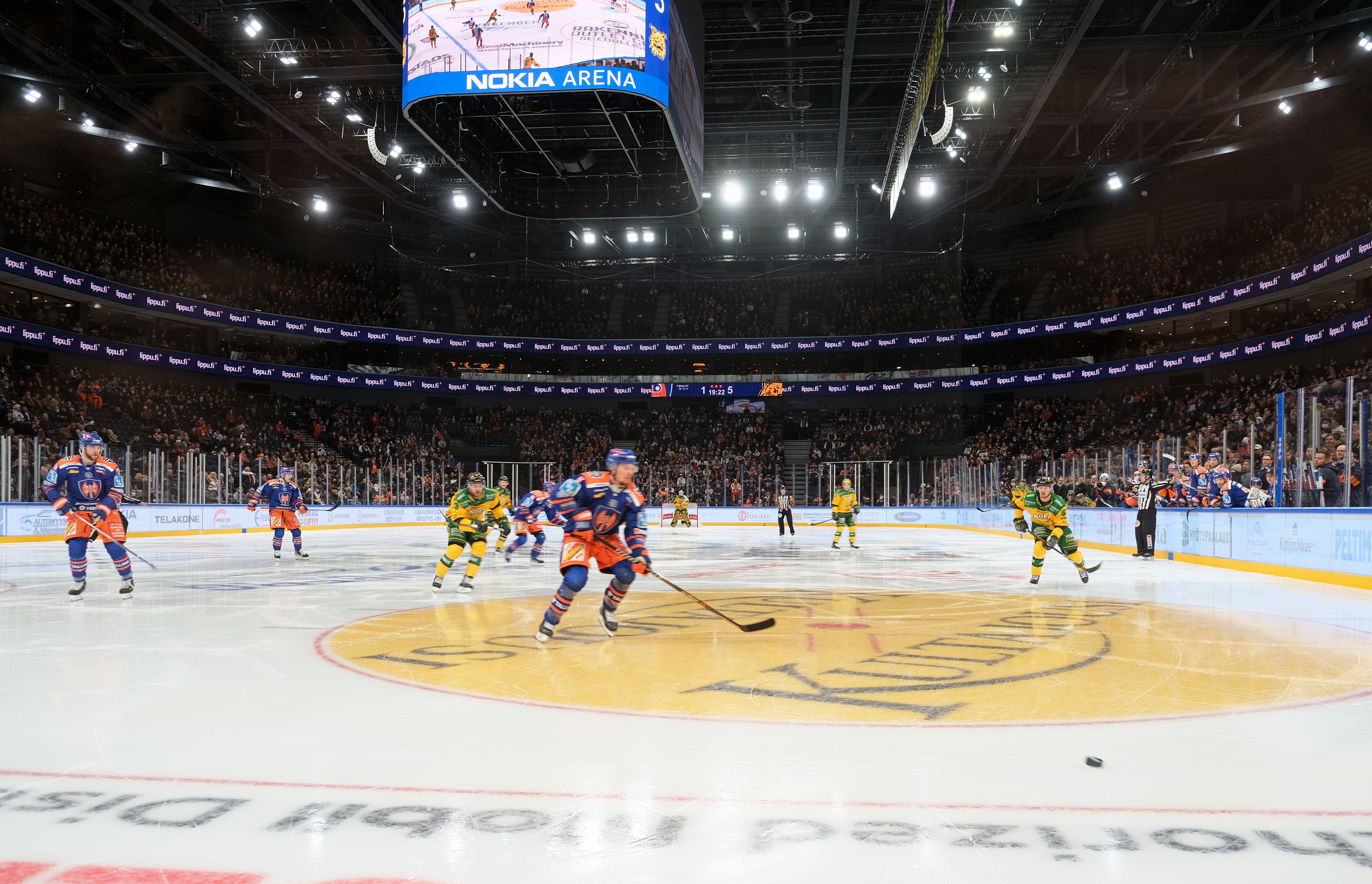
Opening match of Tampere Deck Arena: Tappara vs. Ilves in December 2021

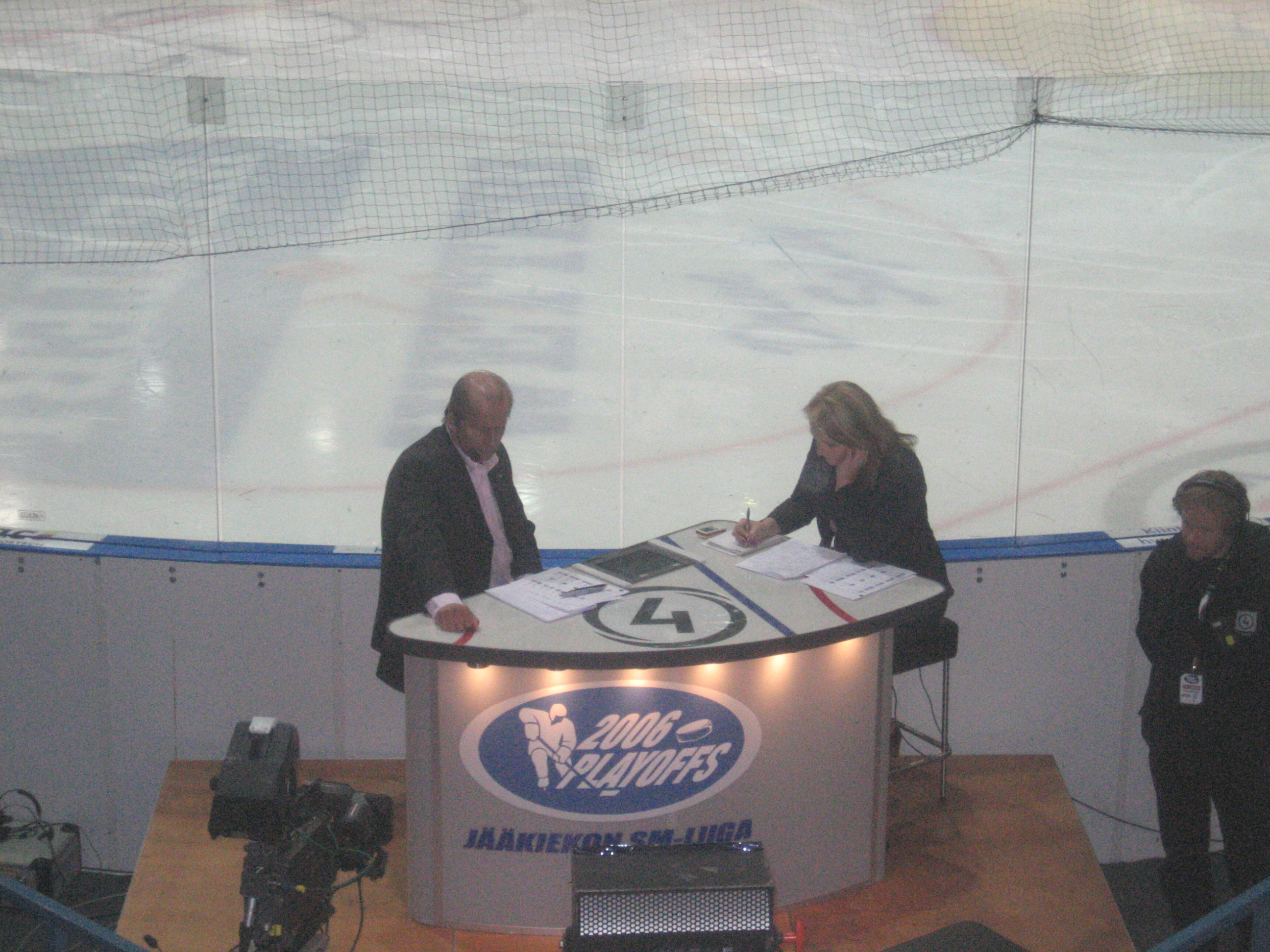
SM-liiga studio in the semifinals in 2006

Regular season: All teams play 60 matches. Each match consists of 60 minutes regulation time, and in the event of a tie, the winner is decided by a three-on-three sudden death, 5-minute overtime. Ties after overtime are decided by a shootout, where each team has three shooters in the beginning. If the game is tied after three shooters, the shootout will be decided by individual shooters against one another until one scores and the other does not.

Scoring: A win in regulation time is worth three points, a win by sudden death overtime two points, a loss by sudden death overtime one point and a loss in regulation time zero points. Teams will be ranked by points, and teams tied by points are ranked by the greater number of wins in regulation.

Playoffs: The four best teams at the conclusion of regular season proceed directly to quarter-finals. Teams placing between fifth and twelfth (inclusive) will play preliminary play-offs best-out-of-five – the four winners take the last four slots to quarter-finals. All series since then are best-of-seven. Losers of the semi-finals play a bronze medal match. Teams are paired up for each round according to regular season results so that the highest-ranking team will play against the lowest-ranking, second highest against the second lowest, and so on. Higher-ranking teams get home advantage. Each playoff match consists of a 60-minute regulation time which in the event of a tie is followed by extra 20-minute periods of 5-on-5 sudden death overtime, in which the first team to score wins.

Relegation: The 16th and 15th placed teams will play in the playout series to decide which team plays against the Mestis champion.

Scheduling: The regular season begins around mid-September. It takes a one-and-half-week break around the end of October to the beginning of November, when Team Finland competes in Karjala Tournament. There is a one-week Christmas break. During Winter Olympic years, a break is reserved for the Winter Olympic Games. The regular season is completed around mid-March and preliminary playoffs ensue almost immediately. The playoffs are completed by mid-April, so that all players are available for the World Championships.

== Winner ==
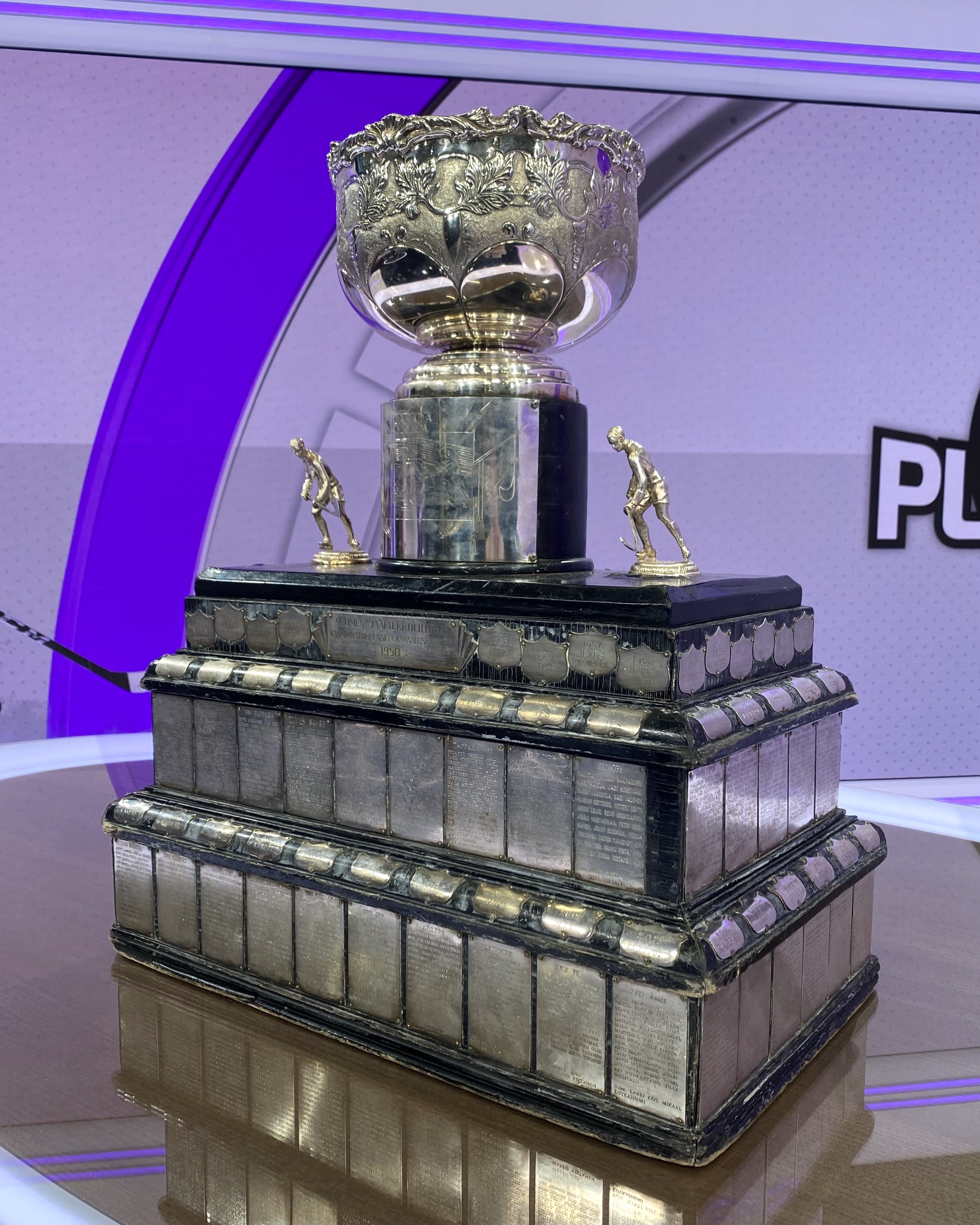
The Kanada-malja

The winners of the playoffs receive gold medals and the Kanada-malja, the championship trophy of the Liiga. The winners of the regular season receive a trophy (Harry Lindbladin muistopalkinto) as well, though it is considered less prestigious than the bronze medals of the playoffs.

=== Previous winners ===
- 1976 – TPS
- 1977 – Tappara
- 1978 – Ässät
- 1979 – Tappara
- 1980 – HIFK
- 1981 – Kärpät
- 1982 – Tappara
- 1983 – HIFK
- 1984 – Tappara
- 1985 – Ilves
- 1986 – Tappara
- 1987 – Tappara
- 1988 – Tappara
- 1989 – TPS
- 1990 – TPS
- 1991 – TPS
- 1992 – Jokerit
- 1993 – TPS
- 1994 – Jokerit
- 1995 – TPS
- 1996 – Jokerit
- 1997 – Jokerit
- 1998 – HIFK
- 1999 – TPS
- 2000 – TPS
- 2001 – TPS
- 2002 – Jokerit
- 2003 – Tappara
- 2004 – Kärpät
- 2005 – Kärpät
- 2006 – HPK
- 2007 – Kärpät
- 2008 – Kärpät
- 2009 – JYP
- 2010 – TPS
- 2011 – HIFK
- 2012 – JYP
- 2013 – Ässät
- 2014 – Kärpät
- 2015 – Kärpät
- 2016 – Tappara
- 2017 – Tappara
- 2018 – Kärpät
- 2019 – HPK
- 2020 – Cancelled because of the Coronavirus pandemic
- 2021 – Lukko
- 2022 – Tappara
- 2023 – Tappara
- 2024 – Tappara
- 2025 – KalPa
- 2026 – Tappara

== All time statistical leaders ==
=== Top 10 regular-season scoring leaders ===
These are the top-ten regular season point-scorers in SM-liiga history. Figures are updated after each completed SM-liiga regular season.

- * – current player

Note: Pos = Position; GP = Games Played; G = Goals; A = Assists; Pts = Points

Points
Player	Pos	GP	G	A	Pts
Janne Ojanen	C	876	283	516	799
Arto Javanainen	C	688	462	330	792
Ville Vahalahti	LW	977	260	427	687
Kristian Kuusela	LW	1107	280	458	738
Jari Lindroos	C	649	230	432	662
Esa Keskinen	C	478	215	443	658
Matti Hagman	C	432	217	432	649
Risto Jalo	C	594	275	409	646
Juha-Pekka Haataja	RW	881	256	326	582
Raimo Helminen	C	751	161	420	581

=== Top 10 regular-season scoring leaders (imports) ===
These are the top-ten regular season point-scorers for import players in SM-liiga history. Figures are updated after each completed SM-liiga regular season.

- * – current player

Note: Pos = Position; GP = Games Played; G = Goals; A = Assists; Pts = Points

Points
Player	Pos	GP	G	A	Pts
Éric Perrin	C	643	189	343	532
Otakar Janecký	C	450	133	346	479
Aleksandr Barkov	LW	518	135	281	416
Darren Boyko	C	476	171	236	407
Jan Čaloun	RW	298	145	230	375
Vjačeslavs Fanduļs	C	476	148	211	359
Tomáš Záborský	C	468	170	182	352
Allan Measures	D	619	100	238	338
Shayne Toporowski	RW	464	135	185	320
Stefan Öhman	C	419	104	160	264

=== Top 10 regular-season games played (goaltender) ===
These are the top-ten most regular season games played by a goaltender in SM-liiga history. Figures are updated after each completed SM-liiga regular season.

- * – current player

Leaderboard
Player	GP
Eero Kilpeläinen	518
Pasi Kuivalainen	517
Jukka Tammi	510
Sakari Lindfors	471
Jussi Markkanen	471
Hannu Kamppuri	460
Ari-Pekka Siekkinen	447
Mika Lehto	404
Petri Vehanen	399
Teemu Lassila	388

== Trophies ==
The Liiga's official logo

The following trophies are awarded by the SM-liiga:

- Harry Lindblad memorial trophy – SM-liiga Regular season winner
- Kultainen kypärä ("Golden helmet") – best player as voted by SM-liiga players
- Kalevi Numminen trophy – best coach
- Jarmo Wasama memorial trophy – rookie of the year
- Matti Keinonen trophy – most effective player
- Raimo Kilpiö trophy – most gentlemanly player
- Urpo Ylönen trophy – best goaltender
- Pekka Rautakallio trophy – best defenseman
- Aarne Honkavaara trophy – most goals scored in the regular season ("best goal scorer")
- Veli-Pekka Ketola trophy – most points scored during the regular season
- Lasse Oksanen trophy – best player during the regular season
- Jari Kurri trophy – best player during the playoffs
- Unto Wiitala trophy – best referee during the regular season
- Pentti Isotalo trophy – best linesman during the regular season
- Golden whistle trophy – best referee of the year, voted by players

In 1995, the trophies were named after Finnish hockey legends. Before that, trophies were named after sponsors.

== Video games ==
Teams from the league have appeared in EA Sports' NHL series, first in NHL 2001 and later on since NHL 2004.

== See also ==
- List of SM-liiga seasons
- List of Finnish ice hockey champions
- Mestis
- Naisten Liiga
- SM-sarja
- Ice hockey in Finland
- Leijonat
