= 2010 European Trophy =

- League: European Trophy
- Sport: Ice hockey
- Duration: 11 August – 5 September 2010
- Teams: 18
- Capital Division Winners: (Germany) Eisbären Berlin
- Central Division Winners: (Sweden) HV71 Jönköping
- Top scorer: (Czech Republic) Kamil Kreps (Kärpät)

Red Bull Salute
- Champions: (Germany) Eisbären Berlin
- Runners-up: (Sweden) HV71 Jönköping

European Trophy seasons seasons
- ← 2009 2011 →

The 2010 European Trophy was a European ice hockey tournament, played between 11 August and 5 September 2010. It was the first edition of the European Trophy. The final weekend was played in Salzburg and Zell am See, with the final held at the Eisarena Salzburg, which Eisbären Berlin won 5–3 over HV71 Jönköping.

== Participating clubs ==
The 2010 edition featured 18 participating clubs from seven countries around Europe. The clubs were divided into two divisions: the Capital Division and the Central Division. Each division consisted of nine teams in a regulation round, while the top four teams of each division qualified for the playoffs. However, the Red Bull Salzburg qualified as hosts and therefore took over the worst fourth ranked team out of both divisions, as they failed to end up in the top 4 spots in the Central Division.

2010 European Trophy teams (Central division,: Capital division)

Capital Division
Team	City	Team	City	Team	City
(Sweden) Djurgårdens IF	Stockholm	(Finland) HIFK	Helsinki	(Germany) Adler Mannheim	Mannheim
(Sweden) Färjestads BK	Karlstad	(Finland) Jokerit	Helsinki	(Germany) Eisbären Berlin	Berlin
(Sweden) Linköpings HC	Linköping	(Norway) Vålerenga IF	Oslo	(Czech Republic) Sparta Praha	Prague
Central Division
Team	City	Team	City	Team	City
(Sweden) Frölunda Indians	Gothenburg	(Finland) TPS	Turku	(Austria) EC Red Bull Salzburg	Salzburg
(Sweden) HV71	Jönköping	(Finland) Oulun Kärpät	Oulu	(Switzerland) SC Bern	Bern
(Sweden) Malmö Redhawks	Malmö	(Finland) Tappara	Tampere	(Switzerland) ZSC Lions	Zürich

== Regulation round ==
=== Capital Division ===
==== Standings ====
Pos	Team	Pld	W	OTW	OTL	L	GF	GA	GD	Pts	Qualification
1	(Germany) Eisbären Berlin	8	5	1	0	2	30	21	+9	17	Qualification for the playoffs
2	(Sweden) Färjestads BK	8	5	0	0	3	26	25	+1	15	Qualification for the playoffs
3	(Finland) Jokerit	8	4	1	0	3	20	15	+5	14	Qualification for the playoffs
4	(Czech Republic) Sparta Praha	8	4	0	1	3	22	16	+6	13	
5	(Sweden) Djurgårdens IF	8	3	1	1	3	23	18	+5	12	
6	(Finland) HIFK	8	4	0	0	4	27	24	+3	12	
7	(Germany) Adler Mannheim	8	3	0	2	3	20	24	−4	11	
8	(Sweden) Linköpings HC	8	2	1	1	4	19	26	−7	9	
9	(Norway) Vålerenga IF	8	1	1	0	6	20	38	−18	5	

Updated to match(es) played on unknown. Source:

==== Games ====
August 11

- HIFK – Eisbären Berlin 3 – 3 (0–1, 2–0, 1–1)
- Jokerit – Adler Mannheim 2 – 1 (0–0, 1–1, 1–0)
- Vålerenga IF – Sparta Praha 1 – 4 (1–2, 0–1, 0–1)
- Linköpings HC – Färjestads BK 1 – 2 (0–2, 0–0, 1–0)

August 13

- Jokerit – Eisbären Berlin 7 – 2 (1–0, 3–1, 3–1)
- HIFK – Sparta Praha 5 – 3 (4–1, 1–0, 0–2)
- Vålerenga IF – Adler Mannheim 3 – 2 GWS (1–2, 1–0, 0–0, 0–0, 1–0)
- Djurgårdens IF – Linköpings HC 5 – 0 (3–0, 1–0, 1–0)

August 14

- Vålerenga IF – Eisbären Berlin 1 – 5 (0–1, 1–3, 0–1)
- Färjestads BK – Djurgårdens IF 2 – 1 (2–0, 0–1, 0–0)
- HIFK – Adler Mannheim 1 – 2 (0–2, 1–0, 0–0)
- Jokerit – Sparta Praha 0 – 2 (0–1, 0–1, 0–0)

August 18

- Sparta Praha – Färjestads BK 5 – 1 (0–0, 2–0, 3–1)
- Jokerit – HIFK 3 – 1 (2–0, 0–0, 1–1)
- Adler Mannheim – Djurgårdens IF 3 – 0 (0–0, 2–0, 1–0)
- Eisbären Berlin – Linköpings HC 4 – 3 GWS (1–1, 2–2, 0–0, 0–0, 1–0)

August 20

- Sparta Praha – Djurgårdens IF 0 – 1 GWS (0–0, 0–0, 0–0, 0–0, 0–1)
- Jokerit – Vålerenga IF 2 – 1 (1–1, 0–0, 1–0)
- Eisbären Berlin – Färjestads BK 5 – 2 (1–0, 2–0, 2–2)
- Adler Mannheim – Linköpings HC 4 – 5 GWS (3–3, 1–0, 0–1, 0–0, 0–1)

August 21

- Eisbären Berlin – Djurgårdens IF 4 – 2 (1–1, 0–1, 3–0)
- Adler Mannheim – Färjestads BK 6 – 4 (2–0, 3–1, 1–1)
- HIFK – Vålerenga IF 7 – 3 (3–2, 2–0, 2–1)
- Sparta Praha – Linköpings HC 0 – 2 (0–0, 0–1, 0–1)

August 25

- Sparta Praha – Adler Mannheim 6 – 1 (3–0, 2–0, 1–1)
- Vålerenga IF – Färjestads BK 2 – 7 (0–2, 1–4, 1–1)
- Djurgårdens IF – HIFK 5 – 3 (1–0, 2–2, 2–1)
- Linköpings HC – Jokerit 3 – 1 (1–1, 1–0, 1–0)

August 27

- Linköpings HC – HIFK 0 – 3 (0–1, 0–2, 0–0)
- Djurgårdens IF – Vålerenga IF 6 – 2 (2–0, 2–2, 2–0)
- Färjestads BK – Jokerit 2 – 1 (1–0, 0–0, 0–1)
- Eisbären Berlin – Sparta Praha 5 – 2 (1–0, 3–1, 1–1)

August 28

- Vålerenga IF – Linköpings HC 7 – 5 (3–0, 2–2, 2–3)
- Djurgårdens IF – Jokerit 3 – 4 SD (1–1, 1–2, 1–0, 0–1)
- Adler Mannheim – Eisbären Berlin 1 – 3 (0–0, 1–1, 0–2)
- Färjestads BK – HIFK 6 – 4 (2–1, 3–2, 1–1)

=== Central Division ===
==== Standings ====
Pos	Team	Pld	W	OTW	OTL	L	GF	GA	GD	Pts	Qualification
1	(Sweden) HV71	8	6	1	0	1	39	15	+24	20	Qualification for the playoffs
2	(Switzerland) SC Bern	8	5	0	1	2	27	17	+10	16	Qualification for the playoffs
3	(Finland) Oulun Kärpät	8	5	0	1	2	25	25	0	16	Qualification for the playoffs
4	(Finland) TPS	8	4	1	1	2	25	25	0	15	Qualification for the playoffs
5	(Sweden) Frölunda Indians	8	3	2	1	2	31	31	0	14	
6	(Austria) EC Red Bull Salzburg	8	2	2	2	2	25	22	+3	12	Qualification for the playoffs (Note: EC Red Bull Salzburg qualified for the playoffs as the host team.)
7	(Switzerland) ZSC Lions	8	2	1	0	5	23	29	−6	8	
8	(Finland) Tappara	8	1	0	2	5	16	30	−14	5	
9	(Sweden) Malmö Redhawks	8	0	1	0	7	12	29	−17	2	

Updated to match(es) played on unknown. Source:

==== Games ====
August 11

- Oulun Kärpät – EC Red Bull Salzburg 3 – 2 (1–0, 2–1, 0–1)
- TPS – ZSC Lions 5 – 4 (2–1, 3–2, 0–1)
- Tappara – SC Bern 1 – 4 (0–1, 0–2, 1–1)
- Malmö Redhawks – Frölunda Indians 1 – 2 (0–0, 0–2, 1–0)

August 12

- Frölunda Indians – HV71 Jönköping 1 – 8 (0–5, 1–2, 0–1)

August 13

- TPS – SC Bern 4 – 3 (3–0, 0–0, 1–3)
- Oulun Kärpät – ZSC Lions 4 – 0 (2–0, 1–0, 1–0)
- Tappara – EC Red Bull Salzburg 3 – 4 SD (0–0, 3–1, 0–2, 0–1)
- HV71 Jönköping – Malmö Redhawks 5 – 2 (1–1, 3–1, 1–0)

August 14

- Oulun Kärpät – SC Bern 3 – 2 (1–1, 0–0, 2–1)
- Tappara – ZSC Lions 3 – 6 (0–2, 1–3, 2–1)
- TPS – EC Red Bull Salzburg 0 – 3 (0–1, 0–1, 0–1)

August 18

- TPS – Oulun Kärpät 4 – 3 SD (2–0, 0–1, 1–2, 1–0)
- EC Red Bull Salzburg – Frölunda Indians 4 – 5 SD (1–2, 1–2, 2–0, 0–1)
- ZSC Lions – HV71 Jönköping 1 – 6 (1–5, 0–1, 0–0)
- SC Bern – Malmö Redhawks 5 – 1 (1–1, 3–0, 1–0)

August 19

- SC Bern – HV71 Jönköping 5 – 1 (1–0, 2–0, 2–1)

August 20

- Oulun Kärpät – Tappara 3 – 2 (2–1, 0–1, 1–0)
- EC Red Bull Salzburg – Malmö Redhawks 2 – 3 SD (1–0, 1–1, 0–1, 0–1)
- ZSC Lions – Frölunda Indians 4 – 3 SD (0–0, 2–2, 1–1, 1–0)

August 21

- ZSC Lions – Malmö Redhawks 4 – 1 (1–0, 1–1, 2–0)
- Tappara – TPS 0 – 3 (0–2, 0–1, 0–0)
- EC Red Bull Salzburg – HV71 Jönköping 3 – 4 (1–1, 0–2, 2–1)
- SC Bern – Frölunda Indians 3 – 2 (1–1, 1–0, 1–1)

August 25

- HV71 Jönköping – Oulun Kärpät 6 – 0 (3–0, 3–0, 0–0)
- Frölunda Indians – Tappara 4 – 1 (1–0, 3–0, 1–1)
- Malmö Redhawks – TPS 0 – 3 (0–1, 0–1, 0–1)
- EC Red Bull Salzburg – ZSC Lions 4 – 2 (0–0, 2–1, 2–1)

August 27

- Malmö Redhawks – Oulun Kärpät 2 – 5 (1–2, 1–0, 0–3)
- HV71 Jönköping – Tappara 4 – 3 SD (2–2, 1–1, 0–0, 1–0)
- Frölunda Indians – TPS 7 – 6 SD (3–3, 2–2, 1–1, 1–0)
- ZSC Lions – SC Bern 2 – 3 (0–0, 2–0, 0–3)

August 28

- Frölunda Indians – Oulun Kärpät 7 – 4 (1–0, 2–2, 4–2)
- HV71 Jönköping – TPS 5 – 0 (1–0, 3–0, 1–0)
- Malmö Redhawks – Tappara 2 – 3 (0–0, 1–2, 1–1)
- SC Bern – EC Red Bull Salzburg 2 – 3 SD (1–0, 1–0, 0–2, 0–1)

=== Statistics ===
==== Scoring leaders ====
Player	Team	GP	G	A	PIM	Pts
(Czech Republic) Kamil Kreps	(Finland) Oulun Kärpät	8	5	6	2	11
(Canada) Mario Valery-Trabucco	(Finland) TPS	8	5	5	4	10
(Sweden) André Petersson	(Sweden) HV71 Jönköping	8	5	5	6	10
(Finland) Kristian Kuusela	(Finland) Oulun Kärpät	8	4	6	6	10
(Canada) Domenic Pittis	(Switzerland) ZSC Lions	8	4	6	8	10
(Finland) Teemu Ramstedt	(Finland) IFK Helsinki	7	3	7	14	10
(Germany) Florian Busch	(Germany) Eisbären Berlin	8	2	8	6	10
(Canada) Kris Beech	(Sweden) HV71 Jönköping	8	8	1	10	9
(Norway) Mattias Trygg	(Norway) Vålerenga IF	8	6	3	2	9
(Finland) Sami Venäläinen	(Finland) TPS	8	4	5	8	9

==== Leading goaltenders ====
Player	Team	GP	TOI	SOG	GA	GAA	SV%
(Finland) Tomi Karhunen	(Finland) Oulun Kärpät	2	120:00	62	2	1.00	96.77%
(Finland) Jan Lundell	(Finland) HIFK	2	120:00	79	3	1.50	96.20%
(Sweden) Cristopher Nihlstorp	(Sweden) Färjestads BK	4	200:00	78	3	0.90	96.15%
(Sweden) Daniel Larsson	(Sweden) HV71 Jönköping	4	240:00	127	5	1.25	96.06%
(Czech Republic) Filip Novotny	(Czech Republic) Sparta Praha	2	118:23	50	2	1.01	96.00%

== Playoffs ==
The top four teams of each division qualified for the playoffs, which took place in Salzburg and Zell am See between 3–5 September. However, EC Red Bull Salzburg qualified as hosts, as they failed to finish among the four best teams in their division, and therefore the best fourth ranked team out of both divisions qualified for the playoffs.

=== Bracket ===
Quarterfinals
2	(Sweden) Färjestads BK	4
3	(Finland) Oulun Kärpät	1
6	(Austria) EC Red Bull Salzburg	4
1	(Sweden) HV71 Jönköping	5
2	(Switzerland) SC Bern	2
3	(Finland) Jokerit	0
1	(Germany) Eisbären Berlin	4
4	(Finland) TPS	1

Semifinals
2	(Sweden) Färjestads BK	2
1	(Sweden) HV71 Jönköping	6
2	(Switzerland) SC Bern	1
1	(Germany) Eisbären Berlin	5

Finals
1	(Sweden) HV71 Jönköping	3
1	(Germany) Eisbären Berlin	5
Bronze medal game
2	(Sweden) Färjestads BK	1
2	(Switzerland) SC Bern	3

=== Matches ===
All times are local (UTC+2).

Quarter-finals

3 September; 17:30	(Sweden) Färjestads BK	4 – 1; 1–1, 2–0, 1–0	(Finland) Oulun Kärpät	Eisarena Salzburg, Salzburg

Game reference
Christian Berglund (Mikael Johansson, Pelle Prestberg) 08:15; Jonas Junland (Mikael Johansson, Pelle Prestberg) 27:02; Rickard Wallin (Mikael Johansson, Christian Berglund) 33:56; Anders Bastiansen (Emil Kåberg, Patrik Lundh) 56:49 / Goals / 03:39 Kristian Kuusela (Marko Luomala, Kamil Kreps)

3 September; 17:30	(Switzerland) SC Bern	2 – 0; 1–0, 0–0, 1–0	(Finland) Jokerit	Zeller Eishalle, Zell am See

Game reference
	Referees: Tschebull Zehetleitner; Kaspar Widmann
Andreas Hänni (Ivo Rüthemann) 11:41; Brett McLean (Andreas Hänni, Martin Plüss) 43:53 / Goals	Referees: Tschebull Zehetleitner; Kaspar Widmann

3 September; 20:45	(Austria) EC Red Bull Salzburg	4 – 5; 0–0, 2–1, 2–4	(Sweden) HV71 Jönköping	Eisarena Salzburg, Salzburg

Game reference
Manuel Latusa (Daniel Welser) 26:51; Manuel Latusa (Marco Pewal) 29:29; Thomas Koch (Mario Fischer) 43:48; Danny Bois (Nicolas Dumoulin) 55:03 / Goals / 38:34 Oscar Fantenberg (Martin Thörnberg); 41:10 Fredrik Bremberg (Kris Beech); 51:55 Adam Almqvist (Oscar Sundh); 53:27 Andreas Falk (Kamil Piros); 54:25 Oscar Sundh (André Petersson)

3 September; 20:45	(Germany) Eisbären Berlin	4 – 1; 1–0, 3–0, 0–1	(Finland) TPS	Zeller Eishalle, Zell am See

Game reference
	Referees: Mikael Noord; Robert Falkner; Gregor Kourosec; Florian Hofer
Jimmy Sharrow (Constantin Braun) 16:07; Stefan Ustorf (Alexander Weiß) 25:04; Jeff Friesen 29:01; Richie Regehr 29:58 / Goals / Miika Huczkowski (Antti Erkinjuntti) 54:53	Referees: Mikael Noord; Robert Falkner; Gregor Kourosec; Florian Hofer

5th place qualification games

4 September; 17:30	(Austria) EC Red Bull Salzburg	3 – 6; 2–1, 0–1, 1–4	(Finland) Oulun Kärpät	Eisarena Salzburg, Salzburg

Game reference
Ryan Duncan 15:05; Kevin Puschnik 18:29; Marco Brucker (Daniel Welser, Ramzi Abid) 44:37 / Goals / 00:23 Miko Lehtonen (Marko Luomala); 23:22 Juho Keränen (Tomi Stålhammar); 45:39 Kamil Kreps (Kristian Kuusela); 46:40 Kimmo Koskenkorva (Joonas Kemppainen); 49:05 Julius Junttila (Joonas Komulainen); 52:59 Vladimir Sicak (Atte Ohtamaa, Kimmo Koskenkorva)

4 September; 20:45	(Finland) TPS	3 – 8; 1–2, 1–1, 1–5	(Finland) Jokerit	Zeller Eishalle, Zell am See

Game reference
	Referees: Lesnjak Zehetleitner; Bedö Nemeth
Sami Venäläinen (Jens Skålberg, Janne Hauhtonen) 16:62; Sami Venäläinen (Mario Valery-Trabucco) 20:23; Mario Valery-Trabucco (J. Hauhtonen, S. Venäläinen) 43:08 / Goals / 06:12 Jukka Hentunen (Ben Eaves, Esa Pirnes); 08:14 Anti-Jussi Niemi (Teemu Pulkkinen, Janne Lahti); 33:27 Esa Pirnes (Jeremy Dehner, Jukka Hentunen); 40:25 Jere Ölander; 46:00 Antti Kerälä (Janne Lahti, Teemu Pulkkinen); 46:58 Jukka Hentunen (Marko Kauppinen); 49:23 Teemu Pulkkinen (Jeremy Dehner, Antti Kerälä); 57:25 Olavi Vauhkonen (Jani-Petteri Helenius)	Referees: Lesnjak Zehetleitner; Bedö Nemeth

Semi-finals

4 September; 17:30	(Germany) Eisbären Berlin	5 – 1; 0–0, 2–1, 3–0	(Switzerland) SC Bern	Zeller Eishalle, Zell am See

Game reference
	Referees: Berneker Persson; Newerka Hollenstein
Stefan Ustorf (Mads Christensen) 21:17; Richie Regehr (Derrick Walser) 28:07; André Rankel (Jeff Friesen, Derrick Walser) 46:18; André Rankel (Richie Regehr, Stefan Ustorf) 48:00; Stefan Ustorf 48:14 / Goals / 26:13 Brett McLean (Jean-Pierre Vigier)	Referees: Berneker Persson; Newerka Hollenstein

4 September; 20:45	(Sweden) HV71 Jönköping	6 – 2; 2–1, 2–0, 2–1	(Sweden) Färjestads BK	Eisarena Salzburg, Salzburg

Game reference
André Petersson (Oscar Sundh) 17:49; Kris Beech (Jukka Voutilainen, Juuso Hietanen) 19:41; Oscar Fantenberg (Juuso Hietanen, André Petersson) 30:28; André Petersson (Johan Lindström, Juuso Hietanen) 32:27; Martin Thörnberg (Jukka Voutilainen) 53:54; André Petersson 58:37 / Goals / 02:28 Christian Berglund (Rickard Wallin, Jonas Junland); 49:13 Marcus Paulsson (Rickard Wallin)

7th place game

5 September; 14:15	(Finland) TPS	9 – 5; 1–1, 4–1, 4–3	(Austria) EC Red Bull Salzburg	Zeller Eishalle, Zell am See

Game reference
	Referees: Schimm Persson; Korosec Lesniak
Sami Venäläinen (Ville Vahalahti, Janne Hauhtonen) 05:46; Ville Vahalahti (Markus Palmroth, Marko Kivenmäki) 24:11; Mario Valery-Trabucco (Antti Erkinjuntti, M. Kivenmäki) 25:42; Marko Virtala (Markus Palmroth) 26:51; Janne Hauhtonen (Marko Virtala, Markus Palmroth) 30:29; Sami Venäläinen (V. Vahalahti, M. Valery-Trabucco) 42:01; Robin Bergman 43:53; Sami Venäläinen (empty net) 58:50; Janne Hauhtonen (empty net) 59:56 / Goals / 00:30 Manuel Latusa (Thomas Koch, Daniel Welser); 33:22 Ryan Duncan (Thomas Koch, Nicolas Dumoulin); 48:25 Danny Bois (Ryan Duncan); 50:53 Danny Bois (Ramzi Abid); 56:01 Fabio Hofer (Dan Bertram, Nicolas Paul)	Referees: Schimm Persson; Korosec Lesniak

5th place game

5 September; 17:30	(Finland) Oulun Kärpät	2 – 4; 0–0, 2–0, 0–4	(Finland) Jokerit	Zeller Eishalle, Zell am See

Game reference
	Referees: Noord Falkner; Hribar Rakovic
Marko Luomala (Kamil Kreps) 27:11; Joonas Donskoi (Julius Junttila) 35:03 / Goals / 40:31 Marko Kauppinen (Ben Eaves, Ossi Väänänen); 41:41 Tomi Mäki (Tommi Kovanen); 46:30 Janne Lahti (Marko Kauppinen); 59:49 Janne Lahti	Referees: Noord Falkner; Hribar Rakovic

Bronze medal game

5 September; 17:30	(Switzerland) SC Bern	3 – 1; 0–1, 1–0, 2–0	(Sweden) Färjestads BK	Eisarena Salzburg, Salzburg; Attendance: 1,400

Game reference
	Referees: Tschebull Zehetleitner; Kaspar Widmann
Philipp Furrer (Justin Krueger, Brett McLean) 34:36; Philipp Furrer (Jean-Pierre Vigier, Brett McLean) 49:52; Brett McLean (David Jobin) 58:57 / Goals / 12:05 Anton Grundel (Mattias Sjögren)	Referees: Tschebull Zehetleitner; Kaspar Widmann

Final

5 September; 20:45	(Sweden) HV71 Jönköping	3 – 5; 0–2, 3–2, 0–1	(Germany) Eisbären Berlin	Eisarena Salzburg, Salzburg; Attendance: 1,400

Game reference
	Referees: Berneker Kurmann; Hofer Newerkla
Jesper Fasth (Pasi Puistola, Jukka Voutilainen) 26:13; Jesper Williamsson (Kris Beech) 26:43; Kamil Piros 35:23 / Goals / 11:50 Laurin Braun (Denis Pederson); 12:07 Jeff Friesen (André Rankel); 21:54 Jeff Friesen (Derrick Walser, André Rankel); 26:58 Jimmy Sharrow (Mads Christensen, Sven Felski); 59:05 Stefan Ustorf (empty net)	Referees: Berneker Kurmann; Hofer Newerkla

=== Statistics ===
==== Scoring leaders ====
Player	Team	GP	G	A	PIM	Pts
(Germany) Stefan Ustorf	(Germany) Eisbären Berlin	3	4	1	0	5
(Sweden) André Petersson	(Sweden) HV71 Jönköping	3	3	2	0	5
(Canada) Brett McLean	(Switzerland) SC Bern	3	3	2	4	5
(Canada) Jeff Friesen	(Germany) Eisbären Berlin	3	3	1	0	4
(Sweden) Christian Berglund	(Sweden) Färjestads BK	3	2	2	0	4
(Germany) André Rankel	(Germany) Eisbären Berlin	3	2	2	2	4
(Finland) Sami Venäläinen	(Finland) TPS	3	3	0	0	3
(Canada) Danny Bois	(Austria) EC Red Bull Salzburg	3	3	0	2	3
(Austria) Manuel Latusa	(Austria) EC Red Bull Salzburg	3	3	0	4	3
(Canada) Ryan Duncan	(Austria) EC Red Bull Salzburg	3	2	1	0	3

==== Leading goaltenders ====
Player	Team	GP	GAA	Sv%
(Switzerland) Olivier Gigon	(Switzerland) SC Bern	1	1.00	.964
(Germany) Rob Zepp	(Germany) Eisbären Berlin	3	1.67	.932
(Sweden) Daniel Larsson	(Sweden) HV71 Jönköping	2	3.30	.914
(Czech Republic) Alexander Salák	(Sweden) Färjestads BK	1	2.03	.909
(Finland) Tomi Karhunen	(Finland) Kärpät	1	3.00	.906
(Sweden) Andreas Andersson	(Sweden) HV71 Jönköping	2	3.43	.902
(Sweden) Cristopher Nihlstorp	(Sweden) Färjestads BK	2	3.50	.897
(Austria) Reinhard Divis	(Austria) Red Bull Salzburg	2	6.82	.896
(Switzerland) Marco Bührer	(Switzerland) SC Bern	2	2.50	.881
(Finland) Mikko Strömberg	(Finland) Jokerit	1	3.00	.875
(Canada) Dan LaCosta	(Austria) Red Bull Salzburg	2	7.33	.732
(Finland) Petri Koivisto	(Finland) Kärpät	2	2.00	—
(Finland) Mika Järvinen	(Finland) Jokerit	2	2.00	—
(Finland) Atte Engren	(Finland) TPS	3	4.33	—

== Final standings ==
Gold medal	(Germany) Eisbären Berlin
Silver medal	(Sweden) HV71 Jönköping
Bronze medal	(Switzerland) SC Bern
4	(Sweden) Färjestads BK
5	(Finland) Jokerit
6	(Finland) Oulun Kärpät
7	(Finland) TPS
8	(Austria) Red Bull Salzburg

== See also ==
- 2010 European Trophy Junior
