= Olander =

Olander or Ölander is a Swedish surname. Notable people with the surname include:

- Alice Olander (1910–1996), American politician
- Arne Ölander (1902–1984), Swedish chemist
- Cliff Olander (born 1955), American football player
- Emelie Ölander (born 1989), Swedish international female football player
- Jere Ölander (born 1989), Finnish professional ice hockey defender
- Jim Olander (born 1963), American Major League Baseball player
- Jimmy Olander (born 1961), American guitarist and banjo player for the American band Diamond Rio
- Joan Lucille Olander (born 1931), birthname of American film actress Mamie Van Doren
- Mårten Olander (born 1971), Swedish professional golfer
- Mikael Olander (born 1963), Swedish decathlete and former Olympic competitor
- Milton Olander, (1899–1961), American football player and coach
- Rolf Olander (1934–2023), Swedish Olympic swimmer
- Ronny Olander (born 1949), Swedish politician
- Tom Ölander (1954–2002), Finnish pioneer in fandom culture
- Victor Olander (1873–1949), American labor union leader

== See also ==
- Marcus Falk-Olander (born 1987), Swedish footballer
- Elsi Hetemäki-Olander (born 1927), Finnish politician
- Maaren Olander-Doyle (born 1975), Estonian footballer
