= Gigon =

Gigon is a surname. Notable people with the surname include:

- Didier Gigon (born 1968), Swiss former footballer
- Michaela Gigon (born 1977), Austrian mountain bike orienteer and several times world champion
- Michel Gigon (1929–2022), French painter, stained-glass window designer
- Norm Gigon (1938–2013), Major League Baseball utility player
- Olivier Gigon (born 1979), Swiss professional ice hockey goaltender

== See also ==
- Papilio gigon, butterfly of the family Papilionidae
