= Andreas Hänni =

Andreas Hänni may refer to:

- Andreas Hänni (ice hockey)
- Andreas Hänni (curler)
