= Skalberg =

Skalberg is a surname of Swedish origin. Notable people with the surname include:

- Jens Skålberg (born 1985), Swedish ice hockey player
- Oscar Skalberg (1929–2006), Australian rules footballer

== See also ==
- Jesper Skalberg Karlsson (born 1993), Swedish politician
