= Denise Voïta =

Swiss painter, designer, lithographer, and tapestry designer

- Born: 14 March 1928; Marsens, Switzerland
- Died: 11 April 2008 (aged 80); Lausanne, Switzerland
- Known for: Painting, Textile Design

Denise Voïta (14 March 1928 – 11 April 2008) was a Swiss painter, designer, lithographer, and tapestry designer.

== Biography ==
Voïta was born on 14 March 1928 in Marsens, in the canton of Fribourg, the daughter of Pierre Voïtachevski, the director of the psychiatric hospital of Marsens, and Geneviève Dusseiller. Her father was Ukrainian while her mother was from Geneva. Voïta attended the École cantonale de dessin in Lausanne, in the applied arts section, from 1948 to 1952. Drawing remained her preferred means of expression, along with gouache and lithography.

In the 1950s, Voïta was associated with the Concrete art movement, along with her colleagues Jean-Claude Hesselbarth, Michel Gigon, Arthur Jobin, and Antoine Poncet. She produced around thirty tapestry cartoons from 1961 to 1986. Voïta participated in the Lausanne International Biennial of Tapestry in 1962 and 1987 and was a founding member of the Groupe des cartonniers-lissiers romands in 1967. She exhibited with the Collège vaudois des artistes concrets and the group of contemporary engravers L'Epreuve, and carried out several official commissions for public places. From 1975, Voïta lived in Lausanne and Annay-sur-Serein, France.

In 2002, Voïta was awarded the Grand Prix of the Fondation Vaudoise pour la Culture. She died on 11 April 2008 in Lausanne, aged 80.
