= Helenius =

Helenius is both a surname and a given name. Notable people with the name include:

== People with the surname ==
- Ari Helenius (born 1944), Finnish professor of biochemistry
- Jani-Petteri Helenius (born 1990), Finnish professional ice hockey player
- Juhani Helenius (born 1933), Finnish sprint canoeist
- Nicklas Helenius Jensen (born 1991), Danish professional football forward
- Riku Helenius (born 1988), ice hockey goaltender
- Robert Helenius (born 1984), Finnish professional boxer
- Sami Helenius (born 1974), ice hockey defenceman

== People with the given name ==
- Helenius Acron, Roman commentator and grammarian, probably of the 5th century
- Helenius de Cock (born 1835), instructor at the Theological School, Kampen, Overijssel, Netherlands

== See also ==
- Hilkka Rantaseppä-Helenius (1925–1975), Finnish astronomer
