= Joonas Donskoi =

Finnish ice hockey player (born 1992)

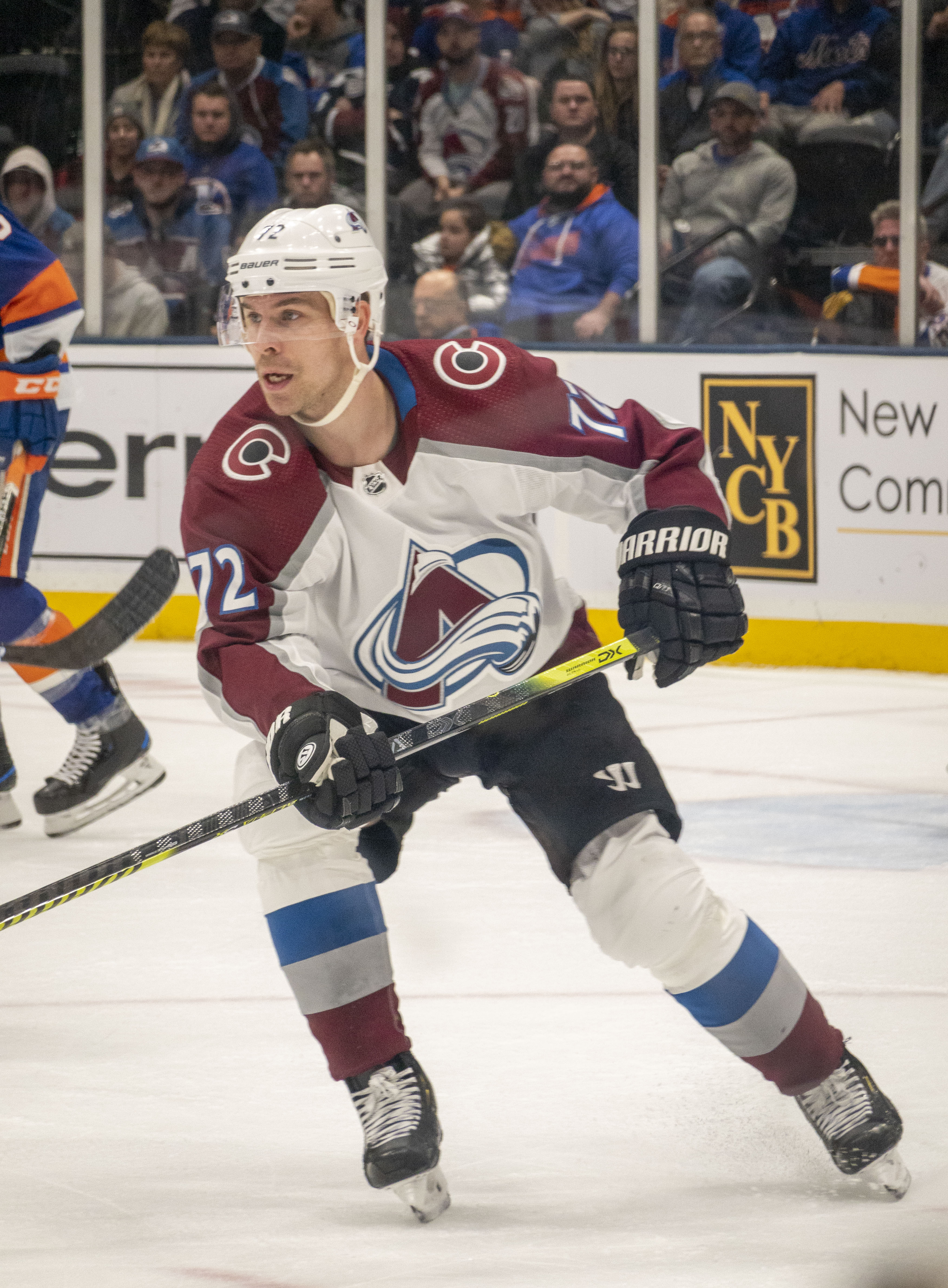
- Donskoi with the Colorado Avalanche in 2020
- Born: 13 April 1992 (age 34) Raahe, Finland
- Height: 6 ft 0 in (183 cm)
- Weight: 190 lb (86 kg; 13 st 8 lb)
- Position: Right wing
- Shot: Right
- Played for: Oulun Kärpät; San Jose Sharks; Colorado Avalanche; Seattle Kraken
- National team: Finland
- NHL draft: 99th overall, 2010; Florida Panthers
- Playing career: 2009–2023

Joonas Donskoi (Finnish: [ˈjoːnɑs ˈdonskoi]; born 13 April 1992) is a Finnish former professional ice hockey right wing. He was drafted 99th overall by the Florida Panthers in the 2010 NHL entry draft.

In 2009, he would play with the SM-sarja and SM-Liiga teams of Oulun Kärpät in Finland. In 2015, he would start play in the National Hockey League (NHL) with the San Jose Sharks. He would join the Colorado Avalanche in 2019 after signing with them as a free agent. Donskoi would be selected by the Seattle Kraken in the 2021 NHL expansion draft. In 2023, he would announce his retirement from professional hockey due to concussions. In total, Donskoi has played 474 NHL games.

Internationally, Donskoi has competed in the 2011 IIHF World U18 Championships, winning bronze, as well as the 2012 World Junior Ice Hockey Championships, 2015 IIHF World Championship, and 2016 World Cup of Hockey.

== Playing career ==
=== Oulun Kärpät (2007–2015) ===
Donskoi started playing junior hockey at the age of five with the team Teräs-Kieko in his hometown of Raahe. He moved to Oulu at the age of 15 and joined Oulun Kärpät's SM-sarja team for the 2007–08 season.

In April 2009, a 17-year-old Donskoi signed a three-year SM-Liiga contract with Kärpät. He made his Liiga debut during the 2009–10 season, on 11 September 2009, away against Kiekko-Espoo. Donskoi scored his first Liiga goal in his third game on 19 September 2009, against Jokerit. In November 2009, he injured his knee during practice and was out of action for a month. In the season, Donskoi played 18 regular season games with two goals and two assists for four points. Donskoi played the rest of the season in the SM-sarja, where he won the championship in the spring of 2010.

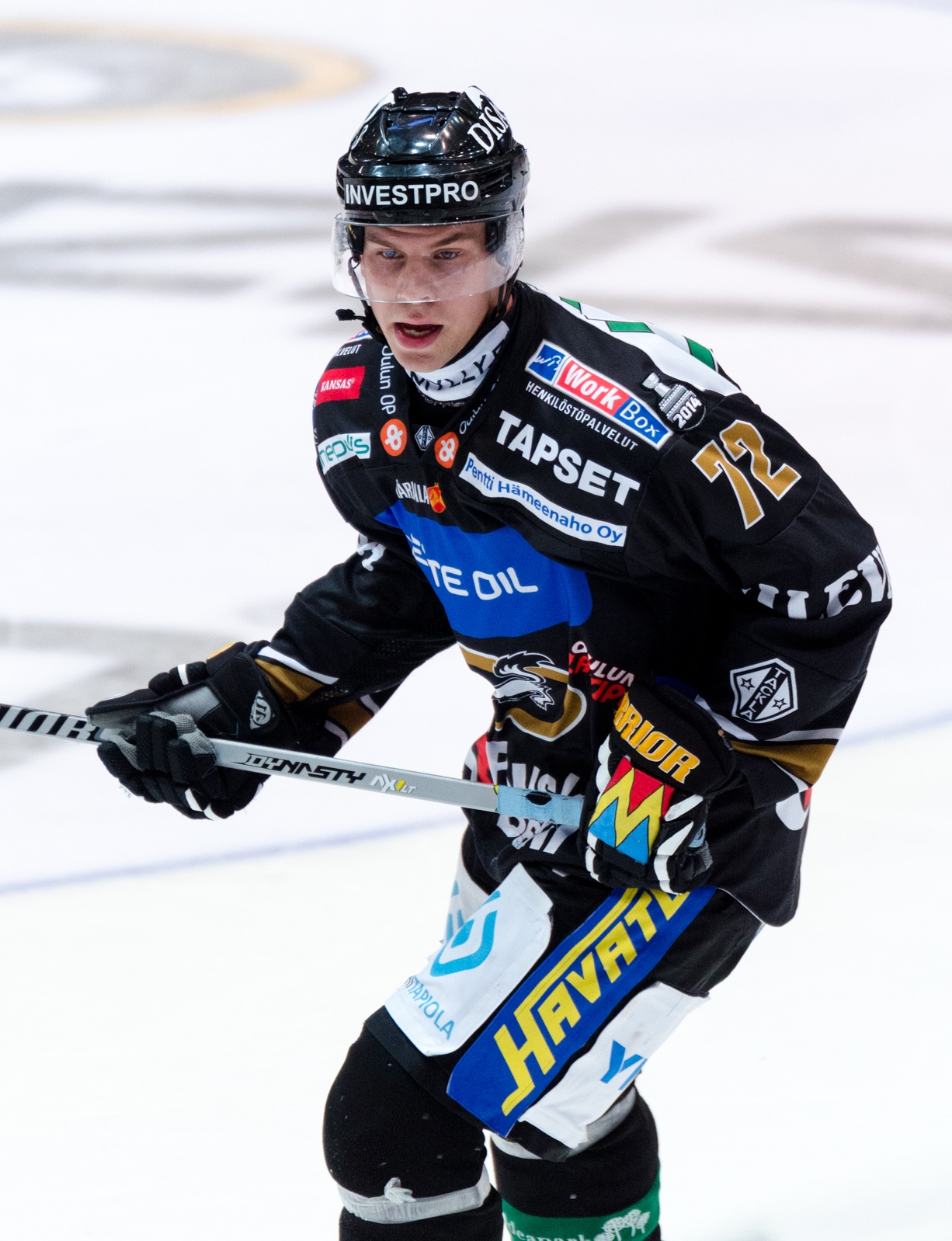
Donskoi during his tenure with Oulun Kärpät

Before the 2010 NHL entry draft, the NHL Central Scouting Bureau rated Donskoi as the 14th highest European forward. At the draft, the Florida Panthers selected him in the fourth round, 99th overall. Meanwhile, in the 2010 KHL Junior Draft, the Russian team Avangard Omsk drafted Donskoi 13th overall.

In his first full Liiga season, 2010–11, Donskoi finished fourth in points by Liiga rookies, after Jokerit's Teemu Pulkkinen and Antti Kerälä and Porin Ässät's Joel Armia. In January 2011, Donskoi signed a two-year contract extension with Kärpät.

The 2011–12 season was more difficult for Donskoi than the previous one, as he would suffer from the so-called "curse of the second season." Early in the season, Donskoi suffered from illness, so he would only manage ten points in the first 29 games. In February 2012, he used the option in his contract and signed a one-year contract extension with the team. Over the season, he would score a total of 25 points in 52 games. During the playoffs, Donskoi was one of the best from the Kärpät, as he would record three goals and three assists in six games.

Donskoi's 2012–13 season went worse than expected. In October, he injured his wrist and was sidelined for a month. Donskoi's playing level would remain low, and his NHL contract also expired during the season. In December 2012, Donskoi signed a contract extension with Kärpät until the spring of 2015.

During the 2013–14 season, Donskoi did better than the previous season in terms of scoring. He was Kärpät's third best scorer, notching 11 goals and 37 points. In February 2014, Donskoi signed a two-year contract extension with Kärpät. That season, Kärpät went on to win the gold medal in the playoffs.

For the 2014–15 season, Donskoi set his single-season Liiga points record with 19 goals and 49 points, making him Kärpät's best point and goal scorer. Donskoi shared fourth place in the Liiga's points standings with Tappara's Olli Palola. He led the playoff's plus-minus (+/-) rankings with a rating of +15 and ranked second in the points rankings with a +22 rating, ahead of his linemate Joonas Kemppainen. That season, Kärpät won the Finnish championship again and Donskoi was awarded the Jari Kurri Trophy for the being the playoff's most valuable player. Donskoi was also selected for the Liiga's All Star Team.

=== San Jose Sharks (2015–2019) ===
With his NHL rights relinquished by the Panthers, Donskoi was signed to a two-year, entry-level contract with the San Jose Sharks on 20 May 2015.

In his first training camp and preseason with the Sharks, Donskoi impressed and made the club's opening night roster for the 2015–16 season. Donskoi scored his first NHL goal in his first NHL game, 7 October 2015, against goaltender Jonathan Quick of the Los Angeles Kings. Donskoi surpassed expectations with the Sharks, cementing a regular roster position amongst the Sharks offense. In 76 games with San Jose, he compiled 11 goals and 25 assists for 36 points. Helping the Sharks reach the postseason, Donskoi appeared in every game, contributing with 12 points in 23 games as the club reached the Stanley Cup finals for the first time in franchise history. In Game 3 of the 2016 Stanley Cup Finals, Donskoi scored the game-winning goal in overtime, but the team lost the series in six games to the Pittsburgh Penguins.

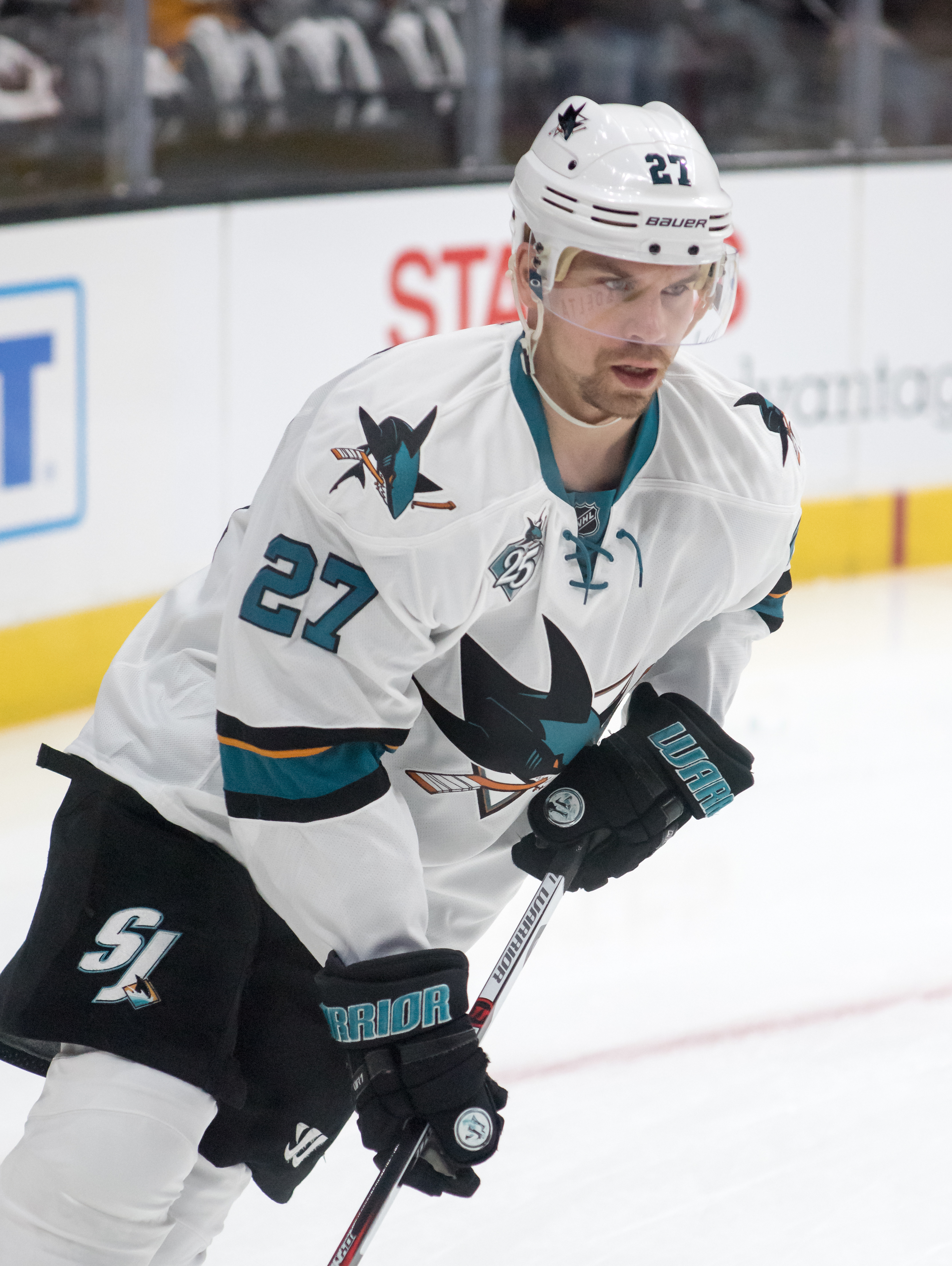
Donskoi during his tenure with the San Jose Sharks.

On 12 May 2017, the Sharks re-signed Donskoi to a two-year, $3.8 million contract. He would record 28 goals and 31 assists over the next two seasons with the Sharks before becoming a free agent.

=== Colorado Avalanche (2019–2021) ===
As a free agent from the Sharks, Donskoi signed a four-year, $15.6 million contract with the Colorado Avalanche on 1 July 2019. Acquired by the Avalanche to add scoring depth to the club's middle six forwards, Donskoi made his Avalanche debut on the opening night of the 2019–20 season, registering 2 goals in a 5–3 victory over the Calgary Flames on 3 October 2019. Showing versatility, Donskoi played primarily alongside Nazem Kadri and Andre Burakovsky, and notched his first career hat-trick in a 9–4 blowout victory over the Nashville Predators on 7 November 2019. He made his 300th NHL regular season appearance the following game against the Columbus Blue Jackets on 9 November. He compiled a career high 14 points through the month of November, recording a career-high four points (2 goals, 2 assists), playing on the top-line in a 5–2 win against the Chicago Blackhawks on 30 November. Donskoi recorded a career-high 16 goals and added 17 assists and 33 points in 65 games before the regular season was halted in March due to the COVID-19 pandemic. In the Avalanche's return to the playoffs, Donskoi added two goals in the round-robin stage and added 6 points in just 9 post-season games before missing the club's final 5 games to injury in a second-round defeat to the Dallas Stars.

In his second season with Colorado, with added depth brought into the Avalanche line-up, Donskoi was primarily used in a third-line role alongside Tyson Jost and Valeri Nichushkin for the pandemic delayed 2020–21 season. Donskoi began the season with an offensive burst, compiling 28 points through 35 games, including collecting his second career hat-trick, notching the fastest 3 goals to start a game in franchise history (7:31) in a 9–3 victory over the Arizona Coyotes on 31 March 2021. After missing 5 games through April in a COVID protocol related absence, Donskoi slowed in his production, finishing with a career high 17 goals while adding 31 points in 51 regular season games. In the opening round of the playoffs, Donskoi matched a career high of 3 points in a Game 2 victory over the St. Louis Blues on 19 May 2021. He collected five points in 10 playoff games, unable to help Colorado advance past the second round for the third consecutive year.

=== Seattle Kraken and retirement (2021–2023) ===
On 21 July 2021, Donskoi's tenure with Colorado was cut short when he was selected from the Avalanche at the 2021 NHL expansion draft by the Seattle Kraken. Donskoi struggled to find his offensive touch in the Kraken's inaugural season in 2021–22, posting only 2 goals and 20 assists for 22 points in 75 games.

In preparation for the 2022–23 season, Donskoi suffered a concussion after colliding during a preseason game with fellow Kraken player Kole Lind during a game against the Vancouver Canucks. After missing the entire season due to the concussion and its aftereffects, Donskoi announced his retirement on 27 August 2023.

== International play ==
In 2008 and 2009, Donskoi played in the World U-17 Hockey Challenge. He also competed in 2009 for the Hlinka Gretzky Cup.

Donskoi played in the IIHF World U18 Championship in 2010, winning the bronze medal.

Donskoi played in the IIHF World Junior Championship in 2011 and 2012, In the former, he was Finland's third best scorer three goals and six points. In the latter tournament, Donskoi served as an alternate captain for the team.

Donskoi would play senior internationally representing Finland during the 2015 IIHF World Championship. He was the team's best point collector and third best scorer with 5 goals and 8 points.

Medal record

Ice hockey

Representing Finland

IIHF World U18 Championship
| Bronze medal – third place | 2010 Belarus | |

On 2 March 2016, Donskoi was named to Team Finland's roster for the 2016 World Cup of Hockey.

== Personal life ==
Donskoi is one of six children; he has three brothers and two sisters. In his free time, he is interested in cars and skateboarding. After the 2019 Stanley Cup playoffs, he returned to Finland and paid off the debt of a skating park his childhood friend owned. He has Russian roots from his great-grandfather or grandfather.

== Career statistics ==
=== Regular season and playoffs ===
| | | | Regular season | | | | | Playoffs |
| Season | Team | League | GP | G | A | Pts | PIM | GP | G | A | Pts | PIM |
|---|---|---|---|---|---|---|---|---|---|---|---|---|
| 2007–08 | Kärpät | Jr. A | 21 | 9 | 14 | 23 | 26 | 5 | 3 | 4 | 7 | 0 |
| 2008–09 | Kärpät | Jr. A | 32 | 7 | 17 | 24 | 12 | — | — | — | — | — |
| 2009–10 | Kärpät | Jr. A | 18 | 14 | 15 | 29 | 2 | 12 | 5 | 10 | 15 | 4 |
| 2009–10 | Kärpät | SM-l | 18 | 2 | 2 | 4 | 4 | — | — | — | — | — |
| 2010–11 | Kärpät | SM-l | 52 | 16 | 11 | 27 | 10 | 3 | 1 | 0 | 1 | 0 |
| 2011–12 | Kärpät | SM-l | 52 | 8 | 17 | 25 | 12 | 6 | 3 | 3 | 6 | 0 |
| 2012–13 | Kärpät | SM-l | 31 | 4 | 10 | 14 | 8 | 3 | 0 | 1 | 1 | 2 |
| 2013–14 | Kärpät | SM-I | 60 | 11 | 26 | 37 | 10 | 16 | 4 | 2 | 6 | 4 |
| 2014–15 | Kärpät | SM-I | 58 | 19 | 30 | 49 | 10 | 19 | 6 | 16 | 22 | 6 |
| 2015–16 | San Jose Sharks | NHL | 76 | 11 | 25 | 36 | 20 | 24 | 6 | 6 | 12 | 4 |
| 2016–17 | San Jose Sharks | NHL | 61 | 6 | 11 | 17 | 10 | 5 | 0 | 2 | 2 | 0 |
| 2017–18 | San Jose Sharks | NHL | 66 | 14 | 18 | 32 | 26 | 9 | 2 | 2 | 4 | 0 |
| 2018–19 | San Jose Sharks | NHL | 80 | 14 | 23 | 37 | 10 | 12 | 1 | 2 | 3 | 4 |
| 2019–20 | Colorado Avalanche | NHL | 65 | 16 | 17 | 33 | 26 | 9 | 3 | 3 | 6 | 2 |
| 2020–21 | Colorado Avalanche | NHL | 51 | 17 | 14 | 31 | 10 | 10 | 3 | 2 | 5 | 0 |
| 2021–22 | Seattle Kraken | NHL | 75 | 2 | 20 | 22 | 14 | — | — | — | — | — |
| Liiga totals | | | 351 | 74 | 119 | 193 | 64 | 47 | 14 | 22 | 36 | 12 |
| NHL totals | | | 474 | 80 | 128 | 208 | 116 | 69 | 15 | 17 | 32 | 10 |

=== International ===
| Year | Team | Event | Result | GP | G | A | Pts | PIM |
|---|---|---|---|---|---|---|---|---|
| 2008 | Finland | U17 | 6th | 5 | 1 | 0 | 1 | 2 |
| 2009 | Finland | U17 | 10th | 5 | 1 | 5 | 6 | 0 |
| 2010 | Finland | U18 | 3rd place, bronze medalist(s) | 6 | 1 | 7 | 8 | 0 |
| 2011 | Finland | WJC | 6th | 6 | 3 | 3 | 6 | 2 |
| 2012 | Finland | WJC | 4th | 7 | 2 | 3 | 5 | 0 |
| 2015 | Finland | WC | 6th | 8 | 5 | 3 | 8 | 0 |
| 2016 | Finland | WCH | 8th | 3 | 0 | 0 | 0 | 0 |
| Junior totals | | | | 29 | 8 | 18 | 26 | 4 |
| Senior totals | | | | 11 | 5 | 3 | 8 | 0 |

== Awards and honours ==
| Award | Year |
|---|---|
Liiga
| Kanada-malja (Oulun Kärpät) | 2014, 2015 |
| All-Star Team | 2015 |
| Jari Kurri Trophy (Playoff MVP) | 2015 |

Awards and achievements
| Preceded by Juhamatti Aaltonen | Jari Kurri Trophy Winner; 2014–15 | Succeeded by Patrik Laine |
