= Kamil Kreps =

Czech professional ice hockey player (born 1984)

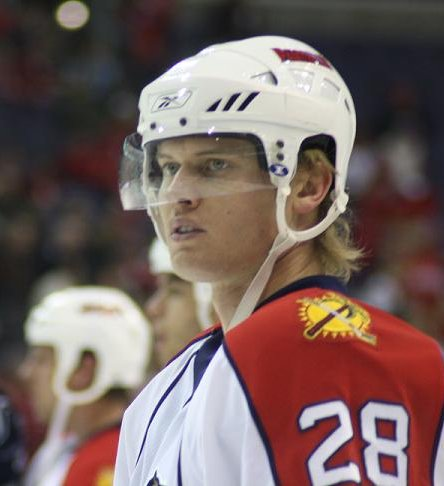
- Born: November 18, 1984 (age 41) Litoměřice, Czechoslovakia
- Height: 6 ft 2 in (188 cm)
- Weight: 194 lb (88 kg; 13 st 12 lb)
- Position: Centre
- Shot: Right
- Played for: Florida Panthers; Oulun Kärpät; Barys Astana; Kloten Flyers; Ässät Pori; HC Oceláři Třinec; Grizzlys Wolfsburg
- NHL draft: 38th overall, 2003; Florida Panthers
- Playing career: 2007–2018

Kamil Kreps (born November 18, 1984) is a Czech former professional ice hockey player who played in the National Hockey League (NHL).

== Playing career ==
As a youth, Kreps played in the 1998 Quebec International Pee-Wee Hockey Tournament with a team from Chomutov.

Kreps played his junior hockey in the Ontario Hockey League (OHL) playing for the Brampton Battalion for three seasons. He scored 19 goals in each of his three seasons and had a high of 61 points in 2002–03. He was drafted in the second round, 38th overall, by the Florida Panthers in the 2003 NHL entry draft.

In the 2006-07 season, he played his first NHL game with the Panthers on January 7, 2007, against the Vancouver Canucks, registering two shots on net. Kreps scored his first NHL goal on April 6 against the Tampa Bay Lightning.

In the 2010 European Trophy tournament, Kreps won the scoring league while with Oulun Kärpät in the regulation round, totalling 11 points (5 goals, 6 assists) in 8 games.

After four European seasons abroad, Kreps opted to return to his native Czech Republic in signing a one-year deal with HC Oceláři Třinec on May 1, 2014.

On February 12, 2012, he scored his first international goal for the Czech Republic during their 4–0 win over Russia in the 2012 European Hockey Tournament.

== Career statistics ==
=== Regular season and playoffs ===
			Regular season					Playoffs
Season	Team	League	GP	G	A	Pts	PIM	GP	G	A	Pts	PIM
1999–2000	HC Chemopetrol, a.s.	CZE U18	48	18	16	34	10	—	—	—	—	—
2000–01	HC Chemopetrol, a.s.	CZE U18	3	4	3	7	2	6	2	6	8	10
2000–01	HC Chemopetrol, a.s.	CZE U20	44	12	20	32	4	—	—	—	—	—
2001–02	Brampton Battalion	OHL	68	19	24	43	14	—	—	—	—	—
2002–03	Brampton Battalion	OHL	53	19	42	61	12	11	3	5	8	4
2003–04	Brampton Battalion	OHL	59	19	27	46	19	12	7	8	15	2
2004–05	San Antonio Rampage	AHL	58	5	6	11	11	—	—	—	—	—
2004–05	Texas Wildcatters	ECHL	12	5	6	11	6	—	—	—	—	—
2005–06	Rochester Americans	AHL	61	13	19	32	20	—	—	—	—	—
2006–07	Florida Panthers	NHL	14	1	1	2	6	—	—	—	—	—
2006–07	Rochester Americans	AHL	50	14	21	35	16	6	1	0	1	0
2007–08	Florida Panthers	NHL	76	8	17	25	29	—	—	—	—	—
2007–08	Rochester Americans	AHL	6	1	5	6	6	—	—	—	—	—
2008–09	Florida Panthers	NHL	66	4	15	19	18	—	—	—	—	—
2009–10	Florida Panthers	NHL	75	5	9	14	18	—	—	—	—	—
2010–11	Kärpät	SM-l	55	14	15	29	43	3	1	1	2	0
2011–12	Barys Astana	KHL	52	9	20	29	23	7	1	3	4	4
2012–13	Kloten Flyers	NLA	22	2	4	6	2	—	—	—	—	—
2013–14	Ässät	Liiga	39	5	11	16	20	—	—	—	—	—
2014–15	HC Oceláři Třinec	ELH	39	5	20	25	24	4	0	0	0	4
2015–16	HC Oceláři Třinec	ELH	9	2	0	2	4	1	0	0	0	0
2016–17	HC Oceláři Třinec	ELH	46	9	15	24	24	6	0	3	3	2
2017–18	Grizzlys Wolfsburg	DEL	31	12	10	22	10	4	0	0	0	4
AHL totals			175	33	51	84	53	6	1	0	1	0
NHL totals			232	18	42	60	71	—	—	—	—	—

=== International ===
Year	Team	Event	GP	G	A	Pts	PIM
2002	Czech Republic	WJC18	8	3	2	5	6
2004	Czech Republic	WJC	7	0	0	0	0
Junior totals			15	3	2	5	6
