= Miika Huczkowski =

Finnish ice hockey player

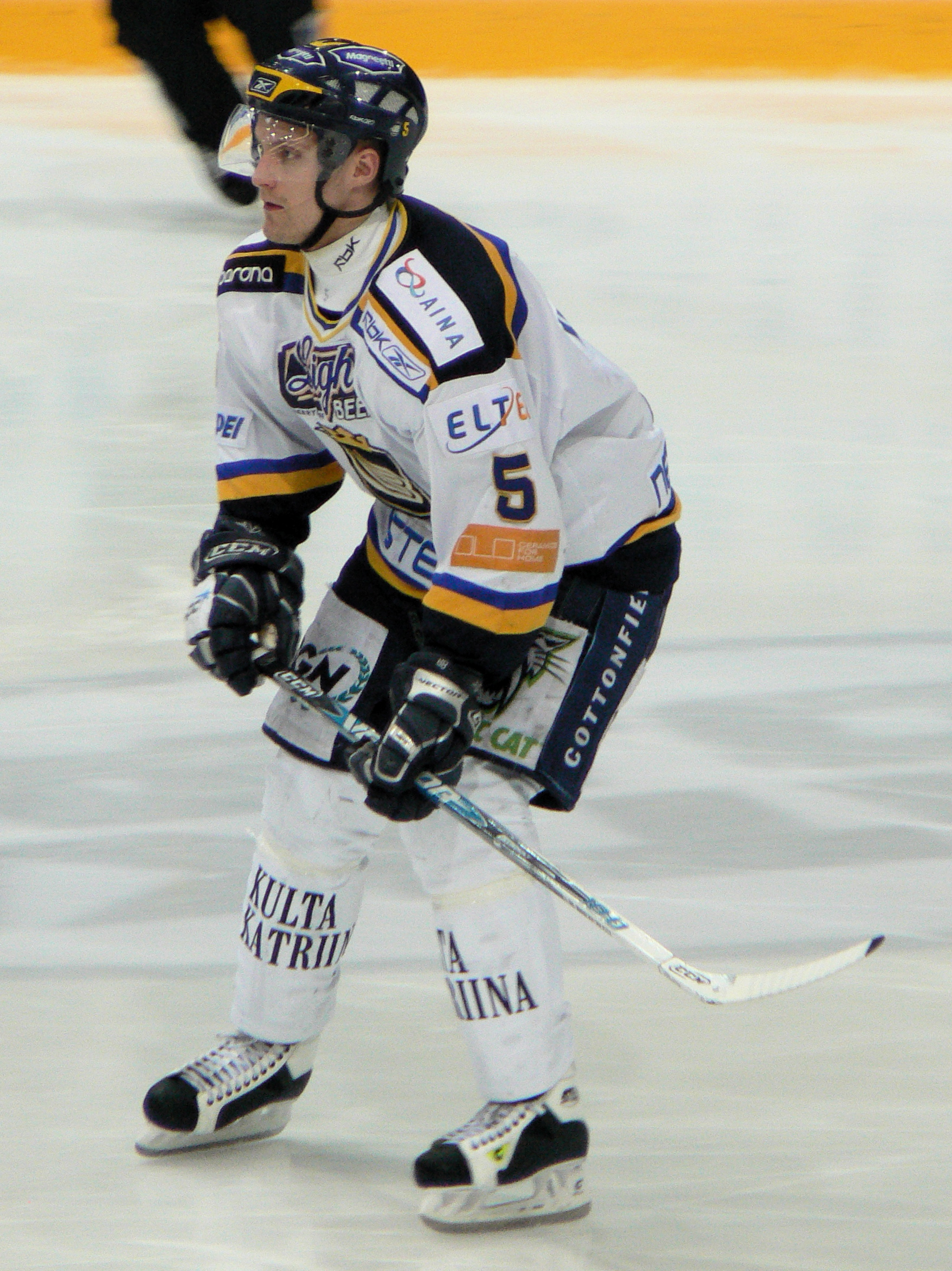
- Born: August 25, 1982 (age 42); Jyväskylä, Finland
- Height: 6 ft 0 in (183 cm)
- Weight: 196 lb (89 kg; 14 st 0 lb)
- Position: Defence
- Shot: Left
- Played for: JYP Jyväskylä; Blues Espoo; TPS
- NHL draft: Undrafted
- Playing career: 2001–2012

Miika Huczkowski (born August 25, 1982) is a Finnish former ice hockey player who played professionally in Finland for JYP Jyväskylä, Blues Espoo and TPS of the SM-liiga from season of 2001 until season of 2012.

== Career statistics ==
			Regular season					Playoffs
Season	Team	League	GP	G	A	Pts	PIM	GP	G	A	Pts	PIM
1997–98	JYP U16	Jr. C SM-sarja	2	1	0	1	0	—	—	—	—	—
1997–98	JYP U18	Jr. B SM-sarja	27	4	8	12	2	5	0	1	1	0
2000–01	JYP U20	Jr. A SM-liiga	25	2	7	9	16	5	0	1	1	0
2001–02	JYP U20	Jr. A SM-liiga	30	6	3	9	38	3	0	2	2	2
2001–02	JYP	Liiga	11	0	0	0	4	—	—	—	—	—
2002–03	JYP	Liiga	50	0	5	5	16	7	0	2	2	12
2003–04	JYP	Liiga	34	0	3	3	12	2	0	0	0	2
2004–05	JYP	Liiga	34	2	2	4	30	3	0	0	0	2
2005–06	JYP	Liiga	48	6	4	10	32	3	0	1	1	4
2006–07	JYP	Liiga	41	1	3	4	44	—	—	—	—	—
2007–08	Blues	Liiga	47	1	2	3	22	9	0	0	0	6
2008–09	Blues	Liiga	38	1	7	8	48	8	0	1	1	2
2009–10	Blues	Liiga	46	4	11	15	22	3	0	0	0	4
2010–11	TPS	Liiga	2	0	0	0	2	—	—	—	—	—
2011–12	TPS	Liiga	3	0	1	1	0	—	—	—	—	—
Liiga totals			345	15	38	53	232	35	0	4	4	32
