= Markus Palmroth =

Finnish ice hockey player

- Born: January 25, 1989 (age 36); Turku, Finland
- Height: 6 ft 1 in (185 cm)
- Weight: 183 lb (83 kg; 13 st 1 lb)
- Position: Defence
- Shoots: Left
- Liiga team: HC TPS
- NHL draft: Undrafted
- Playing career: 2009–present

Markus Palmroth (born January 25, 1989) is a Finnish ice hockey defenceman. He is currently playing with HC TPS in the Finnish Liiga.

Palmroth made his SM-liiga debut playing with HC TPS during the 2010–11 season.
