= Kimmo Koskenkorva =

Finnish ice hockey player (born 1978)

- Born: 21 June 1978 (age 46); Haukipudas, Finland
- Height: 5 ft 8 in (173 cm)
- Weight: 172 lb (78 kg; 12 st 4 lb)
- Position: Left wing/Right Wing
- Shot: Left
- SM-liiga team Former teams: Retired; Kärpät (SM-liiga); Tappara (SM-liiga); SaiPa (SM-liiga); Skellefteå AIK (SEL)
- Playing career: 2000–2014

Kimmo Koskenkorva (born 21 June 1978) is a Finnish former professional ice hockey player who played for Kärpät team in the Finnish Liiga. His last team was second tier Peliitat for season 2013–14.

== Career statistics ==
| | | | Regular season | | | | | Playoffs |
| Season | Team | League | GP | G | A | Pts | PIM | GP | G | A | Pts | PIM |
|---|---|---|---|---|---|---|---|---|---|---|---|---|
| 1993–94 | Kärpät U16 | Jr. C SM-sarja | 31 | 19 | 13 | 32 | 6 | 4 | 1 | 1 | 2 | 0 |
| 1994–95 | Kärpät U18 | Jr. B SM-sarja | 24 | 5 | 6 | 11 | 24 | — | — | — | — | — |
| 1995–96 | Kärpät U18 | Jr. B SM-sarja | 2 | 2 | 0 | 2 | 0 | — | — | — | — | — |
| 1995–96 | Kärpät U20 | Jr. A SM-liiga | 33 | 10 | 10 | 20 | 12 | — | — | — | — | — |
| 1995–96 | Kärpät | I-Divisioona | 1 | 0 | 0 | 0 | 0 | — | — | — | — | — |
| 1996–97 | Kärpät U20 | Jr. A SM-liiga | 36 | 19 | 9 | 28 | 24 | — | — | — | — | — |
| 1997–98 | Kärpät U20 | Jr. A SM-liiga | 6 | 5 | 7 | 12 | 12 | — | — | — | — | — |
| 1997–98 | Kärpät | I-Divisioona | 32 | 9 | 8 | 17 | 8 | 14 | 1 | 1 | 2 | 8 |
| 1998–99 | Kärpät U20 | Jr. A SM-liiga | 1 | 1 | 0 | 1 | 2 | — | — | — | — | — |
| 1998–99 | Kärpät | I-Divisioona | 47 | 15 | 11 | 26 | 47 | 5 | 2 | 0 | 2 | 4 |
| 1999–00 | Kärpät | I-Divisioona | 46 | 10 | 9 | 19 | 40 | — | — | — | — | — |
| 2000–01 | Kärpät | Liiga | 55 | 8 | 3 | 11 | 6 | 9 | 0 | 0 | 0 | 2 |
| 2001–02 | Kärpät | Liiga | 51 | 9 | 12 | 21 | 16 | — | — | — | — | — |
| 2002–03 | Tappara | Liiga | 55 | 1 | 6 | 7 | 18 | 15 | 1 | 2 | 3 | 4 |
| 2003–04 | Tappara | Liiga | 41 | 10 | 3 | 13 | 12 | — | — | — | — | — |
| 2004–05 | Tappara | Liiga | 53 | 3 | 6 | 9 | 42 | 8 | 0 | 0 | 0 | 4 |
| 2005–06 | SaiPa | Liiga | 47 | 11 | 20 | 31 | 42 | 8 | 1 | 2 | 3 | 4 |
| 2006–07 | SaiPa | Liiga | 55 | 19 | 23 | 42 | 46 | — | — | — | — | — |
| 2007–08 | Skellefteå AIK | SHL | 55 | 10 | 9 | 19 | 36 | 5 | 0 | 2 | 2 | 4 |
| 2008–09 | Skellefteå AIK | SHL | 55 | 10 | 14 | 24 | 20 | 11 | 2 | 0 | 2 | 4 |
| 2009–10 | Kärpät | Liiga | 58 | 7 | 12 | 19 | 28 | 7 | 0 | 0 | 0 | 2 |
| 2010–11 | Kärpät | Liiga | 58 | 11 | 12 | 23 | 28 | 3 | 0 | 2 | 2 | 2 |
| 2011–12 | Kärpät | Liiga | 59 | 17 | 14 | 31 | 24 | 9 | 2 | 1 | 3 | 8 |
| 2012–13 | Lukko | Liiga | 48 | 1 | 4 | 5 | 18 | 14 | 1 | 0 | 1 | 0 |
| 2013–14 | Lahti Pelicans | Liiga | 35 | 5 | 7 | 12 | 12 | 6 | 0 | 0 | 0 | 2 |
| 2013–14 | Peliitat Heinola | Mestis | 1 | 0 | 0 | 0 | 0 | — | — | — | — | — |
| 2014–15 | Uleåborg A.I.K | 2. Divisioona | 12 | 8 | 15 | 23 | 12 | 4 | 8 | 3 | 11 | 2 |
| 2015–16 | Uleåborg A.I.K | Suomi-sarja | 8 | 5 | 3 | 8 | 2 | 2 | 1 | 0 | 1 | 6 |
| Liiga totals | | | 615 | 102 | 122 | 224 | 292 | 79 | 5 | 7 | 12 | 28 |
