= Alice Olander =

American politician (1910–1996)

- Olander c. 1946

Member of the Connecticut House of Representatives from Marlborough
- In office 1943–1947
- Preceded by: George Levin
- Succeeded by: Roy F. Fuller

Personal details
- Born: Alice Swanie Nall; October 22, 1910 Hardin County, Kentucky, U.S.
- Died: August 11, 1996 (aged 85) Cobalt, Connecticut, U.S.
- Party: Democratic
- Spouse: John F. Olander
- Children: 1

Alice Swanie Olander (October 22, 1910 – August 11, 1996) was an American politician who served in the Connecticut House of Representatives from 1943 to 1947, representing the town of Marlborough as a Democrat.

== Personal life ==
Alice Swanie Nall was born on October 22, 1910, in Hardin County, Kentucky, (Note: Olander's birthplace is reported as Vine Grove, Kentucky, in the Connecticut State Register and Manual, and Rineyville, Kentucky, in obituaries. Both are located in Hardin County.) to W. Howard and Bertha D. Nall. She married John F. Olander and had a daughter. John died in 1961.

== Political career ==
Olander was first elected to the Connecticut House of Representatives in 1942 and served two terms representing the town of Marlborough as a Democrat. She ran for reelection in 1946, but was defeated by Republican candidate Roy F. Fuller.

== Death ==
Olander died on August 11, 1996, in Cobalt, Connecticut. She was 85.
