= Mario Fischer =

Austrian ice hockey player (born 1989)

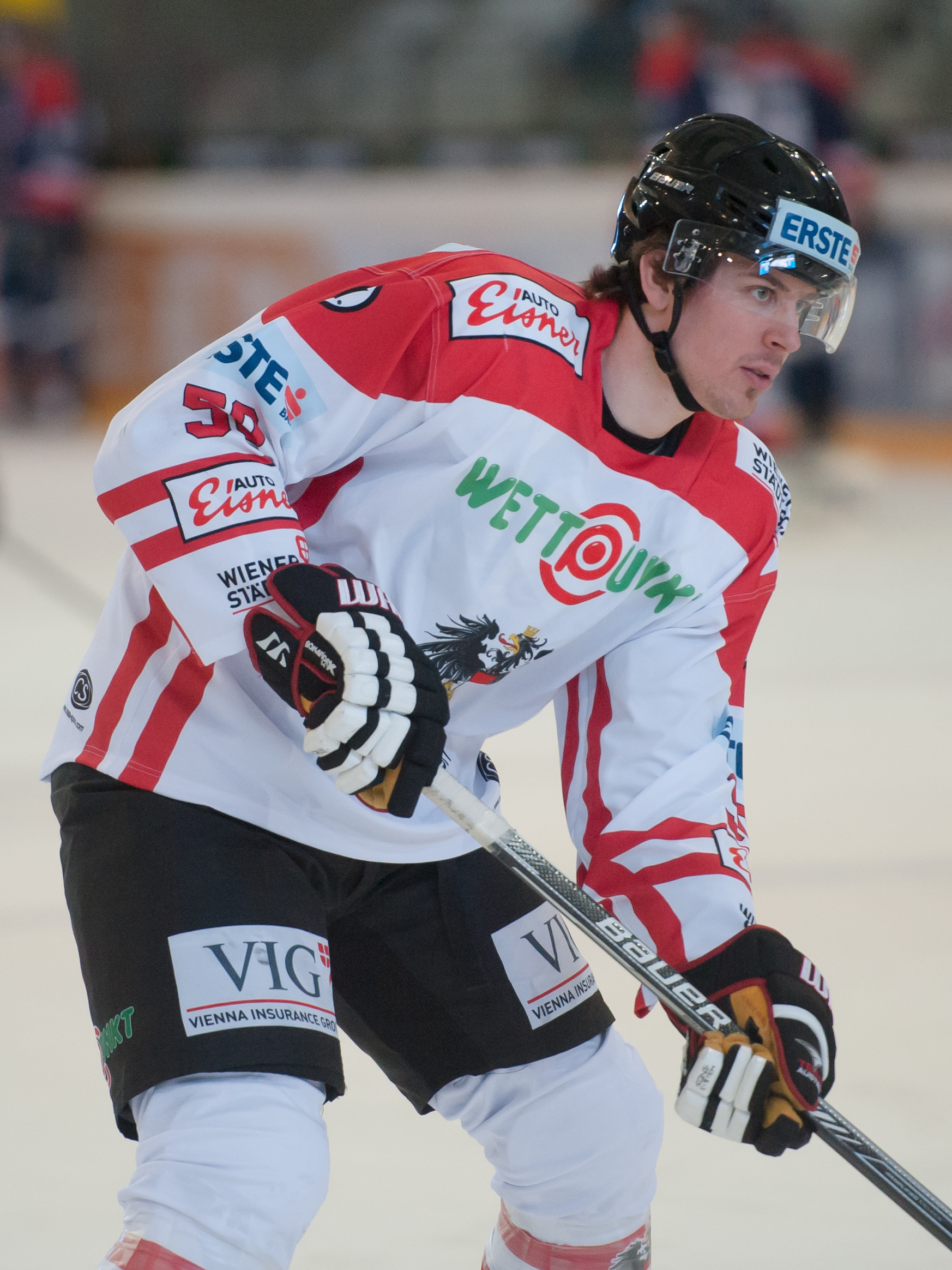
- Born: May 5, 1989 (age 36) Vienna, Austria
- Height: 6 ft 2 in (188 cm)
- Weight: 198 lb (90 kg; 14 st 2 lb)
- Position: Forward
- Shoots: Left
- ICEHL team Former teams: Vienna Capitals; SaPKo; EC Red Bull Salzburg
- National team: Austria
- Playing career: 2005–present

Mario Fischer (born May 5, 1989) is an Austrian ice hockey player for Vienna Capitals in the ICE Hockey League (ICEHL). He joined the Capitals from EC Red Bull Salzburg on April 26, 2011. He participated with the Austrian national teamat the 2015 IIHF World Championship.
