= Sami Venäläinen =

Finnish ice hockey player

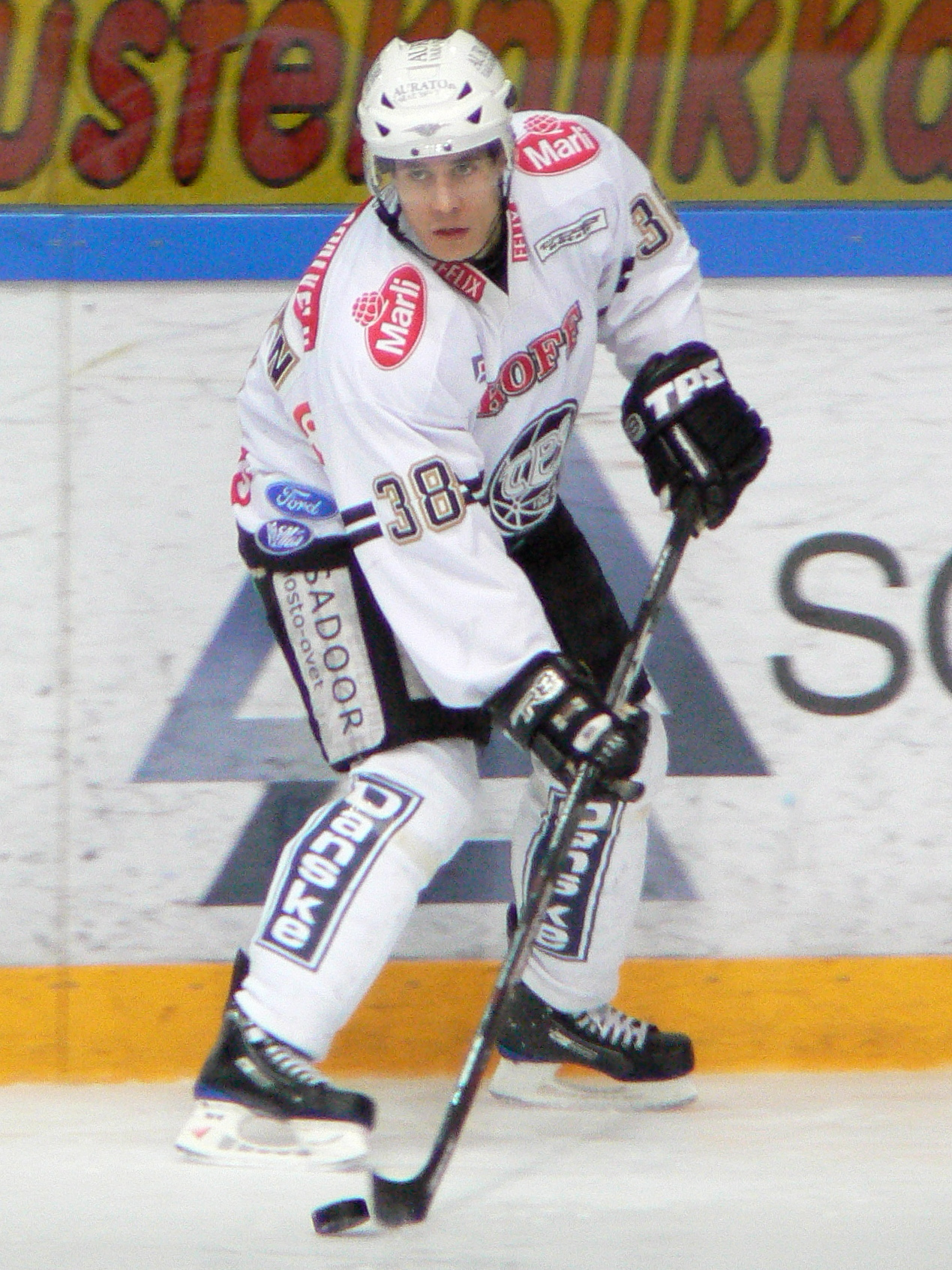
- Born: 14 October 1981 (age 44) Kangasala, Finland
- Height: 5 ft 11 in (180 cm)
- Weight: 187 lb (85 kg; 13 st 5 lb)
- Position: Right wing
- Shot: Right
- DEL team Former teams: Fischtown Pinguins; Tappara; TPS; SaiPa
- NHL draft: 249th overall, 2000; Phoenix Coyotes
- Playing career: 2000–2016

Sami Venäläinen (born 14 October 1981) is a Finnish professional ice hockey player who currently plays professionally in Germany for the Fischtown Pinguins.

== Career ==
Venäläinen is a product of the Tappara youth system and logged his first minutes for the club's men's team in the Liiga, the highest level professional competition in Finland, during the 2000–01 season. In 2008, he left Tappara and embarked on a three-year stint with fellow Liiga side HC TPS. In 2011, he was back at Tappara and spent another two season with the team. From 2013 to 2016, he played for SaiPa.

After 16 years in the Finnish top-tier, Venäläinen took his game abroad and on July 3, 2016, was signed by the Fischtown Pinguins of the German top-flight Deutsche Eishockey Liga (DEL).

== Career statistics ==
=== Regular season and playoffs ===
| | | | Regular season | | | | | Playoffs |
| Season | Team | League | GP | G | A | Pts | PIM | GP | G | A | Pts | PIM |
|---|---|---|---|---|---|---|---|---|---|---|---|---|
| 1997–98 | Tappara | FIN U18 | 33 | 18 | 7 | 25 | 12 | — | — | — | — | — |
| 1998–99 | Tappara | FIN U18 | 31 | 27 | 17 | 44 | 45 | — | — | — | — | — |
| 1998–99 | Tappara | FIN U20 | 10 | 3 | 2 | 5 | 29 | — | — | — | — | — |
| 1999–2000 | Tappara | FIN U20 | 37 | 8 | 9 | 17 | 18 | 10 | 3 | 4 | 7 | 6 |
| 2000–01 | Tappara | FIN U20 | 21 | 6 | 13 | 19 | 12 | 9 | 3 | 1 | 4 | 0 |
| 2000–01 | Tappara | SM-liiga | 36 | 0 | 1 | 1 | 2 | 1 | 0 | 0 | 0 | 0 |
| 2001–02 | Tappara | SM-liiga | 56 | 5 | 8 | 13 | 24 | 10 | 0 | 1 | 1 | 8 |
| 2002–03 | Tappara | SM-liiga | 55 | 5 | 9 | 14 | 48 | 13 | 0 | 0 | 0 | 10 |
| 2003–04 | Tappara | SM-liiga | 56 | 18 | 15 | 33 | 22 | 3 | 1 | 0 | 1 | 0 |
| 2004–05 | Tappara | SM-liiga | 55 | 5 | 6 | 11 | 32 | 8 | 1 | 2 | 3 | 6 |
| 2005–06 | Tappara | SM-liiga | 56 | 10 | 12 | 22 | 48 | 6 | 1 | 0 | 1 | 12 |
| 2006–07 | Tappara | SM-liiga | 54 | 14 | 7 | 21 | 67 | 5 | 0 | 0 | 0 | 4 |
| 2007–08 | Tappara | SM-liiga | 54 | 16 | 8 | 24 | 52 | 11 | 0 | 2 | 2 | 10 |
| 2008–09 | TPS | SM-liiga | 56 | 7 | 18 | 25 | 42 | 8 | 1 | 3 | 4 | 6 |
| 2009–10 | TPS | SM-liiga | 43 | 10 | 10 | 20 | 66 | 15 | 1 | 6 | 7 | 4 |
| 2010–11 | TPS | SM-liiga | 58 | 10 | 24 | 34 | 32 | — | — | — | — | — |
| 2011–12 | Tappara | SM-liiga | 58 | 8 | 17 | 25 | 55 | — | — | — | — | — |
| 2012–13 | Tappara | SM-liiga | 30 | 3 | 4 | 7 | 26 | 10 | 2 | 0 | 2 | 6 |
| 2012–13 | LeKi | Mestis | 8 | 3 | 2 | 5 | 2 | — | — | — | — | — |
| 2013–14 | LeKi | Mestis | 11 | 4 | 5 | 9 | 2 | — | — | — | — | — |
| 2013–14 | SaiPa | Liiga | 45 | 3 | 12 | 15 | 49 | 13 | 1 | 1 | 2 | 2 |
| 2014–15 | SaiPa | Liiga | 58 | 4 | 9 | 13 | 38 | 7 | 1 | 1 | 2 | 2 |
| 2015–16 | SaiPa | Liiga | 59 | 10 | 14 | 24 | 49 | 6 | 1 | 1 | 2 | 2 |
| Liiga totals | | | 829 | 128 | 174 | 302 | 652 | 116 | 10 | 17 | 27 | 72 |

=== International ===
| Year | Team | Event | GP | G | A | Pts | PIM |
|---|---|---|---|---|---|---|---|
| 1999 | Finland | WJC18 | 7 | 0 | 3 | 3 | 2 |
| 2001 | Finland | WJC | 7 | 1 | 1 | 2 | 0 |
| Junior totals | | | 14 | 1 | 4 | 5 | 2 |
