= Marko Luomala =

Finnish ice hockey player

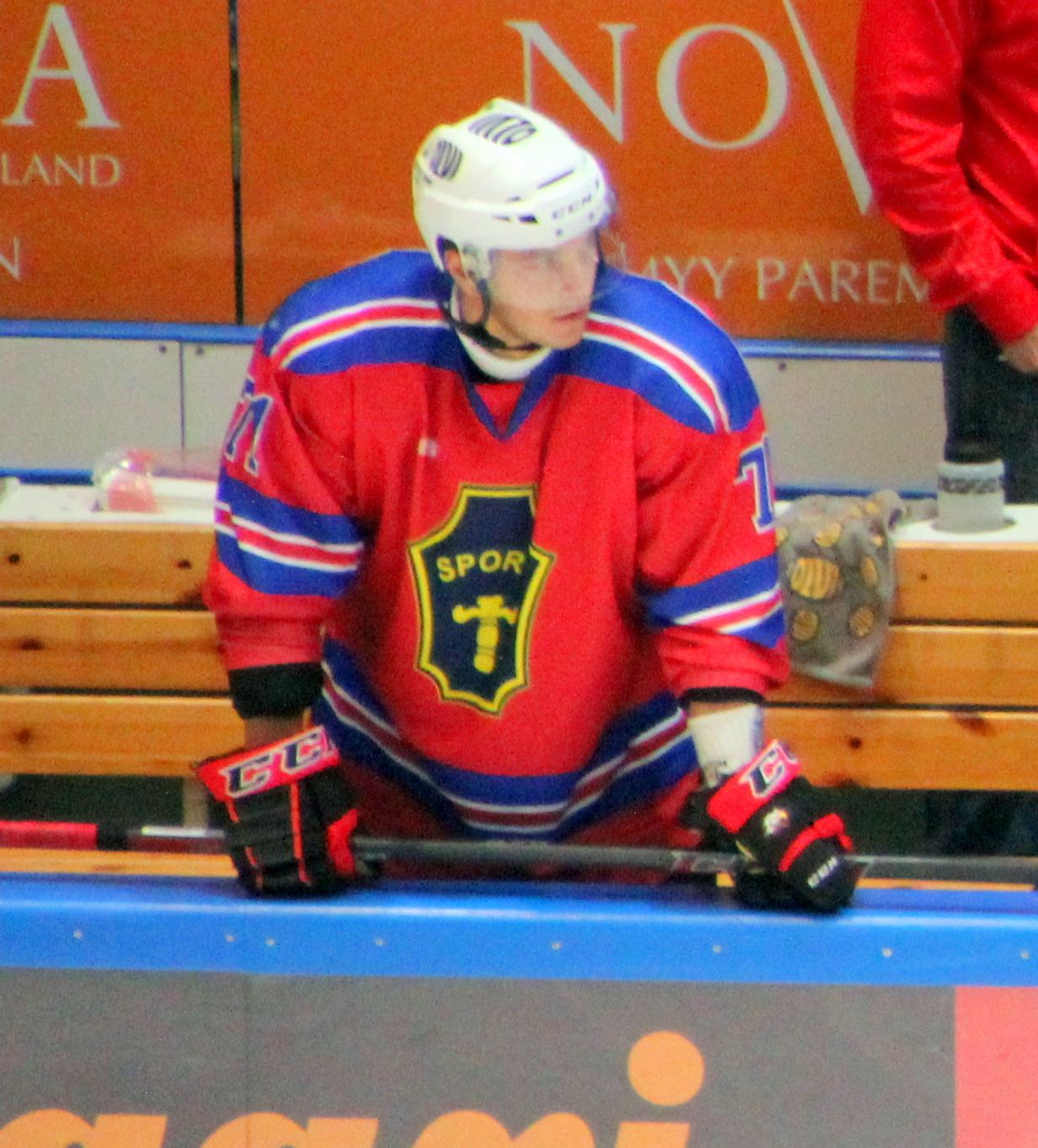
- Born: June 2, 1980 (age 45) Vaasa, FIN
- Height: 6 ft 2 in (188 cm)
- Weight: 201 lb (91 kg; 14 st 5 lb)
- Position: Forward
- Shot: Left
- Played for: Ässät; Ilves; Lukko; Oulun Kärpät; Kloten Flyers; HPK; Vaasan Sport
- Playing career: 2000–2018

Marko Luomala (born June 2, 1980) is a Finnish former professional ice hockey player. He played in Liiga for Ässät, Ilves, Lukko, Oulun Kärpät, Kloten Flyers, HPK and Vaasan Sport.

== Career statistics ==
			Regular season					Playoffs
Season	Team	League	GP	G	A	Pts	PIM	GP	G	A	Pts	PIM
1995–96	Vaasan Sport U16	Jr. C SM-sarja	4	2	0	2	2	—	—	—	—	—
1998–99	JYP Jyväskylä U20	Jr. A SM-liiga	29	7	4	11	10	—	—	—	—	—
1999–00	Ässät U20	Jr. A SM-liiga	20	13	5	18	6	—	—	—	—	—
1999–00	Ässät	Liiga	10	1	0	1	2	—	—	—	—	—
2000–01	Vaasan Sport U20	Jr. A I-Divisioona	4	9	6	15	14	—	—	—	—	—
2000–01	Vaasan Sport	Mestis	31	5	4	9	20	—	—	—	—	—
2001–02	Vaasan Sport	Mestis	42	15	12	27	12	9	4	3	7	2
2002–03	Ilves	Liiga	55	7	4	11	14	—	—	—	—	—
2003–04	Ilves	Liiga	50	9	8	17	37	7	2	0	2	4
2004–05	Ilves	Liiga	47	4	8	12	18	7	0	0	0	4
2005–06	Ilves	Liiga	52	9	3	12	20	3	0	0	0	0
2006–07	Lukko	Liiga	48	9	13	22	26	—	—	—	—	—
2007–08	Lukko	Liiga	42	8	3	11	20	3	0	0	0	0
2008–09	Ässät	Liiga	56	14	13	27	26	—	—	—	—	—
2009–10	Ässät	Liiga	55	27	17	44	24	—	—	—	—	—
2010–11	Kärpät	Liiga	30	4	9	13	12	—	—	—	—	—
2010–11	Kloten Flyers	NLA	10	3	1	4	2	14	3	1	4	0
2011–12	HPK	Liiga	57	14	7	21	24	—	—	—	—	—
2012–13	HPK	Liiga	41	3	4	7	16	5	1	2	3	4
2013–14	Vaasan Sport	Mestis	48	12	12	24	38	5	2	0	2	0
2014–15	Vaasan Sport	Liiga	10	1	1	2	8	—	—	—	—	—
2014–15	HC Gherdëina	Italy	8	3	10	13	4	4	1	0	1	2
2015–16	Milton Keynes Lightning	EPIHL	24	12	6	18	2	—	—	—	—	—
2015–16	Ferencvárosi TC	Erste Liga	20	12	11	23	50	2	1	0	1	—
2016–17	KoMu HT	2. Divisioona	13	7	19	26	6	1	0	1	1	25
2016–17	Olofströms IK	Division 2	14	5	17	22	26	—	—	—	—	—
Liiga totals			553	110	90	200	247	38	6	5	11	16
Mestis totals			121	32	28	60	70	14	6	3	9	2
