= Danny Bois =

Canadian ice hockey player (born 1983)

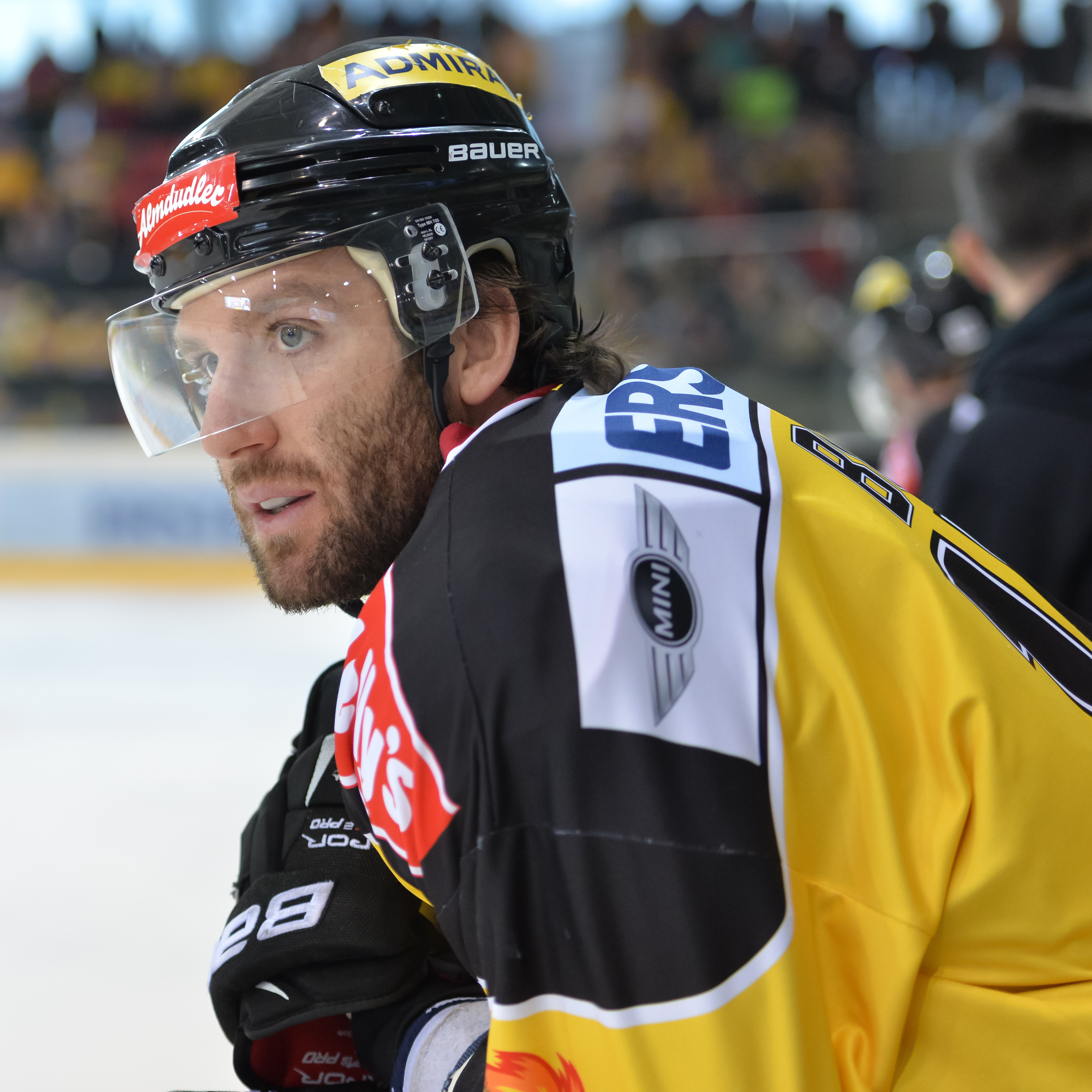
- Bois with the Vienna Capitals in 2016
- Born: June 1, 1983 (age 42) Thunder Bay, Ontario, Canada
- Height: 6 ft 1 in (185 cm)
- Weight: 197 lb (89 kg; 14 st 1 lb)
- Position: Right wing
- Shot: Right
- Played for: Ottawa Senators; EC Red Bull Salzburg; Dornbirner EC; EHC München; Sheffield Steelers; Vienna Capitals
- NHL draft: 97th overall, 2001; Colorado Avalanche
- Playing career: 2004–2016

Daniel Bois (born June 1, 1983) is a Canadian former professional ice hockey winger. Bois played one game in the National Hockey League (NHL) with the Ottawa Senators. Bois finished his professional career with several seasons in Europe.

== Playing career ==
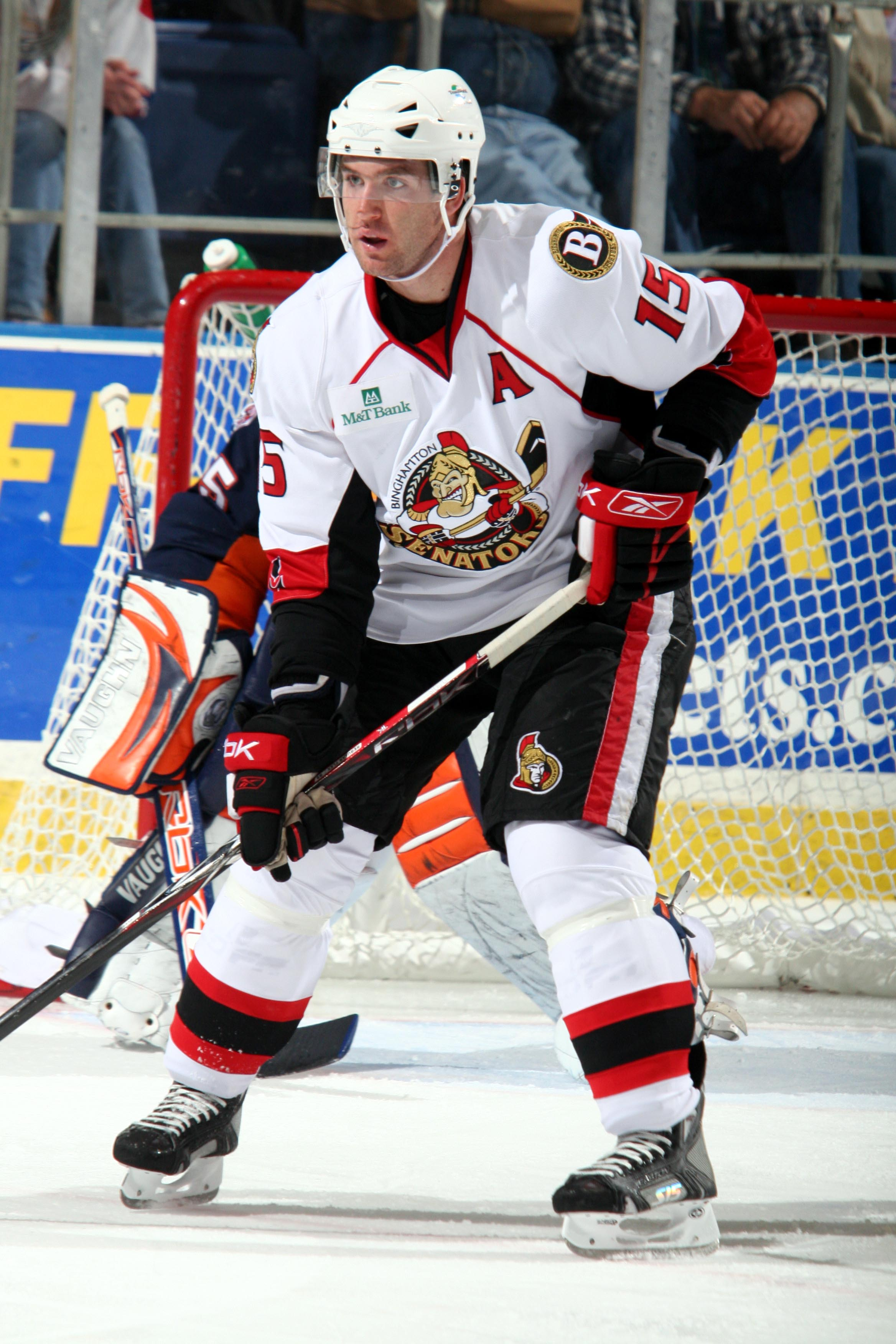
Bois with the Binghamton Senators in 2007

Bois was drafted in the 3rd round, 97th overall in the 2001 NHL entry draft by the Colorado Avalanche. He played junior hockey for the London Knights of the OHL. He served as the team's Captain for several years.

Unsigned from the Avalanche, Bois signed with the Ottawa Senators on April 30, 2004. Bois played with an affiliate, the Binghamton Senators, for five seasons playing in just one game with Ottawa in the 2006–07 season.

On July 20, 2009, Bois signed with the Chicago Blackhawks to a one-year contract. He was then assigned to AHL affiliate, the Rockford IceHogs for the duration of the 2009–10 season.

On July 23, 2010, Bois left North America and signed a one-year contract as a free agent with Austrian team EC Red Bull Salzburg of the EBEL. Upon extended his stay for a further season, Bois remained in the Austrian League for his third consecutive season after signing with Dornbirner EC on July 30, 2012.

After his third completed season in Austria, Bois opted to move to Germany and signed a one-year contract with EHC München of the Deutsche Eishockey Liga on May 10, 2013.

Bois enjoyed a brief stint in the Elite Ice Hockey League with the Sheffield Steelers before returning to the Austrian League, with the Vienna Capitals on January 27, 2015. He was later signed to a one-year extension to remain with the Capitals on May 15, 2015.

== Career statistics ==
			Regular season					Playoffs
Season	Team	League	GP	G	A	Pts	PIM	GP	G	A	Pts	PIM
1999–2000	Wellington Dukes	OPJHL	37	15	20	35	115	—	—	—	—	—
2000–01	London Knights	OHL	66	21	16	37	218	5	2	1	3	19
2001–02	London Knights	OHL	62	16	14	30	256	12	2	2	4	47
2002–03	London Knights	OHL	56	19	13	32	197	13	4	6	10	38
2003–04	London Knights	OHL	52	14	25	39	242	7	4	4	8	29
2004–05	Binghamton Senators	AHL	72	2	4	6	287	6	0	1	1	2
2005–06	Binghamton Senators	AHL	79	18	17	35	226	—	—	—	—	—
2006–07	Binghamton Senators	AHL	65	14	13	27	153	—	—	—	—	—
2006–07	Ottawa Senators	NHL	1	0	0	0	7	—	—	—	—	—
2007–08	Binghamton Senators	AHL	54	8	13	21	153	—	—	—	—	—
2008–09	Binghamton Senators	AHL	66	12	12	24	149	—	—	—	—	—
2009–10	Rockford IceHogs	AHL	73	10	12	22	156	4	0	0	0	20
2010–11	EC Red Bull Salzburg	AUT	48	12	17	29	136	17	1	3	4	76
2011–12	EC Red Bull Salzburg	AUT	43	11	13	24	154	1	0	0	0	2
2012–13	Dornbirner EC	AUT	47	12	11	23	135	—	—	—	—	—
2013–14	EHC Red Bull München	DEL	46	5	10	15	133	3	0	1	1	0
2014–15	Sheffield Steelers	EIHL	13	2	3	5	18	—	—	—	—	—
2014–15	Vienna Capitals	AUT	11	3	0	3	16	15	1	3	4	44
2015–16	Vienna Capitals	AUT	48	5	10	15	118	5	0	1	1	20
AHL totals			409	64	71	135	1124	10	0	1	1	22
NHL totals			1	0	0	0	7	—	—	—	—	—
AUT totals			197	43	51	94	559	38	2	7	9	142
