= Mario Valery-Trabucco =

Canadian ice hockey player

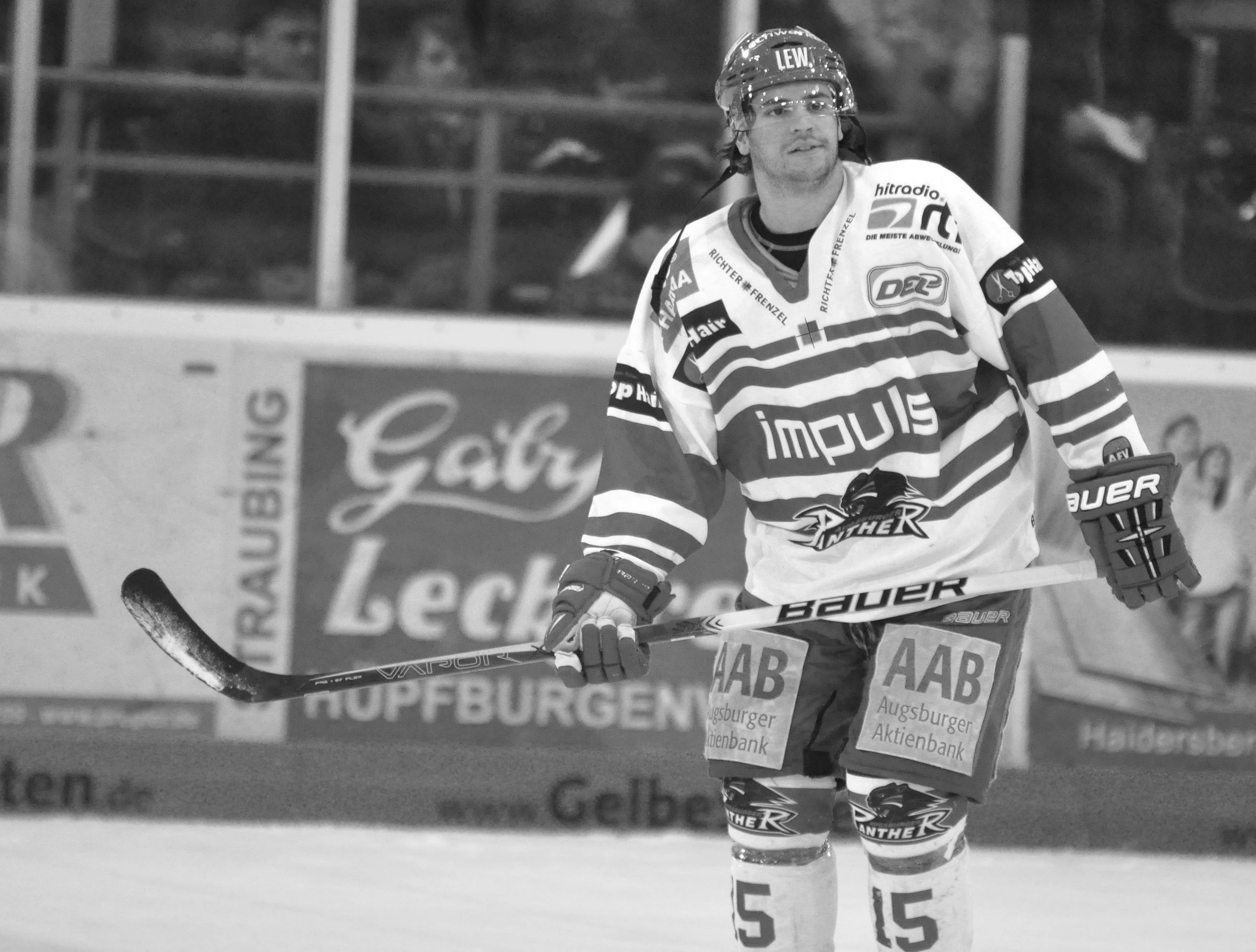
- Born: February 19, 1987 (age 39) Caracas, Venezuela
- Height: 5 ft 11 in (180 cm)
- Weight: 195 lb (88 kg; 13 st 13 lb)
- Position: Right wing
- Shoots: Right
- Oberliga team Former teams: Hannover Scorpions; Adirondack Phantoms; TPS; Augsburger Panther; Manchester Storm; Gothiques d'Amiens
- NHL draft: Undrafted
- Playing career: 2010–present

Mario Valery-Trabucco (born February 19, 1987) is a Canadian professional ice hockey forward. He currently plays for the Hannover Scorpions in the German Oberliga.

Trabucco graduated from Union College in 2010, and went on to play in two games with the Adirondack Phantoms of the American Hockey League during the 2009–10 AHL season. In the following 2010–11 season, Trabucco played in Finland for TPS of the SM-liiga.

On July 6, 2011, Valery-Trabucco then moved to the German DEL, signing a one-year contract with Augsburger Panther.

He joined Manchester Storm of the EIHL for the 2016/2017 season. In June 2017, he moved to Gothiques d'Amiens in the Ligue Magnus.

In 2019, Trabucco signed for German Oberliga side Hannover Scorpions.

== Awards and honours ==
Award	Year	Ref
All-ECAC Hockey Second team	2009–10	
