= Petri Koivisto =

Finnish ice hockey player (1986–2024)

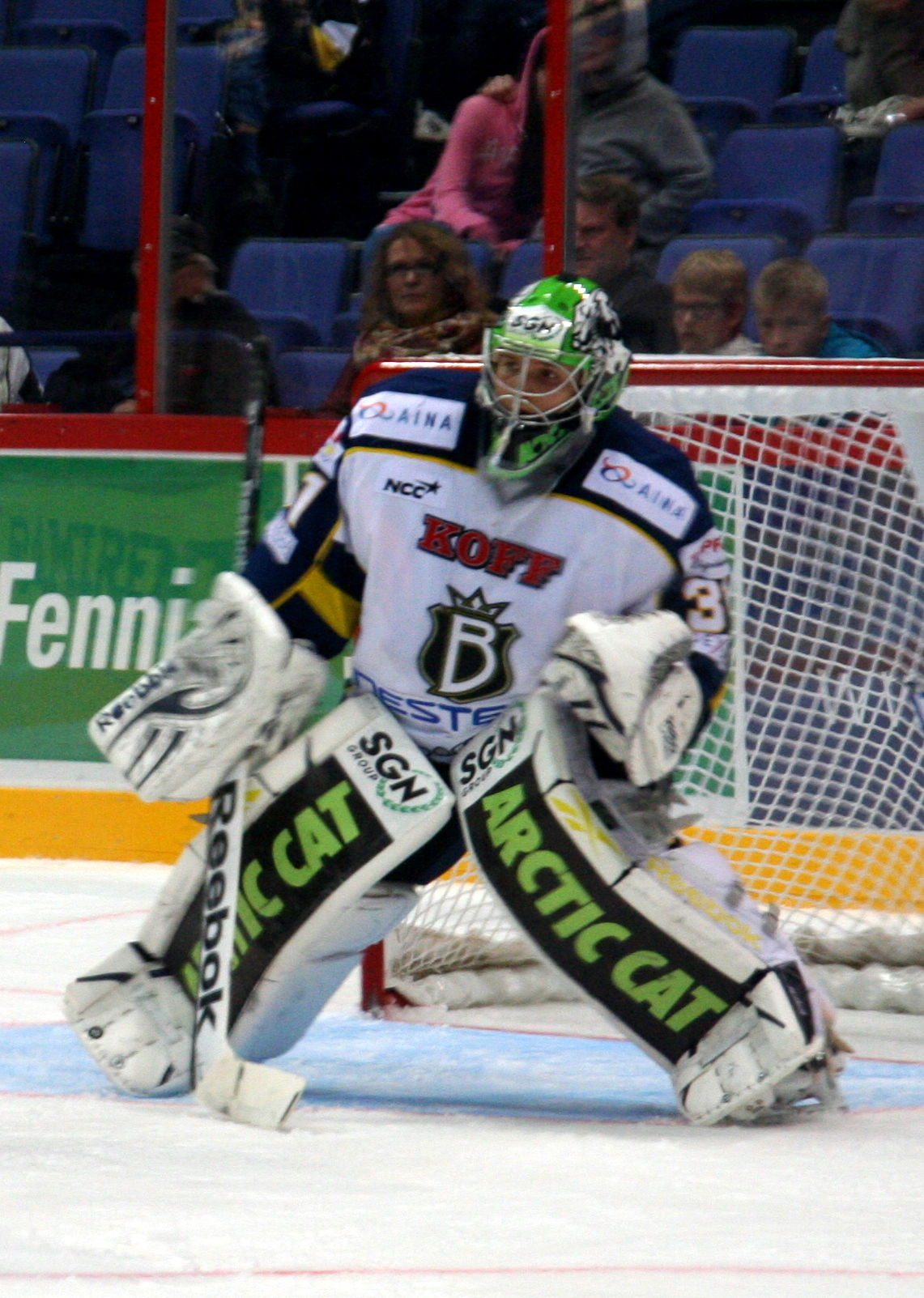
- Born: 15 November 1986; Kiiminki, Finland
- Died: 26 January 2024 (aged 37)
- Height: 5 ft 10 in (178 cm)
- Weight: 179 lb (81 kg; 12 st 11 lb)
- Position: Goaltender
- Shot: Left
- SM-liiga team: Espoo Blues
- NHL draft: Undrafted
- Playing career: 2006–2011

Petri Koivisto (15 November 1986 – 26 January 2024) was a Finnish ice hockey goaltender who played professionally in Finland for Espoo Blues of the SM-liiga.

Koivisto died on 26 January 2024, at the age of 37.
