= Vladimír Sičák =

Czech ice hockey player

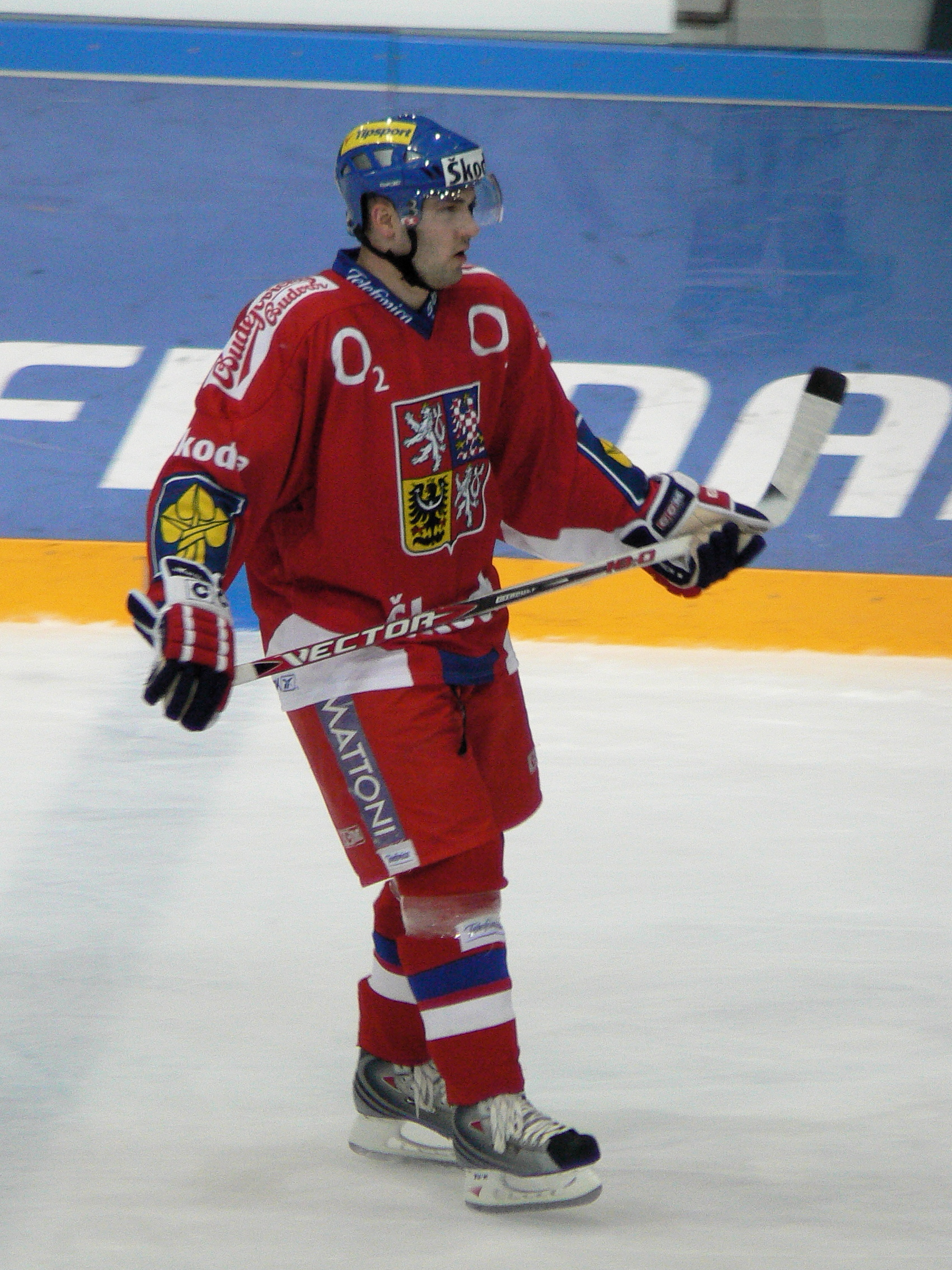
- Born: December 1, 1980 (age 45) Jindřichův Hradec, Czechoslovakia (now Czech Republic)
- Height: 5 ft 10 in (178 cm)
- Weight: 185 lb (84 kg; 13 st 3 lb)
- Position: Defence
- Shoots: Left
- SM-liiga team: Oulun Kärpät
- Playing career: 1997–present

Vladimír Sičák is a Czech ice hockey defenceman who currently plays professionally in Finland for Oulun Kärpät of the SM-liiga.

== Career statistics ==
			Regular season					Playoffs
Season	Team	League	GP	G	A	Pts	PIM	GP	G	A	Pts	PIM
1996–97	HC České Budějovice U18	Czech U18	26	1	2	3	—	—	—	—	—	—
1996–97	HC České Budějovice U20	Czech U20	15	0	1	1	—	—	—	—	—	—
1997–98	HC České Budějovice U20	Czech U20	26	2	3	5	—	—	—	—	—	—
1997–98	HC České Budějovice	Czech	14	0	1	1	0	—	—	—	—	—
1998–99	HC České Budějovice	Czech	25	1	1	2	12	—	—	—	—	—
1998–99	Medicine Hat Tigers	WHL	35	1	9	10	71	—	—	—	—	—
1999–00	Medicine Hat Tigers	WHL	72	7	27	34	73	—	—	—	—	—
2000–01	Greenville Grrrowl	ECHL	34	4	6	10	16	—	—	—	—	—
2000–01	Orlando Solar Bears	IHL	33	1	3	4	15	—	—	—	—	—
2001–02	HPK	SM-liiga	55	10	8	18	20	8	1	2	3	4
2002–03	HPK	SM-liiga	56	9	10	19	20	13	1	1	2	2
2003–04	HPK	SM-liiga	54	13	5	18	55	8	2	0	2	6
2004–05	HPK	SM-liiga	54	8	13	21	46	10	0	2	2	27
2005–06	Modo Hockey	Elitserien	35	0	1	1	12	—	—	—	—	—
2005–06	HC TPS	SM-liiga	20	4	4	8	16	2	0	1	1	4
2006–07	HC TPS	SM-liiga	44	5	11	16	46	—	—	—	—	—
2006–07	Malmö Redhawks	Elitserien	10	1	2	3	2	—	—	—	—	—
2007–08	HC Mountfield	Czech	50	0	8	8	20	12	0	1	1	12
2008–09	HC Mountfield	Czech	48	1	8	9	28	—	—	—	—	—
2009–10	HC Vítkovice	Czech	50	9	17	26	56	9	1	3	4	4
2010–11	Oulun Kärpät	SM-liiga	49	5	12	17	76	3	0	0	0	0
2011–12	HC Pardubice	Czech	41	3	14	17	22	19	1	6	7	16
2012–13	HC Pardubice	Czech	8	0	1	1	2	—	—	—	—	—
2012–13	HC Sparta Praha	Czech	42	7	16	23	30	7	0	1	1	4
2013–14	HC Sparta Praha	Czech	40	3	8	11	20	10	0	1	1	4
2014–15	HC Energie Karlovy Vary	Czech	50	3	12	15	26	—	—	—	—	—
2015–16	HC Energie Karlovy Vary	Czech	48	1	5	6	28	—	—	—	—	—
2016–17	HC Energie Karlovy Vary	Czech	48	4	10	14	34	—	—	—	—	—
2017–18	HC Energie Karlovy Vary	Czech2	49	4	18	22	28	3	0	1	1	6
2018–19	HC Energie Karlovy Vary	Czech	43	3	5	8	56	—	—	—	—	—
2019–20	David Servis Ceske Budejovice	Czech3	35	9	16	25	18	3	0	1	1	2
2020–21	HC Samson České Budějovice	Czech4	3	0	0	0	6	—	—	—	—	—
2021–22	HC Samson České Budějovice	Czech4	18	6	20	26	12	5	1	5	6	2
2022–23	HC Samson České Budějovice	Czech4	14	6	18	24	6	9	1	11	12	2
Czech totals			507	35	106	141	334	57	2	12	14	40
SM-liiga totals			332	54	63	117	279	44	4	6	10	43
