= Michel Gigon =

French painter (1929–2022)

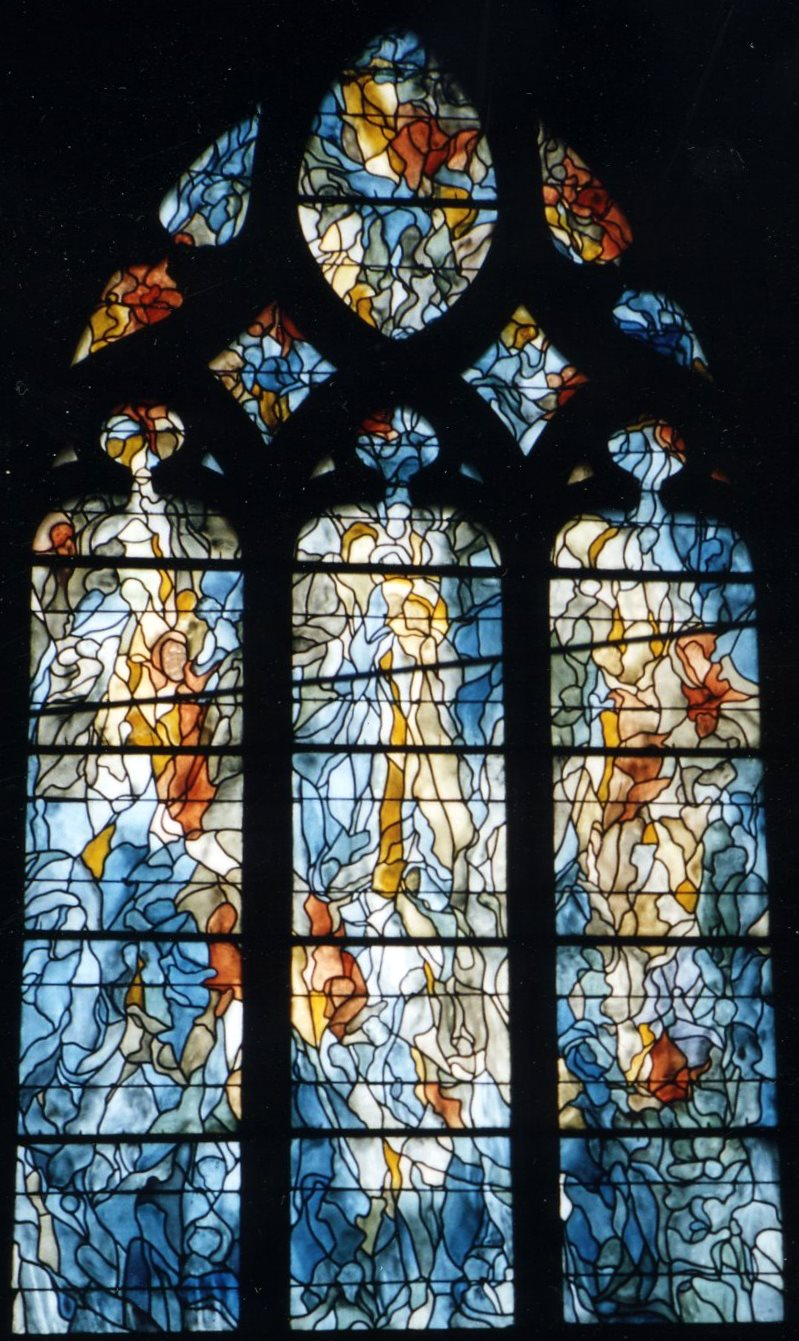
stained-glass windows of Saint-Crépin church (Château-Thierry), create by Michel Gigon

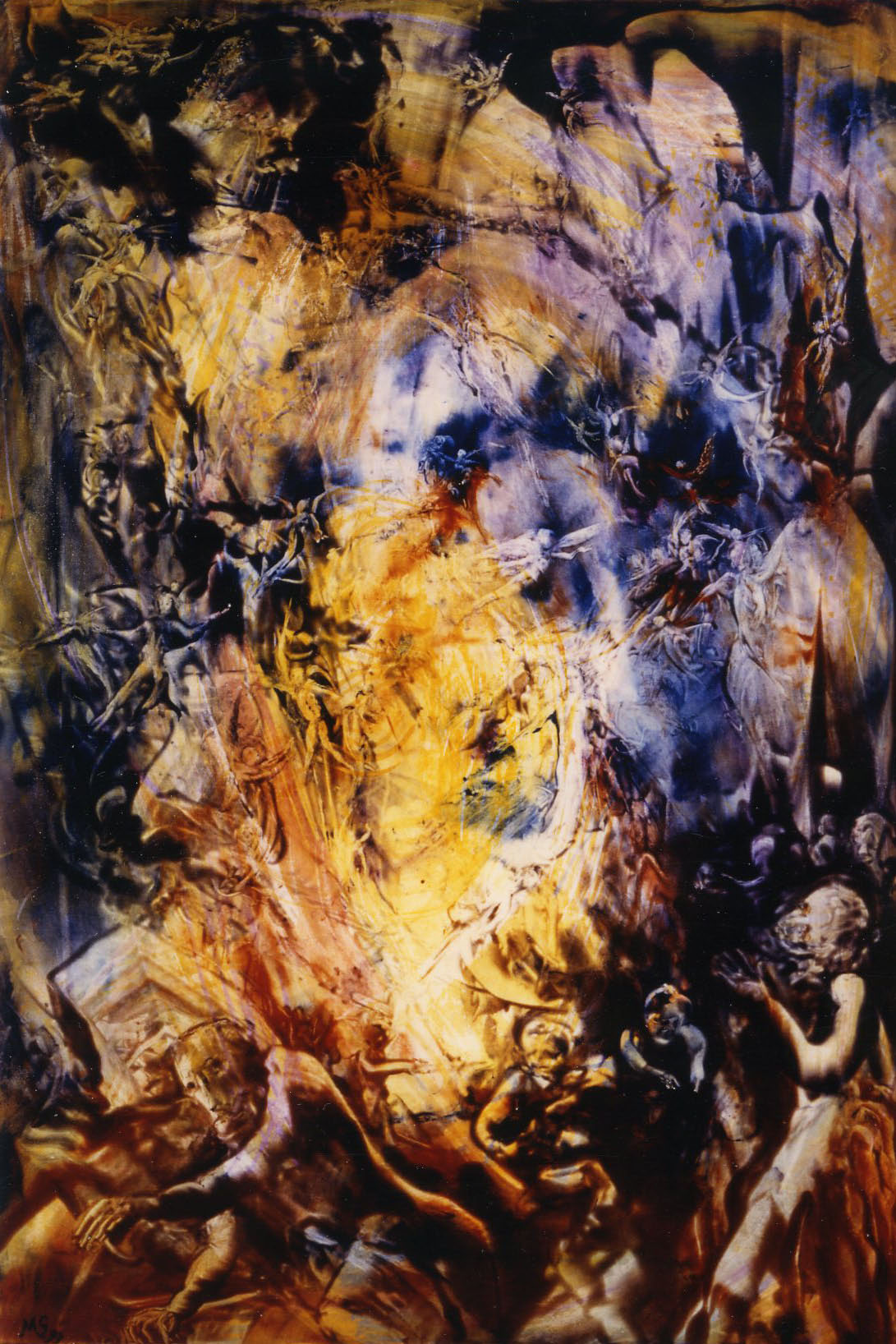
Painting from private collection, Title: Ah si tu déchirais les cieux, Dimensions: 116x73, Created by Michel Gigon

Michel Paul Marie Gigon (11 September 1929 – 25 May 2022) was a French painter and stained-glass window designer.

== Biography ==
Michel Paul Marie Gigon was born in Caen, Calvados on 11 September 1929. He began his artistic career in 1953. Gigon died in Le Coudray on 25 May 2022, at the age of 92.

== Work ==
Gigon had many exhibitions in France, Germany, Switzerland, Japan and Poland. Many of its paintings are in private collections in France, Switzerland, Germany, Spain.

- Caen museum one painting.
- Rennes museum several drawings.
- Arts et Lettres management of Paris one drawing.
- Kłodzko museum (Poland) one painting.
- CES Marcel Proust school at Illiers-Combray (Eure-et-Loir) one painting.
- Saint Germain l’Auxerois church Paris, one painting.

=== Michel Gigon's stained-glass windows in France ===
==== North of France ====
- Pas-de-Calais Courset, Chapelle du foyer de charité
- Pas-de-Calais Saint-Omer, Chapelle de la Malassise « Ecole »
- Pas-de-Calais Wisques, Abbaye des Moniales « Eglise »
- Nord Aulnoye, Eglise Saint-Eloi
- Nord Haumont, Eglise Saint-Michel
- Nord Mont-des-Cats, Eglise paroissiale

==== Paris area ====
- Yvelines Andrésy, Parish church
- Yvelines Bois d’Arcy, Parish church
- Aisne Château-Thierry, Saint-Crépin church
- Val d'Oise Hodent near Magny-en-Vexin, stained-glass windows for an old monastic farm

==== In Normandy ====
- Seine-Maritime Le Havre, CES Viviani, dalle de verre
- Calvados Goustranville, Parish church
- Manche Bricquebec, Abbaye Notre Dame de Grâce
- Manche Canville la Roque, Eglise Saint Malo (to see painting « Transfiguration »)
- Manche Cosqueville, Parish church
- Manche Tamerville, Parish church

==== South of France ====
- Lot Bovila, Parish church
- Lot Rouillac, Parish church related to Montcuq
- Lot Saint Geniez, Parish church related to Montcuq
- Bouches-du-Rhône Aix-en-Provence, Chapelle du séminaire
- Alpes-Maritimes Saint Honorat island, Lérins Abbey

==== See also ====
- Ardennes Dom-le-Mesnil, Parish church
- Charente-Maritime Saint-Sauvant, Parish church
- Eure-et-Loir Dreux, school of la Sablonnière, stained-glass window and mosaic
- Morbihan Arzal, church of Lantierne

== Bibliography ==
- Revue Vitrea: Vitrail - Verre - Architecture - Le vitrail français moderne

Revue du centre international du vitrail - n° 4 - 2eme semestre 1989 ISSN 0991-0131 Page 52: Les peintres et le vitrail

=== About Michel Gigon ===
- Monograph "Michel Gigon"

Jil Silberstein, preface from André Frossard (1980).

- Le vitrail français contemporain

Françoise Perrot - Centre international du vitrail - Chartres Edition: L'oeil & la main - La manufacture ISBN 2-904638-17-2 Diffusion LA MANUFACTURE 1984 Page 68

- Le vitrail Contemporain "Comme un chant de lumière"

Jean-Marie Geron - Albert Moxhet Edition: Dexia - La renaissance du livre ISBN 2-8046-0557-4 Collection Références Pages 18, 146, 147

- Revue: Exposition - Un siecle de vitrail en picardie

association Monuments de picardie April 1987

- L'Homme nouveau - Number 1411 - December 22sd 2007

Pages 4, 5 Portrait "Un artiste déconcertant" Geneviève Bayle
