= Olivier Gigon =

Swiss ice hockey player

- Born: March 30, 1979 (age 45); Delémont, Switzerland
- Height: 6 ft 4 in (193 cm)
- Weight: 209 lb (95 kg; 14 st 13 lb)
- Position: Goaltender
- Caught: Left
- Played for: EHC Basel; HC Fribourg-Gottéron; SC Bern
- Playing career: 2001–2014

Olivier Gigon (born January 4, 1979) is a Swiss former professional ice hockey goaltender. He played in Switzerland’s Nationalliga A for EHC Basel, Fribourg-Gottéron and SC Bern.
