= Jens Skålberg =

Swedish ice hockey player (born 1985)

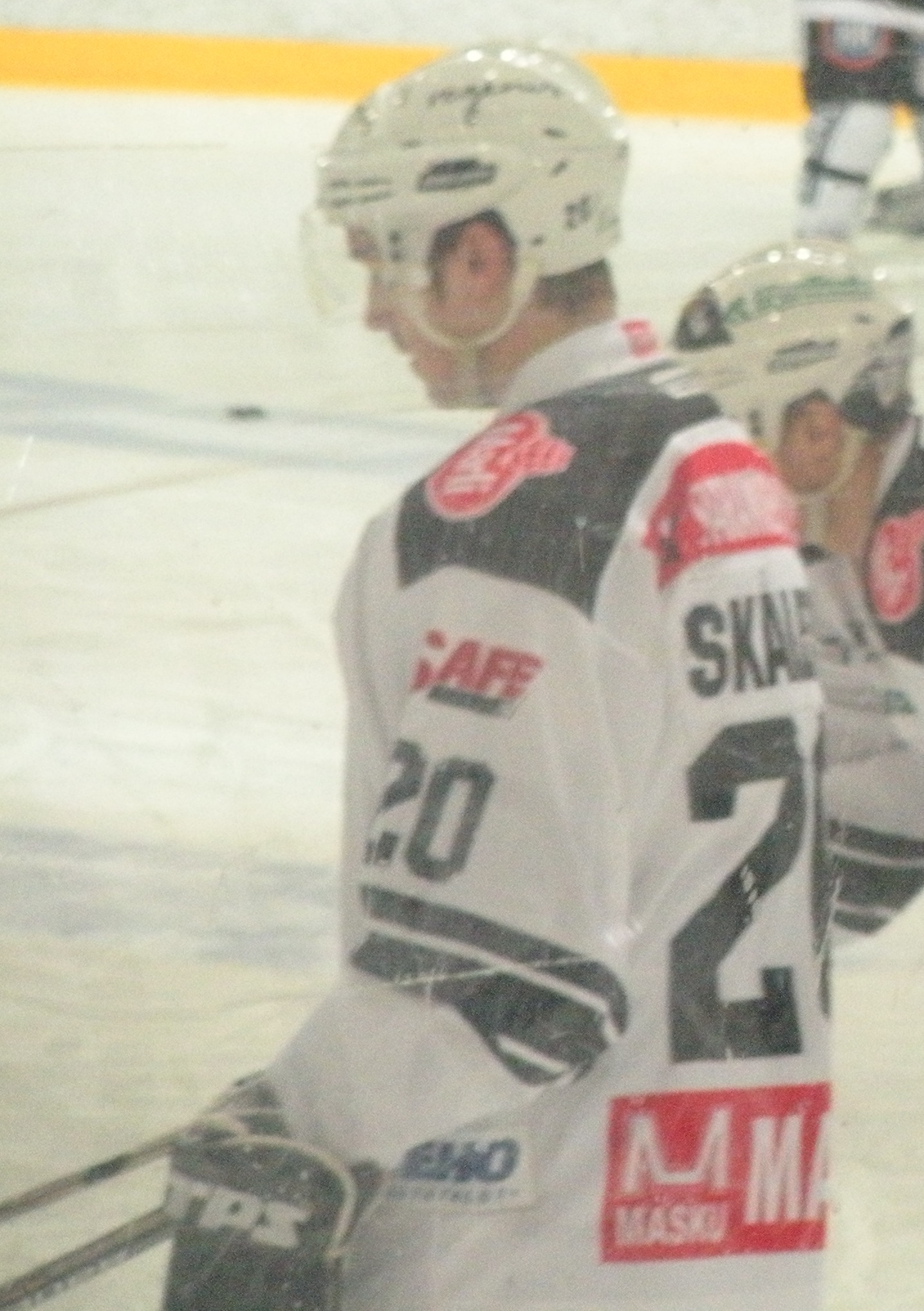
- Swedish ice hockey player Jens Skålberg in jersey of TPS
- Born: July 2, 1985 (age 41) Munkfors, SWE
- Height: 5 ft 11 in (180 cm)
- Weight: 176 lb (80 kg; 12 st 8 lb)
- Position: Defence
- Shot: Left
- Played for: IFK Munkfors; Forshaga IF; Grums IK; Örebro HK; Färjestad BK; Malmö Redhawks; TPS; Lørenskog IK; BIK Karlskoga
- Playing career: 2003–2016

Jens Skålberg (born July 2, 1985, in Munkfors) is a Swedish ice hockey defenceman. He is currently playing for TPS in the Finnish SM-liiga. The 2007/08 season will be his first in the Elitserien. Skålberg's name is spelled without an "h", which is a common mistake people make. He will be playing for TPS in the SM-liiga in 2009/2010.

== Career statistics ==
			Regular season					Playoffs
Season	Team	League	GP	G	A	Pts	PIM	GP	G	A	Pts	PIM
1999–00	IFK Munkfors J20	J20 Div.1	8	1	1	2	0	—	—	—	—	—
2000–01	IFK Munkfors J20	J20 Div.2	—	—	—	—	—	—	—	—	—	—
2001–02	IFK Munkfors	Division 2	—	—	—	—	—	—	—	—	—	—
2002–03	IFK Munkfors	Division 2	—	—	—	—	—	—	—	—	—	—
2003–04	Forshaga IF	Division 1	—	—	—	—	—	—	—	—	—	—
2004–05	Grums IK	Division 1	—	5	—	—	—	—	—	—	—	—
2005–06	Grums IK	Division 1	32	5	11	16	49	—	—	—	—	—
2006–07	Örebro HK	Division 1	41	4	20	24	52	2	0	0	0	0
2007–08	Färjestad BK	Elitserien	53	0	5	5	26	12	0	0	0	0
2008–09	Färjestad BK	Elitserien	39	2	3	5	20	9	0	0	0	0
2008–09	Malmö Redhawks	HockeyAllsvenskan	6	0	1	1	4	—	—	—	—	—
2009–10	HC TPS	SM-liiga	43	3	10	13	26	15	3	2	5	8
2010–11	HC TPS	SM-liiga	37	0	1	1	6	—	—	—	—	—
2011–12	Örebro HK	HockeyAllsvenskan	49	2	8	10	40	10	0	3	3	0
2012–13	Örebro HK	HockeyAllsvenskan	41	0	1	1	14	16	0	1	1	0
2013–14	Lørenskog IK	Norway	45	2	12	14	30	5	1	1	2	34
2014–15	BIK Karlskoga	HockeyAllsvenskan	7	0	0	0	0	—	—	—	—	—
2015–16	BIK Karlskoga	HockeyAllsvenskan	32	1	5	6	8	—	—	—	—	—
Elitserien totals			92	2	8	10	46	21	0	0	0	0
SM-liiga totals			80	3	11	14	32	15	3	2	5	8
Norway totals			45	2	12	14	30	5	1	1	2	34
HockeyAllsvenskan totals			135	3	15	18	66	26	0	4	4	0
