= Andreas Hänni (ice hockey) =

Swiss ice hockey player

Andreas Hanni
- Born: January 4, 1979 (age 47) Erlenbach, Switzerland
- Height: 6 ft 2 in (188 cm)
- Weight: 218 lb (99 kg; 15 st 8 lb)
- Position: Defence
- Shot: Left
- Played for: HC Ambrì-Piotta; HC Lugano; SC Bern; EHC Biel
- Playing career: 1997–2014

Andreas Hanni (born January 4, 1979) is a Swiss former professional ice hockey defenceman. He played in Switzerland's Nationalliga A for HC Ambrì-Piotta, HC Lugano, SC Bern and EHC Biel

He has followed a vegan diet since he was 18 for ethical reasons.
