= Antti Kerälä =

Finnish ice hockey player

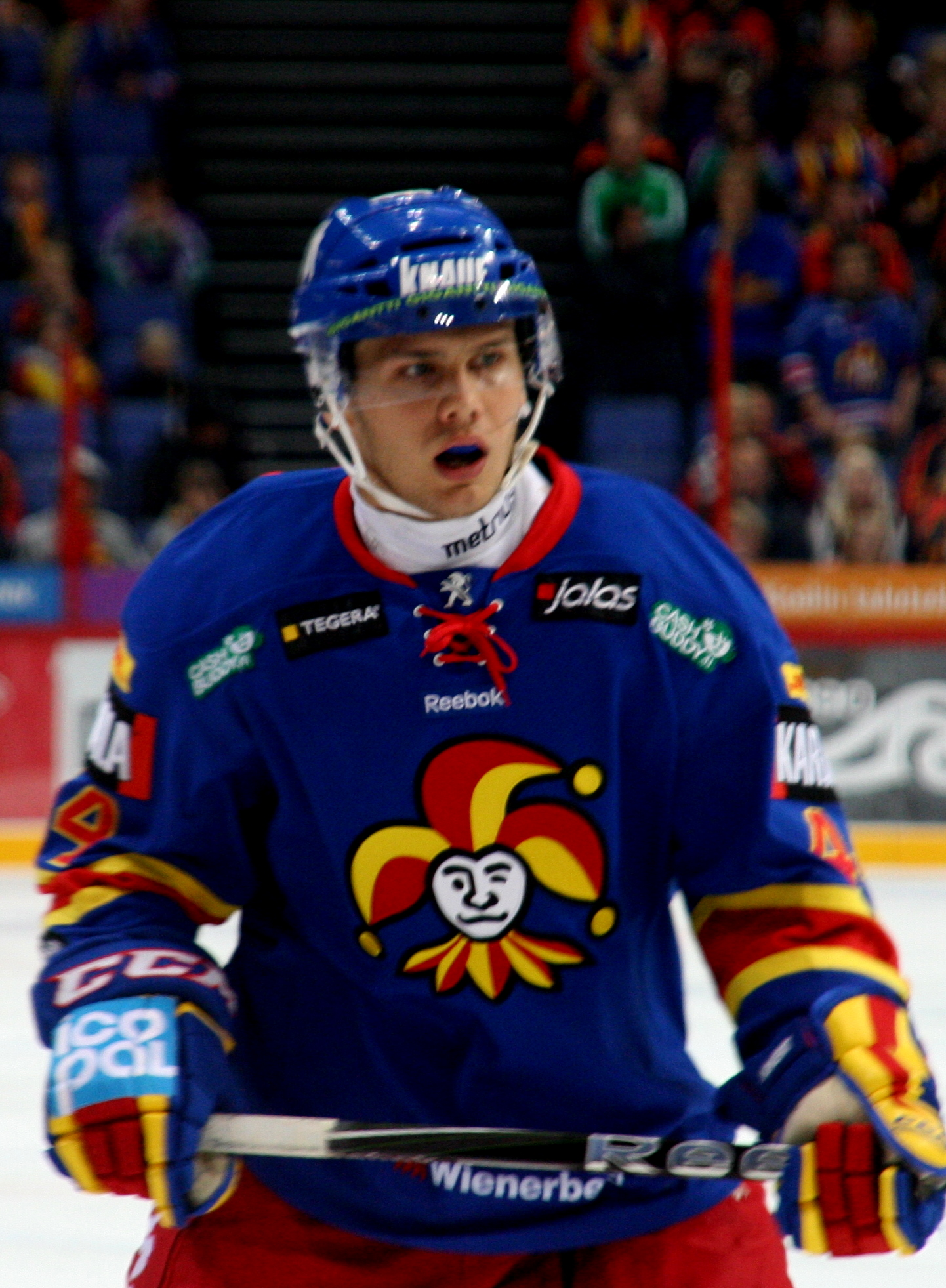
- Born: February 3, 1987 (age 38) Hattula, Finland
- Height: 6 ft 0 in (183 cm)
- Weight: 176 lb (80 kg; 12 st 8 lb)
- Position: Centre
- Shot: Left
- Played for: HPK; Jokerit; KalPa; Ässät; Herning Blue Fox; Löwen Frankfurt; ESV Kaudbeuren
- NHL draft: Undrafted
- Playing career: 2007–2020

Antti Kerälä (born February 3, 1987) is a Finnish retired ice hockey center. He has played with HPK, Jokerit, KalPa and Ässät in the Finnish Elite League

== Career statistics ==
			Regular season					Playoffs
Season	Team	League	GP	G	A	Pts	PIM	GP	G	A	Pts	PIM
2002–03	HPK U16	U16 SM-sarja	12	5	6	11	4	2	0	3	3	2
2003–04	HPK U18	U18 SM-sarja	28	4	18	22	4	2	0	0	0	0
2004–05	HPK U18	U18 SM-sarja	22	9	31	40	6	—	—	—	—	—
2004–05	HPK U20	U20 SM-liiga	11	1	4	5	6	—	—	—	—	—
2005–06	HPK U20	U20 SM-liiga	35	6	9	15	24	3	0	0	0	10
2006–07	HPK U20	U20 SM-liiga	35	9	16	25	32	—	—	—	—	—
2006–07	Suomi U20	Mestis	2	0	1	1	0	—	—	—	—	—
2007–08	HPK U20	U20 SM-liiga	26	16	26	42	10	9	2	4	6	4
2007–08	HPK	SM-liiga	7	1	1	2	0	—	—	—	—	—
2007–08	TUTO Hockey	Mestis	4	2	1	3	2	—	—	—	—	—
2008–09	HPK U20	U20 SM-liiga	1	0	2	2	0	—	—	—	—	—
2008–09	HPK	SM-liiga	8	0	2	2	0	—	—	—	—	—
2008–09	LeKi	Mestis	12	2	3	5	0	—	—	—	—	—
2008–09	Mikkelin Jukurit	Mestis	12	6	5	11	0	—	—	—	—	—
2008–09	TUTO Hockey	Mestis	4	1	4	5	0	—	—	—	—	—
2009–10	Jokipojat	Mestis	45	10	38	48	10	9	6	7	13	2
2010–11	Jokerit	SM-liiga	60	17	24	41	12	7	0	2	2	2
2011–12	Jokerit	SM-liiga	55	8	12	20	8	9	0	0	0	2
2012–13	KalPa	SM-liiga	57	10	14	24	10	3	2	2	4	0
2013–14	KalPa	Liiga	12	0	1	1	6	—	—	—	—	—
2013–14	HPK	Liiga	33	3	3	6	0	6	0	0	0	0
2014–15	Porin Ässät	Liiga	52	4	12	16	4	2	0	0	0	0
2014–15	TUTO Hockey	Mestis	2	1	3	4	0	—	—	—	—	—
2015–16	Porin Ässät	Liiga	51	7	23	30	8	—	—	—	—	—
2016–17	Porin Ässät	Liiga	51	4	15	19	0	2	0	0	0	0
2017–18	Herning Blue Fox	Denmark	35	13	22	35	6	—	—	—	—	—
2018–19	Löwen Frankfurt	DEL2	27	8	10	18	2	1	0	0	0	0
2019–20	ESV Kaufbeuren	DEL2	50	15	36	51	24	2	0	1	1	2
Liiga totals			386	54	107	161	48	29	2	4	6	4
