= Jere Ölander =

Finnish ice hockey player

- Born: 2 October 1989 (age 37) Helsinki, Finland
- Height: 6 ft 3.5 in (192 cm)
- Weight: 195 lb (88 kg; 13 st 13 lb)
- Position: Defence
- Shoots: Left
- II-divisioona team Former teams: Viikingit; Jokerit
- Playing career: 2008–present

Jere Ölander (born 2 October 1989 in Helsinki, Finland) is a professional ice hockey defenceman currently playing for Viikingit in the Finnish II-divisioona. He previously played fourteen games for Jokerit in SM-liiga.
