= Jani-Petteri Helenius =

Finnish ice hockey player

- Born: January 18, 1990 (age 35); Helsinki, Finland
- Height: 6 ft 0 in (183 cm)
- Weight: 183 lb (83 kg; 13 st 1 lb)
- Position: Forward
- Shoots: Left
- SM-liiga team: Jokerit

Jani-Petteri Helenius (born January 18, 1990) is a Finnish professional ice hockey player who currently plays for Jokerit of the SM-liiga.
