= Juha Jyrkkiö =

Finnish ice hockey player

- Born: January 17, 1959 (age 66) Forssa, Finland
- Height: 5 ft 11 in (180 cm)
- Weight: 185 lb (84 kg; 13 st 3 lb)
- Position: Left wing
- Shot: Left
- Played for: FoPS; Jokerit; Ässät; HPK
- National team: Finland
- Playing career: 1974–1992

Juha Jyrkkiö (born January 17, 1959) is a Finnish retired professional ice hockey player who played in the SM-liiga. Born in Forssa, he played for FoPS, Jokerit, Ässät and HPK during his 18-year career. At the age of 16, he became the youngest scorer in league history, a record he held for 37 years until Aleksander Barkov Jr. broke it in 2011.

Internationally, he represented his nation at two European Junior Championships (1976, 1977) as well as three World Junior Championships (1977, 1978, 1979). He finished as the fourth-leading scorer at the 1977 World Juniors.

After his playing career, he became a coach. He spent one season in charge of the Ässät under-16 team, leading them to a Junior C championship. He then moved up to the under-20 squad in 2006, where he got to coach his son, Jesse Jyrkkiö. He later coached the Finland national under-16 team.

== Career statistics ==
=== Regular season and playoffs ===
			Regular season					Playoffs
Season	Team	League	GP	G	A	Pts	PIM	GP	G	A	Pts	PIM
1974–75	FoPS	I-Divisioona	20	0	5	5	2	—	—	—	—	—
1975–76	FoPS	Liiga	36	7	5	12	42	—	—	—	—	—
1976–77	FoPS	Liiga	34	14	7	21	37	—	—	—	—	—
1977–78	FoPS	I-Divisioona	34	3	14	17	67	—	—	—	—	—
1978–79	Jokerit	Liiga	36	12	8	20	45	—	—	—	—	—
1979–80	Ässät	Liiga	36	9	19	28	37	7	0	1	1	17
1980–81	Ässät	Liiga	36	3	5	8	46	2	0	1	1	0
1981–82	Ässät	Liiga	35	7	6	13	44	9	1	4	5	4
1982–83	Ässät	Liiga	35	11	12	23	58	—	—	—	—	—
1983–84	Ässät	Liiga	35	3	9	12	62	8	2	2	4	14
1984–85	Ässät	Liiga	36	2	11	13	51	8	1	1	2	17
1985–86	Ässät	Liiga	36	8	14	22	36	—	—	—	—	—
1986–87	Ässät	Liiga	43	6	23	29	99	—	—	—	—	—
1987–88	Ässät	Liiga	43	9	16	25	58	—	—	—	—	—
1988–89	HPK	Liiga	38	8	12	20	38	—	—	—	—	—
1989–90	HPK	Liiga	42	2	7	9	28	—	—	—	—	—
1990–91	Ässät	Liiga	42	8	12	20	50	—	—	—	—	—
1991–92	Ässät	Liiga	44	5	9	14	44	8	0	0	0	14
Liiga totals			615	116	175	291	785	44	4	9	13	68

=== International ===
Year	Team	Event	GP	G	A	Pts	PIM
1976	Finland	EJC	4	2	2	4	8
1977	Finland	EJC	6	4	4	8	10
1977	Finland	WJC	7	7	4	11	8
1978	Finland	WJC	6	1	5	6	10
1979	Finland	WJC	6	0	2	2	9
Junior totals			29	14	17	31	45
