= Hietanen =

Hietanen is a Finnish surname. Notable people with the surname include:

- Helena Hietanen (born 1963), Finnish sculptor
- Janne Hietanen (born 1978), Finnish footballer
- Juha Hietanen (born 1955), Finnish ice hockey player
- Juuso Hietanen (born 1985), Finnish ice hockey player
- Konsta Hietanen (born 1984), Finnish footballer
- Matti Hietanen (born 1983), Finnish volleyball player
- Mika Hietanen (born 1968), Finnish cyclist
- Mikko Hietanen (1911–1999), Finnish long-distance runner
- Valtteri Hietanen (born 1992), Finnish ice hockey player
- Yrjö Hietanen (1927–2011), Finnish sprint canoeist

== See also ==
- Urho Hietanen, a fictional character from The Unknown Soldier novel by Väinö Linna
- Hietanen (Kotka), a port in Kotka and an island
