= Jesse Jyrkkiö =

Finnish ice hockey player

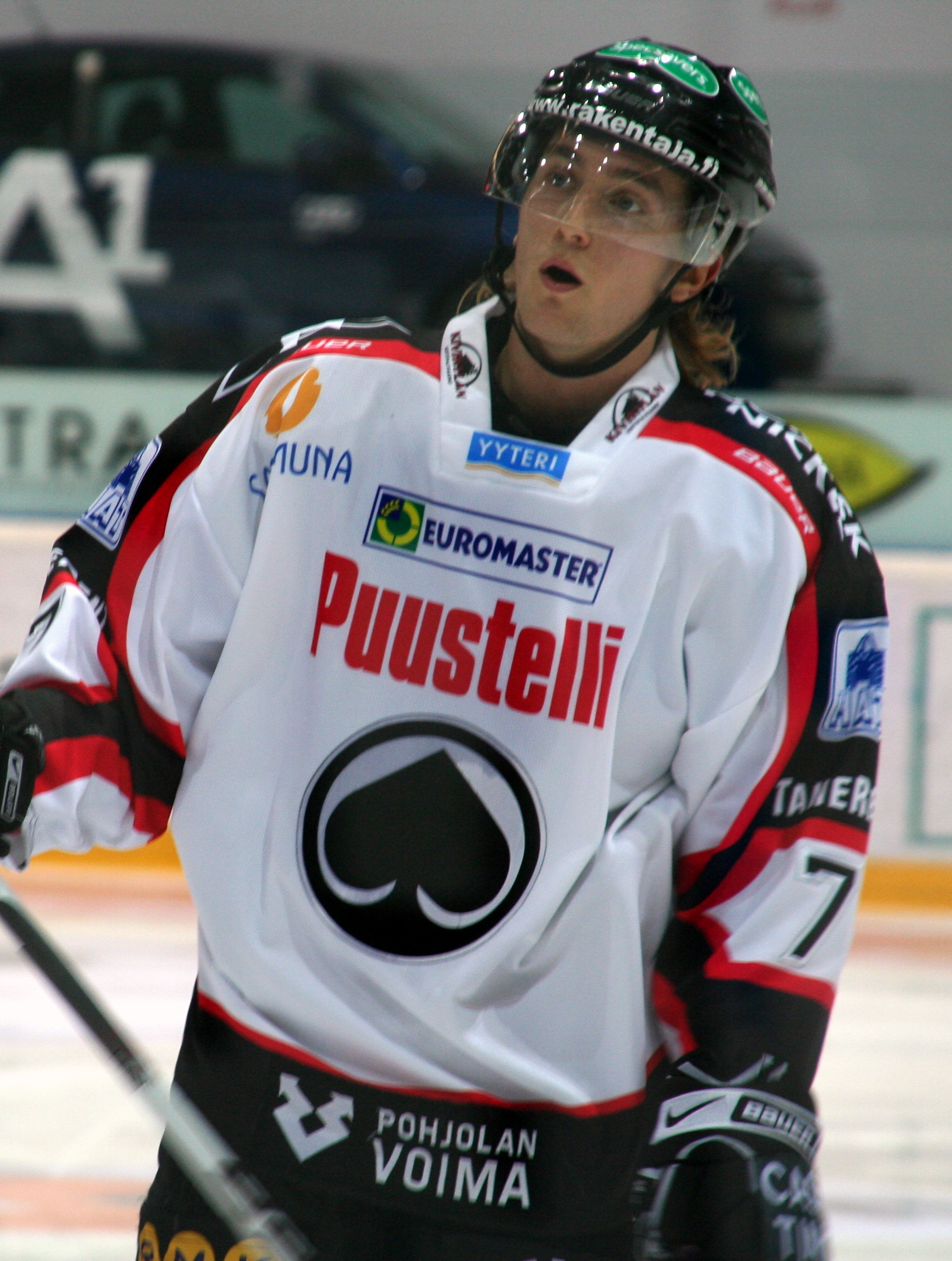
- Born: June 29, 1989 (age 36) Hämeenlinna, Finland
- Height: 5 ft 11 in (180 cm)
- Weight: 183 lb (83 kg; 13 st 1 lb)
- Position: Defence
- Shoots: Right
- team Former teams: Free agent Ässät; Tappara; Graz 99ers Frederikshavn White Hawks; Gentofte Stars; Alba Volán Székesfehérvár; Scorpions de Mulhouse; HDD Jesenice; GKS Katowice
- Playing career: 2007–present

Jesse Jyrkkiö (born June 29, 1989) is a Finnish professional ice hockey defenceman. He is currently a free agent having last played for GKS Katowice in the Polska Hokej Liga. He has previously played in the Finnish Liiga with Ässät and Tappara. Prior to the 2014–15 season, Jyrkkiö signed his first contract abroad in agreeing to a try-out contract with Austrian club, Graz 99ers in the Austrian Hockey League (EBEL) on September 10, 2014.

His father, Juha Jyrkkiö, played for FoPS, Jokerit, Ässät and HPK.
