= Aleksander Barkov =

Finnish ice hockey player (born 1995)

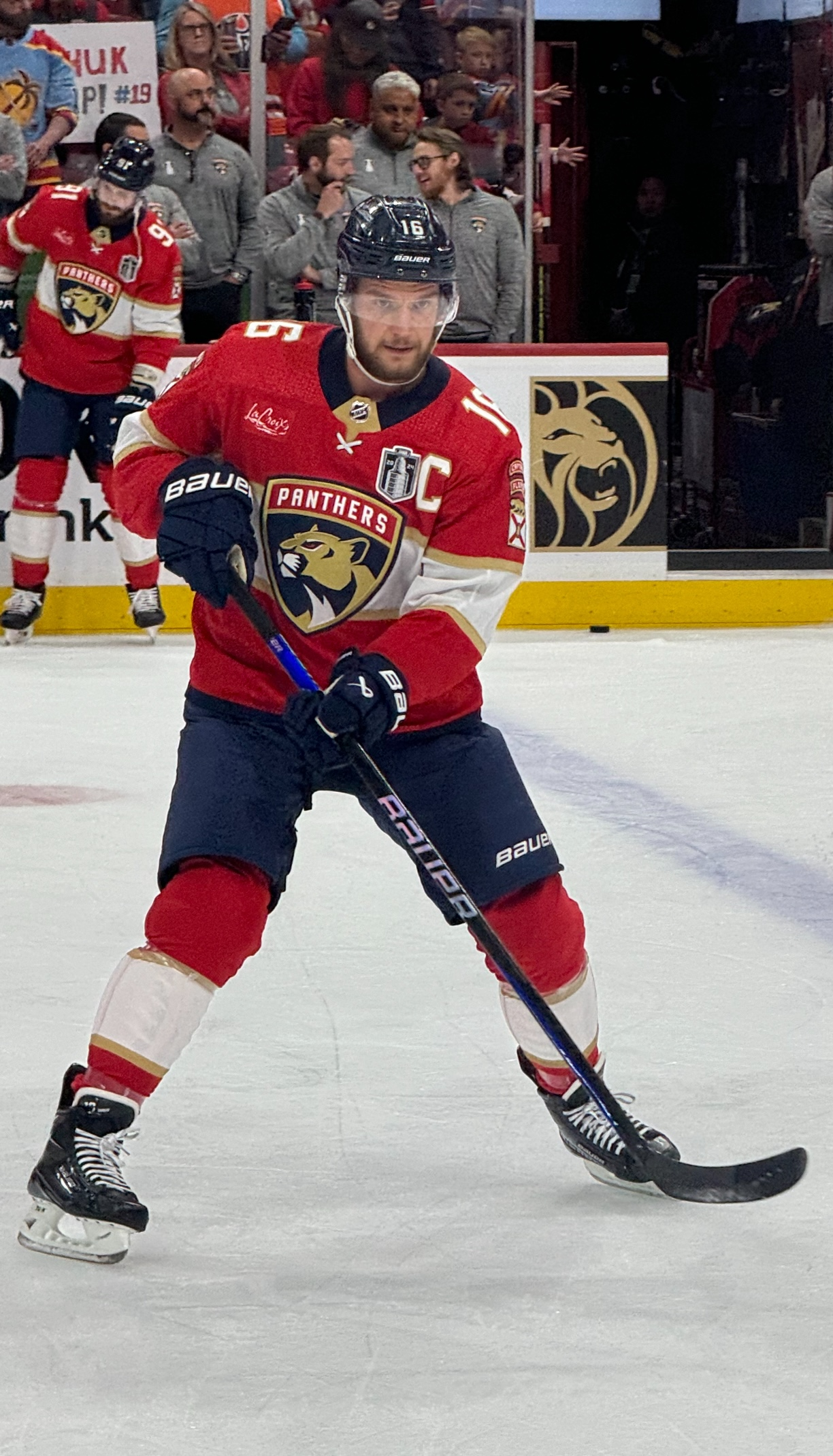
- Barkov with the Florida Panthers during the 2024 Stanley Cup Final
- Born: 2 September 1995 (age 31) Tampere, Finland
- Height: 6 ft 3 in (191 cm)
- Weight: 212 lb (96 kg; 15 st 2 lb)
- Position: Centre
- Shoots: Left
- NHL team Former teams: Florida Panthers; Tappara
- National team: Finland
- NHL draft: 2nd overall, 2013; Florida Panthers
- Playing career: 2011–present

Aleksander Aleksandrovich "Sasha" Barkov (Russian: Александр Александрович Барков, romanized: Aleksandr Aleksandrovich Barkov; born 2 September 1995) is a Finnish professional ice hockey player who is a centre and captain for the Florida Panthers of the National Hockey League (NHL). Barkov was selected by the Panthers in the first round, second overall, of the 2013 NHL entry draft. Barkov is regarded as an elite two-way centre and one of the best defensive forwards in hockey, winning the Frank J. Selke Trophy in 2021, 2024, and 2025.

Barkov is the son of former Russian ice hockey player Alexander Barkov Sr. and holds dual Finnish and Russian citizenship. He was born and raised in Tampere, Finland, where his father played for Tappara of the Finnish SM-Liiga. Barkov joined Tappara's junior system and started his professional career with the club in the SM-Liiga in 2011. Upon making his debut at the age of 16, he surpassed a longstanding record and became the youngest player in the league to score a point. Before suffering a season-ending injury, he set numerous career highs in the 2012–13 season and was ranked first overall amongst international skaters by the NHL Central Scouting Bureau.

Following the draft, Barkov joined the Florida Panthers roster and made his NHL debut as the youngest player in the league during the 2013–14 season. While his early seasons were often shortened due to injuries, he steadily improved his performance over time. Alongside his teammate Jonathan Huberdeau, Barkov often played on the Panthers' first line and his style of play earned widespread recognition across the league. Upon being named the tenth captain in Panthers franchise history in 2018, he experienced a breakout season where he surpassed Pavel Bure's franchise record for most points in a single season. He finished with a franchise-best 96 points and the Lady Byng Memorial Trophy as the league's most gentlemanly player. Despite his efforts, the Panthers only qualified for the playoffs once in his first six seasons with the team.

While the following seasons were shortened due to the COVID-19 pandemic, Barkov and the Panthers thrived and qualified for the Stanley Cup playoffs for four consecutive seasons. After falling in the first round of the 2020 Stanley Cup playoffs, he broke out offensively as he helped lead the Panthers to six consecutive postseasons. During that stretch, Barkov captained the Panthers to back-to-back Stanley Cup championships in 2024 and 2025, becoming the first Finnish-born captain to win the Cup, and the first European to captain multiple Stanley Cup winning teams.

== Early life ==
Barkov was born into a Russian family on 2 September 1995, in Tampere, Finland, to parents Alexander Barkov Sr. and Olga Barkova. His father played ice hockey in Russia, Italy and Finland. While both Aleksander and his father played ice hockey, his older brother Juri was an aspiring professional tennis player before injuries cut his career short. When Barkov Sr. ended his professional career with Tappara, the family decided to reside in Tampere. Growing up, Barkov and his older brother spoke both Finnish and Russian. Barkov is a citizen of both Finland and Russia, and represents Finland in international competition.

== Playing career ==
=== Amateur and Liiga ===
Barkov grew up in Tampere, Finland, and represented his hometown team, Tappara, throughout his junior career. During the 2010–11 season, he became one of the youngest players to compete in the U20 SM-sarja. He finished that season with five goals and 12 assists for 17 points through 25 games. Following this, Barkov made his debut in the top league Liiga with Tappara on 1 October 2011, and became the youngest player in the league to score a point, with his assist on a goal by Kalle Kaijomaa. The 37-year-old record was previously held by Juha Jyrkkiö. As the season progressed, Barkov spent time on the team's power play and averaged 13:32 minutes of ice time. He tallied seven goals and nine assists through 32 games before being ruled out for the remainder of the regular season due to mononucleosis.

Barkov returned to the Liiga for the 2012–13 season where he set numerous career highs. Barkov ranked second on Tappara in scoring with 21 goals and 27 assists for 48 points through 53 games before he suffered a season-ending shoulder injury. The injury required surgery and he was forced to sit out the rest of the playoffs and the fitness portion of the NHL Combine. Despite this, his final ranking from the NHL Central Scouting Bureau for the 2013 NHL entry draft was first overall for international skaters. Barkov was eventually drafted second overall by the Florida Panthers, behind Nathan MacKinnon.

=== Florida Panthers (2013–present) ===
==== 2013–2018: early years in Florida ====
On 15 July 2013, Barkov signed an entry-level contract to begin his professional career with the Florida Panthers. Following the signing, Barkov participated in the Panthers training camp before the start of the 2013–14 season. He made his NHL debut on 3 October 2013, in a win over the Dallas Stars. During the game, he scored his first NHL goal while playing 15:34 and winning three of 13 faceoffs. He subsequently became the youngest player since the 1967 NHL expansion to score a goal in the NHL. As the youngest player in the NHL's 2013–14 season, Barkov continued to produce and quickly accumulated five points in his first seven games. As his points increased, so did his playing time. By the end of October, Barkov went from averaging about 10 minutes to playing more than 13 minutes. As his time increased, Barkov and fellow rookie Nick Bjugstad quickly became steadfast centres on the Panthers first and second lines. Barkov also earned praise from hockey pundits and teammates for playing beyond his years on and off the ice. Throughout December, Barkov recorded nine points through 10 games while playing on the Panthers top line with Sean Bergenheim and Brad Boyes. As a member of the top line through January, Barkov suffered a lower body injury on 21 January and subsequently missed four games. Despite this, he still sat just one point off the team lead in points with 24. In February 2014, Barkov was selected to join the Finland senior team at the 2014 Winter Olympics, becoming the youngest player ever selected for the team. At the time of the selection, he had accumulated eight goals and 16 assists for 24 points, on pace for a 36-point campaign. However, a season-ending injury during the tournament effectively cut his season short.

During the 2014 off-season, the Panthers signed Finnish free agent Jussi Jokinen, who wanted to play on the team because of Barkov. The two had played together in the Olympics and had developed chemistry together. He was reunited on the Panthers top line with Sean Bergenheim and Brad Boyes and the trio combined for five goals and three assists over four games to start the season. However, once Jaromír Jágr joined the team in late February, the veteran joined Barkov on the top line alongside Jonathan Huberdeau. Both Barkov and Huberdeau saw increased point production while playing with Jágr. Over a 12-game period in late February and March, Barkov tallied eight points while Huberdeau accumulated 12. On 2 April, Barkov tallied an assist to help Jágr tie Ron Francis for fourth place on the NHL's career points list. By the conclusion of the season, they combined for 19 goals and 35 assists for 54 points through 21 games. Barkov finished his sophomore season with 36 points, including 15 in the 21 games after Jágr arrived.

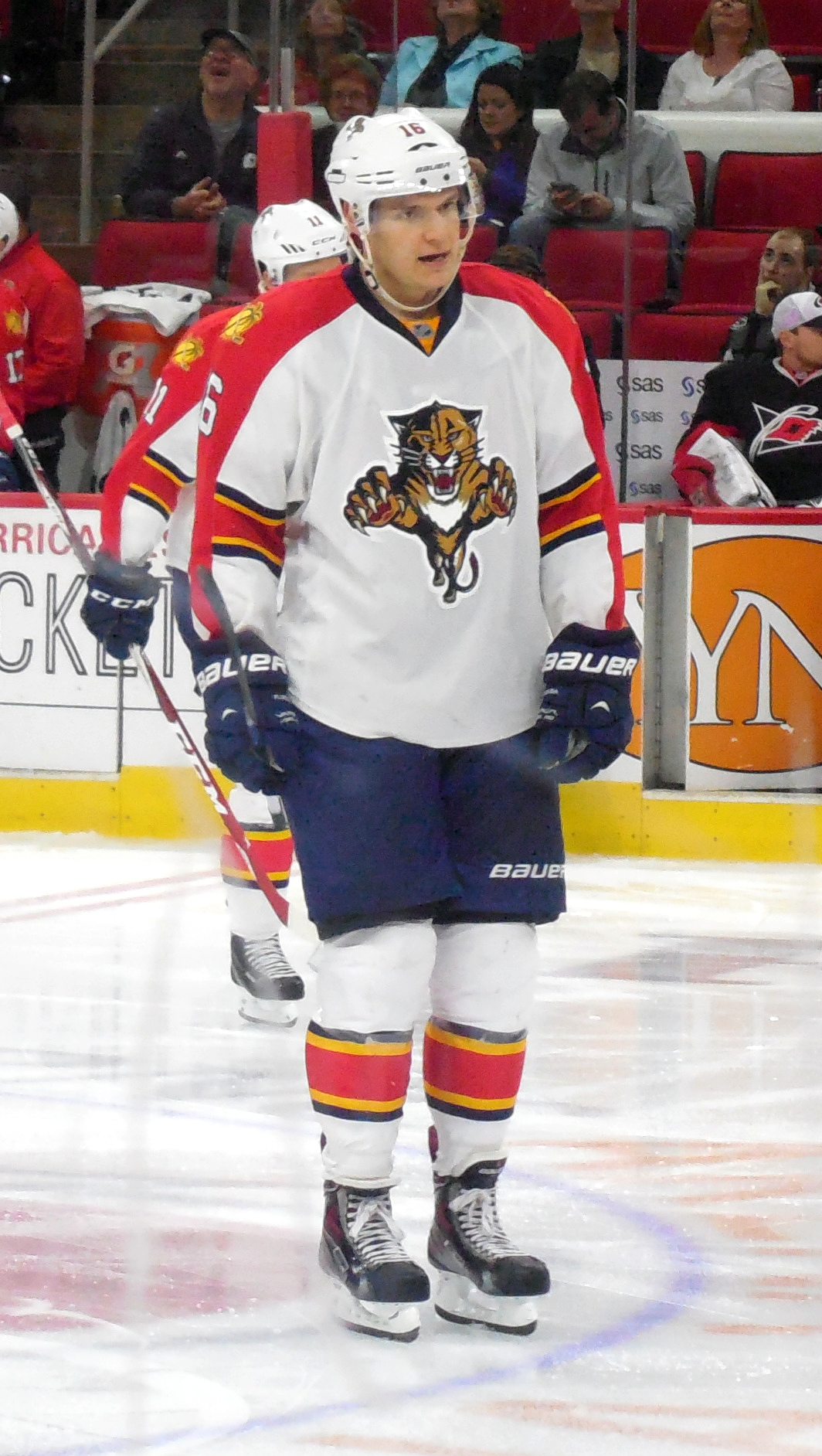
Barkov with the Florida Panthers in March 2015.

As a result of their success the previous season, Barkov was reunited with Huberdeau and Jágr to start the 2015–16 season. They began the season strong, combining for seven goals and 15 points in their first five games. Barkov himself had accumulated three goals and three assists for six points. However, Barkov was replaced on the top line with Nick Bjugstad after he suffered a broken hand on 22 October a game against the Chicago Blackhawks on a slap shot by Blackhawks' defenceman Niklas Hjalmarsson. An MRI determined that while he would not require surgery, Barkov was expected to miss two to four weeks. He subsequently missed 10 games to recover before returning on 16 November for a 1–0 win over the Tampa Bay Lightning. Barkov helped the Panthers experience their most successful December in franchise history by leading them with five goals and eight assists for 13 points through the month. By 13 January, Barkov had tallied 12 goals through 33 games and ranked third on the team in scoring with 28 points. Over a 13-game span, Barkov had three game-winning tallies, two game-winners in shootouts, and three multi-point games. Later that month, Barkov signed a six-year, $35.4 million contract extension with the Panthers. At the time of the signing, he had tallied 12 goals and 18 assists for 30 points through 38 games. On 9 February, Barkov suffered his second injury of the season after taking a hit from Detroit Red Wings forward Justin Abdelkader. Barkov subsequently missed six games to recover and returned to the Panthers lineup on 25 February. Before his return, the line tied for sixth in the NHL with a combined 22 goals. By the end of February, Barkov had 19 goals and 19 assists through 45 games. Barkov also led the team with eight power-play goals while Jágr led the Panthers with 17 even-strength goals. On 2 April, the line of Barkov, Huberdeau, and Jágr combined for seven points to help Florida set a franchise-record 44th win. During the game, Barkov had two assists and scored the game-winning goal to extend his five-game point streak. The following game, the Panthers qualified for the 2016 Stanley Cup playoffs for the first time since the 2011–12 season. A few games later, Barkov set a new career-high seven-game point streak as he scored his fifth goal in four games to help the Panthers clinch the Atlantic Division title. His goal tied Johan Garpenlöv for the franchise record for the fastest goal to start a game. Barkov finished with a career-best nine-game point streak of five goals and eight assists. He finished the 2015–16 season with a career-best 28 goals and 31 points for 59 points while also recording only eight penalty minutes in 66 games. His 28 goals also made him one of five 20-goal scorers for the Panthers for the first time in franchise history. Barkov's few penalties and generally clean play earned him a nomination for the Lady Byng Memorial Trophy as the league's most gentlemanly player. Barkov made his postseason debut in game 1 of their first-round matchup against the New York Islanders on 14 April 2016. He won 14 of 19 faceoffs as the Panthers fell to the Islanders 5–4. Following their game 2 win over the Islanders, Barkov tied with Reilly Smith for the team lead with 10 shots on goal. Despite his high shot count, the line of Jágr, Barkov, and Huberdeau had yet to score. This changed the following game, as Barkov scored his first career playoff goal in their 4–3 loss to the Islanders in game 3. Following this loss, the Panthers changed up their lineup and went with 11 forwards and seven defencemen for game 4. With 11 forwards, Barkov saw increased playing time and he led all Panthers players in ice time at 24:10 as they evened the series 2–2. Barkov scored his second goal of the playoffs in their 2–1 overtime loss to the Islanders in game 5. Entering game 6, Barkov and linemate Huberdeau had averaged 10 shots per game as a duo. The Panthers were ultimately eliminated in game 6 after Islanders captain John Tavares scored in double overtime. During the postseason, Barkov had averaged 25:54 of ice time per game, recorded the second most shots on net with 28, and had a 53-percent success rate in the face-off circle. He finished the playoffs with two goals and one assist for three points over six Stanley Cup playoff games. Following their elimination, Barkov joined Finland at the 2016 World Championship.

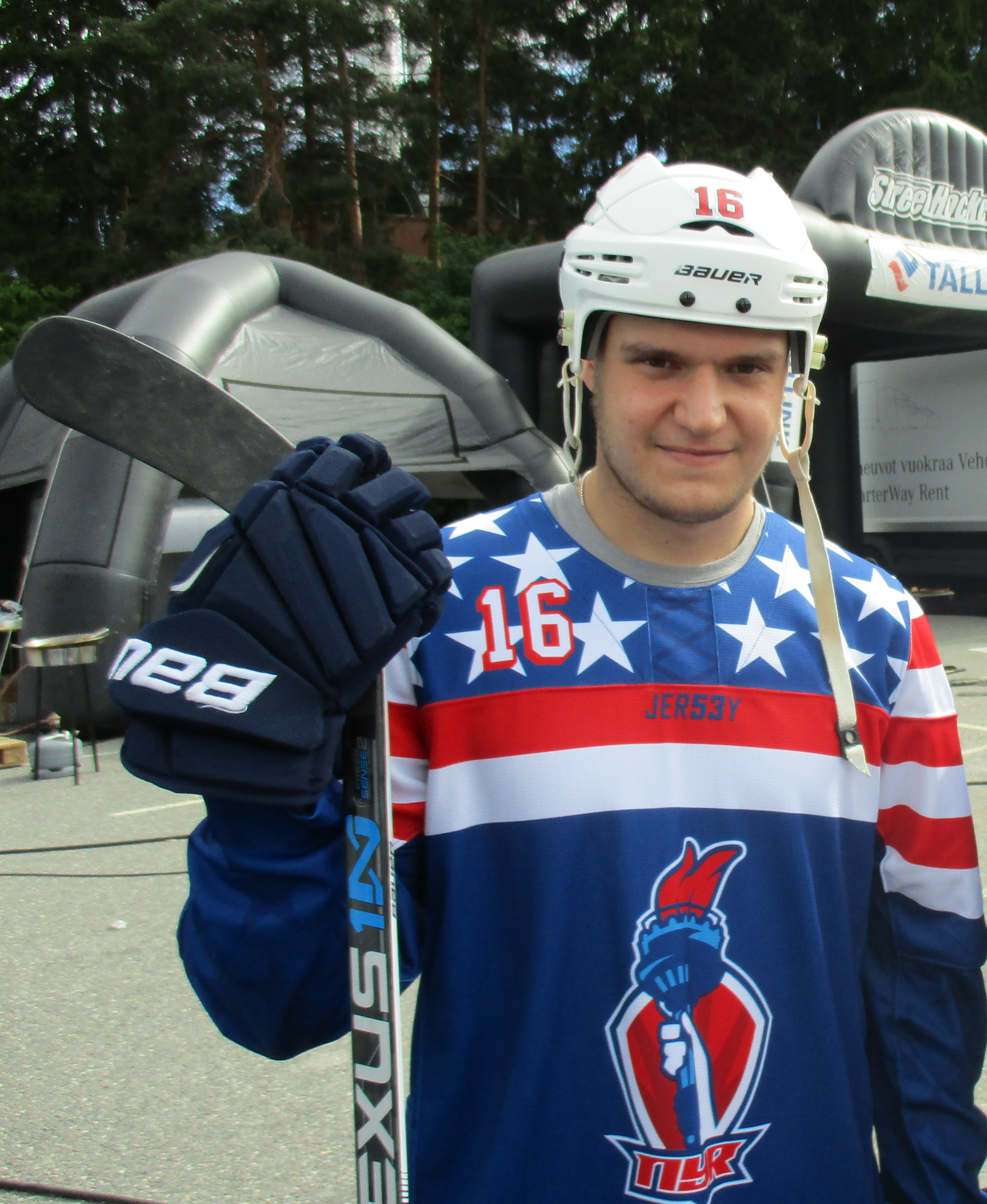
Barkov playing street hockey in Tampere in July 2016.

During the 2016 off-season, the Panthers made multiple moves to improve the team, including signing newly acquired Keith Yandle and Huberdeau to lengthy contracts. Yandle, who had been acquired from the New York Rangers, was expected to join Barkov, Jágr, and Huberdeau on the Panthers top powerplay unit. However, before the start of the 2016–17 season, Huberdeau suffered an ankle injury during a preseason game and was expected to miss 3–4 months. He was subsequently replaced on the top line with a recent free agent signing Jonathan Marchessault. Despite this loss, Barkov's line continued to thrive throughout October. By 21 October, Barkov and Marchessault were tied for the team lead in goals, assists, and points. However, Barkov soon experienced a goalless drought and he went 21 games without scoring a goal. He broke this drought by scoring the game-winning goal in overtime to lift the Panthers over the Detroit Red Wings. This immediately sparked an offensive increase, and he posted nine points in nine games after starting the season with 11 points in 20 games. By 14 December, Barkov tied with Marchessault for the team lead in points, while also ranking first among team forwards in both shots and game-winning goals. Although Barkov continued to produce points, at the end of December it was revealed that he had been playing through an injury and was expected to miss two to three weeks. At the time of the injury, he had an active five-game point streak and led the team with 27 points through 36 games. Barkov ended up missing 15 games with a back injury before returning with Huberdeau for a game against the Anaheim Ducks on 3 February 2017. Barkov made an immediate impact following his return by scoring two goals in his first three games back. This soon increased to five goals and three assists for eight points over six games. Although upper-body injury in April ended Barkov's season early, he finished the season ranking second on the team in points (52), third in goals (21), and second in game-winning goals (5) despite being limited to 61 games.

Leading up to the 2017 NHL expansion draft, Barkov was one of the players protected by the Panthers and made ineligible to be taken by the Vegas Golden Knights. However, the Panthers lost top players Marchessault and Smith to the Golden Knights to cut costs and protect more defencemen from the expansion draft. On top of those two, the Panthers also replaced Jágr during the off-season by re-acquiring Russian star and former Panther Evgenii Dadonov to replace him on Barkov's line. Although Barkov's line would continuously change throughout the year, Barkov had an immensely productive 2017–18 season. By mid-November, Barkov was averaging over a point per game and averaging 22:47 of ice time. After Dadonov suffered an injury in late-November, Denis Malgin was recalled from the American Hockey League to replace him on Barkov's top line. However, Barkov only played a few games with Malgin before suffering an upper-body injury in a game against the Winnipeg Jets. At the time of the injury, Barkov had ranked third on the team in points with 27 and second in goals with 10. He missed one game to recover before returning to the lineup and joining Vincent Trocheck and Huberdeau on the Panthers top line. In his return, he led all Panthers forwards in total ice time and ranked second in faceoff wins while also picking up an assist. By January, Barkov had recorded 14 goals and 26 assists for 40 points through 41 games to rank him second among Panthers players in assists. He also ranked first among all NHL forwards in average time on ice (22:29) and led the Panthers in assists registered at even strength. As such, he was named to the 2018 NHL All-Star Game for the first time in his career. Upon returning from the All-Star Game, Barkov registered four goals and six assists for 10 points over seven games in February. By the end of February, Barkov had accumulated 29 points over his last 25 games and 16 points over his last 11. He also led Panthers in points with 59 while also ranking second in goals with 21. His efforts were recognized by the NHL with their Third Star of the Week honor for the week ending on 4 March. While playing alongside Dadonov and Bjugstad on the Panthers top line since 22 February, Barkov set new career-highs in points and assists. By 8 March, the trio had combined for 14 goals and 19 assists for 33 points over seven games. Over the 19 games since returning from the NHL All-Star Game, Barkov had tallied 10 goals and 15 assists for 25 points. After tallying an assist in the Panthers 3–0 win over the Boston Bruins on 15 March, Barkov became the first Panthers player to reach 70 points in a season since Olli Jokinen in 2007–08. The following month, on 5 April, Barkov scored his 100th career NHL goal to rank him fifth in franchise history for single-season points with 78. Barkov's 27 goals and 51 assists would prove to be his final season total as he suffered a season-ending upper-body injury during a win over the Boston Bruins with two games remaining in the season. As he also finished the season with 14 minutes in penalties, Barkov earned his second Lady Byng Memorial Trophy finalist nomination.

==== 2018–2021: captaincy and return to playoffs ====
Following his career-best season, Barkov replaced Derek MacKenzie as the tenth captain in Panthers franchise history. Barkov continued to build on the previous season's success and hit new career-highs during the 2018–19 season. He began the season by tying for 10th place on the Panthers' all-time point list with his 251st NHL point on 11 October 2018 in a 5–4 loss to the Columbus Blue Jackets. Despite his early success, the Panthers struggled to produce wins and went 1–2–2 through their first five games. When the Panthers met with the Winnipeg Jets at the end of October 2018 for the NHL's 2018 NHL Global Series in Finland, Barkov had recorded two goals and six assists through nine games. The Panthers began to pick up wins once returning from the Global Series and they maintained a five-game winning streak from 1 to 15 November. During this stretch, Barkov added three goals and two assists while playing alongside Evgenii Dadonov and Mike Hoffman. By 21 November, Barkov had registered eight points over seven games and ranked first across the league in ice time among forwards and takeaways. At the start of December, Jonathan Huberdeau reunited with Barkov on the top line for the first time of the season. By 8 December, Barkov had recorded 10 goals and 26 points in 27 games while also maintaining a 64.2 winning percentage in the faceoff circle. As part of his growing success, Barkov recorded his first career NHL hat-trick in a 4–3 overtime win over the Toronto Maple Leafs on 15 December. Following the hat-trick, Barkov was considered an early contender for the Frank J. Selke Trophy as the league's best defensive forward. He led the team with four goals during a two-game winning streak while also drawing a league-high 25 penalties and forcing 52 takeaways. As a result of his overall play, Barkov was one of 31 players on the ballot to be voted into the 2019 NHL All-Star Game. Although Barkov was having a successful season individually, the Panthers as a team continued to struggle to win games. By early January, the Panthers had a 17–17–7 record causing head coach Bob Boughner to change up their lines. Malgin was moved up to the first line alongside Huberdeau and Barkov while Dadonov and Hoffman were moved to the second line. Following the NHL All-Star Game, Barkov ranked second on the Panthers in points with 47 and third in the NHL in takeaways. Barkov later noted his uptick in production coincided with the return of second-line center Vincent Trocheck. His return allowed Barkov to play less time on ice and be more fresh while playing. The Panthers subsequently won nine of 13 games since Trocheck's return. On 17 February, Barkov recorded his second career NHL hat-trick in a 6–3 win over the Montreal Canadiens. Barkov earned his first Second Star of the Week honor of the season on 25 February after he registered multiple points in three games during the week of 24 February. He also set new career highs with 11 power-play goals and 24 power-play points. Shortly after this honor, Barkov become the first Panther to record five assists in a one game as the Panthers went 6–2 over the Minnesota Wild on 8 March. During the game, the Panthers top line of Barkov, Huberdeau, and Dadonov combined for 11 assists, marking the most combined assists by three players in NHL history. A few games later, Barkov became the second player in franchise history to reach the 80-point mark in a season. As linemate Huberdeau later joined Barkov with 80 points, the two became the first pair of Panthers to reach 80 points in the same season. During a game against the Washington Capitals on 1 April, Barkov recorded three assists to tie Pavel Bure's franchise record of 94 points in a season. Barkov would later surpass Bure's record by tallying a goal and an assist in an overtime win against the New Jersey Devils to finish with 96 points. (Note: This record was later passed by Huberdeau in 2022.) On 18 April, for the third-straight season, Barkov was named a finalist for the Lady Byng Memorial Trophy, alongside Ryan O'Reilly of the St. Louis Blues and Sean Monahan of the Calgary Flames, respectively. Barkov was eventually named the winner of the trophy as he had accumulated only four minor penalties during the 2018–19 season, becoming only the second player in Panthers history (joining Brian Campbell in 2011–12) to receive the award.

During the 2019 off-season, the Panthers underwent numerous changes. Longtime goaltender Roberto Luongo retired and the Panthers signed two-time Vezina Trophy winner and free agent Sergei Bobrovsky from the Columbus Blue Jackets to fill the void left by Luongo. Leading up to the 2019–20 season, Barkov was ranked as the fourth-best center in the league by hockey pundits at the NHL Network. Barkov started the season strong, posting 10 points during the Panthers' eight-game point streak. Four of Barkov's points, all assists, came during a game against the Calgary Flames on 24 October 2019. He finished the month of October tied with Huberdeau for the team lead in scoring with 15 points. Between 22 October and 21 November, Barkov recorded seven goals and 16 assists, including nine multi-point games, for 23 points. During this stretch, Barkov and his linemates Huberdeau and Dadonov had combined for 39 points through nine games. However, the line began to struggle through December and head coach Joel Quenneville replaced Bakov's linemates with Frank Vatrano and Brett Connolly in mid-December. On 16 December, Barkov scored his 146th career NHL goal to move past Stephen Weiss for fourth in franchise history. Upon playing with his new linemates, Barkov maintained a three-game point streak with one goal and three assists. However, after the Panthers fell to the Tampa Bay Lightning 6–1 on 23 December, Barkov was reunited with his former linemates Huberdeau and Dadonov. While playing with his usual linemates on 16 January, Barkov picked up the 395th point of his career against the Los Angeles Kings to secure third place on the franchise's all-time scoring list. Barkov helped the Panthers maintain a 28–17–5 record by 3 February before suffering a lower-body injury during a 4–0 loss to the Montreal Canadiens. At the time of the injury, he had tallied 16 goals and 38 assists for 54 points through 50 games. Upon returning from the injury, Barkov tallied his 400th NHL point and 249th NHL assist, tying Stephen Weiss for second in Panthers history. A few games later, Barkov tallied his 152nd NHL goal to tie Pavel Bure for third in Panthers history. Following a loss to the Los Angeles Kings on 21 February, Barkov hit the 20-goal mark for the fifth straight season and he ranked second on the Panthers in scoring with 60 points. When the NHL paused play due to the COVID-19 pandemic, Barkov had 20 goals and 42 assists for 62 points through 66 games. In late July, Barkov and the Panthers returned for the 2020 Stanley Cup Qualifiers against the New York Islanders. During their first-round series, Barkov tallied one goal and three assists for four points through four games. Barkov and Huberdeau were the only Panthers forwards who had more than one point in the series.

During the 2020 off-season, Barkov teamed up with fellow Finn Patrik Laine to co-host a charity golf tournament in support of the Association for Persons with Intellectual Disabilities. The Panthers also traded Mike Matheson and Colton Sceviour to the Penguins for right winger Patric Hörnqvist. Upon signing with the team, Hörnqvist shared his excitement and praised Barkov as being "the most underrated player in the league." Barkov entered the pandemic-shortened 2020–21 season with new linemates Anthony Duclair and Carter Verhaeghe, while Huberdeau joined Alexander Wennberg and Hörnqvist on the second line. Barkov and his new linemates finished the month of January combining for seven goals and 13 assists for 20 points as the Panthers maintained a point streak since opening night. By 5 February, Barkov ranked second on the Panthers in scoring with 11 points as the Panthers point streak reached eight games. The line also maintained 60.50 percent of shot attempts while dominating shot attempts, high-danger shot attempts, scoring chances, and expected goals. During the Panthers 6–4 win over the Tampa Bay Lightning on 15 February, Barkov earned two points to move him past Olli Jokinen for second-most points in franchise history. Near the end of February, Barkov was eventually reunited with Huberdeau while Vatrano was moved to the second line. Shortly after the two were reunited, Barkov played in his 500th career NHL game on 1 March against the Carolina Hurricanes. At the time of this milestone, he had recorded 163 goals and 266 assists with the Panthers franchise. However, after Mason Marchment tallied five points over six games, Huberdeau was returned to the second line in place of Marchment. In his first game with Marchment, Barkov tallied an assist on his goal to extend his point streak to a season-high six games. Despite suffering a shoulder injury on 22 March, Barkov was recognized with the NHL's Central Division Star of the Month for accumulating five goals and 11 assists through 11 games to spark the Panthers to a 10–5–1 March record. On 27 April, Barkov scored two goals and an assist as the Panthers beat the Lightning 7–4 and clinched a spot in the playoffs. He finished the regular season with a team-leading 26 goals and 58 points through 50 games to become the first player in franchise history to register six consecutive 50-point and 20-goal seasons. Barkov subsequently set another franchise milestone by becoming the first Florida Panthers player to win the Selke Trophy as the best defensive forward in the NHL. As the Panthers qualified for the 2021 playoffs, Barkov added one goal and six assists for seven points in their first-round loss to the defending Stanley Cup champion and eventual repeated champion Tampa Bay Lightning.

==== 2021–present: New contract and Stanley Cup contention ====
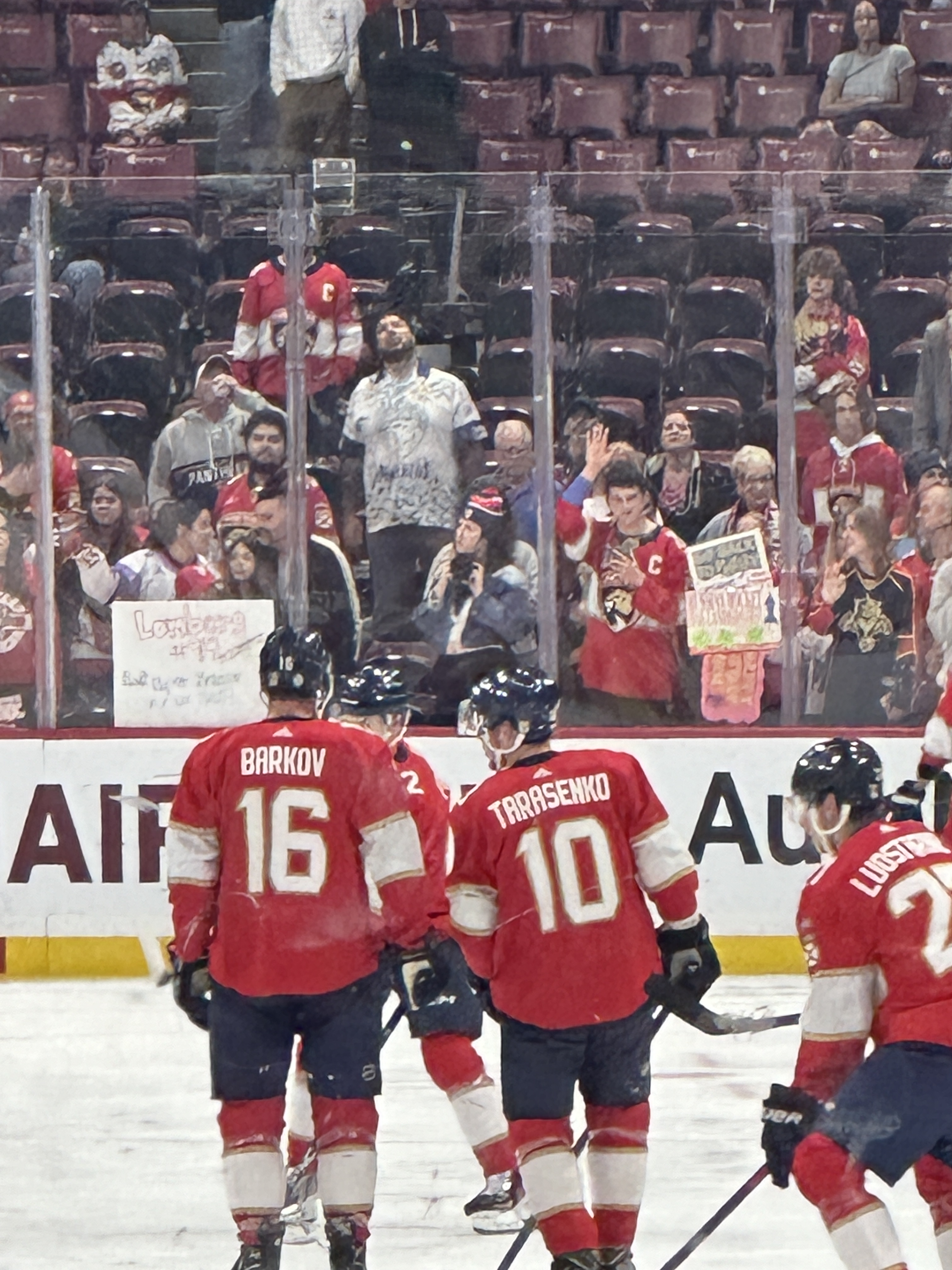
Barkov (left) with Vladimir Tarasenko during a game in March 2024. Barkov would go on to captain the Panthers to their first Stanley Cup championship in franchise history later that season.

Following his Selke win, Barkov signed an eight-year, $80 million contract extension to remain with the Panthers on 8 October 2021. Barkov was reunited with Duclair and Verhaeghe on the Panthers top line to start the 2021–22 season. While playing with these linemates, Barkov led the team with two goals and three assists for five points through the first three games. The trio helped the Panthers win eight straight games to start the season before losing on 30 October to the Boston Bruins in overtime. Despite the loss, they continued to maintain their point streak and Barkov ranked second on the team with nine points. Two games later, Barkov tied Jokinen for the most goals in franchise history as he scored the 188th goal of his career in a 5–4 win over the Capitals. However, before he could surpass Jokinen, Barkov suffered a lower-body injury and was ruled out for the next days game against the Carolina Hurricanes. He missed one game before returning for the Panthers first regulation loss of the season against the New York Rangers. In his return, Barkov had an assist and six shots on goal in 20:13 of ice time. On 9 November, Barkov scored the franchise-leading 189th goal to pass Jokinen and move into first all-time in Panthers franchise history. A few days later, Barkov was listed as week-to-week after he suffered a lower-body injury following a knee-on-knee collision with New York Islanders defenceman Scott Mayfield. At the time of the injury, he led the team with nine goals and 17 points in 15 games. He subsequently missed eight games before returning to the lineup for their game against the St. Louis Blues on 8 December. He scored less than seven minutes into his first game back but did not finish the game as he suffered another injury in the third period. Barkov missed another four games with upper-body injury before playing 19:26 and recording two shots on goal in his return on 29 December against the New York Rangers. On 27 January, Barkov recorded his 200th NHL goal and 500th NHL point to help the Panthers defeat the Vegas Golden Knights 4–1. He became the first player in franchise history to score 200 goals for the Panthers. By the end of February, Barkov had accumulated 25 goals through 40 games to maintain a 1.85 goals per 60-minute record. In addition to leading the team in power-play goals with eight, he also tied for first in the league in shorthanded goals with four. From 1 January to 24 March, Barkov had accumulated 16 goals and 26 assists through 31 games. As the Panthers qualified for the 2022 playoffs, Barkov was recognized as the NHL's Second Star of the Week for the week ending on 3 April. He earned this honor after he recorded two points through four games to tie Connor McDavid for the League lead in goals and points. Barkov led the Panthers to the Presidents' Trophy with the league's best record as he finished the regular season with 39 goals, 49 assists and 88 points through 67 games. He also posted a career-best 57 percent success rate in faceoffs and led his team's forwards in average ice time. As a result of his overall play, Barkov was nominated for the Selke Trophy for the second consecutive season. Barkov did not make a huge impact during the first few games against the eighth seeded Washington Capitals but gradually found his offensive game later in the series. As the Panthers beat the Capitals in six games, Barkov ranked third on the Panthers with two goals and four assists for six points in all six games. His efforts helped the Panthers advance past the first round of the playoffs for the first time since 1996. The Panthers struggled against the two time defending Stanley Cup champion and fifth-seeded Tampa Bay Lightning and Barkov ended their series with only one assist as they were swept in four games.

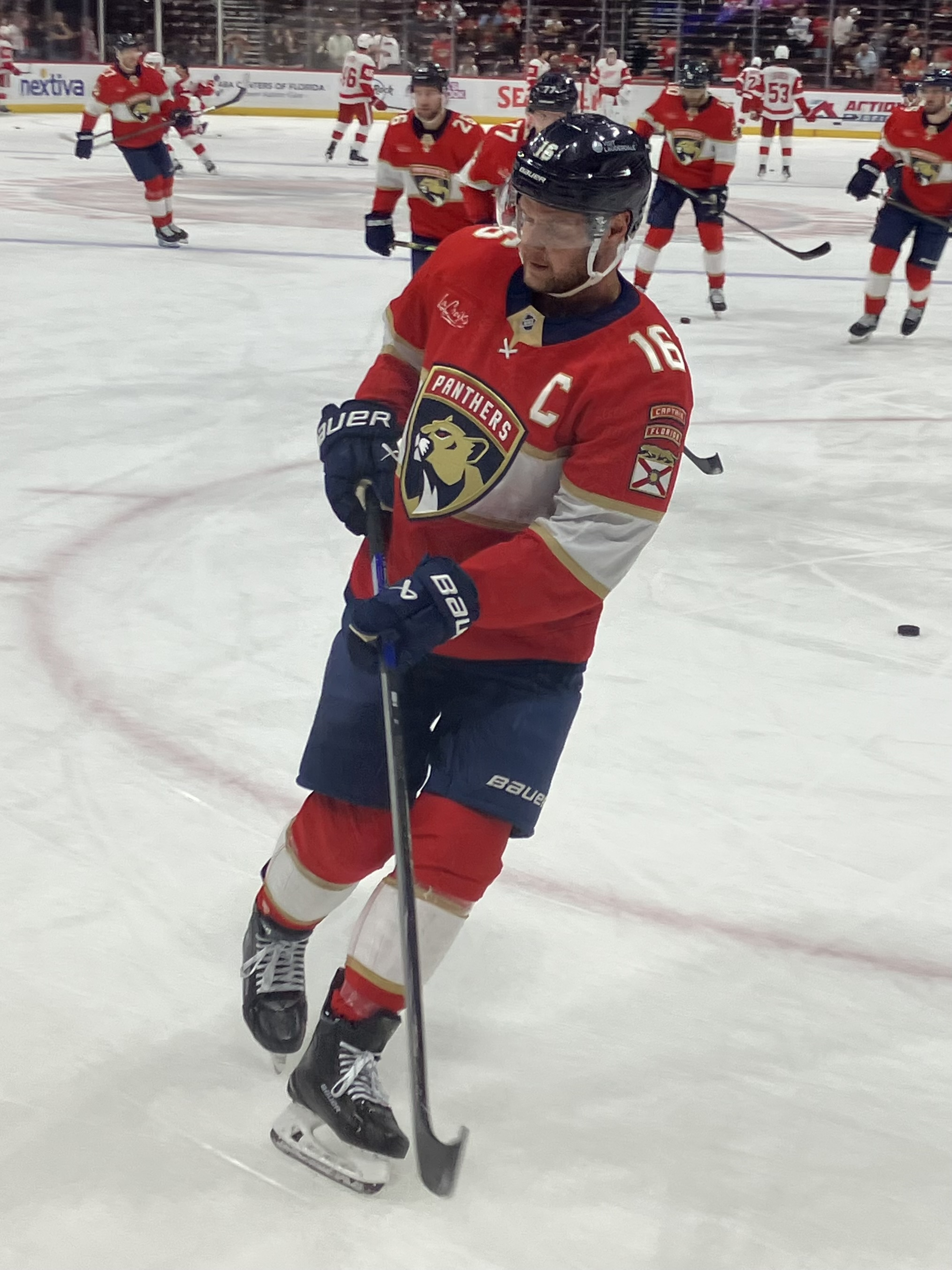
Barkov with the Panthers in April 2025

During the 2022 off-season, the Panthers acquired Matthew Tkachuk in exchange for Huberdeau and defenceman MacKenzie Weegar. It was expected that Tkachuk would play alongside Barkov and Sam Reinhart on the Panthers' top line where Huberdeau played. Barkov skated in his 600th career NHL game and registered his 71st career multi-assist game on 19 October 2022 during the Panthers home opener against the Philadelphia Flyers. By the end of October, Barkov tied for second on the Panthers in points with eight and first among the team's forwards in ice time per game. However, the following two months were rife with struggle for both Barkov and the Panthers. By American Thanksgiving, the Panthers sat fifth in the Atlantic Division with a 10–8–2 record. Barkov also missed numerous games throughout November and December due to non-COVID related illnesses and injuries. He missed one game in November against the Dallas Stars and six more in early December. Barkov then missed the final three games heading into the Christmas break after suffering a lower-body injury at New Jersey. Following the break, Barkov recorded the fastest hat trick to start a game in franchise history by scoring all three of his goals within the first 15:22 of the first period. As a result, Barkov surpassed both Steven Reinprecht's previous record for fastest goals and Scott Mellanby's for most power-play goals in franchise history. By 14 January, Barkov had registered 11 goals and 23 assists for 34 points through 34 games. He went on a hot streak through eight games and accumulated six goals and nine assists over that stretch. Although he was not originally selected for the 2023 NHL All-Star Game, he was chosen to replace the injured Auston Matthews. Leading up to the All-Star Game, Barkov maintained a nine-game point streak where he recorded four goals and nine assists for 13 points. Upon returning from the All-Star Game, Barkov and the Panthers became more consistent and started winning more games. In February, the Panthers clinched their first three-game win streak of the season and continued to improve their overall record. Barkov's February was still full of injuries as he missed a total of four games over the month. The month of March saw the Panthers pull within a playoff position by winning three consecutive games before falling out due to a four-game losing streak. On 20 March, during a game against the Detroit Red Wings, Barkov passed former teammate Jonathan Huberdeau to become the Florida Panthers' all-time leading scorer with 614 points. A few days later, he passed Stephen Weiss for second place on the franchise's all-time games played list. Over the final eight games of the season, Barkov, Tkachuk, Reinhart, and Brandon Montour all accumulated 12 points to help the Panthers clinch the second wildcard spot in the Eastern Conference. In the second to last game of the season on 8 April, the Penguins fell to the Chicago Blackhawks, resulting in the Panthers qualifying for the playoffs by one point as the eighth and final seed in the Eastern Conference. Barkov finished the season with 23 goals and 55 assists for 78 points, and placed eighth in Selke Trophy voting. He was also nominated by the Panthers for the King Clancy Memorial Trophy as a player who "best exemplifies leadership qualities on and off the ice and has made a noteworthy humanitarian contribution in his community." He was specifically recognized for his three-year partnership with Joe DiMaggio Children's Hospital in which he donated $1,600 for every goal he scored and $800 for every assist. He eventually would not be named a top three finalist by the NHL. After the 2022–23 season, Barkov and the Panthers would go on a lengthy run through the 2023 playoffs. They met with the Presidents' Trophy-winning Boston Bruins in the first round and beat them in seven games. During the first few games of the series, Barkov and the Panthers top line received criticism for their low production. In game 6, Barkov tallied a goal and an assist to help force a game 7 against the Bruins. Following their win, Barkov and the Panthers faced off against the Toronto Maple Leafs in the second round, whom they defeated in five games. When the Panthers met with the Carolina Hurricanes in the conference finals, Barkov had begun to return to his former scoring pace. He quickly tallied two goals and an assist in the first two games of the series before suffering an injury in game 3. His goal in game 2 secured him second place on the Panthers' all-time list, four behind Carter Verhaeghe. After missing the majority of game 3, he returned to the Panthers lineup for game 4, and helped sweep the Hurricanes. As a result of the win, the Panthers received the Prince of Wales Trophy for the first time since 1996. Heading into game 1 of the 2023 Stanley Cup Final against the Vegas Golden Knights, Barkov had already set new career-highs in goals and assists through 16 games. Barkov added two more points in the series to finish the postseason with 11 assists and 16 points through 21 games.

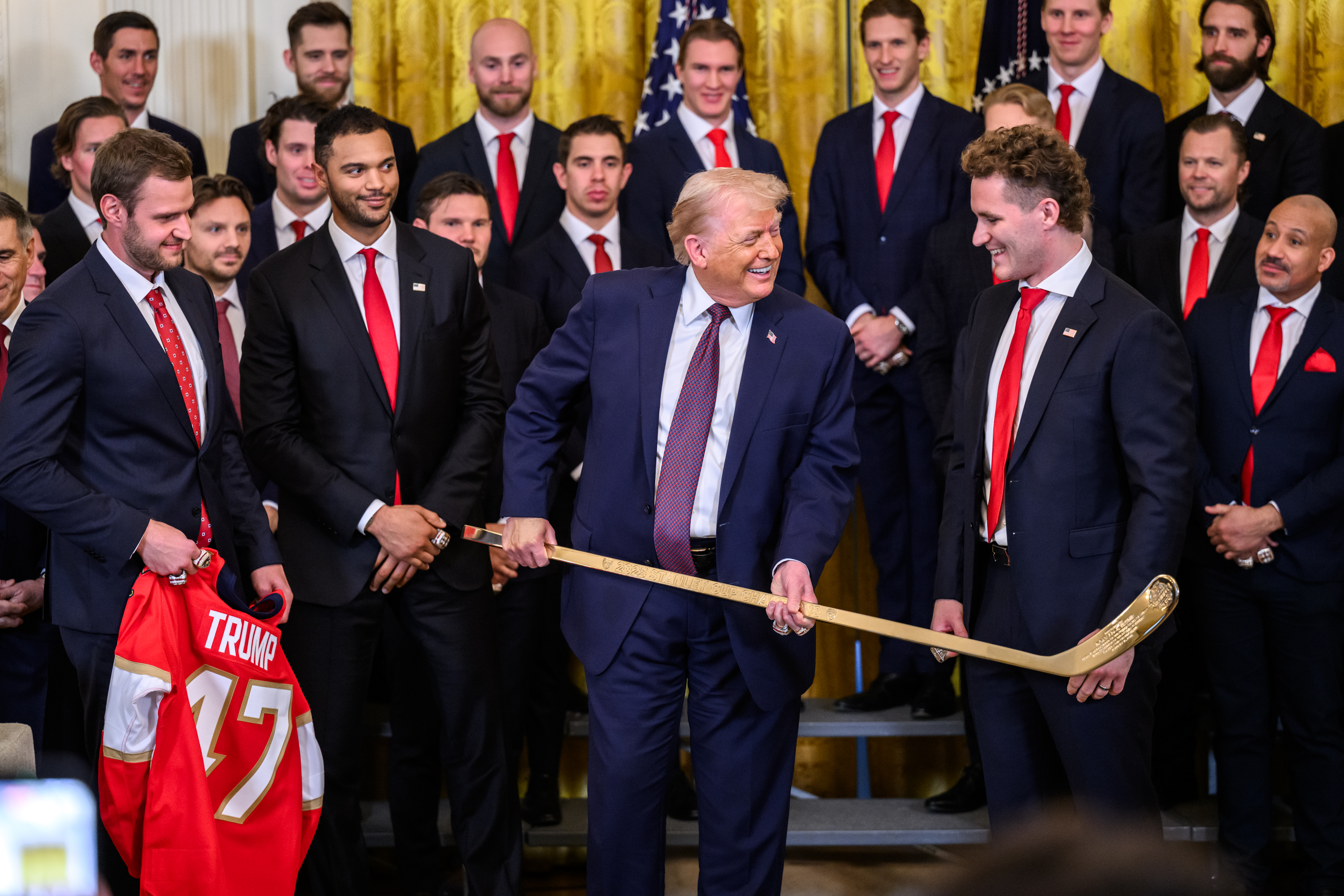
The Panthers celebrated their second consecutive Stanley Cup championship at the White House on 15 January 2026. Barkov is pictured on the left.

Barkov would win his second Selke Trophy at the end of the 2023–24 season. Barkov and the Panthers would reach a second consecutive Stanley Cup Final where they would defeat the Edmonton Oilers in seven games for the Panthers first Stanley Cup in franchise history and first championship for Barkov's career.

The 2024–25 season saw Barkov record 20 goals and 51 assists for 71 points in 67 games, en route to his third Selke Trophy. Barkov also won his first King Clancy Memorial Trophy for his continued work with Joe DiMaggio Children's Hospital. Barkov and the Panthers would eventually clinch a third consecutive Stanley Cup Final and repeat as Stanley Cup champions for a second consecutive year once again beating the Oilers in the final, this time in six games. In the process, Barkov became the second player to win both the Selke Trophy and Stanley Cup in consecutive seasons, after Bob Gainey did so in 1978 and 1979.

Prior to the start of the 2025–26 season, Barkov suffered a knee injury during a practice session on 25 September 2025. The following day, Barkov announced that he underwent surgery to repair anterior cruciate ligament (ACL) and medial collateral ligament (MCL) damage; he was slated to likely miss the entire season and the 2026 Winter Olympics.

Barkov returned from injury at the start of the 2026–27 season and played in the first two games before suffering an injury in a game against the San Jose Sharks on 1 October 2026, that put him on long-term injured reserve (LTIR) list and he was scheduled to miss at least 10 games.

== International play ==
Medal record

Men's ice hockey

Representing Finland

Winter Olympics
Bronze medal – third place	2014 Sochi	

World Championships
Gold medal – first place	2026 Switzerland	
Silver medal – second place	2016 Russia	

As a Finnish native, Barkov has represented his homeland at both the junior and senior levels on the international stage. He made his international debut with the Finland under-18 team during the 2011 Ivan Hlinka Memorial Tournament. Barkov then competed in two international tournaments in 2012. In his first tournament with the Finland junior team during the 2012 World Junior Championships, Barkov became the youngest Finnish player chosen to represent the team. During the tournament, Barkov surpassed Sidney Crosby as the youngest player to ever score in the World Junior Championships. His goal came when he was 16 years and four months old, just 21 days younger than Crosby. He finished the tournament with one goal and four points in seven games for the fourth-placed Finland. Barkov would also represent the Finland under-18 team during the 2012 World U18 Championships where they placed fourth. Barkov represented Finland for the final time at the junior level during the 2013 World Junior Championships. During the tournament, he tallied three goals and seven points through six games as Finland placed seventh and failed to medal.

As a result of his success, Barkov was invited to represent the Finland senior team in the 2014 Winter Olympics, but suffered a knee injury after two games and was unable to continue playing in the tournament. While Barkov was limited to just two games, Finland clinched a bronze medal following a win over the United States. The following year, Barkov made his senior team debut at the 2015 World Championship. In his first game at the senior level, Barkov recorded one goal and logged 15:05 of ice time in Finland's 3–0 win over Denmark. He finished the tournament with four goals and three assists for seven points through eight games as Finland failed to medal. In 2016, Barkov and then-Florida teammate Jussi Jokinen were selected to represent Finland at the 2016 World Championship. He accumulated nine points in nine games while playing on the top line with Patrik Laine and Jussi Jokinen. As a result of this success, the lines remained the same for the 2016 World Cup of Hockey. During the tournament, Barkov went pointless over three games as Finland failed to medal.

== Career statistics ==
=== Regular season and playoffs ===
			Regular season					Playoffs
Season	Team	League	GP	G	A	Pts	PIM	GP	G	A	Pts	PIM
2010–11	Tappara	Jr. A	25	5	12	17	6	—	—	—	—	—
2011–12	Tappara	Jr. A	5	2	3	5	2	—	—	—	—	—
2011–12	Tappara	SM-l	32	7	9	16	4	—	—	—	—	—
2012–13	Tappara	SM-l	53	21	27	48	8	5	0	5	5	2
2013–14	Florida Panthers	NHL	54	8	16	24	10	—	—	—	—	—
2014–15	Florida Panthers	NHL	71	16	20	36	16	—	—	—	—	—
2015–16	Florida Panthers	NHL	66	28	31	59	8	6	2	1	3	2
2016–17	Florida Panthers	NHL	61	21	31	52	10	—	—	—	—	—
2017–18	Florida Panthers	NHL	79	27	51	78	14	—	—	—	—	—
2018–19	Florida Panthers	NHL	82	35	61	96	8	—	—	—	—	—
2019–20	Florida Panthers	NHL	66	20	42	62	18	4	1	3	4	2
2020–21	Florida Panthers	NHL	50	26	32	58	14	6	1	6	7	2
2021–22	Florida Panthers	NHL	67	39	49	88	18	10	2	5	7	4
2022–23	Florida Panthers	NHL	68	23	55	78	8	21	5	11	16	10
2023–24	Florida Panthers	NHL	73	23	57	80	24	24	8	14	22	8
2024–25	Florida Panthers	NHL	67	20	51	71	16	23	6	16	22	4
Liiga totals			85	28	36	64	12	5	0	5	5	2
NHL totals			804	286	496	782	164	94	25	56	81	32

=== International ===
Year	Team	Event	Result	GP	G	A	Pts	PIM
2011	Finland	IH18	4th	5	3	4	7	2
2012	Finland	WJC	4th	7	1	3	4	0
2012	Finland	WJC18	4th	7	1	2	3	27
2013	Finland	WJC	7th	6	3	4	7	6
2014	Finland	OG	3rd place, bronze medalist(s)	2	0	1	1	2
2015	Finland	WC	6th	8	3	4	7	4
2016	Finland	WC	2nd place, silver medalist(s)	9	3	6	9	2
2016	Finland	WCH	8th	3	0	0	0	0
2025	Finland	4NF	4th	3	1	1	2	2
2026	Finland	WC	1st place, gold medalist(s)	10	3	8	11	2
Junior totals				25	8	13	21	35
Senior totals				35	10	20	30	12

== Awards and honours ==
Award	Year	Ref
NHL
NHL All-Star Game	2018, 2023	
Lady Byng Memorial Trophy	2019	
Frank J. Selke Trophy	2021, 2024, 2025	
Stanley Cup champion	2024, 2025	
King Clancy Memorial Trophy	2025	
Quarter-Century First Team (FLA)	2025	
International
World Championship All-Star Team	2026	
Other
Finnish Sports Personality of the Year	2024	

== Personal life ==
Barkov's long-time partner is the Czech professional tennis player Marie Bouzková; he has described tennis as his favorite sport outside of hockey.

Barkov has a young son, also named Sasha, from a previous relationship with an American woman.

== Notes ==
Awards and achievements
Preceded by Mike Matheson	Florida Panthers first-round draft pick 2013	Succeeded by Aaron Ekblad
Preceded by William Karlsson	Lady Byng Memorial Trophy winner 2019	Succeeded by Nathan MacKinnon
Preceded by Sean Couturier; Patrice Bergeron	Frank J. Selke Trophy winner 2021; 2024, 2025	Succeeded by Patrice Bergeron; Nick Suzuki
Preceded by Anders Lee	King Clancy Memorial Trophy winner 2025	Succeeded by Marcus Foligno
Sporting positions
Preceded by Derek MacKenzie	Florida Panthers captain 2018–present	Incumbent
