= Alexander Barkov =

Aleksandr Barkov Sr.
- Born: 17 April 1965 (age 61) Novosibirsk, Russian SFSR, Soviet Union
- Height: 6 ft 3 in (191 cm)
- Weight: 209 lb (95 kg; 14 st 13 lb)
- Position: Centre
- Shot: Left
- Played for: Sibir Novosibirsk; Spartak Moscow; Lions Courmaosta; Tappara
- National team: Russia
- Playing career: 1983–2004

Aleksandr Edgardovich Barkov (Russian: Александр Эдгардович Барков; born April 17, 1965) is a Russian former professional ice hockey player and coach. He played a long career for Sibir Novosibirsk and Spartak Moscow in the Soviet Union, and later for Tappara of the Finnish SM-liiga. His son, Aleksander Barkov Jr., was born in Finland and is the captain of the Florida Panthers in the NHL.

== Career statistics ==
=== Regular season and playoffs ===
			Regular season					Playoffs
Season	Team	League	GP	G	A	Pts	PIM	GP	G	A	Pts	PIM
1982–83	Sibir Novosibirsk	Soviet-2	59	8	25	33	18	16	7	1	8	6
1983–84	Sibir Novosibirsk	Soviet	32	1	8	9	10	—	—	—	—	—
1984–85	Sibir Novosibirsk	Soviet-2	58	17	16	33	18	—	—	—	—	—
1985–86	Sibir Novosibirsk	Soviet-2	64	38	30	68	22	—	—	—	—	—
1986–87	Sibir Novosibirsk	Soviet-2	72	25	19	44	64	—	—	—	—	—
1987–88	Sibir Novosibirsk	Soviet-2	72	29	40	69	50	—	—	—	—	—
1988–89	Spartak Moscow	Soviet	33	3	14	17	26	—	—	—	—	—
1989–90	Spartak Moscow	Soviet	46	9	17	26	29	—	—	—	—	—
1989–90	Traktor Lipetsk	Soviet-3	2	1	0	1	0	—	—	—	—	—
1990–91	Spartak Moscow	Soviet	45	11	14	25	26	—	—	—	—	—
1991–92	Spartak Moscow	CIS	35	17	12	29	18	6	1	1	2	6
1992–93	Spartak Moscow	IHL	42	16	29	45	22	3	1	2	3	0
1993–94	Lions Courmaosta	ITA	25	15	28	43	8	—	—	—	—	—
1994–95	Tappara	SM-l	50	18	22	40	22	—	—	—	—	—
1995–96	Tappara	SM-l	50	20	26	46	53	4	2	2	4	2
1996–97	Tappara	SM-l	50	17	25	42	28	3	0	4	4	4
1997–98	Tappara	SM-l	48	12	29	41	26	4	1	0	1	2
1998–99	Tappara	SM-l	53	13	29	42	50	—	—	—	—	—
1999–2000	Tappara	SM-l	54	21	35	56	28	2	1	1	2	0
2000–01	Tappara	SM-l	56	14	36	50	32	10	2	9	11	4
2001–02	Tappara	SM-l	56	6	40	46	30	10	3	4	7	0
2002–03	Tappara	SM-l	56	10	23	33	30	15	1	5	6	4
2003–04	Tappara	SM-l	45	4	16	20	30	—	—	—	—	—
Soviet-2 totals			325	117	130	247	172	16	7	1	8	6
Soviet/CIS totals			191	48	58	106	109	6	1	1	2	6
SM-l totals			518	135	281	416	329	48	10	25	35	16

=== International ===
Year	Team	Event	GP	G	A	Pts	PIM
1992	Russia	WC	6	0	4	4	2
1997	Russia	WC	9	3	5	8	27
1999	Russia	WC	6	0	0	0	0
Senior totals			21	3	9	12	29
