= 1981–82 I-Divisioona season =

The 1981–82 I-Divisioona season was the eighth season of the I-Divisioona, the second level of Finnish ice hockey. 10 teams participated in the league, and JYP Jyväskylä and FoPS Forssa qualified for the promotion/relegation round of the SM-liiga.

== Regular season ==
	Club	GP	W	T	L	GF–GA	Pts
1.	HPK Hämeenlinna	36	23	7	6	189:125	53
2.	FoPS Forssa	36	21	7	8	207:143	49
3.	Vaasan Sport	36	21	4	11	180:154	46
4.	JYP Jyväskylä	36	17	5	14	186:132	39
5.	JoKP Joensuu	36	16	6	14	160:144	38
6.	SaPKo Savonlinna	36	15	5	16	158:170	35
7.	Koo-Vee	36	12	7	17	158:181	31
8.	Valtit Varkaus	36	13	5	18	121:194	31
9.	KooKoo Kouvola	36	9	4	23	113:152	22
10.	Jäähonka Espoo	36	5	6	25	128:204	16

== Playoffs ==
=== Final round ===
- Vaasan Sport - SaPKo Savonlinna 2:0 (8:2, 5:4)
- JYP Jyväskylä - JoKP Joensuu 2:1 (7:5, 4:5, 4:3)

=== Second round ===
- HPK Hämeenlinna - JYP Jyväskylä 0:3 (3:5, 3:6, 1:3)
- FoPS Forssa - Vaasan Sport 3:2 (3:2, 5:7, 11:1, 1:4, 10:4)
