= 1974–75 I-Divisioona season =

The 1974-75 I-Divisioona season was the first season of the I-Divisioona, the second level of Finnish ice hockey. Eight teams participated in the league, and Vaasan Sport won the championship.

== Regular season ==
	Club	GP	W	T	L	GF–GA	Pts
1.	Vaasan Sport	28	23	0	5	188:94	46
2.	FoPS Forssa	28	20	2	6	179:100	42
3.	HPK Hämeenlinna	28	14	2	12	135:132	30
4.	PiTa Helsinki	28	11	3	14	117:117	25
5.	Kärpät Oulu	28	12	1	15	130:158	25
6.	KooKoo Kouvola	28	9	5	14	113:134	23
7.	SaPKo Savonlinna	28	10	3	15	92:141	23
8.	JYP Jyväskylä	28	3	4	21	116:194	10
