= Juha Hietanen =

Finnish ice hockey player

- Born: April 20, 1955 (age 69); Helsinki, Finland
- Height: 5 ft 10 in (178 cm)
- Weight: 178 lb (81 kg; 12 st 10 lb)
- Position: Forward
- Shot: Left
- Played for: HPK
- Playing career: 1973–1987

Juha Hietanen (born April 20, 1955) is a Finnish former professional ice hockey forward.

Hietanen played most of his career with HPK, playing from 1973 to 1985 and from 1986 to 1987. Having played mostly in the 1. Divisioona, the team were promoted to the SM-liiga in 1983. Hietanen played 33 games during the 1983-84 SM-liiga season and notched up three assists. It would be his only season in Finland's top-tier league as HPK were relegated straight back to the 1. Divisioona.

In 1985, Hietanen joined Ketterä for one season before returning to HPK the following year in his last season before retiring. HPK have retired the number 17 in Hietanen's honour.

His father Aarno Hietanen played in the SM-sarja for Tarmo between 1949 and 1959 and his son Juuso Hietanen currently plays for HC Ambrì-Piotta of the National League.
