= Juuso Hietanen =

Finnish ice hockey player (born 1985)

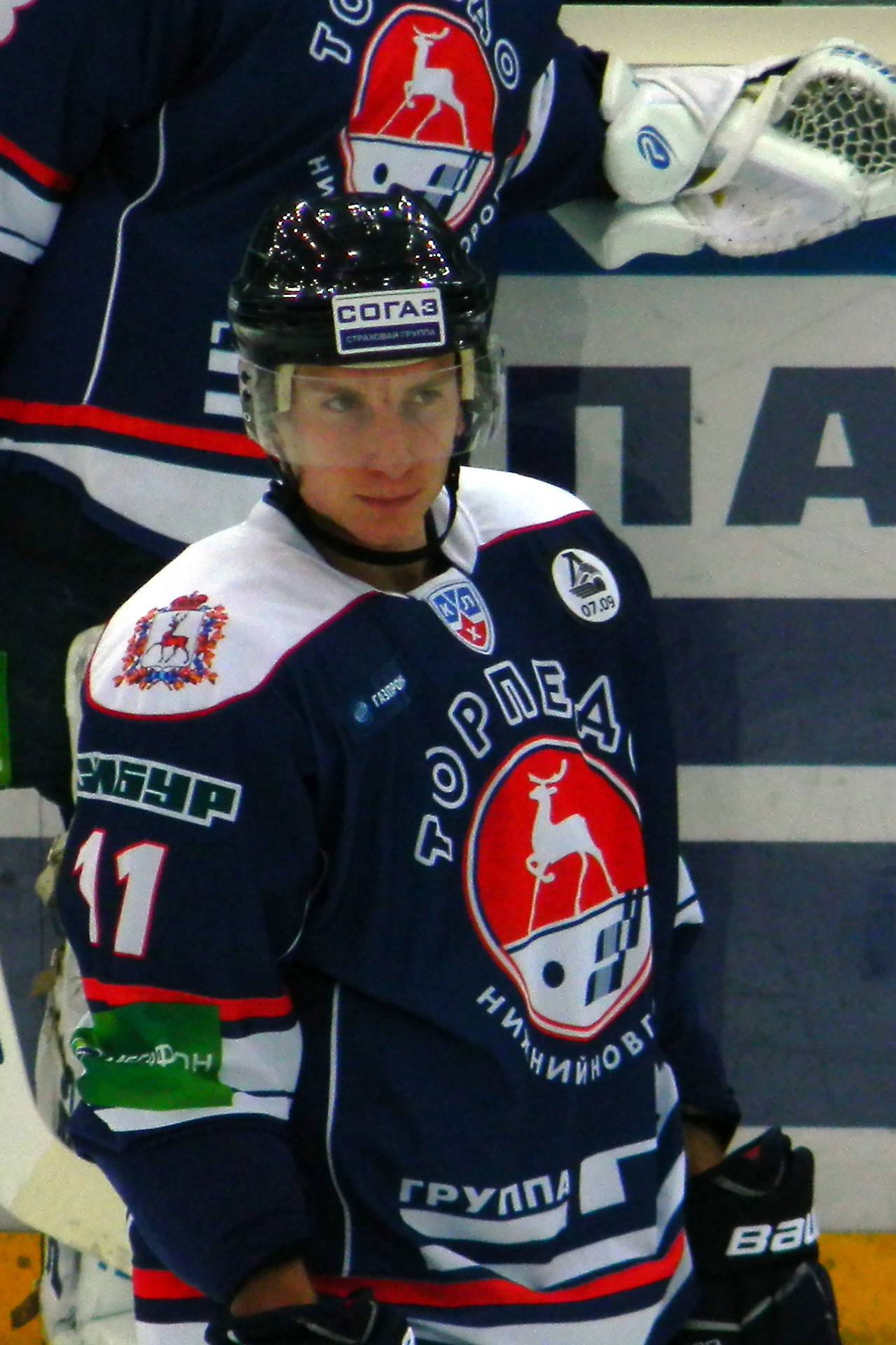
- Hietanen with Torpedo Nizhny Novgorod in 2011
- Born: 14 June 1985 (age 41) Hämeenlinna, Finland
- Height: 5 ft 11 in (180 cm)
- Weight: 187 lb (85 kg; 13 st 5 lb)
- Position: Defence
- Shot: Right
- Liiga team Former teams: HPK; Lahti Pelicans; Brynäs IF; HV71; Torpedo Nizhny Novgorod; Dynamo Moscow; HC Ambrì-Piotta
- National team: Finland
- Playing career: 2003–2025

Juuso Hietanen (born 14 June 1985) is a Finnish professional ice hockey defenceman for HPK of the Liiga.

== Playing career ==
Hietanen made his SM-liiga debut with HPK during the 2003–04 season, and two years later he became a regular player on the team. He also visited Pelicans early in his career and was part of the Finnish national junior team in the 2005 World Junior Ice Hockey Championships. At the time of his SM-liiga debut, he was the first third generation player in the top level of Finnish ice hockey. In 2006 he celebrated the championship with HPK. He scored two goals and an assist in the second final, but HPK suffered its only loss in the series.

In 2007, he moved to Sweden to play in the Elitserien with Brynäs IF and for the 2010–11 season he signed with HV71.

Hietanen played in the Kontinental Hockey League (KHL) from 2011 to 2021, first with Torpedo Nizhny Novgorod and later with Dynamo Moscow.

After 15 seasons abroad, Hietanen opted to return to Finland as a free agent and re-joined their original club, HPK of the Liiga, on an optional three-year contract on 22 April 2022.

== International play ==
Medal record

Representing Finland

Ice hockey

Olympic Games
Gold medal – first place	2022 Beijing	
Bronze medal – third place	2014 Sochi	

World Championships
Gold medal – first place	2022 Finland	
Silver medal – second place	2016 Russia	
Silver medal – second place	2014 Belarus	

Hietanen was selected for the Finnish national team in the 2010 IIHF World Championship.

== Personal life ==
Hietanen's father Juha Hietanen and grandfather Aarno Hietanen also played professional ice hockey.

== Career statistics ==
=== Regular season and playoffs ===
			Regular season					Playoffs
Season	Team	League	GP	G	A	Pts	PIM	GP	G	A	Pts	PIM
2001–02	HPK	FIN U18	28	4	6	10	6	2	0	0	0	0
2002–03	HPK	FIN U18	17	6	7	13	12	2	0	0	0	4
2002–03	HPK	FIN U20	14	0	3	3	10	—	—	—	—	—
2003–04	HPK	FIN U20	41	5	15	20	22	—	—	—	—	—
2003–04	HPK	SM-l	2	0	0	0	0	—	—	—	—	—
2003–04	Suomi U20	Mestis	3	0	0	0	0	—	—	—	—	—
2004–05	HPK	FIN U20	22	10	13	23	20	—	—	—	—	—
2004–05	HPK	SM-l	9	0	1	1	2	—	—	—	—	—
2004–05	Haukat	Mestis	3	0	0	0	0	—	—	—	—	—
2004–05	Pelicans	SM-l	15	0	0	0	4	—	—	—	—	—
2005–06	HPK	FIN U20	5	2	2	4	8	—	—	—	—	—
2005–06	HPK	SM-l	55	2	10	12	30	13	2	1	3	4
2006–07	HPK	SM-l	49	5	16	21	28	9	0	4	4	6
2007–08	Brynäs IF	SEL	54	6	20	26	59	—	—	—	—	—
2008–09	Brynäs IF	SEL	54	3	15	18	44	4	0	1	1	0
2009–10	Brynäs IF	SEL	55	12	17	29	20	5	1	0	1	14
2010–11	HV71	SEL	55	10	23	33	18	4	0	1	1	0
2011–12	Torpedo Nizhny Novgorod	KHL	47	5	25	30	18	13	4	4	8	4
2012–13	Torpedo Nizhny Novgorod	KHL	52	4	19	23	24	—	—	—	—	—
2013–14	Torpedo Nizhny Novgorod	KHL	54	10	22	32	18	7	0	3	3	0
2014–15	Torpedo Nizhny Novgorod	KHL	57	8	19	27	32	5	0	0	0	0
2015–16	Dynamo Moscow	KHL	57	8	8	16	43	10	1	0	1	2
2016–17	Dynamo Moscow	KHL	57	12	18	30	22	9	1	2	3	6
2017–18	Dynamo Moscow	KHL	47	8	12	20	22	—	—	—	—	—
2018–19	Dynamo Moscow	KHL	55	6	13	19	14	11	1	1	2	4
2019–20	Dynamo Moscow	KHL	60	13	25	38	28	6	0	3	3	0
2020–21	Dynamo Moscow	KHL	55	6	20	26	14	10	1	0	1	4
2021–22	HC Ambrì–Piotta	NL	50	2	17	19	12	3	0	1	1	0
2022–23	HPK	Liiga	47	4	14	18	14	—	—	—	—	—
2023–24	HPK	Liiga	54	4	6	10	16	—	—	—	—	—
2024–25	HPK	Liiga	48	0	10	10	10	3	0	0	0	2
Liiga totals			279	15	57	72	104	25	2	5	7	12
SEL totals			218	31	75	106	141	13	1	2	3	14
KHL totals			541	80	181	261	235	71	8	13	21	24

=== International ===
Year	Team	Event	Result	GP	G	A	Pts	PIM
2005	Finland	WJC	5th	6	1	1	2	2
2010	Finland	WC	6th	2	0	0	0	0
2012	Finland	WC	4th	10	1	4	5	0
2013	Finland	WC	4th	10	0	3	3	8
2014	Finland	OG	3rd place, bronze medalist(s)	6	1	0	1	0
2014	Finland	WC	2nd place, silver medalist(s)	10	2	4	6	6
2015	Finland	WC	6th	8	0	0	0	2
2016	Finland	WC	2nd place, silver medalist(s)	10	0	4	4	6
2017	Finland	WC	4th	10	2	1	3	0
2018	Finland	OG	6th	5	1	1	2	4
2022	Finland	OG	1st place, gold medalist(s)	6	0	2	2	4
2022	Finland	WC	1st place, gold medalist(s)	10	1	0	1	0
Senior totals				87	8	19	27	30
