= Ossi Ikonen =

Finnish ice hockey player

- Born: March 4, 1990 (age 35); Toivakka, Finland
- Height: 5 ft 10 in (178 cm)
- Weight: 159 lb (72 kg; 11 st 5 lb)
- Position: Defence
- Shoots: Left
- KAZ team Former teams: Yertis Pavlodar; JYP; Beibarys Atyrau
- NHL draft: Undrafted
- Playing career: 2010–present

Ossi Ikonen (born March 4, 1990) is a Finnish professional ice hockey defenceman. He is currently with Yertis Pavlodar of the Kazakhstan Hockey Championship.

Ikonen made his SM-liiga debut playing with JYP Jyväskylä during the 2011–12 SM-liiga season.
