= HPK =

Finnish ice hockey club

- City: Hämeenlinna
- League: Liiga
- Founded: 1929
- Home arena: Pohjantähti Areena
- Colours: Orange, black, white
- Owner: HPK Liiga Oy
- General manager: Antti Toivanen
- Head coach: Mikko Manner
- Captain: Juuso Hietanen
- Parent club: HPK Edustusjääkiekko ry
- Website: hpk.fi
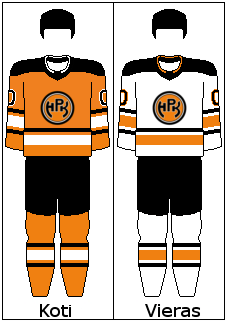

Championships
- Playoff championships: 2006, 2019

Hämeenlinnan Pallokerho (HPK) is a professional ice hockey team in the Liiga, the top men's ice hockey league in Finland. Their home ice is the Ritari-areena in Hämeenlinna. HPK was established in 1929. The parent club of the team is HPK Edustusjääkiekko ry and the team is sometimes promoted as the "Hockey Playing Knights," with a logo representing a knight's helmet. HPK won their first SM-liiga championship in 2006 and the second in 2019.

== Honours ==
=== Champions ===
- (gold) SM-liiga Kanada-malja (2): 2006, 2019

=== Runners-up ===
- (silver) SM-liiga (3): 1952, 1993, 2010
- (bronze) SM-liiga (9): 1954, 1991, 1997, 1999, 2000, 2002, 2003, 2005, 2007

Other awards for the club:

- (gold) I-Divisioona (it was the second level of ice hockey in Finland) (5): 1980, 1981, 1982, 1983, 1988

== Players ==
=== Current roster ===
No.	Nat	Player	Pos	S/G	Age	Acquired	Birthplace
81	(Finland)	Samuli Aaltonen	LW	L	25	2023	Uusikaupunki, Finland
8	(Finland)	Vili Alitalo	C	L	23	2023	Hämeenlinna, Finland
72	(Latvia)	Arturs Andzans	D	L	24	2023	Riga, Latvia
93	(Sweden)	Christopher Bengtsson	C	L	32	2024	Stockholm, Sweden
–	(Finland)	Olli Eloranta	C	L	19	2024	Lahti, Finland
17	(Finland)	Juuso Hietanen (A)	D	R	40	2022	Hämeenlinna, Finland
25	(Finland)	Heikki Huttunen	C	R	27	2022	Helsinki, Finland
37	(Finland)	Ossi Ikonen	D	L	36	2019	Toivakka, Finland
11	(Finland)	Julius Janhonen	C	L	27	2024	Espoo, Finland
71	(Finland)	Juho Järvelä	C	L	22	2023	Mikkeli, Finland
4	(Finland)	Viljami Jokirinne	D	L	22	2024	Nokia, Finland
3	(Finland)	Kalle Kangas	D	L	21	2024	Vantaa, Finland
89	(Finland)	Juuso Ketola	D	R	25	2023	Ulvila, Finland
–	(Finland)	Akseli Ketonen	D	R	20	2024	Hämeenlinna, Finland
23	(Finland)	Jesse Kiiskinen	RW	R	20	2024	Hollola, Finland
44	(Finland)	Oliver Kopiloff	C/LW	L	20	2024	Hämeenlinna, Finland
15	(Finland)	Olli Korhonen	C	L	27	2024	Anjalankoski, Finland
43	(Finland)	Miska Kukkonen	D	R	25	2024	Jokioinen, Finland
80	(Finland)	Kasper Lundell	C	L	22	2023	Espoo, Finland
74	(Finland)	Petteri Nikkilä (C)	D	L	33	2022	Hämeenlinna, Finland
40	(Finland)	Petteri Nurmi	D	L	24	2021	Helsinki, Finland
12	(Finland)	Sami Päivärinta	C	L	22	2023	Somero, Finland
30	(Finland)	Sami Rajaniemi	G	L	33	2022	Oulainen, Finland
19	(Finland)	Teemu Rautiainen	LW	L	33	2023	Nurmijärvi, Finland
29	(Finland)	Miro Ruokonen	LW	L	29	2023	Forssa, Finland
35	(Finland)	Kaj Saarinen	G	L	21	2022	Hämeenlinna, Finland
1	(Finland)	Kim Saarinen	G	L	19	2023	Hämeenlinna, Finland
18	(Finland)	Valtteri Savolainen	LW	L	22	2022	Hämeenlinna, Finland
28	(Finland)	Aleksi Sinkkonen	LW	L	23	2024	Imatra, Finland
50	(Finland)	Axel Skinnari	W	R	21	2023	Lahti, Finland
92	(Finland)	Vili Toivonen	RW	L	20	2022	Loppi, Finland
82	(Finland)	Eetu Tuulola (A)	RW	R	27	2023	Hämeenlinna, Finland
10	(Finland)	Roope Vesterinen	W	L	20	2022	Hämeenlinna, Finland
38	(Finland)	Eerik Wallenius	D	L	20	2023	Salo, Finland

Updated August 1, 2024

=== Honored members ===
- 2 Eero Salisma
- 9 Jyrki Louhi
- 13 Marko Palo
- 17 Juha Hietanen
- 18 Hannu Savolainen
- 36 Marko Tuulola

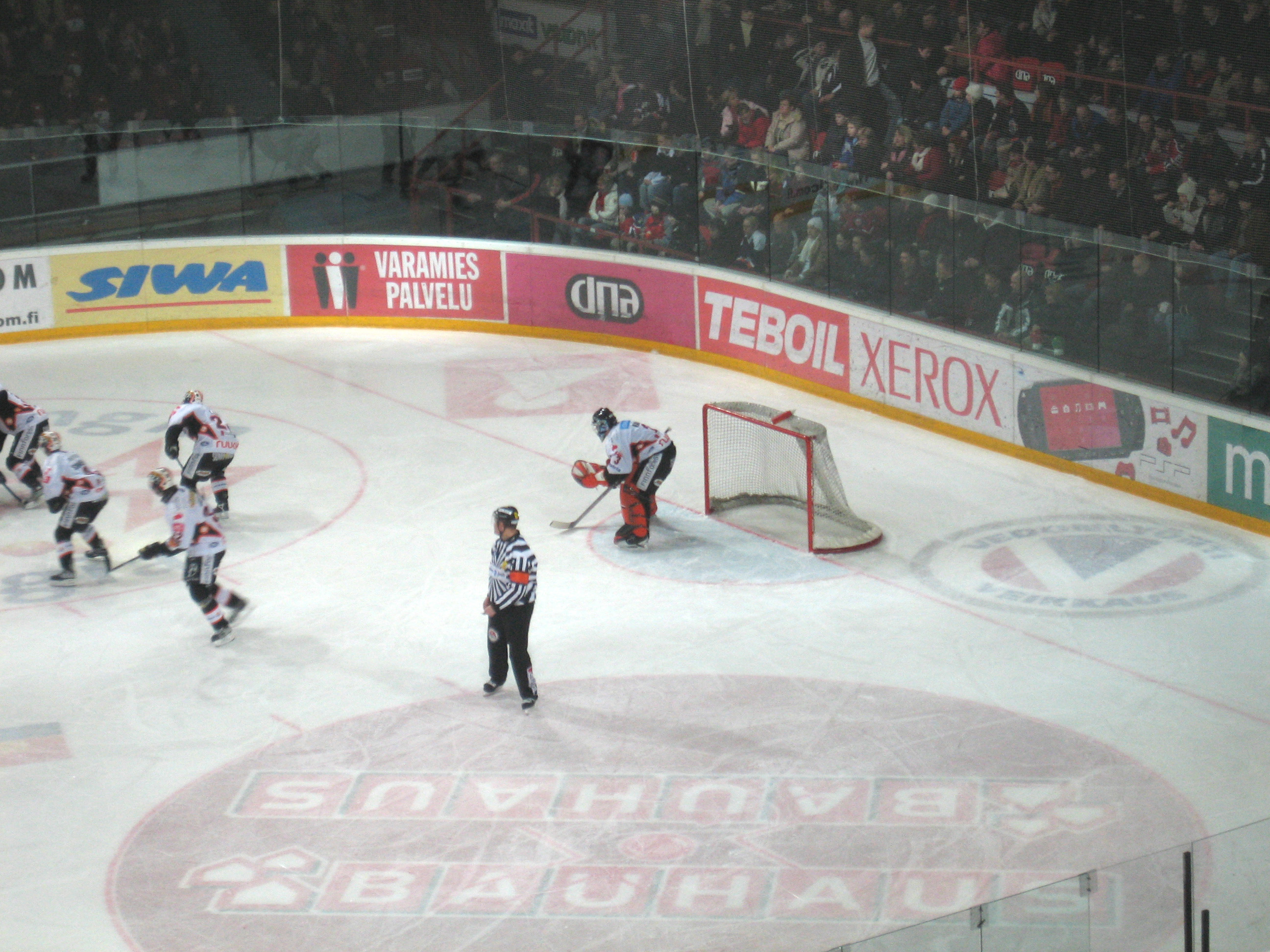
Karri Rämö shared the netminding duties with Miika Wiikman during the 2005–06 season. Image from the match vs. HIFK, January 2006.

=== NHL alumni ===
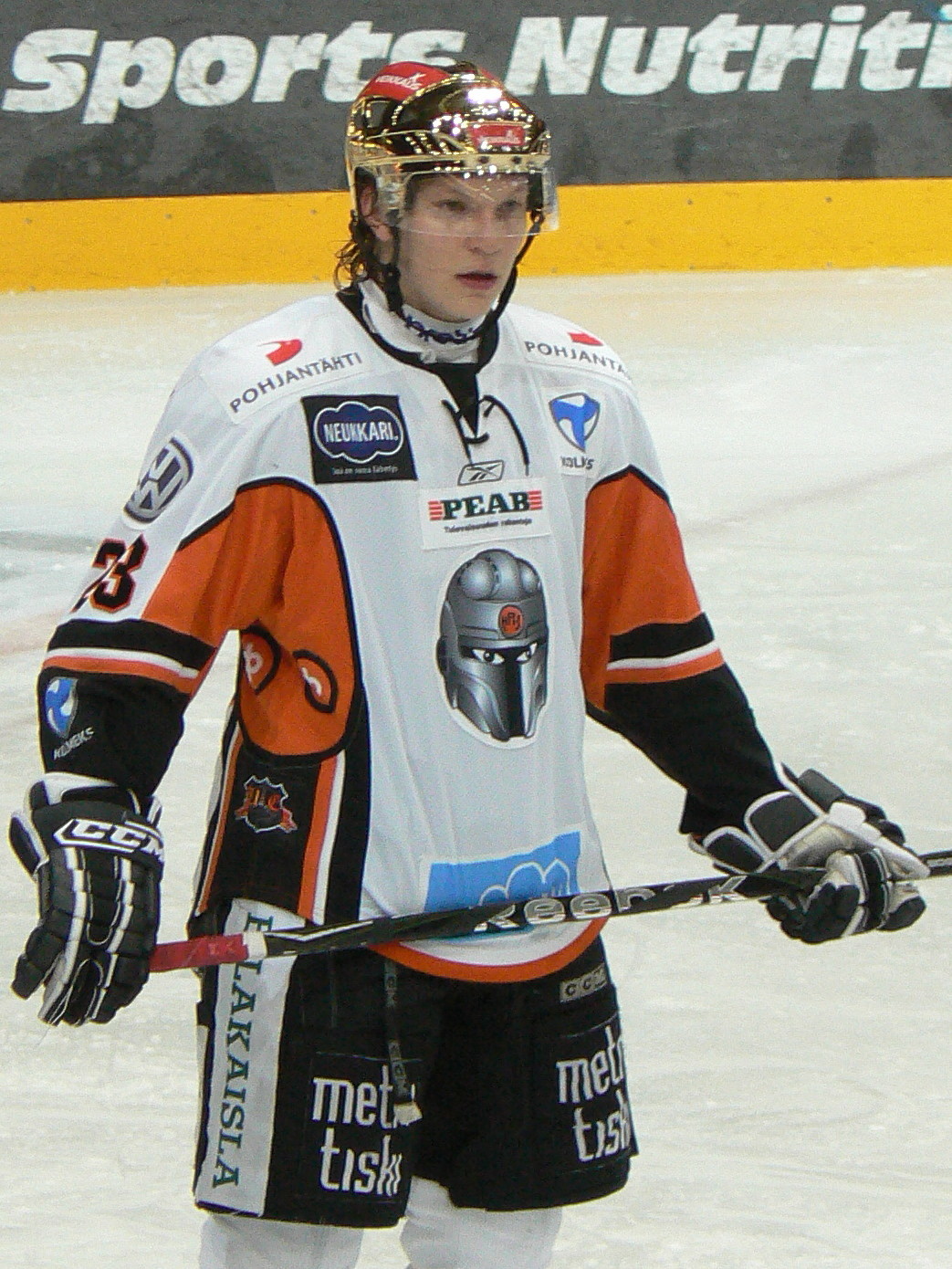
Joonas Kemppainen playing for HPK in October 2009

- (Canada) Eric Fehr
- (Finland) Riku Hahl
- (Finland) Jukka Hentunen
- (Canada) Josh Holden
- (Finland) Niko Kapanen
- (Czech Republic) Rostislav Klesla
- (Finland) Janne Laukkanen
- (Finland) Ville Leino
- (Finland) Antti Miettinen
- (Finland) Pasi Nurminen
- (Finland) Timo Pärssinen
- (Finland) Antti Pihlström
- (United States) Brian Rafalski
- (Finland) Karri Rämö
- (Canada) Geoff Sanderson
- (Czech Republic) Roman Šimíček
- (Finland) Ville Sirén
- (Finland) Juuse Saros
- (Czech Republic) Petr Tenkrát
- (Finland) Hannu Toivonen
- (Finland) Jarkko Varvio
- (Czech Republic) Tomáš Vlasák
- (Finland) Kristian Vesalainen

== See also ==
- HPK Kiekkonaiset
- Ice hockey in Finland
