= Palmroth =

== Origin ==
The Palmroth surname originated in the 1600s in Arboga, Sweden, with Jon Jonsson, the town's mayor, who adopted the name Palmgren for his children. His daughter Elisabeth Palmgren married Nils Svensson, a trader and city councillor. Their children took the name Palmroth, likely due to the maternal line lacking male heirs and the family's growing distinction.

Of their sons Anders became head librarian at Uppsala University, Johan Palmroth a professor of theology and Petter a royal church auditor in Stockholm, under gouvernor Gyllenstierna, overseeing parish finances.

Petter married Elsa Tiesen, of German or Dutch origin. Their children included: Petter Jr., a royal court secretary and Carl, who joined the army young, served in the Great Northern War, and settled in Ruovesi, Finland as a nimismies (police chief/local administrator). His son and grandson continued in this role.

The Palmroth name spread in Finland, partly through descendants, Petter Palmroths grandson Johan Palmroth also ended up in Finland after joining the Swedish Army, but also by locals adopting it from local Swedish officials like Carl and Johan Palmroth.

== Geographical distribution ==
Palmroth is a Swedish-language surname, more common in Finland than in Sweden.

As of 2014, 57.5% of all known bearers of the surname Palmroth were residents of Finland (frequency 1:20,743), 25.2% of Sweden (1:84,886), 8.9% of Germany (1:1,956,796), 6.3% of the United States (1:12,456,941) and 1.7% of Estonia (1:165,209).

In Finland, the frequency of the surname was higher than national average (1:20,743) in the following regions:

1. Pirkanmaa (1:5,958)
2. Southwest Finland (1:8,961)
3. South Ostrobothnia (1:11,522)
4. Ostrobothnia (1:12,414)
5. Satakunta (1:15,246)

In Sweden, the frequency of the surname was higher than national average (1:84,886) in the following counties:

1. Södermanland County (1:23,268)
2. Örebro County (1:28,520)
3. Västmanland County (1:28,819)
4. Stockholm County (1:40,793)
5. Jämtland County (1:42,753)
6. Uppsala County (1:69,953)

== People ==
- Johan Palmroth (1650–1727), Swedish academic
- Pehr W. Palmroth (1765–1825), Swedish architect
- Pertti Palmroth (1931–2020), Finnish footwear designer
- Tero Palmroth (born 1953), Finnish driver in the CART Championship Car series
- Minna Palmroth, professor in computational space physics at the University of Helsinki
- Markus Palmroth (born 1989), Finnish ice hockey defenceman
