= Vissefjärda =

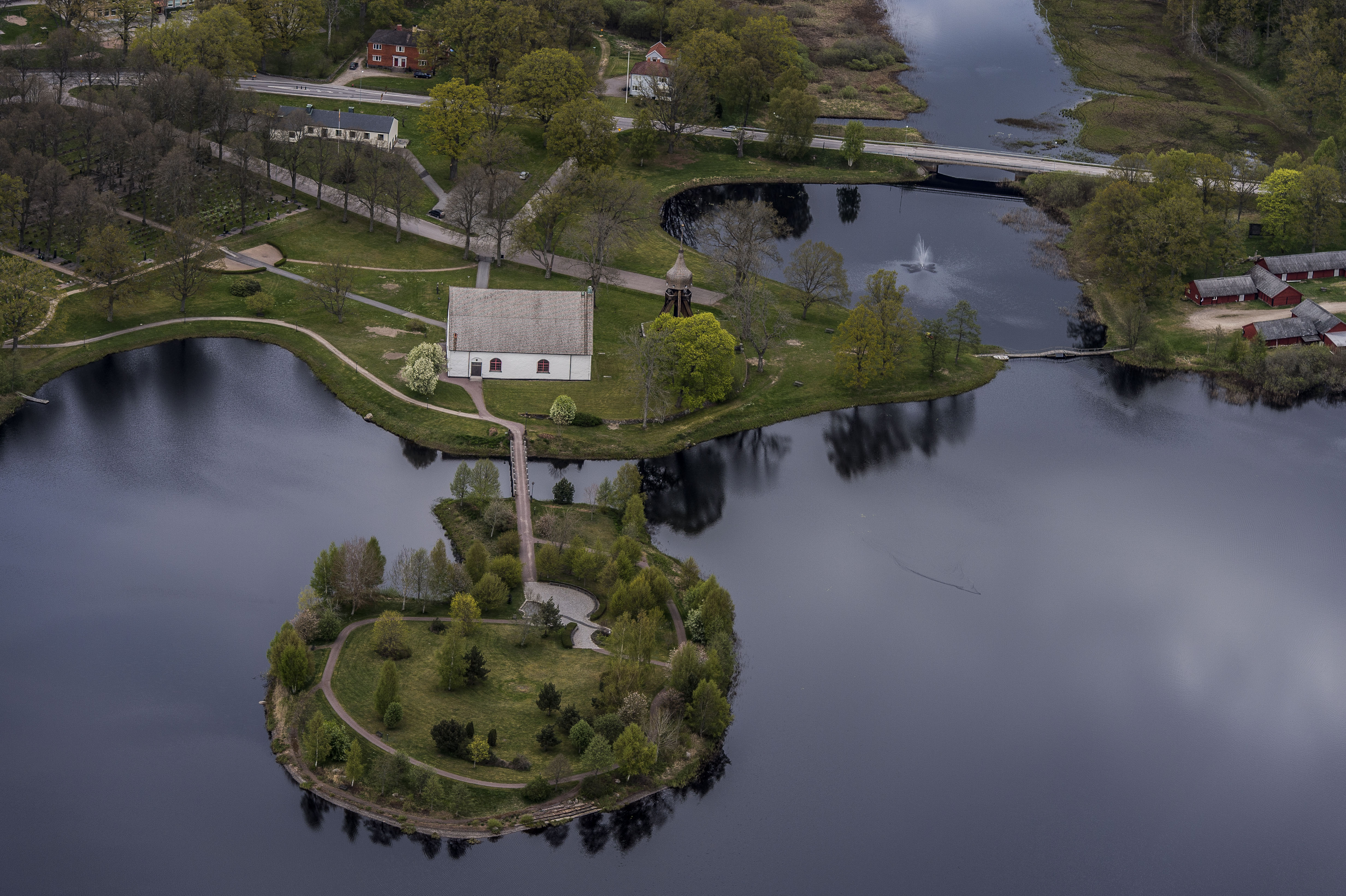
- Vissefjärda Church and Memorial Park

- Location within Kalmar Location within Sweden
- Coordinates: 56°32′13″N 15°35′00″E
- Country: Sweden
- Province: Småland
- County: Kalmar County
- Municipality: Emmaboda Municipality

Area
  - Total: 1.15 km^{2} (0.44 sq mi)

Population (31 December 2010)
  - Total: 670
  - Density: 584/km^{2} (1,510/sq mi)
- Time zone: UTC+1 (CET)
  - Summer (DST): UTC+2 (CEST)

Vissefjärda is a locality situated in Emmaboda Municipality, Kalmar County, Sweden. Vissefjärda is also the name of the parish.

== Vissefjärda Church ==
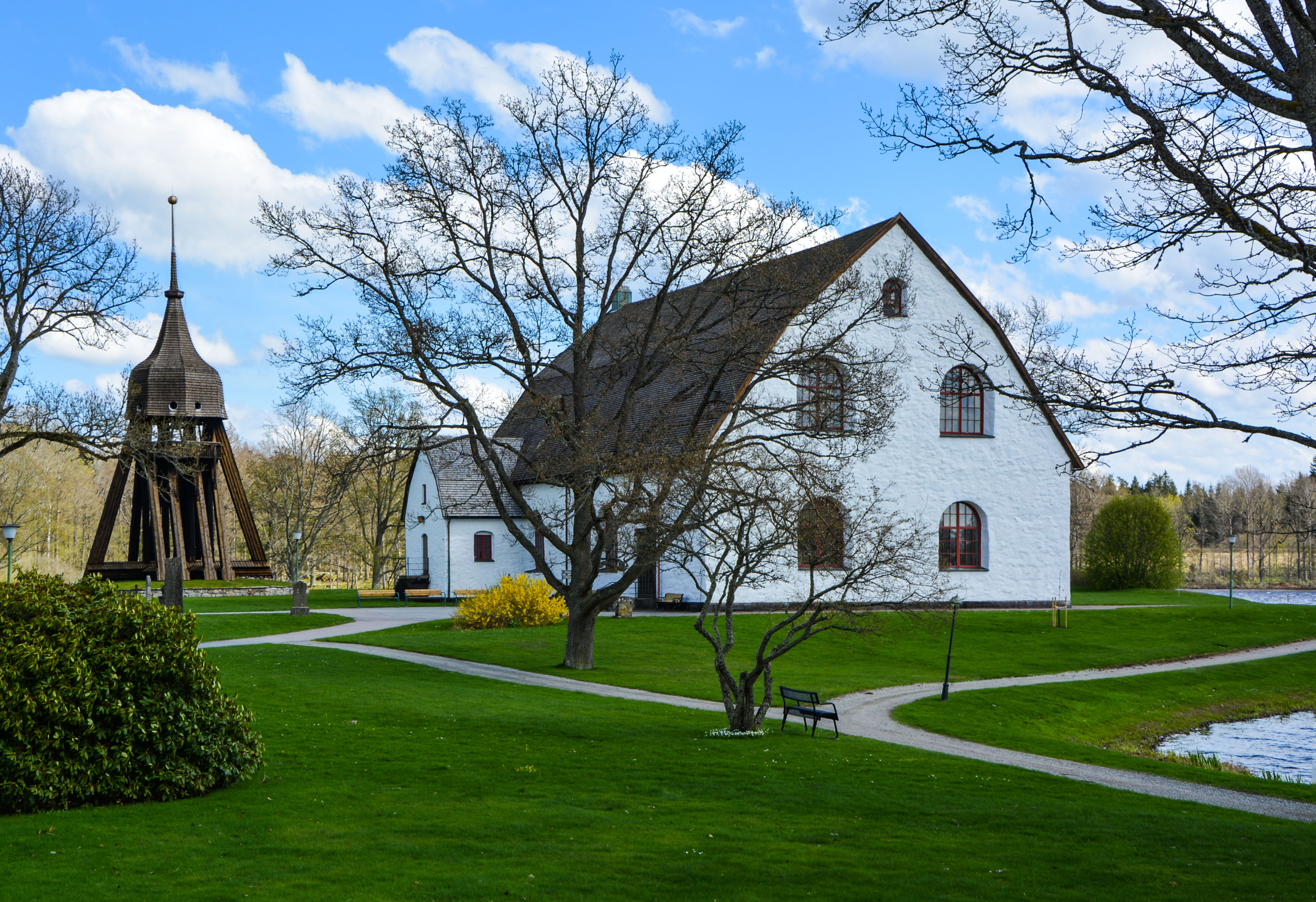
Vissefjärda Church

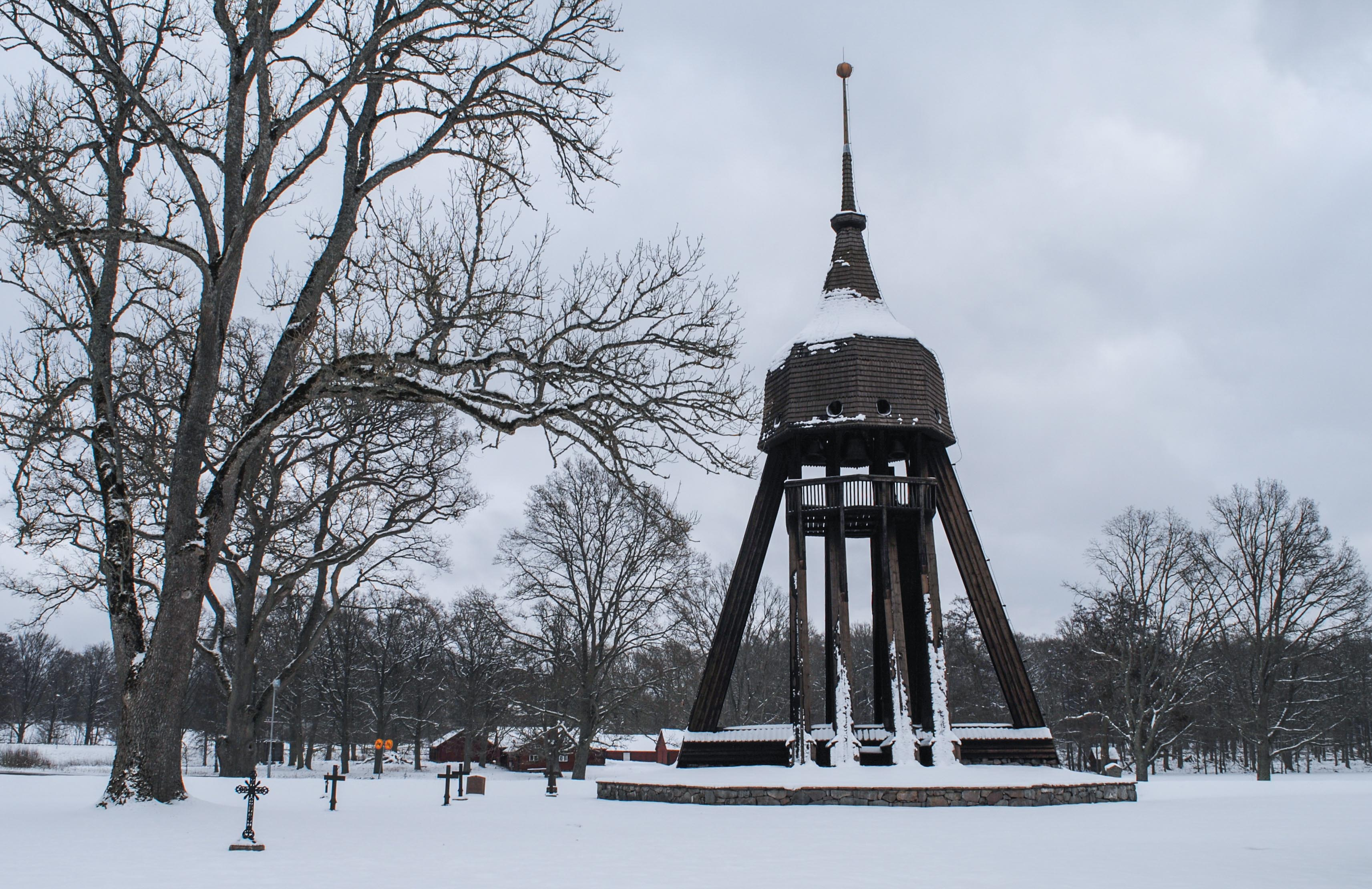
Vissefjärda Bell Tower

Vissefjärda Church (Vissefjärda kyrka) dates to 28 February 1773. It is associated with the parish of Emmaboda in the Diocese of Växjö. The stone church stands where the Lyckebyån River runs into lake Kyrksjön. The chandeliers are of varying age with the oldest dating to 1691. The altarpiece was painted by Pehr Hörberg in 1795. The pulpit is from 1842. The organ is acquired from Kalmar Cathedral in 1883. The wooden church bell tower was erected in 1774.

On an island opposite the church lies church memorial park (Minneslunden). Opposite the church, on the other side of the Lyckebyån, are church stables for some 200 horses. These were built in 1855 and in use until the late 1930s. The old county road ran along the stables and then crossed the river via an arched bridge, which was demolished in 1937. Since 1948 the stables accommodate a local museum with old tools and household items from the area, and it is the location for Midsummer festivities.

== Historical Society ==
Vissefjarda Local History Society (Vissefjärda Hembygdsförening) was formed on 18 April 1937. Since 1950, the association has published an annual review, I Dackebygd. Besides the church stables and the historic Kyrkeby Distillery (Kyrkeby Bränneri) which from the 1770s, the association also takes care of some older houses and cottages in the parish.

== Population and area ==
Vissefjärda's municipality is 115 ha. Its population varied only slightly since 1960.

- 1960: 623
- 1965: 688
- 1970: 736
- 1975: 770
- 1980: 757
- 1990: 746
- 1995: 714
- 2000: 695
- 2005: 673
- 2010: 670

Migrants from Vissefjärda in the twentieth century to the United States ended up in Illinois and Kansas.

== Other services ==
Vissefjärda has a primary school of about 100 students. Extensive renovations in 2008 included the addition of a library. There is a kindergarten, Panther, with about 50 children, and a preschool, Lillgården, for children up to five years.

The Emmaboda golf club owns a golf course with 18 holes, Björketorp, at Kyrksjön. The local sports club, VGIF, was established in 1929, and has football, table tennis, gymnastics, and tennis.

== Notable residents ==
- Nils Dacke (1510-1543), leader of a mid-16th century peasant revolt in Småland and popular upraising against King Gustav Vasa.
- Jon Jonsson (1582−1663), mayor of Arboga, Sweden
- Lars Gullin (1928-1976), jazz musician and saxophonist
- Theodor Wisén (1835-1892), Rector of Lund University, scholar of Old Norse and other Scandinavian languages

== Gallery ==
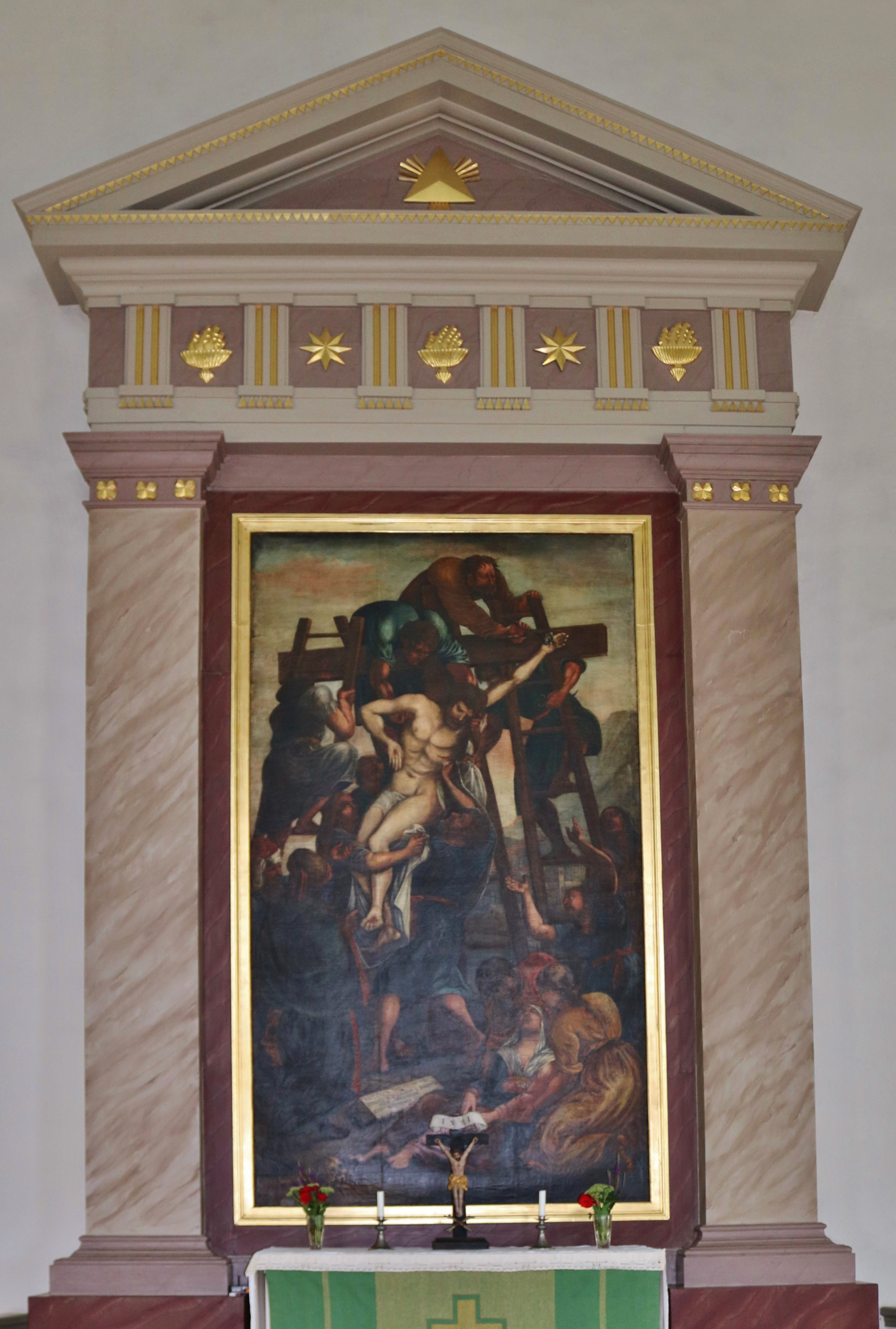
Altarpiece

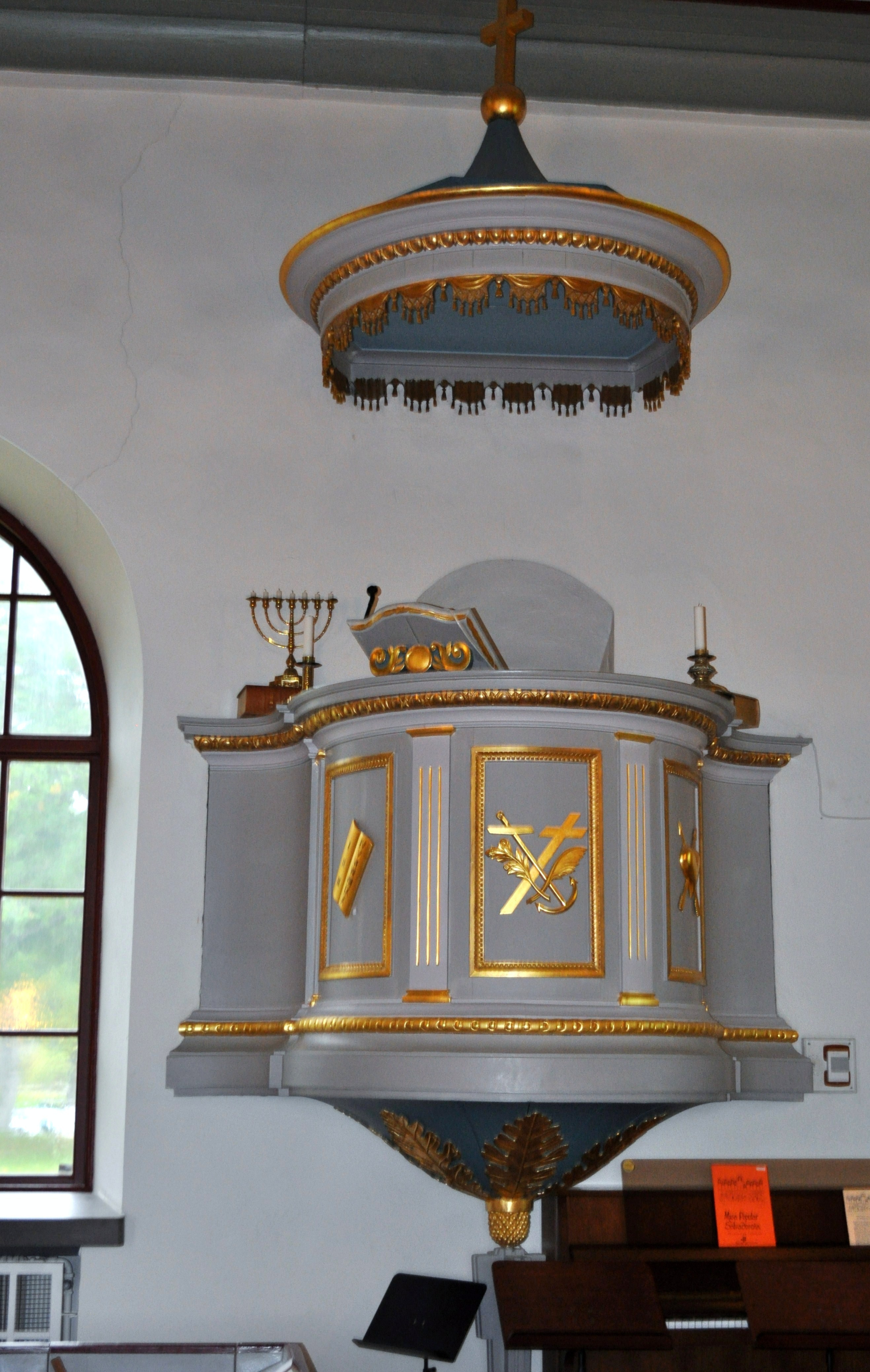
Pulpit

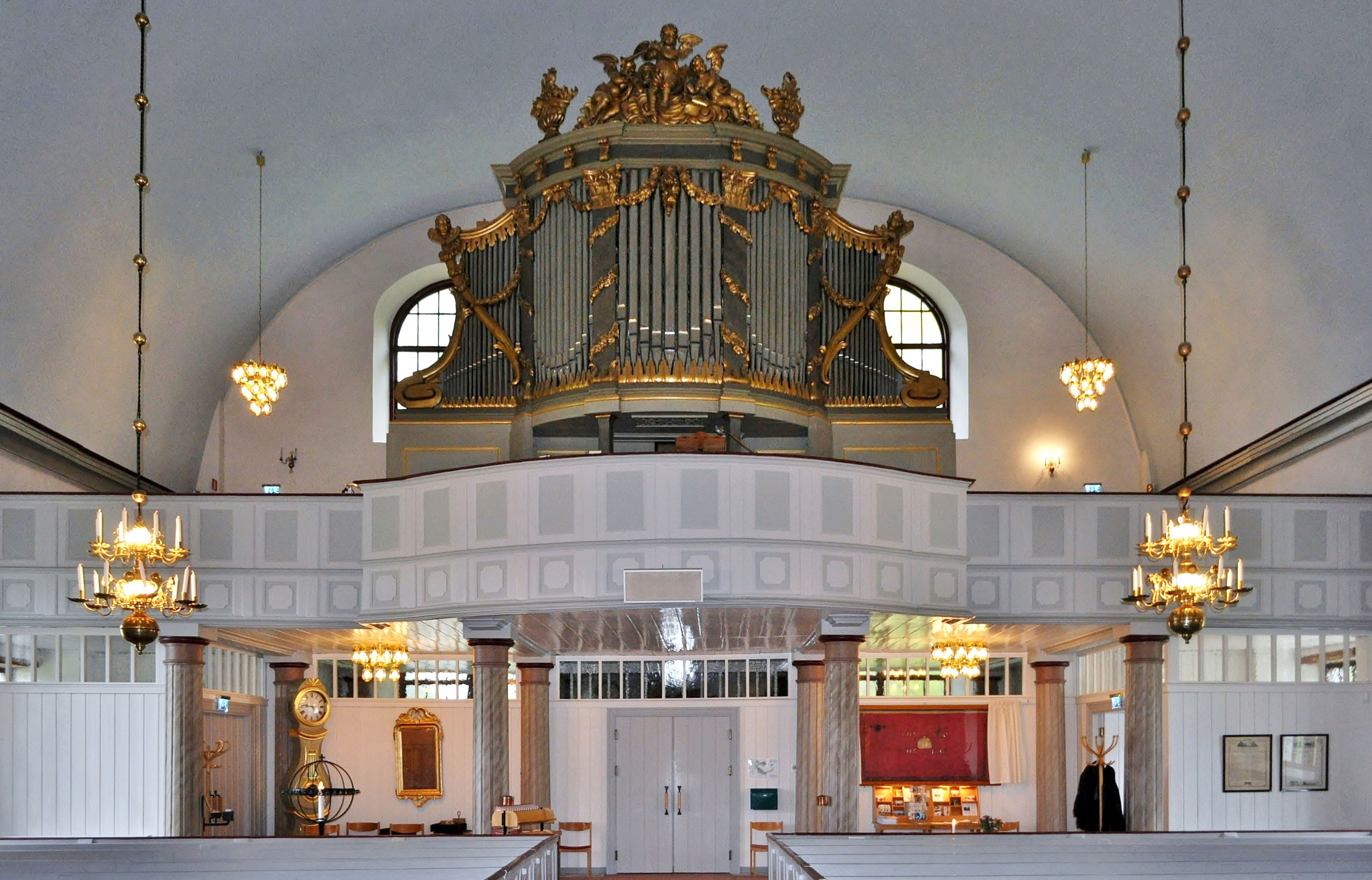
Sanctuary

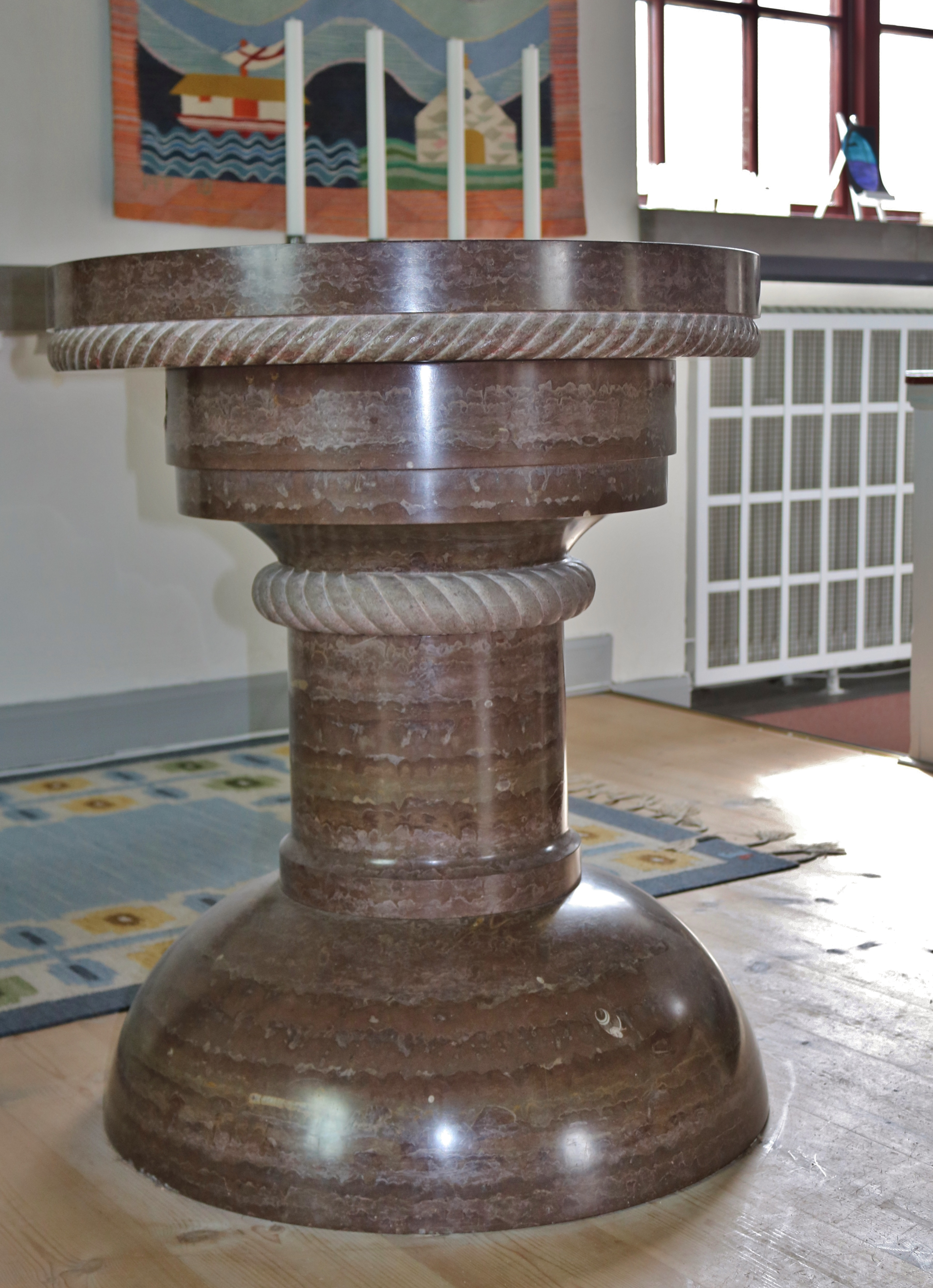
Baptismal Font

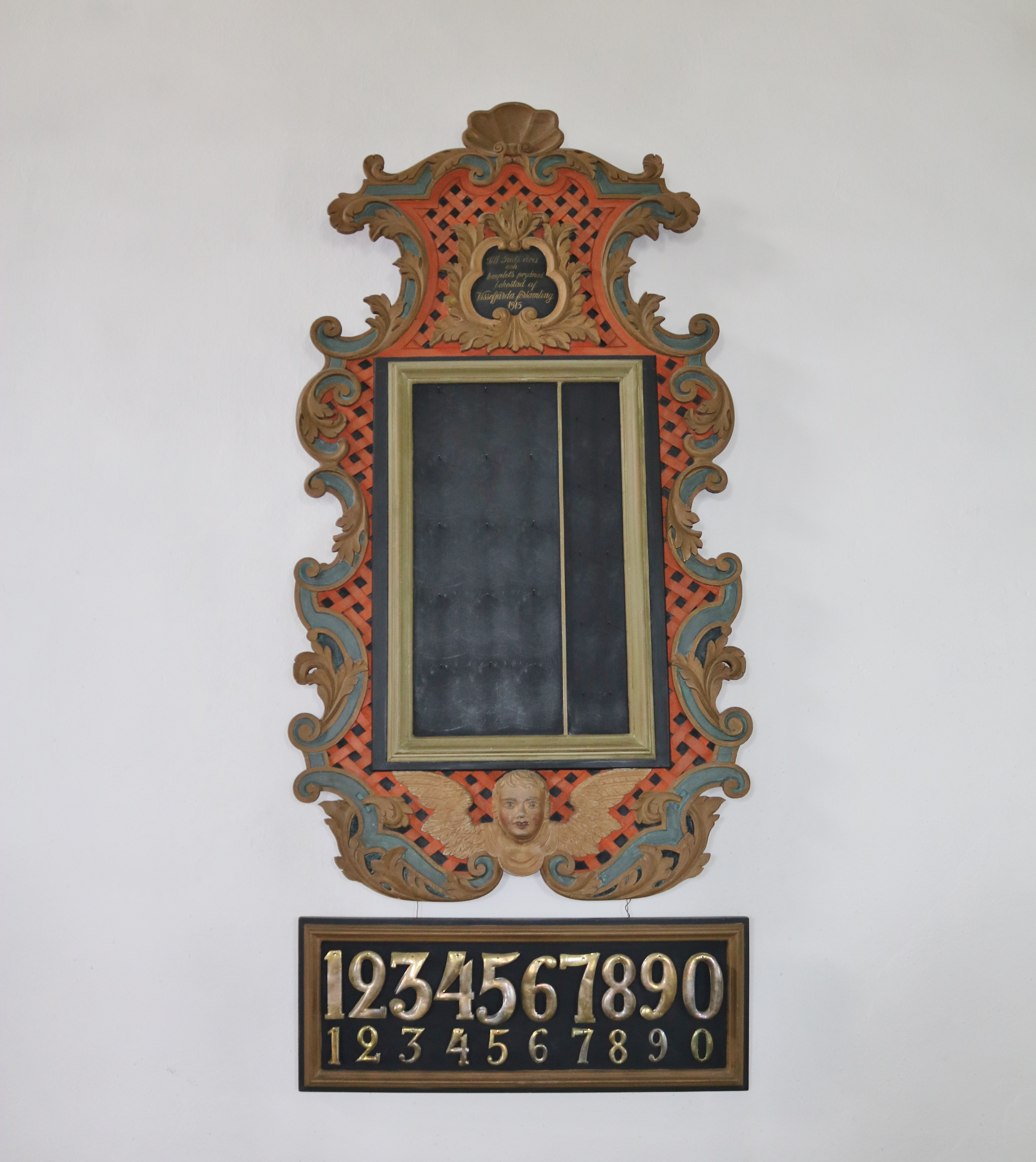
Church Hymnboard

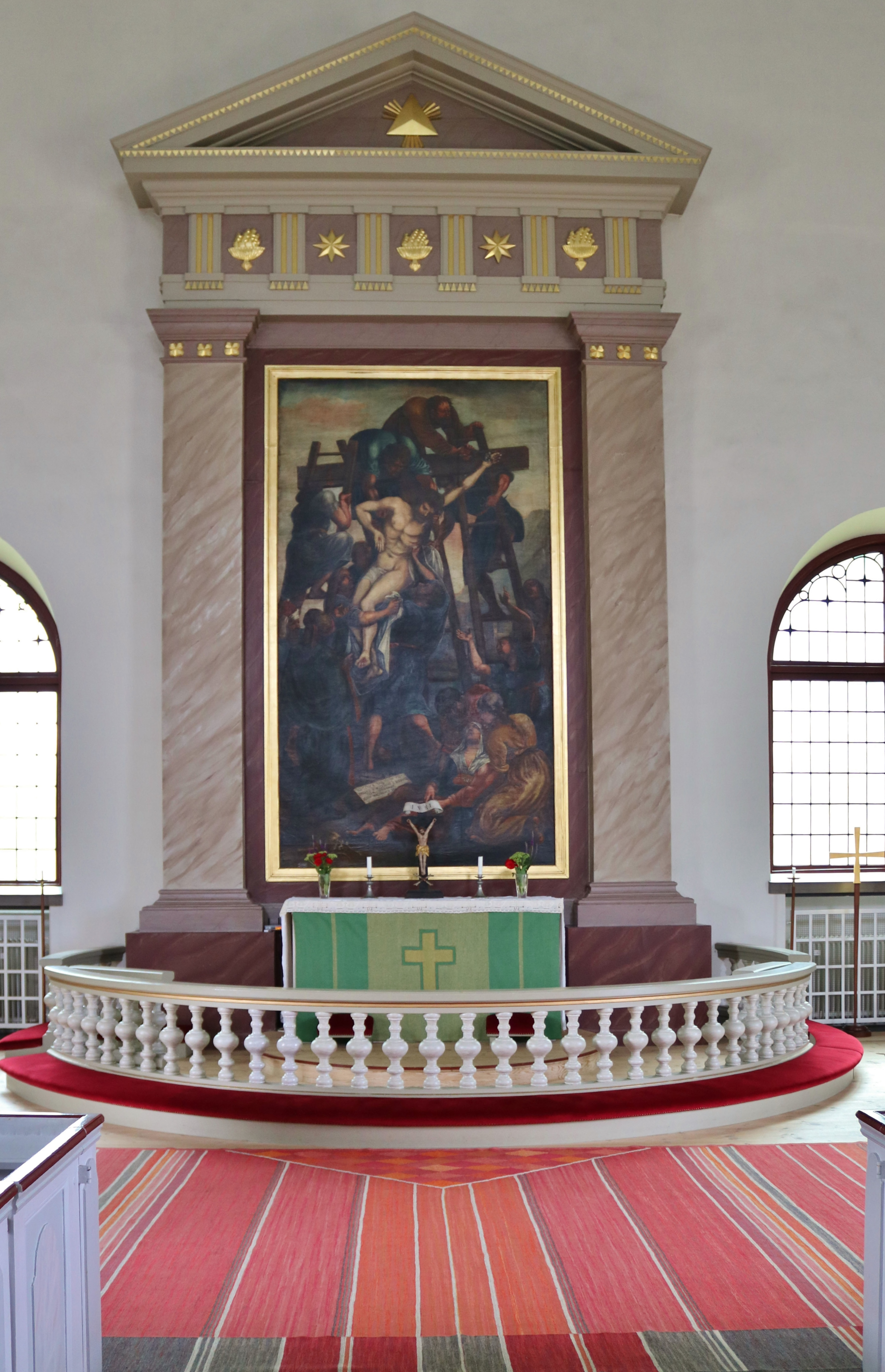
Altar
