= Jarno Laitinen =

Finnish ice hockey player (born 1988)

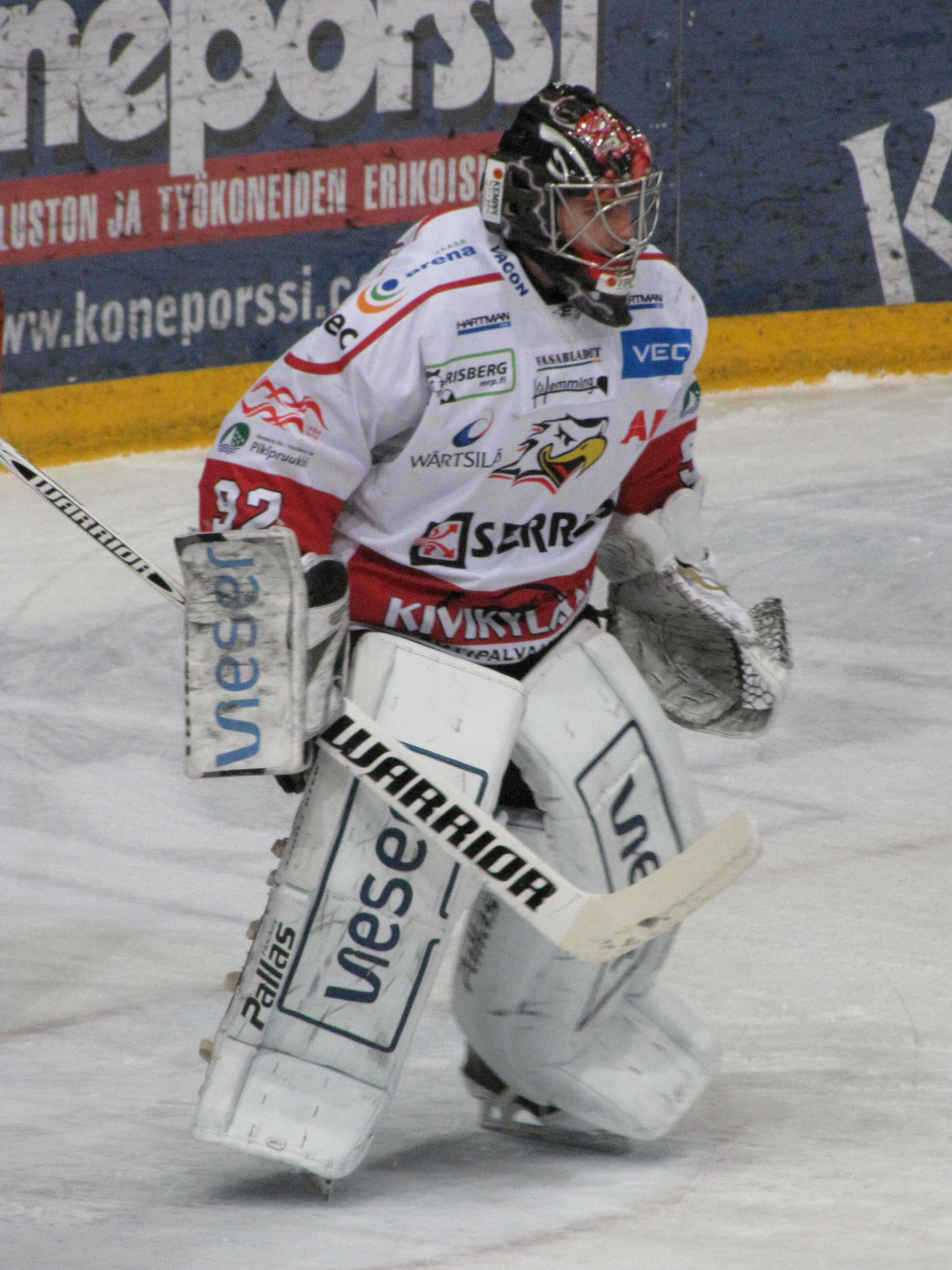
Image of Finnish ice hockey goaltender Jarno Laitinen playing for Vaasa Sport in a Finnish SM-liiga relegation game in March, 2012.

Jarno Laitinen (born 27 March 1988 in Pirkkala) is a Finnish ice hockey goaltender. He currently plays for JYP in the SM-liiga.
