= Pirkkala =

Pirkkala Birkala
- Municipality
- Pirkkalan kunta Birkala kommun
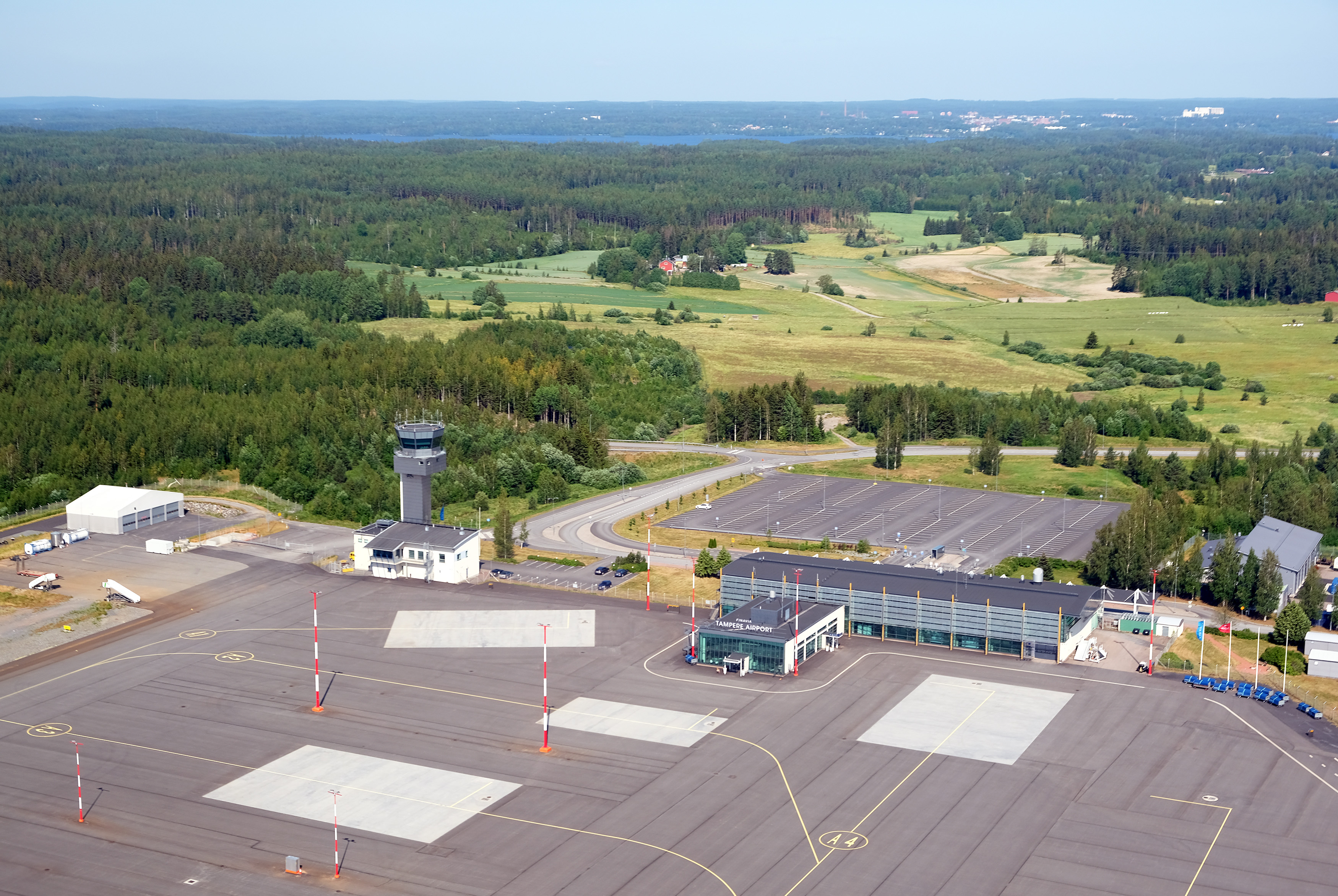
- Tampere-Pirkkala Airport

- Coat of arms

- Location of Pirkkala in Finland
- Interactive map of Pirkkala
- Coordinates: 61°28′N 023°39′E
- Country: Finland
- Region: Pirkanmaa
- Sub-region: Tampere
- Metropolitan area: Tampere
- Charter: 1922
- Seat: Naistenmatka

Government
  - Mayor: Marko Jarva

Area (2018-01-01)
  - Total: 104.04 km^{2} (40.17 sq mi)
  - Land: 81.42 km^{2} (31.44 sq mi)
  - Water: 22.66 km^{2} (8.75 sq mi)
  - Rank: 304th largest in Finland

Population (2025-12-31)
  - Total: 21,373
  - Rank: 48th largest in Finland
  - Density: 262.5/km^{2} (680/sq mi)

Population by native language
  - Finnish: 94.8% (official)
  - Swedish: 0.4%
  - Others: 4.8%

Population by age
  - 0 to 14: 19.9%
  - 15 to 64: 61.8%
  - 65 or older: 18.3%
- Time zone: UTC+02:00 (EET)
  - Summer (DST): UTC+03:00 (EEST)
- Website: www.pirkkala.fi/en/

Pirkkala (Finnish: [ˈpirkːɑlɑ]; Swedish: Birkala) is a municipality in Finland, located in the Pirkanmaa region. It lies to the southwest of the regional capital, Tampere. The population of Pirkkala is approximately 21,000, while the metropolitan area has a population of approximately 428,000. It is the 48th most populous municipality in Finland.

Pirkkala has an area of 104.04 square kilometres (40.17 sq mi) of which 22.66 km^{2} (8.75 sq mi) is water. The population density is 262.5 inhabitants per square kilometre (680/sq mi), which makes it the most densely populated municipality in Finland that does not use the title of town or city. Pirkkala is also currently the fastest-growing municipality in the Pirkanmaa region. The municipality is unilingually Finnish.

Tampere-Pirkkala Airport is located in southwest Pirkkala. The most significant main road in Pirkkala is Tampere Ring Road.

== History ==
=== Great Pirkkala ===
The former parish of Suur-Pirkkala (Great Pirkkala) is mentioned in historical writings from the 14th century. It occupied over half of Pirkanmaa, a region nowadays populated by about 526,000 inhabitants. Suur-Pirkkala began to split when new parishes and municipalities were founded and wanted independence.

=== South and North Pirkkala ===
In 1922 the Pirkkala was split into Pohjois- (Northern) and Etelä-Pirkkala (Southern Pirkkala) due to a movement in Southern Pirkkala led by agronomist Hannes Palmroth of the Partola Estate to gain independence from the more industrial North.

=== Pirkkala ===
In 1938 the name of Northern Pirkkala was changed to Nokia and after an appeal to the President of Finland Kyösti Kallio in 1939, Southern Pirkkala reverted to its original name Pirkkala. The present-day province of Pirkanmaa that was founded in the 1950s is named after Pirkkala as it was in the center of the region that was more or less the same area as the historic Great Pirkkala

== Sights ==
Pirkkala has been inhabited by the Stone Age and Iron Age, and many ancient finds have been made in the area.

The red-brick old church was designed by Ilmari Launis in 1921, and it is known that it was built on the site of the old Pirkkala parish church. The white new church from 1994, designed by Simo Paavilainen and Käpy Paavilainen, is located near the current town center, Naistenmatka. In its year of completion, the church, which has a modern appearance, was chosen as the most beautiful new building in Finland.

The Sculpture Park has been formed near the municipal center from the works of art of the international cast iron symposia of 2001 and 2003. It consists of sculptures of contemporary art, which are mostly placed around Lake Vähäjärvi. The idea of the cast iron symposiums is Villu Jaanisoo, an artist from Pirkkala who moved from Estonia to Finland. Other materials were used in the 2003 event. Perhaps the most prominent of the sights is the Jaaniso's Peruspirkkalalainen statue on the edge of the Suupantori market square in the town center, or the Valte statue according to its model.

== Demographics ==
Population size 1990–2025
Year	Population
1990	11,409
1995	11,723
2000	12,736
2005	14,875
2010	17,237
2015	18,913
2020	19,803
2025	21,373

== Notable people ==
- Minna Craucher (1891–1932), socialite and spy
- Lauri Ala-Myllymäki (born 1997), football player
- Tuija Brax (born 1965), politician and former Minister of Justice
- Jan-Mikael Järvinen (born 1988), ice hockey player
- Jarno Laitinen (born 1988), ice hockey player
- Joonas Lehtivuori (born 1988), ice hockey player
- Mika Mäki (born 1988), racing driver
- Reijo Mikkolainen (born 1964), ice hockey player
- Pertti Palmroth (born 1931), shoe designer
- Pasi Petriläinen (born 1978), ice hockey player
- Riikka Purra (born 1977), politician
- Lauri Pyykönen (born 1978), cross-country skier
- Jukka Tammi (born 1962), ice hockey player
- Artturi Tienari (1907–1998), Civil Guard officer, business executive and politician
- Allu Tuppurainen (born 1951), actor and screenwriter
- Jouko Turkka (1942–2016), theatrical director and controversialist
- Sanna Marin (born 1985), Finnish Prime Minister

== International relations ==
=== Twin towns — Sister cities ===
Pirkkala is twinned with:

- Solna, Sweden

== Gallery ==
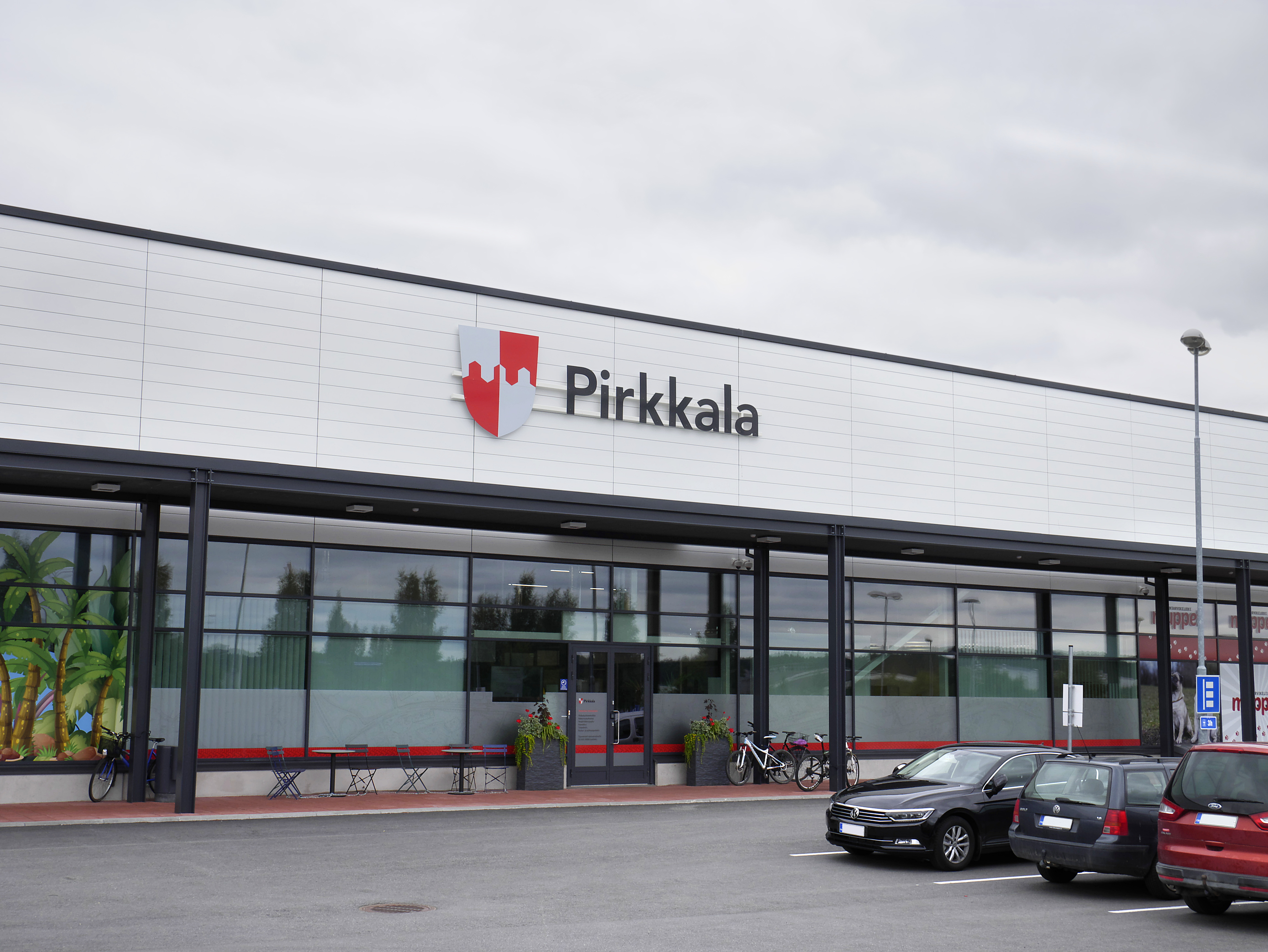
Pirkkala Municipal Ofiice

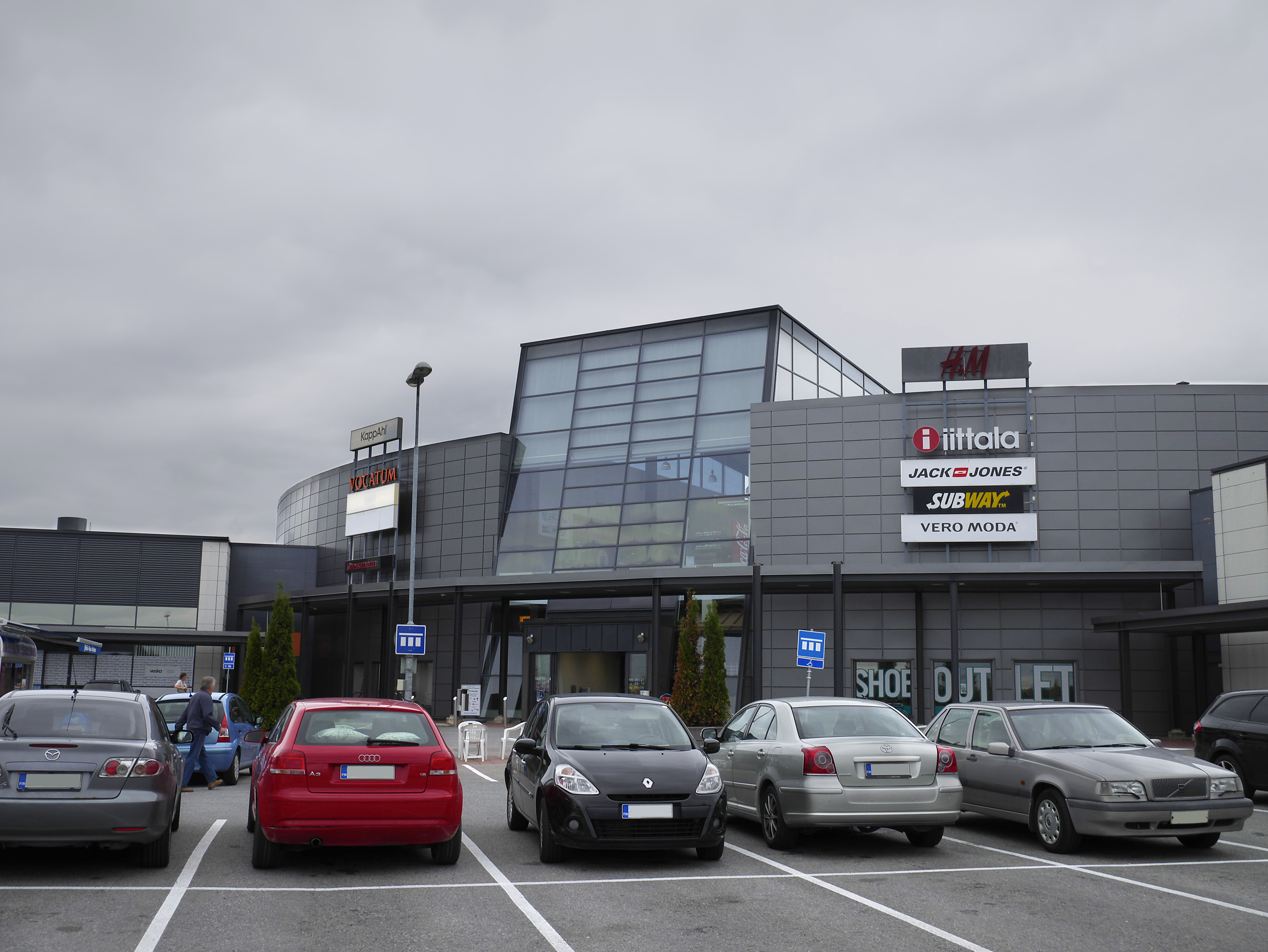
Veska Shopping Centre

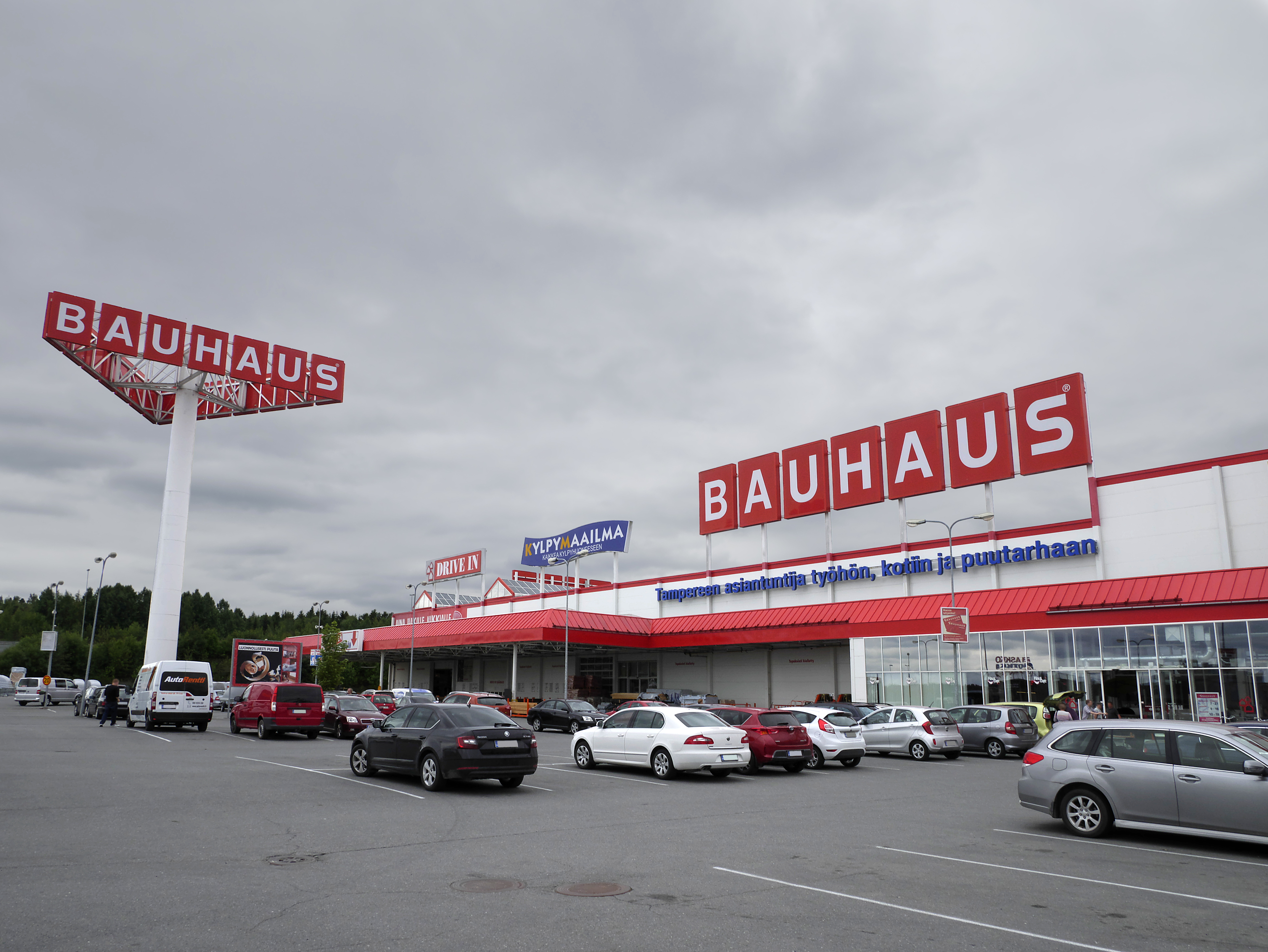
Bauhaus store in Pirkkala

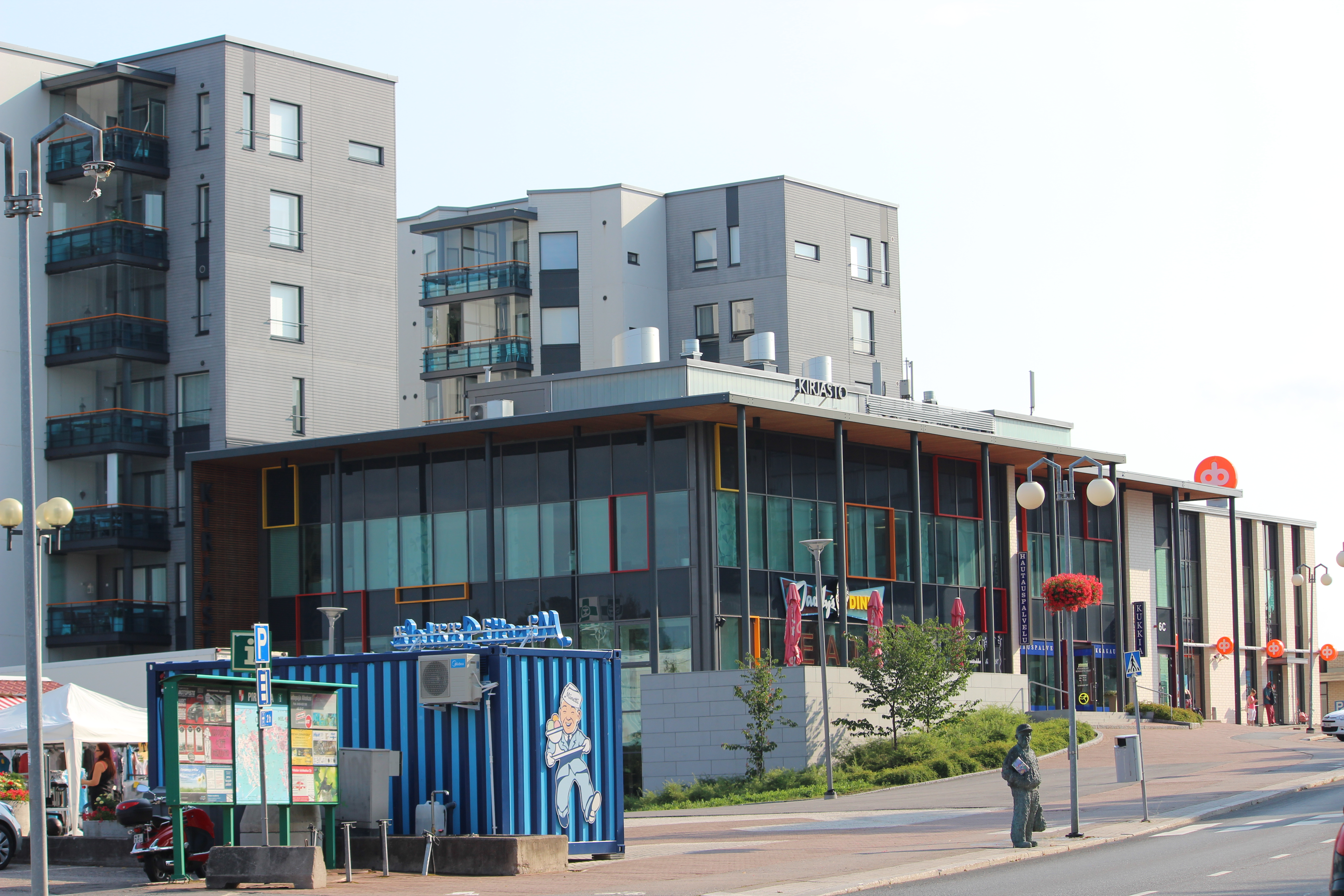
Pirkkala Public Library

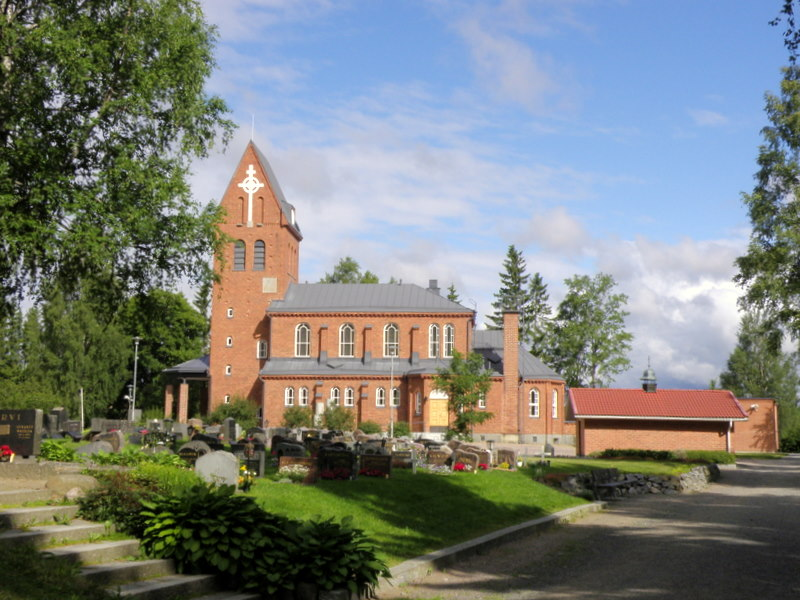
Old Church of Pirkkala

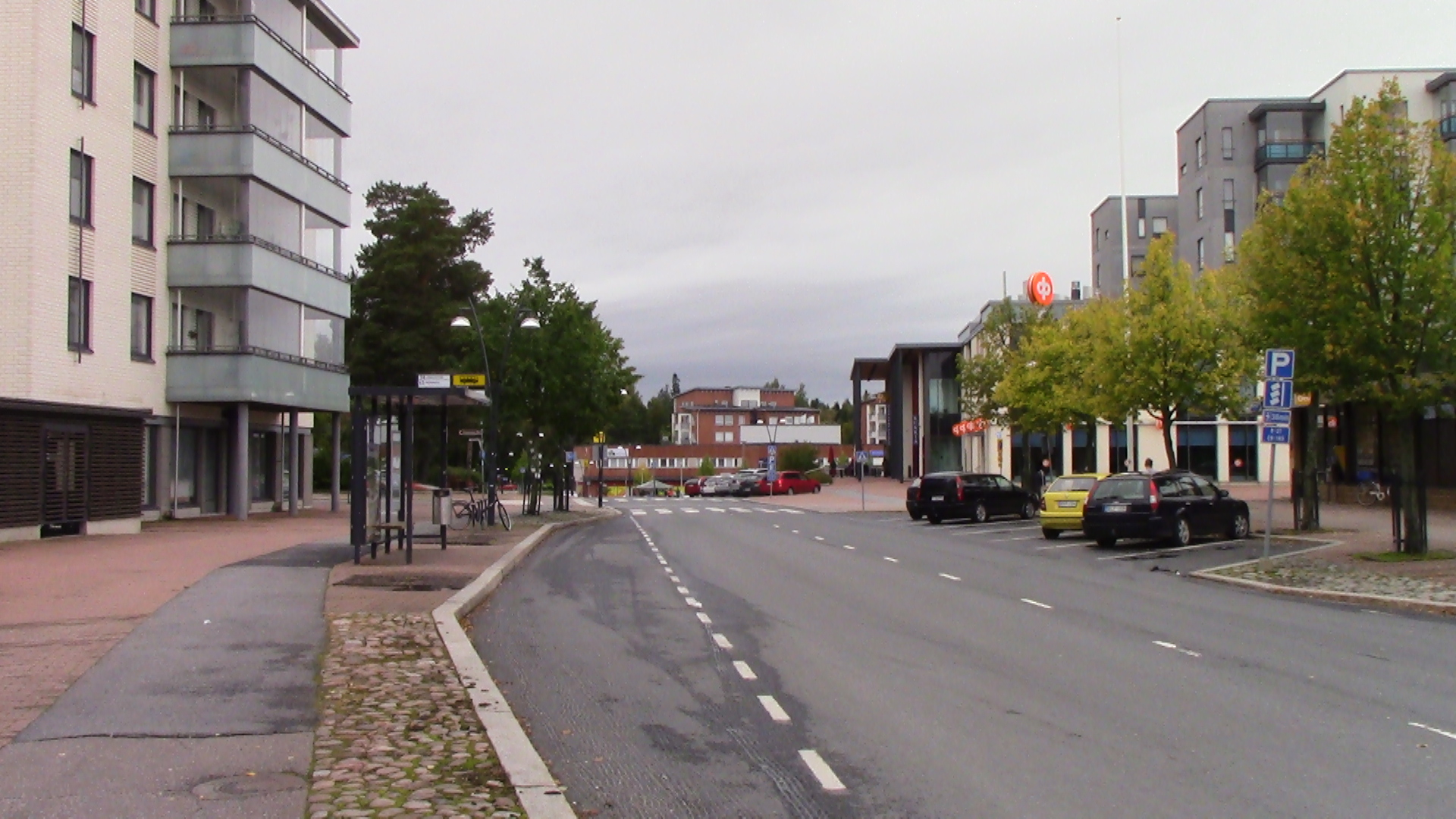
Naistenmatka district along Suupantie

== See also ==
- Birkarls
