= Jon Jonsson (mayor) =

Swedish mayor from 17th century, famous for memoirs called vandringsbok

Jon Jonsson (born 11 April 1582 in Visselfjärda parish, Småland) was a mayor of the city of Arboga, Sweden. He wrote his memoirs, or vandringsbok, in the 1620s. The memoirs describe his time with Duke Karl, the future King Karl IX and the war efforts in the Baltics.

== Biography ==
He was the son of Reverend Jon Jonsson, long-serving vicar of Visselfjärda, and Catharina Nilsdotter, whose lineage traced back to the Halvhjort family of Elmtaryd — a prominent military-peasant clan in southern Småland.

Jon Jonsson received early education in Kalmar, and later studied in Linköping and Växjö before entering royal service under Duke Karl, the future King Charles IX. Jon Jonsson entered the service of Duke Karl (later Karl IX) at a young age. His own memoir, the so-called vandringsbok covering the years 1582–1620, describes in vivid detail his participation in several military expeditions and campaigns, including the Livonian campaigns and the battle of Kirchholm (1605) - a pivotal defeat for Sweden. He partook in logistical and naval operations across the Baltic region including escorting horses and supplies, helping arm Sweden’s forces, and working under the high command, alongside Erik Elofsson and other officers. He developed an administrative and logistical role, and was tasked with overseeing wartime supply and armaments production. He traveled widely across Finland, Livonia, Småland, and Södermanland, often under dangerous and primitive conditions.

From the 1610s onward, Jon Jonsson took on greater responsibilities in arms procurement and production. He was dispatched to Arboga, Eskilstuna, and Nyköping to oversee the manufacturing of armor, muskets, pikes, and artillery components at arms factories of Louis de Geer. Jon Jonsson married Anna Hansdotter, daughter of a German forest manager for Duke Karl. He named their children Palmgren, a name that later was transformed by daughter Elisabeth and her husband Nils Svensson to surname Palmroth. Eventually, his role transitioned from field work to urban administration, culminating in his appointment as mayor of Arboga in the 1630s, a city central to Sweden’s growing military-industrial economy. Jon Jonsson died in 1663, he was buried in the Arboga Uppkyrkan church
