= Naistenmatka =

Village in Pirkkala, Finland

Coordinates: 61°27′55″N 23°38′49″E

Location of Pirkkala in Finland

Naistenmatka is the town and at the same time the administrative center of the municipality of Pirkkala in Pirkanmaa, Finland. Its population was 800 people in 1997, or about 15% of Pirkkala's population.

== Etymology ==
There is no obvious explanation for the name of Naistenmatka (literally meaning "women's journey" or "women's trip"). Many of the explanatory stories refer to women's church trips to Pirkkala Church by residents of the Lake Näsijärvi's region, but the explanatory models vary.

== History ==
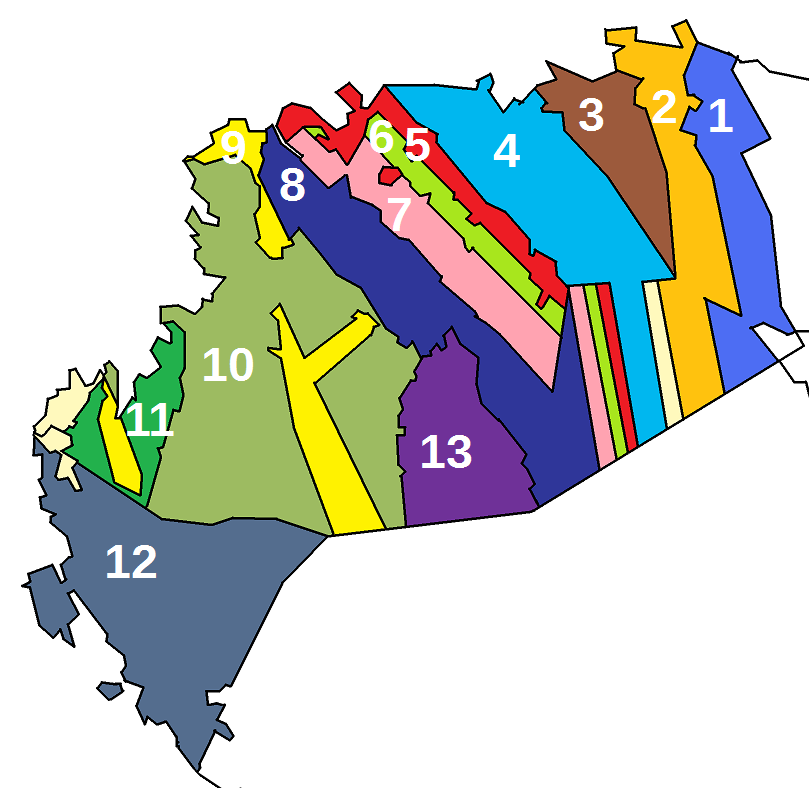
Location of Naistenmatka (labelled #4 on map) within Pirkkala

The first buildings in the village of Naistenmatka were in the 16th century in Suupanmäki. Pirkkala's services began to focus on Naistenmatka in the early 1950s, and soon the area became the center of the municipality (known as Suuppa). The municipal hall was completed in 1964, the school center 1968–1973, the library 1977 in and the health center in 1986. The new church of Pirkkala is also located near Naistenmatka, and the school center includes the Naistenmatka School, Suupanniitty School, and Pirkkala High School.

The municipal center is to be developed in the next few years - some of Pirkkala's services, such as the post office, have moved to the Tampere border in the area of the Partola shopping center. The surface of Lake Vähäjärvi, which separates Naistenmatka and the Vähäjärvi district, was raised and improved in the late 1990s.

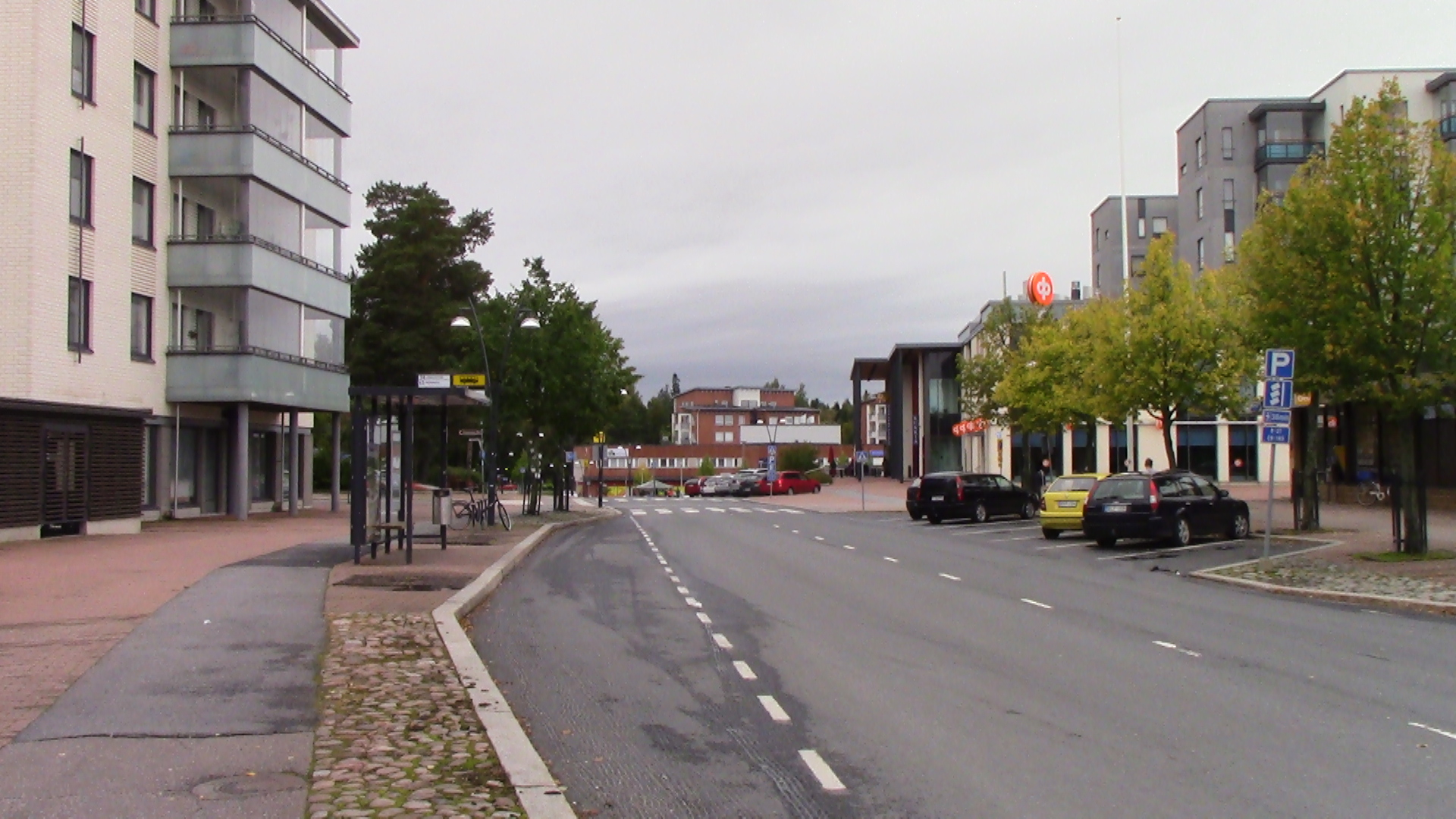
Suuppa area in Naistenmatka

== See also ==
- Naistenlahti, a district in Tampere
