= Lyckebyån =

River in Sweden

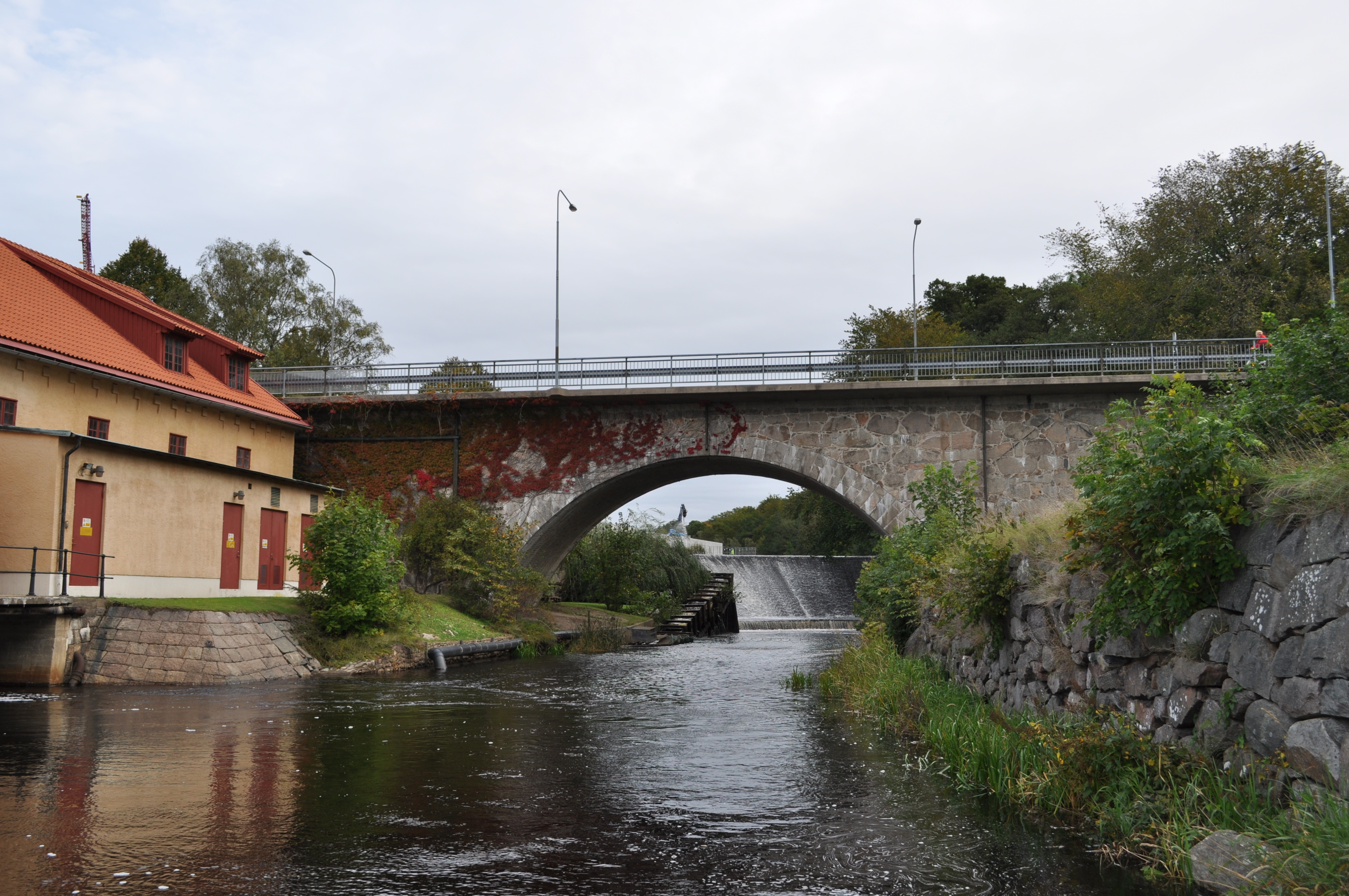

Location
- Country: Sweden

Physical characteristics
- Mouth: Baltic Sea
  - location: Lyckeby, Karlskrona Municipality
  - coordinates: 56°11′20″N 15°39′00″E
  - elevation: 0 m (0 ft)
- Length: 90 km (56 mi)
- Basin size: 810.3 km^{2} (312.9 sq mi)
- Discharge
  - average: 6 m^{3}/s (210 cu ft/s)

Lyckebyån is a river in Sweden.
