= Pertti Palmroth =

Finnish shoe designer (1931–2020)

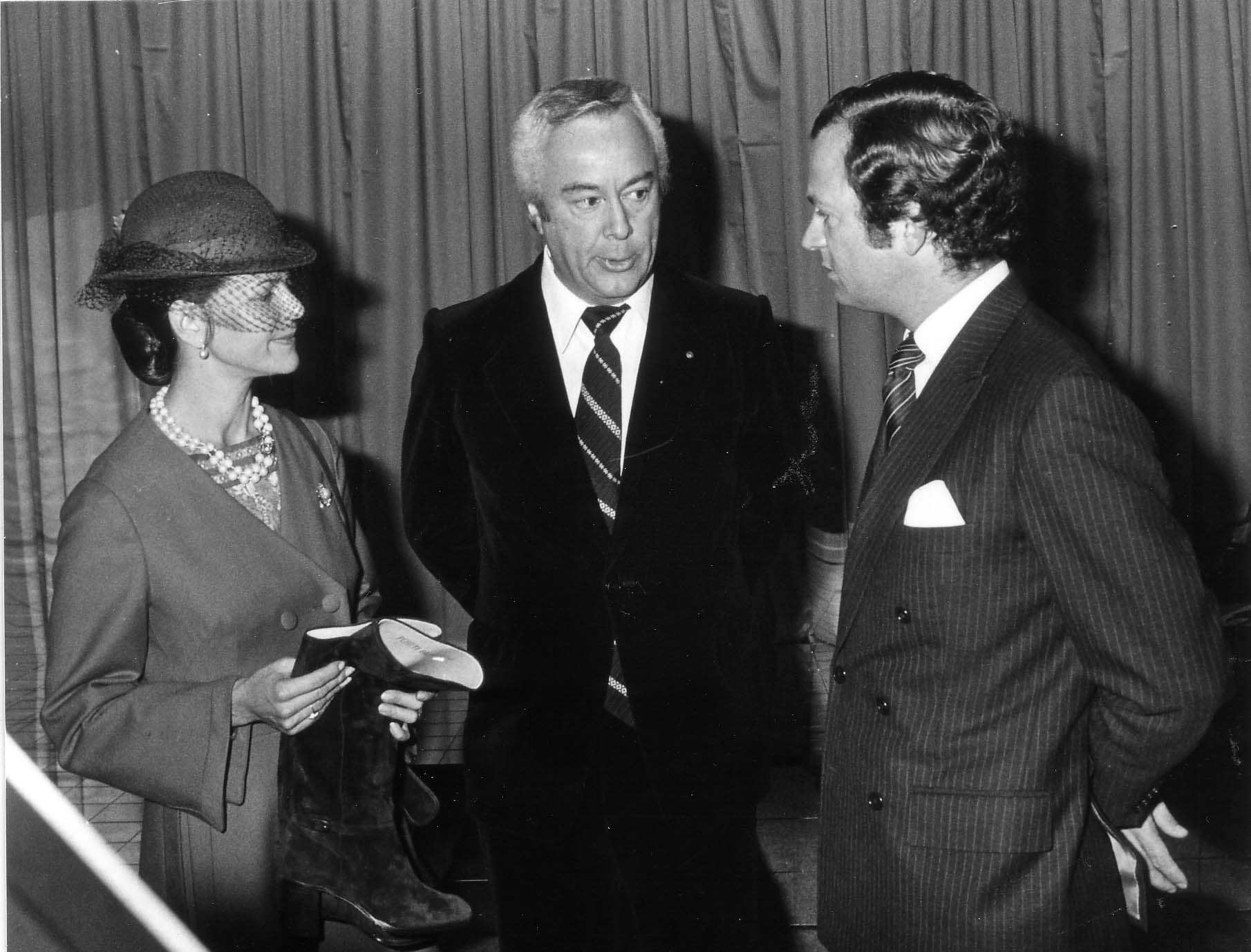
Pertti Palmroth receiving guests at factory

Pertti Pauli llmari Palmroth (August 12, 1931 – March 29, 2020) was a Finnish shoe designer.

== Career ==
In the early 1960s Pertti Palmroth took his collection that was made in his fathers factory and travelled to Sweden, France, the US and Canada and many other countries. At the time it was a risky venture. But the collection was received well, Products were sold to designer Christian Dior in Paris, appeared in the US Vogue and the shoes were sold in department stores like Bloomingdales, Bergdorf Goodman, Saks Fifth Avenue, Harrods and many boutiques all over Europe and North America.

A new factory was built in Waalwijk in the Netherlands for the international market, and it served as a base for the sales to Western Europe and North America.

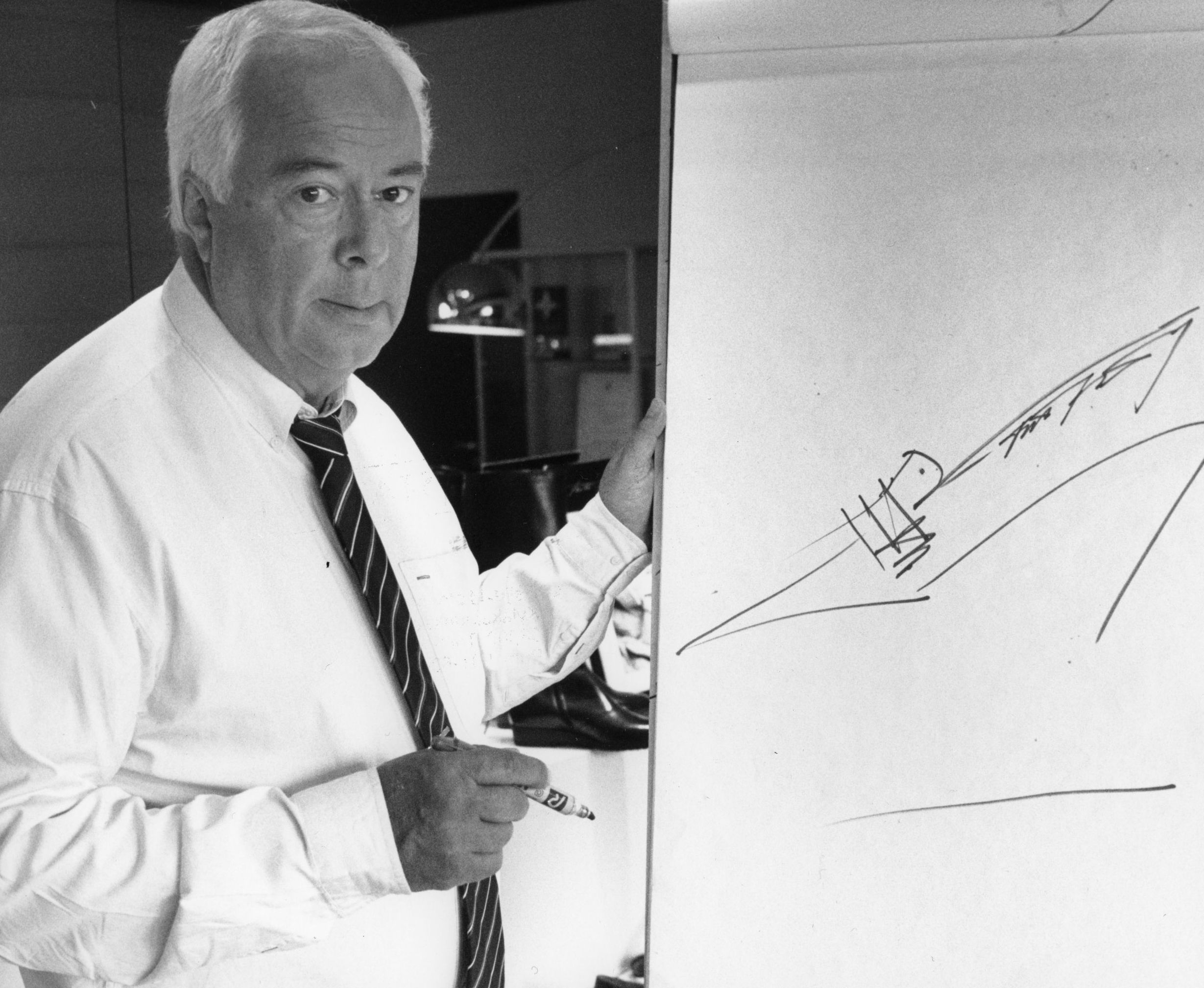
Pertti Palmroth and his design

== Acknowledgments ==
- Coupe D'or du Bon Gout Francais -prize in 1965 in France
- The Internationalization Award of the President of Finland (Tasavallan Presidentin kansainvälistymispalkinto) in 1980

== Private life ==
Pertti Palmroth was married twice, in 1952–1986 to Marja-Leena Miettinen and in 1988–2020 to Hannele Paasonen. He had seven children. Most of his life he lived in Pirkkala.
