= Johan Palmroth =

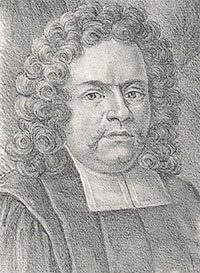
Johan Palmroth (alias Palmroot)

Johan Palmroth, also known as Johan Palmroot, was professor in theology and oriental languages, a scholar and theologian at Uppsala University during the late 17th and early 18th century. He was Rector Magnificus of the Uppsala University during 1705 and 1714.

His major works include: Historia Linguae Sanctae (Uppsala, 1696), De Divina Inspiratione Scripturae Sacrae (1704) and numerous theses and public disputations in Latin and Hebrew.

He championed the study of the Old Testament in its original languages and laid groundwork for later Swedish theological thought. He also mentored future leaders of the Swedish Church.

== Biography ==
Johan Palmroth was born in the 1650s, in Arboga, Sweden, into a respected family of scholars and merchants. His mother, Elisabeth Palmgren, was the daughter of Jon Jonsson, mayor of Arboga .His father, Nils Svensson, was a trader and city councillor. The family had strong ties to Sweden’s rising educated class. Together with his brother Petter Palmroth he entered Uppsala University in 1668. His brother Anders Palmroth also became professor at the University of Tartu and later head librarian at the Uppsala University Library

He specialized in Oriental languages—Hebrew, Syriac, Arabic, and Chaldean. In 1693, he was appointed Adjunct Professor. In 1696, he became Professor of Oriental Languages. In 1701, he succeeded to the professorship of Theology. In 1705, he earned his Doctorate in Theology and became a member of Uppsala Consistory.

His work bridged languages, theology, and religious philosophy. He was involved in editing texts like the Thesauri Philologici and taught alongside and influenced notable scholars like Olof Celsius the Elder, Daniel Lundius, and Erik Benzelius.

Johan married Cecilia Thel, daughter of Pastor Petrus Thel, in 1698.They had a daughter, Elisabeth Palmroth, who was raised with a strong academic upbringing and later married Bishop Göran Wallin.

In the early 1700s, Uppsala University was experiencing financial difficulties, especially after the Great Northern War, the devastating fire of 1702 and general economic strain across the Swedish Empire. This led the university leadership to repeatedly petition the King for support and decisions regarding land sales, taxation, and governance issues. Johan Palmroth was rector of the Uppsala University twice during this period and signed the petition to King Karl XII for help. Palmroth died in 1727.
