= Ville-Matti Koponen =

Finnish ice hockey player

- Born: 4 January 1984 (age 42) Lahti, Finland
- Height: 6 ft 2 in (188 cm)
- Weight: 178 lb (81 kg; 12 st 10 lb)
- Position: Centre
- Shot: Right
- Played for: Pelicans; Haukat; HeKi; TuTo; KooKoo; Kiekko-Laser; Oulun Kärpät; Hokki
- Playing career: 2004–2019

Ville-Matti Koponen (born January 4, 1984, in Lahti) is a Finnish former professional ice hockey forward who last played for Peliitat Heinola of the Mestis.

He started his career in Pelicans and played with the team until 2007.

== Career statistics ==
| | | | Regular season | | | | | Playoffs |
| Season | Team | League | GP | G | A | Pts | PIM | GP | G | A | Pts | PIM |
|---|---|---|---|---|---|---|---|---|---|---|---|---|
| 1999–00 | Kiekkoreipas U16 | U16 SM-sarja | 11 | 7 | 6 | 13 | 0 | — | — | — | — | — |
| 2000–01 | Kiekkoreipas U18 | U18 SM-sarja | 33 | 9 | 12 | 21 | 10 | — | — | — | — | — |
| 2001–02 | Kiekkoreipas U18 | U18 SM-sarja | 28 | 14 | 32 | 46 | 14 | 4 | 2 | 4 | 6 | 0 |
| 2001–02 | Lahti Pelicans U20 | U20 SM-liiga | 5 | 1 | 3 | 4 | 2 | — | — | — | — | — |
| 2002–03 | Lahti Pelicans U20 | U20 SM-liiga | 30 | 6 | 5 | 11 | 24 | — | — | — | — | — |
| 2003–04 | Lahti Pelicans U20 | U20 SM-liiga | 36 | 7 | 21 | 28 | 59 | — | — | — | — | — |
| 2003–04 | Suomi U20 | Mestis | 1 | 1 | 0 | 1 | 0 | — | — | — | — | — |
| 2004–05 | Lahti Pelicans U20 | U20 SM-liiga | 22 | 7 | 11 | 18 | 10 | 4 | 1 | 0 | 1 | 4 |
| 2004–05 | Lahti Pelicans | SM-liiga | 25 | 0 | 2 | 2 | 8 | — | — | — | — | — |
| 2005–06 | Lahti Pelicans | SM-liiga | 41 | 2 | 4 | 6 | 22 | — | — | — | — | — |
| 2005–06 | Haukat | Mestis | 1 | 0 | 0 | 0 | 2 | — | — | — | — | — |
| 2006–07 | Lahti Pelicans | SM-liiga | 36 | 0 | 5 | 5 | 12 | 6 | 0 | 0 | 0 | 0 |
| 2006–07 | HeKi | Mestis | 16 | 8 | 1 | 9 | 57 | — | — | — | — | — |
| 2007–08 | HeKi | Mestis | 32 | 4 | 15 | 19 | 24 | — | — | — | — | — |
| 2007–08 | Lahti Pelicans | SM-liiga | 4 | 0 | 0 | 0 | 0 | — | — | — | — | — |
| 2008–09 | TUTO Hockey | Mestis | 44 | 11 | 25 | 36 | 30 | 10 | 3 | 4 | 7 | 6 |
| 2009–10 | KooKoo | Mestis | 44 | 6 | 16 | 22 | 42 | 10 | 0 | 2 | 2 | 8 |
| 2010–11 | Kiekko-Laser | Mestis | 33 | 7 | 18 | 25 | 16 | — | — | — | — | — |
| 2010–11 | Oulun Kärpät | SM-liiga | 23 | 0 | 3 | 3 | 2 | 3 | 0 | 0 | 0 | 0 |
| 2011–12 | Oulun Kärpät | SM-liiga | 9 | 0 | 0 | 0 | 4 | 1 | 0 | 1 | 1 | 0 |
| 2011–12 | Kiekko-Laser | Mestis | — | — | — | — | — | — | — | — | — | — |
| 2011–12 | Hokki | Mestis | 4 | 0 | 4 | 4 | 2 | — | — | — | — | — |
| 2012–13 | KooKoo | Mestis | 2 | 0 | 0 | 0 | 0 | — | — | — | — | — |
| 2012–13 | Peliitat Heinola | Mestis | 39 | 7 | 16 | 23 | 18 | 6 | 1 | 1 | 2 | 4 |
| 2013–14 | Peliitat Heinola | Mestis | 56 | 4 | 26 | 30 | 22 | — | — | — | — | — |
| 2014–15 | Peliitat Heinola | Mestis | 48 | 4 | 26 | 30 | 53 | — | — | — | — | — |
| 2015–16 | Peliitat Heinola | Mestis | 47 | 1 | 14 | 15 | 24 | — | — | — | — | — |
| 2016–17 | Peliitat Heinola | Mestis | 44 | 2 | 11 | 13 | 12 | 4 | 0 | 2 | 2 | 0 |
| 2016–17 | Lahti Pelicans | Liiga | 10 | 0 | 1 | 1 | 0 | — | — | — | — | — |
| 2017–18 | Peliitat Heinola | Mestis | 47 | 5 | 8 | 13 | 14 | — | — | — | — | — |
| 2017–18 | Lahti Pelicans | Liiga | 2 | 0 | 0 | 0 | 0 | — | — | — | — | — |
| 2018–19 | Peliitat Heinola | Mestis | 38 | 3 | 2 | 5 | 30 | — | — | — | — | — |
| SM-liiga totals | | | 150 | 2 | 15 | 17 | 48 | 10 | 0 | 1 | 1 | 0 |
| Mestis totals | | | 496 | 63 | 182 | 245 | 346 | 30 | 4 | 9 | 13 | 18 |
