= Toni Kirén =

Finnish ice hockey player

- Born: 18 June 1984 (age 42) Lahti, Finland
- Height: 6 ft 1 in (185 cm)
- Weight: 183 lb (83 kg; 13 st 1 lb)
- Position: Defence
- Shoots: Left
- SM-liiga team: Kärpät
- Playing career: 2003–present

Toni Kirén (born 18 June 1984) is a Finnish professional ice hockey player who played with Kärpät in the SM-liiga during the 2010–11 season.

Kirén previously played for Pelicans Lahti, Haukat, HeKi and HPK.

== Career statistics ==
			Regular season					Playoffs
Season	Team	League	GP	G	A	Pts	PIM	GP	G	A	Pts	PIM
1999–00	Kiekkoreipas U16	U16 SM-sarja	11	2	4	6	10	—	—	—	—	—
2000–01	Kiekkoreipas U18	U18 SM-sarja	32	1	3	4	57	—	—	—	—	—
2001–02	Kiekkoreipas U18	U18 SM-sarja	25	3	12	15	18	3	0	3	3	6
2001–02	Pelicans U20	U20 SM-liiga	3	0	0	0	0	—	—	—	—	—
2002–03	Pelicans U20	U20 SM-liiga	32	2	3	5	65	—	—	—	—	—
2003–04	Pelicans U20	U20 SM-liiga	32	2	9	11	38	—	—	—	—	—
2003–04	Lahti Pelicans	SM-liiga	24	1	0	1	10	—	—	—	—	—
2003–04	Suomi U20	Mestis	4	0	0	0	2	—	—	—	—	—
2004–05	Pelicans U20	U20 SM-liiga	34	2	2	4	44	4	0	1	1	4
2004–05	Lahti Pelicans	SM-liiga	11	0	0	0	0	—	—	—	—	—
2005–06	Haukat	Mestis	42	2	3	5	70	—	—	—	—	—
2006–07	HeKi	Mestis	44	4	15	19	62	3	0	1	1	4
2007–08	Oulun Kärpät	SM-liiga	31	0	0	0	2	6	0	0	0	0
2007–08	Hokki	Mestis	5	0	2	2	4	—	—	—	—	—
2007–08	HPK	SM-liiga	3	0	0	0	4	—	—	—	—	—
2008–09	Oulun Kärpät	SM-liiga	17	0	0	0	4	—	—	—	—	—
2008–09	Hokki	Mestis	11	0	1	1	8	—	—	—	—	—
2008–09	HPK	SM-liiga	11	0	0	0	2	6	0	0	0	4
2009–10	KooKoo	Mestis	41	2	9	11	30	10	0	1	1	2
2010–11	Kiekko-Laser	Mestis	40	9	11	20	59	3	0	0	0	2
2010–11	Oulun Kärpät	SM-liiga	8	0	0	0	2	—	—	—	—	—
2011–12	Kiekko-Laser	Mestis	—	—	—	—	—	—	—	—	—	—
2011–12	KooKoo	Mestis	17	0	4	4	6	9	0	2	2	8
2012–13	Asplöven HC	HockeyAllsvenskan	10	0	0	0	31	—	—	—	—	—
2012–13	Kalix UHC	Hockeyettan	22	1	6	7	26	—	—	—	—	—
SM-liiga totals			105	1	0	1	24	12	0	0	0	4
Mestis totals			204	17	45	62	241	28	0	5	5	26
