= Ilkka Heikkilä =

Finnish ice hockey centre

- Born: July 1, 1988 (age 36); Jyväskylän mlk, Finland
- Height: 5 ft 11 in (180 cm)
- Weight: 194 lb (88 kg; 13 st 12 lb)
- Position: Centre
- Shot: Left
- Played for: Titaanit; SaPKo; D Team; Hokki; IPK
- Playing career: 2008–2017

Ilkka Heikkilä (born July 1, 1988) is a retired Finnish ice hockey centre.

== Career ==
Heikkilä began his playing career with JYP, playing in their various junior teams at U16, U18 and U20 level but never managed to play for their senior team. During this, he played in the 2006 IIHF World U18 Championships for Finland where they claimed a silver medal, losing in the final to the United States.

Heikkilä went on to play a total of 216 games in Finland's second-tier league Mestis, playing for Titaanit, SaPKo, D Team, Hokki and IPK.

On August 17, 2018, Heikkilä became team manager of IPK which ended his playing career.

== Career statistics ==
			Regular season					Playoffs
Season	Team	League	GP	G	A	Pts	PIM	GP	G	A	Pts	PIM
2002–03	JYP Jyväskylä U16	U16 SM-sarja	14	9	7	16	8	4	0	5	5	0
2003–04	JYP Jyväskylä U16	U16 SM-sarja	5	3	4	7	0	—	—	—	—	—
2003–04	JYP Jyväskylä U18	U18 SM-sarja	14	0	2	2	24	—	—	—	—	—
2004–05	JYP Jyväskylä U18	U18 SM-sarja	28	9	13	22	12	2	0	0	0	0
2004–05	JYP Jyväskylä U20	U20 SM-liiga	1	0	0	0	0	2	0	0	0	0
2005–06	JYP Jyväskylä U18	U18 SM-sarja	2	2	3	5	2	—	—	—	—	—
2005–06	JYP Jyväskylä U20	U20 SM-liiga	37	6	9	15	35	10	4	3	7	6
2006–07	JYP Jyväskylä U20	U20 SM-liiga	42	4	17	21	30	—	—	—	—	—
2007–08	JYP Jyväskylä U20	U20 SM-liiga	36	11	26	37	26	9	4	1	5	0
2007–08	Suomi U20	Mestis	6	1	3	4	4	—	—	—	—	—
2008–09	Kotkan Titaanit	Mestis	41	2	8	10	12	—	—	—	—	—
2009–10	Kotkan Titaanit	Suomi-sarja	5	3	3	6	0	—	—	—	—	—
2009–10	SaPKo	Mestis	14	0	3	3	2	—	—	—	—	—
2010–11	D Team	Mestis	48	10	19	29	26	8	0	1	1	0
2011–12	SaPKo	Mestis	44	4	12	16	16	5	0	1	1	2
2012–13	IPK	Suomi-sarja	39	28	43	71	37	—	—	—	—	—
2012–13	Hokki	Mestis	2	0	0	0	0	—	—	—	—	—
2013–14	IPK	2. Divisioona	24	16	32	48	10	4	0	11	11	0
2014–15	IPK	Suomi-sarja	31	9	16	25	41	—	—	—	—	—
2015–16	IPK	Suomi-sarja	35	6	21	27	24	6	3	5	8	2
2016–17	IPK	Mestis	36	2	3	5	16	—	—	—	—	—
Mestis totals			191	19	48	67	76	13	0	2	2	2
Suomi-sarja totals			110	46	83	129	102	6	3	5	8	2
