= Tommi Leinonen =

Finnish ice hockey player

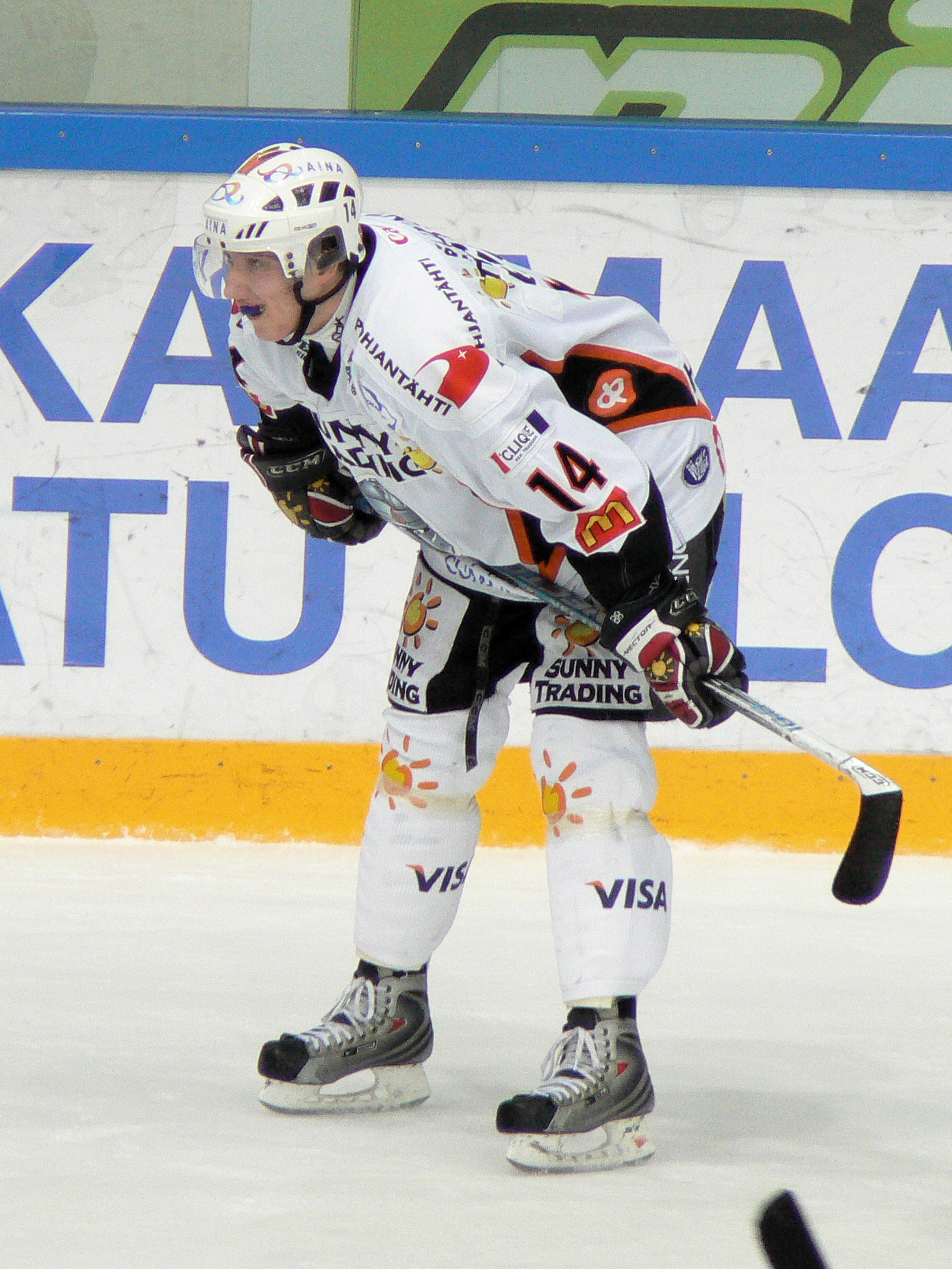
- Born: May 14, 1987 (age 39) Kajaani, Finland
- Height: 6 ft 2 in (188 cm)
- Weight: 201 lb (91 kg; 14 st 5 lb)
- Position: Defense
- Shot: Left
- AUS2 team Former teams: EHC Lustenau; Hokki; HPK; Karpat; Kiekko-Laser; LeKi; TuTo
- National team: Finland
- NHL draft: 125th overall, 2005; Pittsburgh Penguins
- Playing career: 2006–2015

Tommi Leinonen
Medal record

Representing Finland

Ice hockey

World Junior Championships
Bronze medal – third place	2006 Canada	

Tommi Leinonen (born May 14, 1987) is a Finnish professional ice hockey player who currently plays for EHC Lustenau of the second-tier Austrian National League.

== Awards ==
- 2005–06: Jr. A SM-liiga Silver Medal
- 2005–06: SM-liiga Bronze Medal
- 2005–06: U20 WJC Bronze Medal
- 2006–07: Kanada-Malja winner, Kärpät

== Career statistics ==
=== Regular season and playoffs ===
			Regular season					Playoffs
Season	Team	League	GP	G	A	Pts	PIM	GP	G	A	Pts	PIM
2003–04	Kärpät	FIN U18	28	9	3	12	30	2	0	0	0	0
2004–05	Kärpät	FIN U18	1	0	0	0	0	—	—	—	—	—
2004–05	Kärpät	FIN U20	36	9	11	20	16	1	0	0	0	0
2005–06	Kärpät	FIN U20	27	8	7	15	28	9	0	3	3	8
2005–06	Kärpät	SM-l	3	0	0	0	0	—	—	—	—	—
2005–06	Suomi U20	Mestis	6	1	0	1	4	—	—	—	—	—
2006–07	Kärpät	FIN U20	26	4	8	12	52	—	—	—	—	—
2006–07	Kärpät	SM-l	13	0	0	0	4	—	—	—	—	—
2006–07	Suomi U20	Mestis	7	3	0	3	4	—	—	—	—	—
2007–08	HPK	SM-l	52	2	3	5	26	—	—	—	—	—
2007–08	TUTO Hockey	Mestis	1	0	3	3	0	—	—	—	—	—
2007–08	HPK	FIN U20	—	—	—	—	—	9	1	4	5	6
2008–09	HPK	FIN U20	1	0	0	0	0	—	—	—	—	—
2008–09	HPK	SM-l	25	0	0	0	6	—	—	—	—	—
2008–09	LeKi	Mestis	10	1	2	3	6	—	—	—	—	—
2008–09	Hokki	Mestis	1	0	0	0	25	11	0	0	0	10
2009–10	Hokki	Mestis	39	2	3	5	30	—	—	—	—	—
2010–11	Kiekko–Laser	Mestis	31	1	13	14	18	3	0	1	1	2
2011–12	HC Merano	ITA.2	19	8	11	19	22	5	3	2	5	6
2012–13	Ahmat Haukipudas	FIN.3	4	1	1	2	4	—	—	—	—	—
2012–13	EHC Lustenau	INL	16	2	7	9	16	—	—	—	—	—
2014–15	Uleåborg A.I.K	FIN.4	9	6	4	10	6	4	0	2	2	2
SM-l totals			94	2	3	5	36	—	—	—	—	—
Mestis totals			95	8	21	29	87	14	0	1	1	12

=== International ===
Year	Team	Event	GP	G	A	Pts	PIM
2005	Finland	WJC18	6	0	0	0	4
2006	Finland	WJC	6	0	2	2	8
2007	Finland	WJC	6	0	0	0	6
Junior totals			18	0	2	2	18
