= Anssi Rantanen =

Finnish ice hockey player

- Born: 3 August 1982 (age 42); Punkalaidun, Finland
- Height: 6 ft 2 in (188 cm)
- Weight: 218 lb (99 kg; 15 st 8 lb)
- Position: Defence
- Shoots: Left
- Erste Liga team Former teams: Ferencvárosi TC; Lukko; HC TPS; SønderjyskE; MHC Martin; DVTK Jegesmedvék
- Playing career: 2002–present

Anssi Rantanen (born 3 August 1982) is a Finnish professional ice hockey defenceman who currently plays for Ferencvárosi TC of the Erste Liga. He previously played in Liiga for Lukko and TPS.

== Career statistics ==
			Regular season					Playoffs
Season	Team	League	GP	G	A	Pts	PIM	GP	G	A	Pts	PIM
1999–00	FPS U20	U20 I-Divisioona	5	0	0	0	0	—	—	—	—	—
2000–01	FPS U20	U20 I-Divisioona	25	3	2	5	22	6	0	2	2	0
2001–02	FPS U20	U20 SM-liiga	40	3	2	5	40	—	—	—	—	—
2002–03	FPS	Mestis	42	5	9	14	85	—	—	—	—	—
2003–04	FPS	Mestis	44	2	7	9	46	—	—	—	—	—
2004–05	FPS	Mestis	40	0	3	3	87	—	—	—	—	—
2005–06	FPS	Mestis	43	5	7	12	119	—	—	—	—	—
2006–07	FPS	Mestis	43	3	6	9	120	—	—	—	—	—
2007–08	Hokki	Mestis	42	3	8	11	96	12	1	2	3	18
2008–09	Hokki	Mestis	26	10	7	17	71	—	—	—	—	—
2008–09	Lukko	SM-liiga	18	0	0	0	66	—	—	—	—	—
2009–10	Lukko	SM-liiga	49	1	3	4	121	4	0	0	0	2
2010–11	Lukko	SM-liiga	22	0	3	3	42	12	0	2	2	45
2010–11	Hokki	Mestis	6	0	2	2	4	—	—	—	—	—
2011–12	Lukko	SM-liiga	36	1	6	7	30	3	0	0	0	2
2012–13	Lukko	SM-liiga	1	0	0	0	6	—	—	—	—	—
2012–13	LeKi	Mestis	4	0	1	1	14	—	—	—	—	—
2012–13	Hokki	Mestis	5	0	2	2	2	—	—	—	—	—
2012–13	HC TPS	SM-liiga	32	1	2	3	30	—	—	—	—	—
2013–14	Hokki	Mestis	27	2	8	10	18	—	—	—	—	—
2013–14	SønderjyskE Ishockey	Denmark	14	0	5	5	28	12	0	2	2	10
2014–15	Arystan Temirtau	Kazakhstan	12	0	1	1	22	—	—	—	—	—
2014–15	Yuzhny Ural Orsk	VHL	17	1	0	1	20	—	—	—	—	—
2015–16	Kulager Petropavl	Kazakhstan	34	8	8	16	22	—	—	—	—	—
2015–16	SønderjyskE Ishockey	Denmark	17	1	5	6	12	13	0	2	2	10
2016–17	MHC Martin	Slovak	14	1	1	2	20	—	—	—	—	—
2016–17	Orlik Opole	Poland	24	3	10	13	16	5	0	0	0	4
2017–18	DVTK Jegesmedvék	Erste Liga	37	5	20	25	79	14	2	4	6	20
2018–19	Ferencvárosi TC	Erste Liga	44	3	28	31	36	13	4	7	11	12
2019–20	Ferencvárosi TC	Erste Liga	36	8	18	26	28	8	2	2	4	4
2020–21	FPS	Mestis	30	1	6	7	42	—	—	—	—	—
2021–22	FPS	Mestis	45	4	13	17	32	14	1	4	5	14
SM-liiga totals			158	3	14	17	295	26	0	2	2	77
Mestis totals			397	35	79	114	736	32	3	7	10	40
