= Henri Kivioja =

Finnish ice hockey right winger

- Born: 20 June 1986 (age 39); Iisalmi, Finland
- Height: 5 ft 8 in (173 cm)
- Weight: 183 lb (83 kg; 13 st 1 lb)
- Position: Right wing
- Shoots: Right
- team Former teams: Free agent SaiPa
- Playing career: 2007–present

Henri Kivioja (born 20 June 1986) is a Finnish professional ice hockey right winger. He is currently a free agent having last played for IPK of Mestis.

Kivioja played three games for SaiPa during the 2007–08 SM-liiga season.

== Career statistics ==
| | | | Regular season | | | | | Playoffs |
| Season | Team | League | GP | G | A | Pts | PIM | GP | G | A | Pts | PIM |
|---|---|---|---|---|---|---|---|---|---|---|---|---|
| 2001–02 | Iisalmen Peli-Karhut U16 | U16 I-Divisioona | 8 | 18 | 6 | 24 | 77 | — | — | — | — | — |
| 2002–03 | HIFK U18 | U18 SM-sarja | 15 | 4 | 3 | 7 | 16 | 1 | 0 | 0 | 0 | 0 |
| 2003–04 | HIFK U18 | U18 SM-sarja | 26 | 16 | 10 | 26 | 26 | 7 | 3 | 3 | 6 | 16 |
| 2004–05 | KalPa U20 | U20 SM-liiga | 29 | 4 | 6 | 10 | 24 | — | — | — | — | — |
| 2005–06 | Iisalmen Peli-Karhut | 2. Divisioona | 21 | 14 | 12 | 26 | 28 | 4 | 0 | 1 | 1 | 12 |
| 2006–07 | HIFK U20 | U20 SM-liiga | 40 | 17 | 22 | 39 | 55 | 11 | 6 | 1 | 7 | 6 |
| 2007–08 | Kiekko-Vantaa | Mestis | 42 | 16 | 18 | 34 | 32 | — | — | — | — | — |
| 2007–08 | SaiPa | SM-liiga | 3 | 0 | 0 | 0 | 0 | — | — | — | — | — |
| 2008–09 | KooKoo | Mestis | 36 | 10 | 12 | 22 | 26 | 5 | 1 | 0 | 1 | 12 |
| 2009–10 | RoKi | Mestis | 43 | 13 | 12 | 25 | 62 | — | — | — | — | — |
| 2010–11 | Jokipojat | Mestis | 47 | 14 | 15 | 29 | 82 | — | — | — | — | — |
| 2011–12 | Iisalmen Peli-Karhut | Suomi-sarja | 13 | 6 | 0 | 6 | 35 | — | — | — | — | — |
| 2012–13 | Iisalmen Peli-Karhut | Suomi-sarja | 43 | 31 | 35 | 66 | 67 | — | — | — | — | — |
| 2013–14 | Iisalmen Peli-Karhut | 2. Divisioona | 20 | 19 | 31 | 50 | 64 | 4 | 6 | 2 | 8 | 0 |
| 2014–15 | Iisalmen Peli-Karhut | Suomi-sarja | 13 | 4 | 1 | 5 | 10 | — | — | — | — | — |
| 2015–16 | Iisalmen Peli-Karhut | Suomi-sarja | 30 | 20 | 17 | 37 | 61 | 4 | 1 | 0 | 1 | 2 |
| 2017–18 | Iisalmen Peli-Karhut | Mestis | 29 | 3 | 2 | 5 | 37 | 5 | 1 | 1 | 2 | 2 |
| 2017–18 | JHT Kalajoki | Suomi-sarja | 2 | 0 | 2 | 2 | 2 | — | — | — | — | — |
| 2018–19 | Iisalmen Peli-Karhut | Mestis | 4 | 1 | 2 | 3 | 6 | — | — | — | — | — |
| 2022–23 | Iisalmen Peli-Karhut | Mestis | 27 | 5 | 5 | 10 | 37 | 4 | 0 | 0 | 0 | 6 |
| SM-liiga totals | | | 3 | 0 | 0 | 0 | 0 | — | — | — | — | — |
| Mestis totals | | | 228 | 62 | 66 | 128 | 282 | 14 | 2 | 1 | 3 | 20 |
| Suomi-sarja totals | | | 101 | 61 | 55 | 116 | 175 | 4 | 1 | 0 | 1 | 2 |
