= Patrik Lostedt =

Finnish ice hockey player

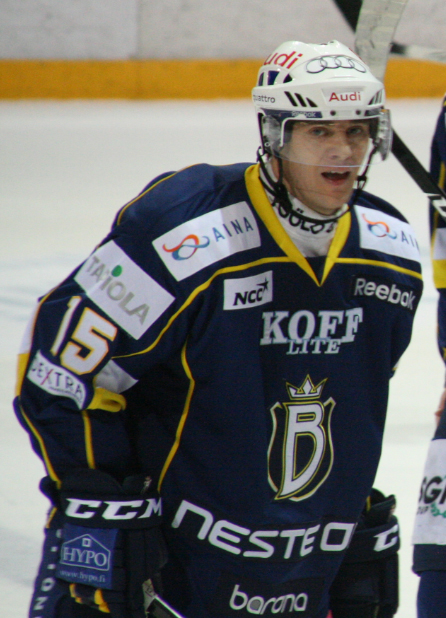
- Patrik Lostedt
- Born: March 19, 1981 (age 44); Helsinki, Finland
- Height: 5 ft 11 in (180 cm)
- Weight: 187 lb (85 kg; 13 st 5 lb)
- Position: Left wing
- Shot: Left
- Played for: HIFK; Espoo Blues
- Playing career: 2001–2014

Patrik Lostedt (born March 19, 1981) is a Finnish professional ice hockey player who used to play for Espoo Blues of the SM-liiga. He currently plays for Bewe Hockey.

== Career statistics ==
			Regular season					Playoffs
Season	Team	League	GP	G	A	Pts	PIM	GP	G	A	Pts	PIM
1996–97	HIFK U16	U16 SM-sarja	10	0	0	0	8	—	—	—	—	—
1997–98	HIFK U18	U18 SM-sarja	22	1	0	1	20	—	—	—	—	—
1998–99	HIFK U18	U18 SM-sarja	21	2	1	3	38	3	0	0	0	28
1999–00	HIFK U20	U20 SM-liiga	37	4	1	5	96	3	1	0	1	4
2000–01	HIFK U20	U20 SM-liiga	40	5	4	9	126	7	0	1	1	32
2001–02	HIFK U20	U20 SM-liiga	40	8	13	21	115	2	0	1	1	2
2001–02	HIFK	SM-liiga	1	0	0	0	0	—	—	—	—	—
2002–03	KJT	Mestis	38	2	7	9	94	—	—	—	—	—
2003–04	Kiekko-Vantaa	Mestis	41	3	1	4	123	5	0	0	0	18
2004–05	Kiekko-Vantaa	Mestis	40	1	3	4	159	1	0	0	0	6
2005–06	HIFK	SM-liiga	48	0	1	1	120	8	0	0	0	8
2006–07	HIFK	SM-liiga	25	1	0	1	28	—	—	—	—	—
2006–07	HC Salamat	Mestis	1	0	1	1	2	—	—	—	—	—
2006–07	Espoo Blues	SM-liiga	10	1	0	1	41	8	1	0	1	46
2007–08	Espoo Blues	SM-liiga	19	0	0	0	62	7	0	0	0	27
2008–09	Espoo Blues	SM-liiga	29	2	0	2	113	—	—	—	—	—
2009–10	Espoo Blues	SM-liiga	35	1	5	6	108	—	—	—	—	—
2010–11	Kiekko-Vantaa	Mestis	25	3	6	9	63	—	—	—	—	—
2010–11	Espoo Blues	SM-liiga	7	0	1	1	29	10	0	0	0	18
2011–12	Bewe	2. Divisioona	23	7	7	14	22	—	—	—	—	—
2012–13	Bewe TuusKi	Suomi-sarja	29	6	13	19	30	—	—	—	—	—
2012–13	Jukurit	Mestis	2	0	0	0	4	8	0	1	1	53
2013–14	Jukurit	Mestis	46	3	1	4	98	7	0	0	0	6
SM-liiga totals			174	5	7	12	501	33	1	0	1	99
Mestis totals			193	12	19	31	543	24	1	1	2	83

== See also ==
- Ice hockey in Finland
