= Tuomas Takala =

Finnish ice hockey player

- Born: October 1, 1984 (age 41) Seinäjoki, Finland
- Height: 5 ft 11 in (180 cm)
- Weight: 179 lb (81 kg; 12 st 11 lb)
- Position: Centre
- Shoots: Left
- Suomi-sarja team Former teams: S-Kiekko; SM-liiga; Ässät; Mestis; Kokkolan Hermes; Sport
- NHL draft: Undrafted
- Playing career: 2002–present

Tuomas Takala (born October 1, 1984) is a Finnish professional ice hockey player. He is currently playing for S-Kiekko of the Finnish Suomi-sarja.

Takala played three seasons in the SM-liiga with Ässät. registering 7 goals, 7 assists, 14 points, and 72 penalty minutes, in 154 games played between 2005–06 and 2007–08.

== Career statistics ==
			Regular season					Playoffs
Season	Team	League	GP	G	A	Pts	PIM	GP	G	A	Pts	PIM
2000–01	S-Kiekko U18	U18 I-Divisioona	14	10	10	20	34	—	—	—	—	—
2001–02	SHT	2. Divisioona	—	—	—	—	—	—	—	—	—	—
2002–03	S-Kiekko U20	U20 Suomi-sarja	3	3	1	4	10	—	—	—	—	—
2002–03	SHT	Suomi-sarja	23	8	7	15	67	—	—	—	—	—
2002–03	Porin Ässät U20	U20 SM-liiga	5	2	2	4	2	—	—	—	—	—
2003–04	Porin Ässät U20	U20 SM-liiga	36	11	10	21	79	—	—	—	—	—
2004–05	Porin Ässät U20	U20 SM-liiga	35	11	19	30	65	—	—	—	—	—
2005–06	Porin Ässät	SM-liiga	46	2	3	5	12	14	1	2	3	2
2005–06	Kokkolan Hermes	Mestis	7	0	0	0	4	—	—	—	—	—
2006–07	Porin Ässät	SM-liiga	56	3	3	6	30	—	—	—	—	—
2007–08	Porin Ässät	SM-liiga	52	2	1	3	30	—	—	—	—	—
2008–09	Vaasan Sport	Mestis	44	9	21	30	51	12	1	9	10	6
2009–10	Vaasan Sport	Mestis	44	9	20	29	40	4	0	0	0	8
2010–11	Vaasan Sport	Mestis	46	8	17	25	30	11	0	0	0	4
2011–12	Kiekko-Veljet	2. Divisioona	16	19	37	56	12	5	2	3	5	22
2012–13	S-Kiekko	Suomi-sarja	38	19	40	59	38	—	—	—	—	—
2013–14	S-Kiekko	Suomi-sarja	38	14	46	60	26	3	1	1	2	2
2018–19	S-Kiekko	Suomi-sarja	1	0	1	1	0	—	—	—	—	—
SM-liiga totals			154	7	7	14	72	14	1	2	3	2
Mestis totals			141	26	58	84	125	34	2	10	12	20
