= Toni Mäkiaho =

Finnish ice hockey player

- Born: January 11, 1975 (age 51) Tampere, Finland
- Height: 5 ft 11 in (180 cm)
- Weight: 209 lb (95 kg; 14 st 13 lb)
- Position: Right wing
- Shot: Right
- Played for: HPK; FPS; HIFK; Tappara; Lahti Pelicans; Malmö Redhawks; HC Fribourg-Gottéron; HC Lada Togliatti; Timrå IK; KalPa; HKM Zvolen; Espoo Blues; Kiekko-Vantaa; Oulun Kärpät; EC Dornbirn; HC TPS; LeKi; Kiekkohait; Bewe TuusKi; GrlFK
- Playing career: 1994–2017

Toni Mäkiaho (born January 11, 1975) is a Finnish retired professional ice hockey player.

== Career statistics ==
			Regular season					Playoffs
Season	Team	League	GP	G	A	Pts	PIM	GP	G	A	Pts	PIM
1992–93	Ilves U18	U18 SM-sarja	17	11	10	21	28	—	—	—	—	—
1992–93	Ilves U20	U20 SM-liiga	15	6	8	14	32	—	—	—	—	—
1993–94	Ilves U20	U20 SM-liiga	29	14	13	27	24	6	2	5	7	12
1994–95	HPK U20	U20 I-Divisioona	5	5	3	8	6	—	—	—	—	—
1994–95	HPK	SM-liiga	25	1	2	3	8	—	—	—	—	—
1994–95	FPS	I-Divisioona	7	5	2	7	31	—	—	—	—	—
1995–96	HPK U20	U20 I-Divisioona	—	—	—	—	—	—	—	—	—	—
1995–96	HPK	SM-liiga	50	13	15	28	67	9	0	1	1	16
1996–97	HPK	SM-liiga	45	21	4	25	118	10	4	4	8	10
1997–98	HPK	SM-liiga	40	13	9	22	185	—	—	—	—	—
1998–99	HIFK	SM-liiga	40	11	9	20	170	11	3	0	3	12
1999–00	HIFK	SM-liiga	41	7	6	13	87	9	1	1	2	10
2000–01	HIFK	SM-liga	45	8	10	18	99	5	2	0	2	4
2001–02	HIFK	SM-liiga	39	3	7	10	94	—	—	—	—	—
2002–03	Tappara	SM-liiga	23	0	4	4	65	—	—	—	—	—
2002–03	Lahti Pelicans	SM-liiga	26	8	6	14	55	—	—	—	—	—
2003–04	Lahti Pelicans	SM-liiga	25	7	2	9	36	—	—	—	—	—
2003–04	HPK	SM-liiga	28	6	11	17	63	7	2	1	3	6
2004–05	HPK	SM-liiga	53	8	15	23	114	10	1	1	2	24
2005–06	Malmö Redhawks	HockeyAllsvenskan	18	4	3	7	37	—	—	—	—	—
2005–06	HC Fribourg-Gottéron	NLA	16	5	7	12	22	—	—	—	—	—
2006–07	HPK	SM-liiga	55	15	36	51	51	9	0	1	1	22
2007–08	HPK	SM-liiga	18	8	5	13	45	—	—	—	—	—
2007–08	HC Lada Togliatti	Russia	9	1	1	2	6	—	—	—	—	—
2007–08	HC Fribourg-Gottéron	NLA	9	2	6	8	18	9	4	3	7	4
2008–09	Timrå IK	Elitserien	18	3	3	6	31	—	—	—	—	—
2008–09	KalPa	SM-liiga	23	10	8	18	8	12	4	1	5	16
2009–10	HKM Zvolen	Slovak	9	2	1	3	4	—	—	—	—	—
2009–10	KalPa	SM-liiga	12	1	2	3	18	—	—	—	—	—
2009–10	Espoo Blues	SM-liiga	23	6	8	14	51	3	0	0	0	0
2010–11	Kiekko-Vantaa	Mestis	28	12	20	32	73	—	—	—	—	—
2010–11	Oulun Kärpät	SM-liiga	5	0	0	0	2	—	—	—	—	—
2010–11	EC Dornbirn	Austria2	6	3	4	7	12	8	3	3	6	12
2011–12	HC TPS	SM-liiga	19	2	3	5	12	—	—	—	—	—
2011–12	Kiekko-Vantaa	Mestis	10	2	4	6	12	—	—	—	—	—
2011–12	LeKi	Mestis	2	0	0	0	2	—	—	—	—	—
2011–12	Bewe	2. Divisioona	8	4	14	18	8	—	—	—	—	—
2012–13	Kiekkohait	Suomi-sarja	11	5	8	13	6	—	—	—	—	—
2012–13	Kiekko-Vantaa	Mestis	2	1	0	1	4	—	—	—	—	—
2012–13	Bewe TuusKi	Suomi-sarja	20	4	23	27	20	—	—	—	—	—
2014–15	GrlFK	2. Divisioona	—	—	—	—	—	3	1	1	2	6
2015–16	GrlFK	2. Divisioona	6	0	0	0	4	1	0	0	0	0
2016–17	GrlFK II	III-Divisioona	1	1	0	1	0	—	—	—	—	—
SM-liiga totals			635	148	162	310	1,348	85	17	10	27	120
