= Niko Snellman =

Finnish ice hockey player

- Born: March 12, 1988 (age 38) Tampere, Finland
- Height: 6 ft 2 in (188 cm)
- Weight: 212 lb (96 kg; 15 st 2 lb)
- Position: Left wing
- Shot: Left
- Played for: Ilves
- NHL draft: 105th overall, 2006; Nashville Predators
- Playing career: 2009–2012

Niko Snellman (born March 12, 1988) is a Finnish former professional ice hockey player. He was drafted 105th overall by the Nashville Predators in the 2006 NHL entry draft.

Snellman played eleven games in the SM-liiga for Ilves during the 2009–10 SM-liiga season, registering one assist. He also played in Mestis for Lempäälän Kisa, Kiekko-Laser and Jokipojat.

== Career statistics ==
| | | | Regular season | | | | | Playoffs |
| Season | Team | League | GP | G | A | Pts | PIM | GP | G | A | Pts | PIM |
|---|---|---|---|---|---|---|---|---|---|---|---|---|
| 2004–05 | Ilves | FIN U18 | 22 | 5 | 1 | 6 | 44 | 5 | 0 | 0 | 0 | 2 |
| 2005–06 | Ilves | FIN U18 | 6 | 3 | 8 | 11 | 28 | 6 | 2 | 5 | 7 | 64 |
| 2005–06 | Ilves | FIN U20 | 23 | 4 | 4 | 8 | 74 | 3 | 0 | 0 | 0 | 4 |
| 2006–07 | Regina Pats | WHL | 32 | 5 | 5 | 10 | 65 | — | — | — | — | — |
| 2007–08 | Ilves | FIN U20 | 31 | 5 | 11 | 16 | 137 | 1 | 0 | 0 | 0 | 0 |
| 2007–08 | Ilves | SM-liiga | — | — | — | — | — | 1 | 0 | 1 | 1 | 0 |
| 2008–09 | Ilves | FIN U20 | 5 | 0 | 0 | 0 | 8 | — | — | — | — | — |
| 2008–09 | LeKi | Mestis | 11 | 1 | 0 | 1 | 27 | 2 | 0 | 0 | 0 | 4 |
| 2009–10 | Ilves | FIN U20 | 1 | 0 | 1 | 1 | 0 | — | — | — | — | — |
| 2009–10 | Ilves | SM-liiga | 11 | 0 | 1 | 1 | 49 | — | — | — | — | — |
| 2009–10 | LeKi | Mestis | 17 | 3 | 4 | 7 | 69 | — | — | — | — | — |
| 2010–11 | Kiekko–Laser | Mestis | 5 | 0 | 0 | 0 | 6 | — | — | — | — | — |
| 2011–12 | Jokipojat | Mestis | 15 | 1 | 2 | 3 | 37 | — | — | — | — | — |
| SM-liiga totals | | | 11 | 0 | 1 | 1 | 49 | 1 | 0 | 1 | 1 | 0 |
| Mestis totals | | | 48 | 5 | 6 | 11 | 139 | 2 | 0 | 0 | 0 | 4 |
