= Jyri Junnila =

Finnish ice hockey player

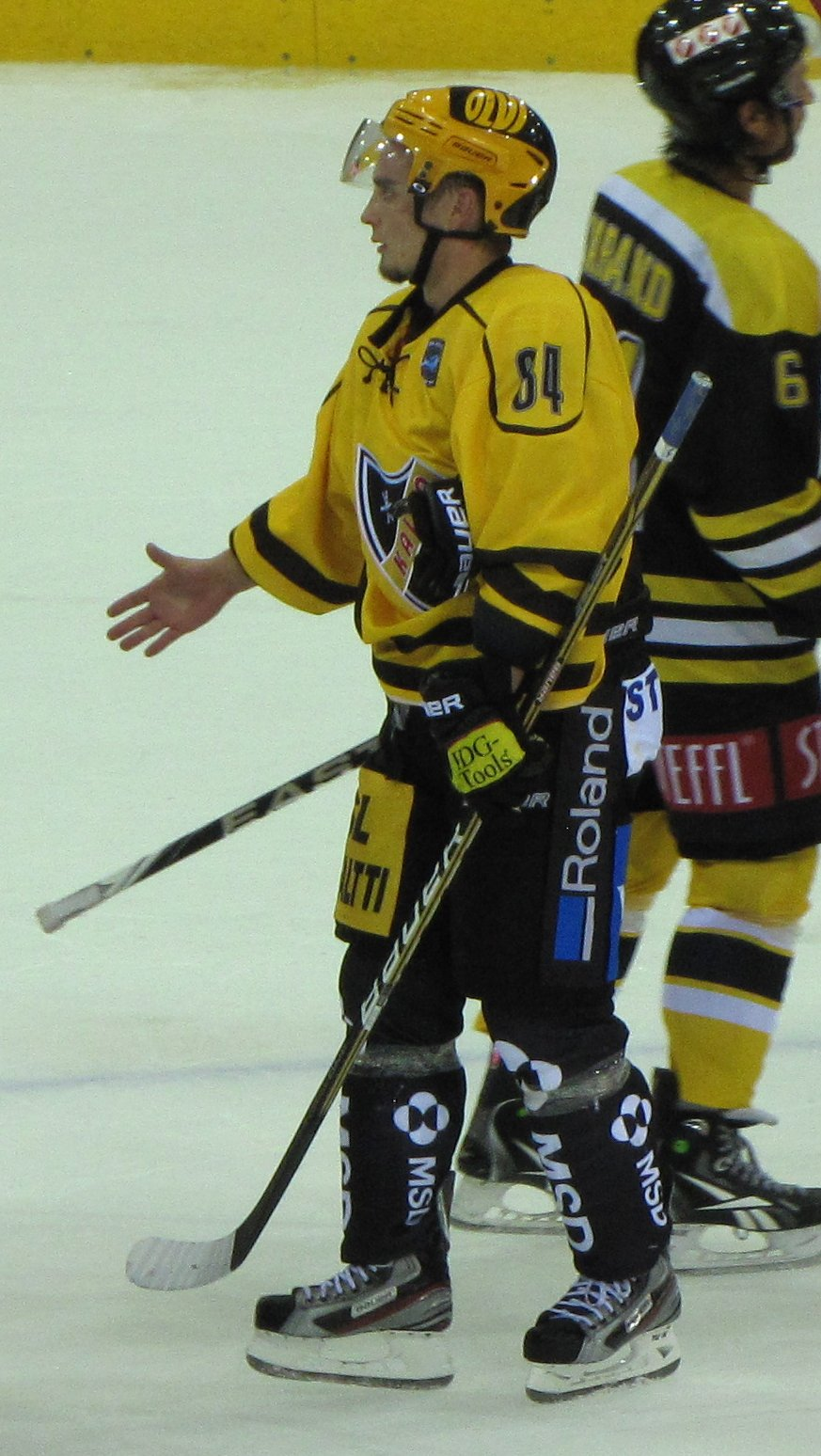
- Born: April 7, 1984 (age 42) Raahe, Finland
- Height: 5 ft 8 in (173 cm)
- Weight: 183 lb (83 kg; 13 st 1 lb)
- Position: Right wing
- Shoots: Right
- Liiga team Former teams: KalPa; Oulun Kärpät; Tappara; SaiPa; Kärpät
- NHL draft: Undrafted
- Playing career: 2003–present

Jyri Junnila (born April 7, 1984) is a Finnish professional ice hockey right wing who is currently playing for KalPa in the Finnish Liiga. He previously played for Kärpät in the Finnish Liiga.

On 30 January 2019, Junnila joined KalPa for the completion of the 2018–19 season.

== Career statistics ==
| | | | Regular season | | | | | Playoffs |
| Season | Team | League | GP | G | A | Pts | PIM | GP | G | A | Pts | PIM |
|---|---|---|---|---|---|---|---|---|---|---|---|---|
| 2000–01 | Oulun Kärpät U18 | U18 SM-sarja | 20 | 17 | 9 | 26 | 6 | 2 | 0 | 1 | 1 | 0 |
| 2001–02 | Oulun Kärpät U18 | U18 SM-sarja | 6 | 2 | 5 | 7 | 0 | 2 | 1 | 0 | 1 | 0 |
| 2001–02 | Oulun Kärpät U20 | U20 SM-liiga | 26 | 7 | 7 | 14 | 0 | 2 | 0 | 0 | 0 | 0 |
| 2002–03 | Oulun Kärpät U20 | U20 SM-liiga | 34 | 9 | 16 | 25 | 8 | 4 | 1 | 1 | 2 | 0 |
| 2002–03 | Oulun Kärpät | SM-liiga | — | — | — | — | — | 3 | 0 | 0 | 0 | 0 |
| 2003–04 | Oulun Kärpät U20 | U20 SM-liiga | 31 | 8 | 19 | 27 | 26 | 5 | 1 | 1 | 2 | 2 |
| 2003–04 | Oulun Kärpät | SM-liiga | 9 | 2 | 0 | 2 | 0 | 2 | 0 | 0 | 0 | 0 |
| 2003–04 | Suomi U20 | Mestis | 4 | 2 | 0 | 2 | 0 | — | — | — | — | — |
| 2004–05 | Hokki | Mestis | 42 | 9 | 8 | 17 | 14 | 4 | 1 | 1 | 2 | 2 |
| 2005–06 | Oulun Kärpät | SM-liiga | 43 | 3 | 5 | 8 | 6 | — | — | — | — | — |
| 2006–07 | Oulun Kärpät | SM-liiga | 53 | 3 | 2 | 5 | 6 | 1 | 0 | 0 | 0 | 0 |
| 2007–08 | KalPa | SM-liiga | 50 | 11 | 15 | 26 | 14 | — | — | — | — | — |
| 2008–09 | KalPa | SM-liiga | 58 | 9 | 12 | 21 | 20 | 12 | 2 | 1 | 3 | 2 |
| 2009–10 | Tappara | SM-liiga | 58 | 9 | 10 | 19 | 14 | 9 | 1 | 2 | 3 | 2 |
| 2010–11 | Kiekko-Laser | Mestis | 20 | 14 | 7 | 21 | 14 | — | — | — | — | — |
| 2010–11 | SaiPa | SM-liiga | 11 | 3 | 2 | 5 | 2 | — | — | — | — | — |
| 2010–11 | KalPa | SM-liiga | 16 | 1 | 1 | 2 | 4 | 3 | 0 | 0 | 0 | 0 |
| 2011–12 | KalPa | SM-liiga | 40 | 6 | 12 | 18 | 10 | 6 | 0 | 1 | 1 | 0 |
| 2012–13 | KalPa | SM-liiga | 55 | 2 | 8 | 10 | 8 | 2 | 0 | 0 | 0 | 0 |
| 2013–14 | KalPa | Liiga | 35 | 2 | 2 | 4 | 10 | — | — | — | — | — |
| 2014–15 | KalPa | Liiga | 60 | 3 | 1 | 4 | 12 | 6 | 0 | 0 | 0 | 0 |
| 2015–16 | KalPa | Liiga | 34 | 0 | 5 | 5 | 4 | 3 | 0 | 0 | 0 | 0 |
| 2016–17 | KalPa | Liiga | 51 | 9 | 12 | 21 | 8 | 18 | 4 | 3 | 7 | 6 |
| 2017–18 | Oulun Kärpät | Liiga | 55 | 5 | 5 | 10 | 6 | 7 | 0 | 0 | 0 | 2 |
| 2018–19 | Oulun Kärpät | Liiga | 17 | 1 | 1 | 2 | 2 | — | — | — | — | — |
| 2018–19 | KalPa | Liiga | 16 | 2 | 2 | 4 | 25 | — | — | — | — | — |
| 2019–20 | Hokki | Mestis | 26 | 1 | 4 | 5 | 16 | — | — | — | — | — |
| Liiga totals | | | 661 | 71 | 95 | 166 | 151 | 72 | 7 | 7 | 14 | 12 |
