= Yevgeni Fofanov =

Russian ice hockey winger

- Born: July 16, 1989 (age 35); Kostomuksha, Russian SFSR, Soviet Union
- Height: 5 ft 9 in (175 cm)
- Weight: 172 lb (78 kg; 12 st 4 lb)
- Position: Winger
- Shot: Left
- team: retired
- Playing career: 2010–2019

Yevgeni Fofanov (born July 16, 1989) is a Russian professional ice hockey winger. He is currently a free agent having last played for IPK in Mestis.

Despite being Russian, Fofanov has to date spent his entire career in Finland. He began his career with Hokki in their junior setup in 2004 and made his debut for the senior team during the 2010–11 Mestis season. On September 11, 2014, he joined IPK of the Suomi-sarja, who were then promoted to Mestis two years later. He was released on September 9, 2019. Now he is U18 Couch at IPK. He has two children whose live with him and his wife in Iisalmen.
