= Matti Kaltiainen =

Finnish ice hockey player

- Born: April 30, 1982 (age 44) Espoo, Finland
- Height: 6 ft 2 in (188 cm)
- Weight: 187 lb (85 kg; 13 st 5 lb)
- Position: Goaltender
- Caught: Left
- Played for: Boston College; Haukat; Kiekko-Vantaa; Espoo Blues; Porin Ässät
- NHL draft: 111th overall, 2001; Boston Bruins
- Playing career: 2005–2008

Matti Kaltiainen (born 30 April 1982 in Espoo, Finland) is a Finnish former professional ice hockey goaltender.

== Career ==
Kaltiainen played his junior hockey in Finland in the farm system of his hometown club, the Espoo Blues. While he was called up to the top division in both the 2000 and 2001 seasons, he didn't appear in any games for the Blues. However, his performance in juniors did bring him enough notoriety to be selected by the Boston Bruins in the 2001 NHL entry draft. The following fall, Kaltiainen began attending Boston College and joined an ice hockey program that had just won its first national championship in 52 years. He split time in goal with Tim Kelleher as a freshman.

Beginning with his sophomore year, Kaltiainen was the starting goaltender for the program and helped the club win three consecutive Hockey East titles. He had his best performance as a junior with 27 wins and finished second in the nation with a 1.76 goals against average. That season Kaltiainen helped BC reach the frozen four but the Eagles fell to conference rival Maine. During his senior season, Kaltiainen had to again share the net, this time with star recruit and first-round draft pick Cory Schneider. Despite possessing better numbers over the course of the season, Kaltiainen was displaced by Schneider in the conference tournament and spent most of his last weeks with the team on the bench. Kaltiainen did get in goal for the team's final game in the NCAA tournament but that came after BC was down 6–3. While the end may have been disappointing, Kaltiainen ended his tenure with the Eagles as the program's all-time leader in goals against average, a distinction he still holds as of 2022.

After graduating with a degree in Human Development, Kaltiainen returned to Finland to begin his professional career. He appeared in games for three different clubs that year but ended up spending the bulk of his time with the Espoo Blues. Despite a good performance with the cub, Kaltiainen was not retained and moved on to Porin Ässät the following year. Kaltiainen's numbers plummeted and his new team ended up second-last in league standings. He dropped down to the second level of Finnish hockey and, after his numbers failed to improve, retired from the sport.

With his playing days behind him, Kaltiainen returned to college and enrolled at the Metropolia University of Applied Sciences in Helsinki. While pursuing an engineering degree, Kaltiainen began working as a technical consultant for OpenText and split his time between the two enterprises. He received his bachelor's in 2015 and began working for Mandatum a year later. As of 2022 he is a System Manager in the Life Insurance department.

== Career statistics ==
=== Regular season and playoffs ===
			Regular season										Playoffs
Season	Team	League	GP	W	L	T	MIN	GA	SO	GAA	SV%	GP	W	L	MIN	GA	SO	GAA	SV%
2001–02	Boston College	Hockey East	18	8	10	0	1080	48	0	2.67	.901	—	—	—	—	—	—	—	—
2002–03	Boston College	Hockey East	30	18	9	3	1843	68	1	2.21	.903	—	—	—	—	—	—	—	—
2003–04	Boston College	Hockey East	38	27	7	4	2280	67	4	1.76	.907	—	—	—	—	—	—	—	—
2004–05	Boston College	Hockey East	24	13	6	3	1369	41	2	1.80	.921	—	—	—	—	—	—	—	—
2005–06	Haukat	Mestis	1	—	—	—	58	2	0	2.07	.950	—	—	—	—	—	—	—	—
2005–06	Kiekko-Vantaa	Mestis	2	—	—	—	123	—	0	3.41	.915	—	—	—	—	—	—	—	—
2005–06	Espoo Blues	SM-liiga	15	3	5	2	750	29	0	2.32	.920	9	—	—	—	—	—	—	—
2006–07	Porin Ässät	SM-liiga	26	3	20	1	1278	78	0	3.66	.910	—	—	—	—	—	—	—	—
2007–08	Kiekko-Vantaa	Mestis	36	—	—	—	—	—	—	3.67	.893	—	—	—	—	—	—	—	—
NCAA totals			110	66	32	10	6,572	224	7	2.05	.908	—	—	—	—	—	—	—	—
SM-liiga totals			41	6	25	3	2,028	107	0	3.17	—	9	—	—	—	—	—	—	—

== Awards and honors ==
Award	Year
All-Hockey East Second Team	2003–04
