= Niklas Sirén =

Finnish ice hockey player

- Born: 17 July 1989 (age 36) Hämeenlinna, Finland
- Height: 5 ft 9 in (175 cm)
- Weight: 170 lb (77 kg; 12 st 2 lb)
- Position: Forward
- Shoots: Left
- Liiga team Former teams: HIFK; KooKoo; HIFK; Imatran Ketterä; SaPKo; Hokki
- NHL draft: Undrafted
- Playing career: 2007–present

Niklas Sirén (born 17 July 1989) is a Finnish professional ice hockey player. He is currently playing for Hermes of the Finnish Suomi-sarja.

Sirén made his Liiga debut playing with HIFK during the 2007–08 Liiga season.
