= Mikko Rämö =

Finnish ice hockey player

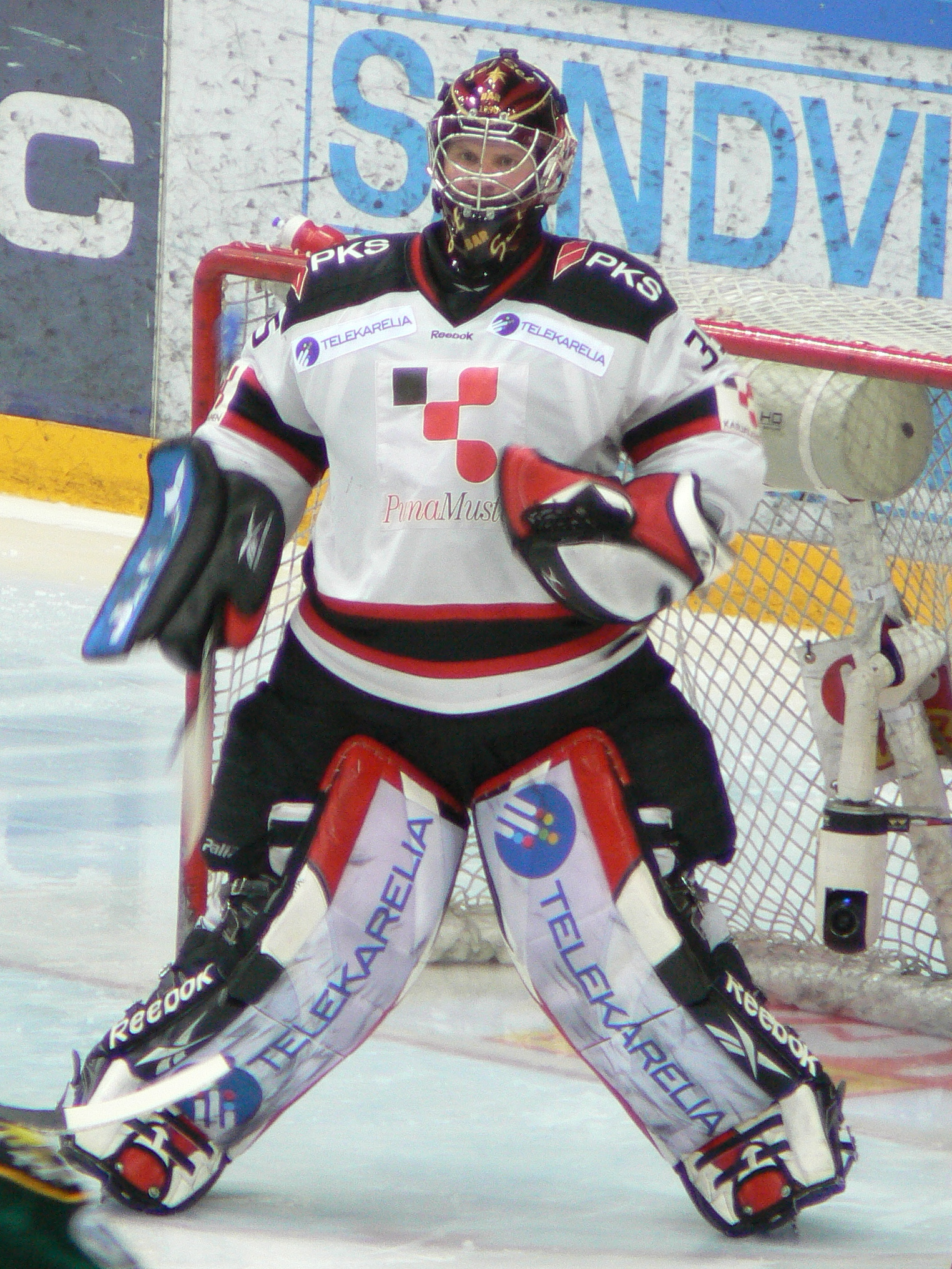
- Rämö Mikko Jokipojat 2010 1
- Born: July 20, 1980 (age 46) Lahti, Finland
- Height: 6 ft 0 in (183 cm)
- Weight: 187 lb (85 kg; 13 st 5 lb)
- Position: Goaltender
- Catches: Left
- team Former teams: Free agent Pelicans; HPK; Amur Khabarovsk; Vityaz Chekhov; Jokerit; HIFK; Mora IK; EHC Black Wings Linz
- Playing career: 2001–present

Mikko Rämö (born July 27, 1980) is a Finnish professional ice hockey goaltender. He is currently a free agent having last played for Tölzer Löwen in DEL2.

He is not related to fellow ex-Pelicans goaltender Karri Rämö.

== Playing career ==
Rämö came through the youth setup of Kiekkoreipas, a Lahti-based club, before joined the Lahti Pelicans, where he made his debut his debut in Finland's top flight SM-liiga during the 2001–02 campaign.

After three seasons with Pelicans in the SM-liiga, Rämö signed with HPK for the 2003–04 season. He signed with Russian Vityaz Chekhov in 2005, but was released in November and signed a new contract with Jokerit. Rämö was traded to HIFK in January 2006 for Tom Askey.

At the start of the 2006–07 season, Rämö signed with Mora IK of the Swedish Elitserien where he was fighting out the starting spot with fellow Finn Juha Pitkämäki.

In the 2007–08 season, he played first for Kajaanin Hokki in Finland (Mestis) and in December 2007 moved VEU Feldkirch of Austria's Nationalliga. He signed a contract for the 2008–09 season in Feldkirch, Vorarlberg, and had a further career change when he joined EHC Black Wings Linz on 29 January 2009.

He was able to secure a contract with the Mestis team Jokipojat in June 2009 and returned to his native country for the campaign of 2009–10. After one season with Jokipojat, he headed to fellow Mestis side KooKoo in 2010, where he played until the end of the 2014–15 season.

Rämö then joined EC Bad Nauheim of the German second-tier league DEL2 for the 2015–16 campaign. He received DEL2 Goaltender of the Year honors that season.

== Career statistics ==
=== Regular season ===
Season	Team	League	GP	W	L	T	MIN	GA	SO	GAA	Sv%
2005–06	Jokerit	SM-liiga	7	1	4	2	368.42	24	0	3.91	89,87%

=== Regular season & Playoffs ===
Season	Team	League	GP	MIN	GA	SOG	SVS	GAA	Sv%
2007–08	VEU Feldkirch	Austrian National League	24	1444	57	749	692	2.38	92.39%
