= Jesse Väkelä =

Finnish ice hockey player

- Born: 9 July 1995 (age 29); Vaasa, Finland
- Height: 6 ft 0 in (183 cm)
- Weight: 187 lb (85 kg; 13 st 5 lb)
- Position: Defense
- Shoots: Right
- Fin-4 team Former teams: KoMu HT; Peliitat Heinola; Sport; Hokki
- NHL draft: Undrafted
- Playing career: 2014–present

Jesse Väkelä (born 9 July 1995) is a Finnish professional ice hockey player for KoMu HT of the 2. Divisioona.

He previously played for Hokki of the Finnish Mestis.

Väkelä made his Liiga debut playing with Vaasan Sport during the 2014-15 Liiga season.
