= 2013–14 Suomi-sarja season =

The 2013–14 Suomi-sarja season was the 15th season of the Suomi-sarja, the third level of ice hockey in Finland. 14 teams participated in the league, and KeuPa HT won the championship. They were promoted to the Mestis league for 2014–15 and Raahe-Kiekko were relegated to II-divisioona. They were replaced by KaKiPo and IPK.

== Regular season ==
Pl.		GP	W	OTW	OTL	L	Goals	Pts
1.	RoKi	38	22	5	5	6	193:115	81
2.	S-Kiekko	38	24	2	3	9	172:109	79
3.	KOOVEE	38	20	4	3	11	159:110	71
4.	BeWe TuusKi	38	20	3	2	13	167:144	68
5.	Imatran Ketterä	38	19	3	3	13	163:133	66
6.	FPS	38	18	4	3	13	165:140	65
7.	KeuPa HT	38	20	0	3	15	165:141	63
8.	JHT	38	18	4	1	15	142:117	63
9.	PYRY	38	17	2	5	14	162:144	60
10.	Kokkolan Hermes	38	12	5	6	15	136:144	52
11.	Hydraulic Oilers	38	13	4	4	17	132:164	51
12.	Waasa Red Ducks	38	8	3	1	26	111:187	31
13.	HC Satakunta	38	7	2	2	27	122:208	27
14.	Raahe-Kiekko	38	6	1	1	30	87:220	21

== Playoffs ==
Quarter-finals
RoKi	0
KeuPa HT	2
S-Kiekko	1
JHT	2
KOOVEE	1
FPS	2
BeWe TuusKi	2
Imatran Ketterä	1

Semi-finals
KeuPa HT	2
BeWe TuusKi	0
FPS	2
JHT	0

Final
KeuPa HT	3
FPS	1

== 2013-14 Mestis qualification ==
Pl.	GP	W	OTW	OTL	L	Goals	Pts
1.	0	0	0	0	0	0:0	0
3.	0	0	0	0	0	0:0	0
3.	0	0	0	0	0	0:0	0
4.	0	0	0	0	0	0:0	0

== Play-out ==
=== 1st round ===
- Nokian PYRY - Raahe-Kiekko 2:0 (6:2, 13:1)
- HC Satakunta - Kokkolan Hermes 2:1 (4:2, 3:4 OT, 3:2)
- Waasa Red Ducks - Hydraulic Oilers 2:0 (6:4, 1:0)

=== 2nd round ===
Pl.		GP	W	OTW	OTL	L	Goals	Pts
1.	Hydraulic Oilers	2	1	1	0	0	7:5	5
2.	Raahe-Kiekko	2	1	0	0	1	9:8	3
3.	Kokkolan Hermes	2	0	0	1	1	8:11	1

=== 3rd round ===
==== Group 1 ====
Pl.		GP	W	OTW	OTL	L	Goals	Pts
1.	KaKiPo	4	4	0	0	0	28:14	12
2.	Porvoo Hunters	4	2	0	0	2	20:20	6
3.	Raahe-Kiekko	4	0	0	0	4	12:26	0

==== Group 2 ====
Pl.		GP	W	OTW	OTL	L	Goals	Pts
1.	IPK	4	3	0	0	1	24:7	9
2.	Kokkolan Hermes	4	2	0	0	2	11:16	6
3.	Muik Hockey	4	1	0	0	3	9:21	3
