= Joona Karevaara =

Finnish ice hockey player

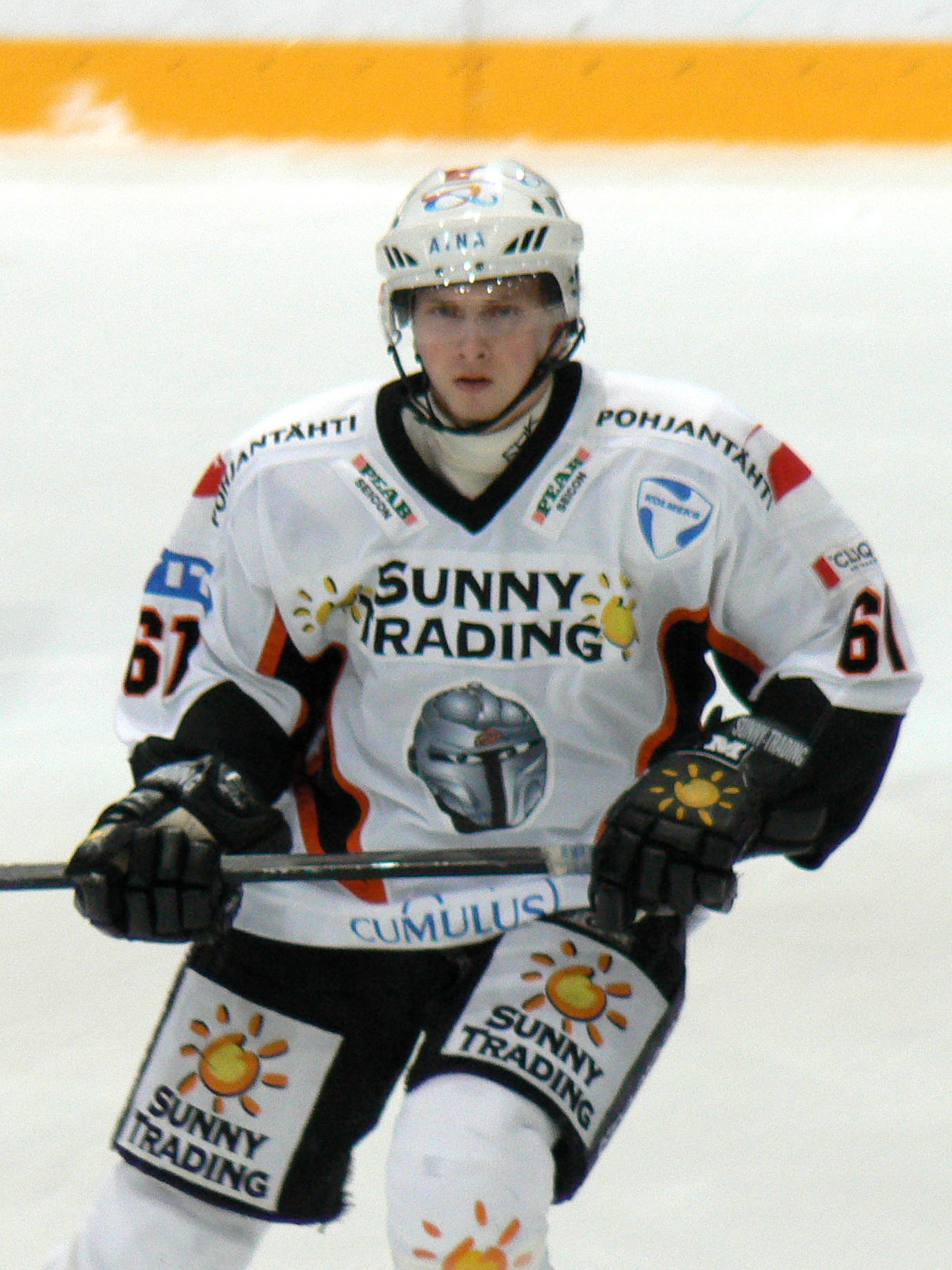
- Joona Karevaara
- Born: 26 August 1987 (age 37); Hämeenlinna, Finland
- Height: 187 cm (6 ft 2 in)
- Weight: 89 kg (196 lb; 14 st 0 lb)
- Position: Winger
- Shoots: Right
- DEL2 team Former teams: ESV Kaufbeuren; HPK
- Playing career: 2005–present

Joona Karevaara is a Finnish professional ice hockey forward who currently plays for Jokipojat of Mestis. He also used to play for HPK of the SM-liiga.
