= 2004–05 Mestis season =

2004–05 Mestis
- League: Mestis
- Sport: Ice hockey
- Duration: September 2004 – April 2005
- Number of teams: 12

Regular season
- Best record: KalPa
- Runners-up: Jukurit
- Promoted to SM-liiga: KalPa

Playoffs
- Finals champions: KalPa
- Runners-up: Sport

Mestis seasons
- ← 2003–04 2005–06 →

The 2004–05 Mestis season was the fifth season of the Mestis, the second level of ice hockey in Finland. 12 teams participated in the league, and KalPa won the championship.

== Standings ==
Rank	Team	GP	W	OTW	T/OTL	L	GF	GA	Diff	Pts
1.	KalPa	44	34	2	3	5	182	75	+107	75
2.	Jukurit	44	28	3	5	8	140	59	+81	67
3.	Hokki	44	24	3	6	11	136	118	+18	60
4.	Sport	44	23	1	6	14	153	108	+45	54
5.	Hermes	44	18	3	5	18	124	130	−6	47
6.	TUTO Hockey	44	16	1	10	17	123	131	−8	44
7.	Salamat	44	17	2	6	19	107	128	−21	44
8.	Kiekko-Vantaa	44	14	4	7	19	116	122	−6	43
9.	Haukat	44	15	1	6	22	124	151	−27	38
10.	KooKoo	44	10	3	9	22	100	137	−37	35
11.	Jokipojat	44	11	1	5	27	117	178	−61	29
12.	FPS	44	4	2	6	32	81	166	−85	18

== Playoffs ==
Quarterfinals
1	KalPa	3
8	Kiekko-Vantaa	0
2	Jukurit	3
7	Salamat	0
3	Hokki	1
6	TUTO Hockey	3
4	Sport	3
5	Hermes	0

Semifinals
1	KalPa	3
6	TUTO Hockey	0
2	Jukurit	2
4	Sport	3

Finals
1	KalPa	3
4	Sport	0
Third place
2	Jukurit	0
6	TUTO Hockey	1

== Qualification ==
Rank	Team	GP	W	OTW	T	OTL	L	GF	GA	Diff	Pts
1.	FPS	6	4	0	1	0	1	27	15	+7	9
2.	Jokipojat	6	3	0	1	0	2	22	18	+4	7
3.	SHT	6	2	0	1	0	3	19	23	−4	5
4.	HeKi	6	1	0	1	0	4	29	23	−7	3

No teams were relegated as FPS and Jokipojat retained their places in Mestis.
