= Jakub Kindl =

Czech ice hockey player (born 1987)

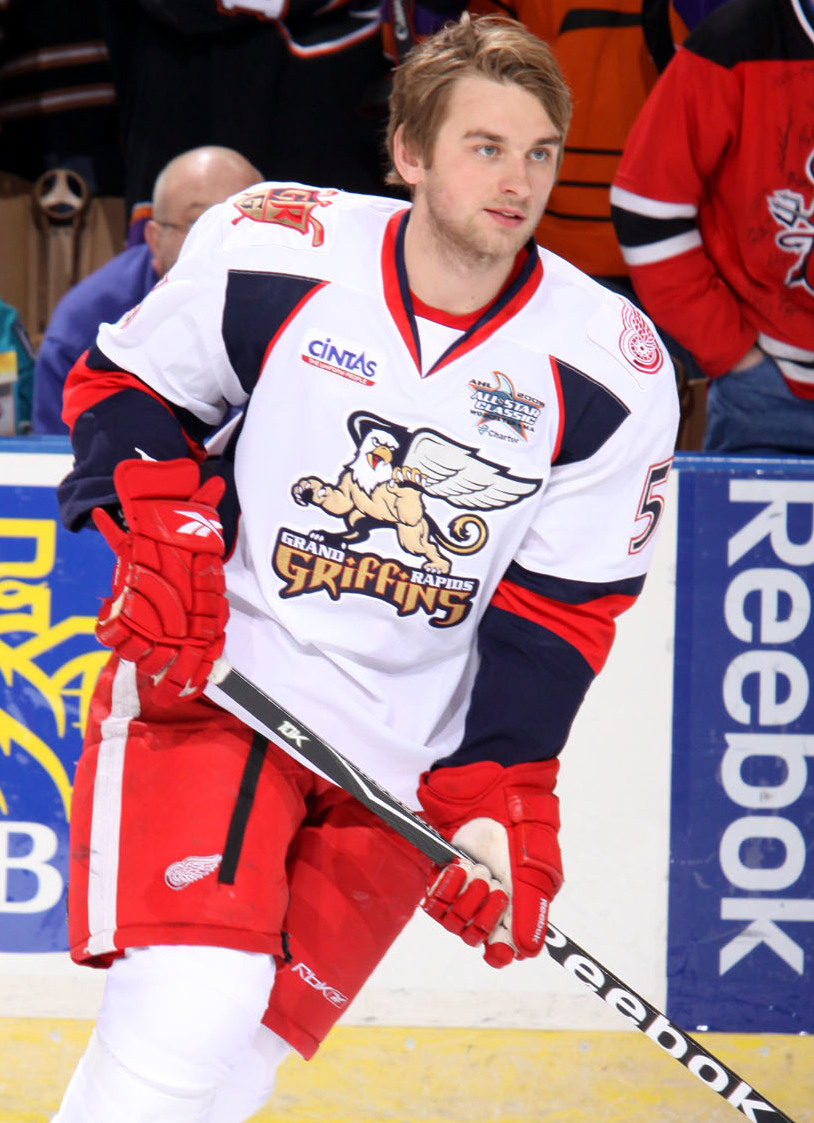
- Kindl in 2009
- Born: 10 February 1987 (age 39) Šumperk, Czechoslovakia
- Height: 6 ft 3 in (191 cm)
- Weight: 216 lb (98 kg; 15 st 6 lb)
- Position: Defence
- Shoots: Left
- Mestis team Former teams: Kiekko-Pojat: LTC Pardubice; Detroit Red Wings; Florida Panthers; HC Plzeň; Kölner Haie; Storhamar Hockey
- National team: Czech Republic
- NHL draft: 19th overall, 2005; Detroit Red Wings
- Playing career: 2008–present

Jakub Kindl (born 10 February 1987) is a Czech professional ice hockey defenceman who is currently playing for Kiekko-Pojat of Mestis, the second tier of professional hockey in Finland. He previously played in the National Hockey League (NHL) with the Detroit Red Wings and Florida Panthers.

== Playing career ==
As a youth, Kindl played in the 2001 Quebec International Pee-Wee Hockey Tournament with a team from Chomutov.

Kindl played junior hockey for the Kitchener Rangers of the OHL and then for the Grand Rapids Griffins of the American Hockey League. Kindl was drafted 19th overall by the Detroit Red Wings in the 2005 NHL Draft.

During the 2005–06 season, Kindl played in three games for Grand Rapids, where he recorded one assist. During the 2007–08 season, he played in 75 games for Grand Rapids.

Kindl made his NHL debut with the Red Wings during the 2009–10 NHL season. Called up as an injury replacement, he eventually appeared in three games before returning to Grand Rapids. Kindl scored his first career NHL goal on 20 January 2011 against Jaroslav Halák of the St. Louis Blues.

On 29 June 2013, Kindl signed a four-year, $9.6 million contract extension with the Detroit Red Wings.

On 14 February 2015, the Red Wings assigned Kindl to the Grand Rapids Griffins for a conditioning assignment. Kindl has not played for the Red Wings since suffering an elbow injury on 27 December 2014. On 20 February 2015, the Red Wings recalled Kindl from his conditioning assignment with the Griffins. During his condition assignment, Kindl recorded one goal, and a plus-two rating in back-to-back wins for the Griffins.

On 9 January 2016, Kindl was placed on waivers and later assigned to the Grand Rapids Griffins. Prior to being placed on waivers, he played in 23 games with the Red Wings, recording two goals and three assists. His plus-3 rating in overtime leads the Wings this season. On 4 February, Kindl was recalled by the Red Wings. Prior to being recalled by the Red Wings, Kindl recorded two goals and one assist in nine games for the Griffins since he was assigned on 11 January. He was again assigned to the Griffins on 23 February.

On 27 February 2016, Kindl was traded by the Red Wings to the Florida Panthers in exchange for a sixth-round pick in the 2017 NHL Draft.

At the conclusion of his contract with the Panthers, Kindl left the NHL as a free agent and later returned to his homeland in signing a one-year deal with HC Plzeň of the Czech Extraliga on 18 October 2017.

After two seasons with Plzeň, Kindl left at the conclusion of his contract continuing his European career in Germany by agreeing to a one-year contract with Kölner Haie of the DEL on 5 July 2019.

On 2 December 2022, he signed for Storhamar Hockey in Fjordkraft-ligaen for the remainder of the 2022/23 season. He later extended his contract until the 2023–24 season.

After not playing for most of 2024–25, Kindl signed on 5 February 2025 to play the remainder of the season with Kiekko-Pojat in Mestis, the second tier of professional hockey in Finland.

== International play ==
Kindl represented the Czech Republic at the 2014 IIHF World Championship, where he recorded one goal and two assists in ten games.

== Career statistics ==
=== Regular season and playoffs ===
			Regular season					Playoffs
Season	Team	League	GP	G	A	Pts	PIM	GP	G	A	Pts	PIM
2001–02	HC IPB Pojišťovna Pardubice	CZE U18	23	4	10	14	30	6	1	1	2	8
2001–02	HC IPB Pojišťovna Pardubice	CZE U20	19	1	1	2	20	—	—	—	—	—
2002–03	HC ČSOB Pojišťovna Pardubice	CZE U18	3	0	3	3	10	—	—	—	—	—
2002–03	HC ČSOB Pojišťovna Pardubice	CZE U20	16	0	1	1	22	11	0	2	2	26
2002–03	HC ČSOB Pojišťovna Pardubice	ELH	1	0	0	0	0	—	—	—	—	—
2003–04	HC Moeller Pardubice	CZE U18	2	0	1	1	6	—	—	—	—	—
2003–04	HC Moeller Pardubice	CZE U20	48	4	14	18	108	—	—	—	—	—
2003–04	HC VCES Hradec Králové	CZE.2	1	0	0	0	0	1	0	0	0	0
2004–05	Kitchener Rangers	OHL	62	3	11	14	92	12	0	0	0	22
2005–06	Kitchener Rangers	OHL	60	12	46	58	112	5	1	0	1	10
2005–06	Grand Rapids Griffins	AHL	3	0	1	1	2	—	—	—	—	—
2006–07	Kitchener Rangers	OHL	54	11	44	55	142	9	2	9	11	8
2006–07	Grand Rapids Griffins	AHL	—	—	—	—	—	7	0	2	2	0
2007–08	Grand Rapids Griffins	AHL	75	3	14	17	82	—	—	—	—	—
2008–09	Grand Rapids Griffins	AHL	78	6	27	33	76	10	2	1	3	2
2009–10	Grand Rapids Griffins	AHL	73	3	30	33	59	—	—	—	—	—
2009–10	Detroit Red Wings	NHL	3	0	0	0	0	—	—	—	—	—
2010–11	Detroit Red Wings	NHL	48	2	2	4	36	—	—	—	—	—
2010–11	Grand Rapids Griffins	AHL	8	1	4	5	6	—	—	—	—	—
2011–12	Detroit Red Wings	NHL	55	1	12	13	25	—	—	—	—	—
2012–13	HC ČSOB Pojišťovna Pardubice	ELH	27	1	10	11	26	—	—	—	—	—
2012–13	Detroit Red Wings	NHL	41	4	9	13	28	14	1	4	5	10
2013–14	Detroit Red Wings	NHL	66	2	17	19	24	4	0	0	0	2
2014–15	Grand Rapids Griffins	AHL	2	1	0	1	2	—	—	—	—	—
2014–15	Detroit Red Wings	NHL	35	5	8	13	22	1	0	0	0	0
2015–16	Detroit Red Wings	NHL	25	2	4	6	14	—	—	—	—	—
2015–16	Grand Rapids Griffins	AHL	10	3	1	4	12	—	—	—	—	—
2015–16	Florida Panthers	NHL	19	0	2	2	4	1	0	0	0	0
2016–17	Springfield Thunderbirds	AHL	13	1	6	7	16	—	—	—	—	—
2016–17	Florida Panthers	NHL	39	0	4	4	28	—	—	—	—	—
2017–18	HC Škoda Plzeň	ELH	30	1	3	4	32	7	1	2	3	2
2018–19	HC Škoda Plzeň	ELH	26	2	8	10	36	—	—	—	—	—
2019–20	Kölner Haie	DEL	48	1	9	10	22	—	—	—	—	—
2021–22	HC Škoda Plzeň	ELH	43	3	7	10	32	—	—	—	—	—
2022–23	Storhamar Hockey	FKL	19	2	12	14	24	17	0	5	5	6
2023–24	Storhamar Hockey	EHL	26	2	12	14	6	14	1	5	6	18
ELH totals			84	4	21	25	94	7	1	2	3	2
NHL totals			331	16	58	74	181	20	1	4	5	12
DEL totals			48	1	9	10	22	—	—	—	—	—
FKL / EHL totals			45	4	24	28	30	31	1	10	11	24

=== International ===
Year	Team	Event	Result	GP	G	A	Pts	PIM
2006	Czech Republic	WJC	8th	6	0	1	1	10
2007	Czech Republic	WJC	5th	6	0	4	4	8
2014	Czech Republic	WC	4th	10	1	2	3	6
Junior totals				12	0	5	5	18
Senior totals				10	1	2	3	6

Awards and achievements
Preceded by Niklas Kronwall	Detroit Red Wings first-round draft pick 2005	Succeeded by Brendan Smith
