= 2009–10 Mestis season =

2009–10 Mestis
- League: Mestis
- Sport: Ice hockey
- Duration: September 2009 – April 2010
- Number of teams: 12

Regular season
- Best record: KooKoo
- Runners-up: Jokipojat
- Relegated to Suomi-sarja: RoKi

Playoffs
- Finals champions: Jokipojat
- Runners-up: D Team

Mestis seasons
- ← 2008–09 2010–11 →

The 2009–10 Mestis season was the 10th season of the Mestis, the second level of ice hockey in Finland. 12 teams participated in the league, and Jokipojat won the championship.

== Standings ==
Rank	Team	GP	W	OTW	OTL	L	GF	GA	Diff	Pts
1.	KooKoo	45	24	5	5	11	156	120	+36	87
2.	Jokipojat	45	23	5	5	12	173	128	+45	84
3.	LeKi	45	20	9	1	15	151	124	+27	79
4.	Sport	45	22	3	4	16	152	120	+32	76
5.	D Team	45	21	4	5	15	153	137	+16	76
6.	TUTO Hockey	45	21	3	5	15	153	145	+8	74
7.	Kiekko-Vantaa	45	21	2	5	17	141	141	0	72
8.	Jukurit	45	18	4	5	18	127	128	−1	67
9.	Hokki	45	18	4	5	18	133	146	−13	67
10.	SaPKo	45	15	4	4	22	129	158	−29	57
11.	HeKi	45	10	2	6	27	122	164	−42	40
12.	RoKi	45	8	5	1	31	117	191	−74	35

== Playoffs ==
Quarterfinals
1	KooKoo	3
8	Jukurit	1
2	Jokipojat	3
7	Kiekko-Vantaa	0
3	LeKi	3
6	TUTO Hockey	1
4	Sport	1
5	D Team	3

Semifinals
1	KooKoo	2
5	D Team	3
2	Jokipojat	3
3	LeKi	0

Finals
1	Jokipojat	3
5	D Team	0
Third place
1	KooKoo	1
3	LeKi	0

== Qualification ==
Rank	Team	GP	W	OTW	OTL	L	GF	GA	Diff	Pts
1.	HeKi	6	4	0	0	2	26	15	+11	12
2.	RoKi	6	3	1	0	2	31	21	+10	11
3.	Kiekko-Laser	6	3	0	2	1	23	24	−1	11
4.	KJT TuusKi	6	0	1	0	5	13	33	−20	2

Because RoKi and Kiekko-Laser were tied at points they faced for a decider in the home arena of RoKi due to RoKi having a better goal difference. Kiekko-Laser won the game 4-2 and RoKi was relegated.
