= 2003–04 Mestis season =

2003–04 Mestis
- League: Mestis
- Sport: Ice hockey
- Duration: September 2003 – April 2004
- Number of teams: 12

Regular season
- Best record: Jukurit
- Runners-up: KalPa
- Relegated to Suomi-sarja: Ahmat

Playoffs
- Finals champions: KalPa
- Runners-up: Jukurit

Mestis seasons
- ← 2002–03 2004–05 →

The 2003–04 Mestis season was the fourth season of the Mestis, the second level of ice hockey in Finland. 12 teams participated in the league, and KalPa won the championship.

== Standings ==
Rank	Team	Sp	W	OTW	T/OTL	L	GF	GA	Diff	Pts
1.	Jukurit	45	26	1	10	8	148	89	+59	64
2.	KalPa	45	26	2	7	10	168	97	+77	63
3.	Hermes	45	28	0	5	12	166	103	+63	61
4.	Sport	45	23	2	5	15	151	124	+27	55
5.	KooKoo	45	22	1	7	15	129	98	+31	53
6.	Hokki	45	17	6	5	17	132	129	3	51
7.	Salamat	45	19	1	6	19	139	147	−8	46
8.	Kiekko-Vantaa	45	15	3	8	19	128	136	−8	44
9.	Haukat	45	13	6	4	22	148	174	−26	42
10.	FPS	45	14	2	7	22	121	137	−16	39
11.	TUTO Hockey	45	13	0	9	23	121	162	−41	35
12.	Ahmat	45	3	2	6	34	103	257	−154	16

== Playoffs ==
Quarterfinals
1	Jukurit	3
8	Kiekko-Vantaa	2
2	KalPa	3
7	Salamat	0
3	Hermes	3
6	Hokki	1
4	Sport	2
5	KooKoo	3

Semifinals
1	Jukurit	3
5	KooKoo	0
2	KalPa	3
3	Hermes	0

Finals
1	Jukurit	2
2	KalPa	3
Third place
3	Hermes	1
5	KooKoo	0

== Qualification ==
Rank	Team	GP	W	OTW	T/OTL	L	GF	GA	Diff	Pts
1.	TUTO Hockey	6	3	2	1	1	23	10	13	11
2.	Jokipojat	6	4	0	1	1	25	12	+13	9
3.	Ahmat	6	2	0	1	3	16	20	−4	5
4.	Koo-Vee	6	0	0	1	5	10	32	−22	1

Ahmat were relegated to Suomi-sarja.
