= 2006–07 Mestis season =

2006–07 Mestis
- League: Mestis
- Sport: Ice hockey
- Duration: September 2006 – April 2007
- Number of teams: 12

Regular season
- Best record: Sport
- Runners-up: TUTO Hockey
- Relegated to Suomi-sarja: FPS & KOOVEE

Playoffs
- Finals champions: Hokki
- Runners-up: Jukurit

Mestis seasons
- ← 2005–06 2007–08 →

The 2006–07 Mestis season was the seventh season of the Mestis, the second level of ice hockey in Finland. 12 teams participated in the league, and Hokki won the championship.

== Standings ==
Rank	Team	GP	W	OTW	T	OTL	L	GF	GA	Diff	Pts
1.	Sport	45	30	2	3	1	9	195	105	+90	68
2.	TUTO Hockey	45	29	2	3	2	9	171	93	+78	67
3.	Jukurit	45	29	1	2	3	10	198	110	+88	65
4.	Hokki	45	25	3	4	1	11	175	126	+49	63
5.	KooKoo	45	24	1	8	1	11	174	131	+43	59
6.	Jokipojat	45	22	1	3	1	18	151	137	+14	50
7.	HeKi	45	14	2	4	2	23	124	151	−27	38
8.	Kiekko-Vantaa	45	16	2	1	0	26	142	188	−46	37
9.	SaPKo	45	12	1	2	5	25	121	171	−50	33
10.	Salamat	45	14	0	5	0	26	127	183	−56	33
11.	KOOVEE	45	9	2	3	1	30	133	227	−94	26
12.	FPS	45	9	0	2	0	34	102	183	−81	20

== Playoffs ==
Quarterfinals
1	Sport	3
8	Kiekko-Vantaa	0
2	TUTO Hockey	3
7	HeKi	0
3	Jukurit	3
6	Jokipojat	0
4	Hokki	3
5	KooKoo	2

Semifinals
1	Sport	1
4	Hokki	3
2	TUTO Hockey	1
3	Jukurit	3

Finals
3	Jukurit	0
4	Hokki	3
Third place
1	Sport	1
2	TUTO Hockey	0

== Mestis Qualification ==
The bottom four themes and the losers from the quarter-finals faced each other in the relegation playouts. Each stage consisted of best-of-5 series with the loser moving to the next round. The two losers from relegation round 2 faced the best 2 teams from Suomi-sarja.

Relegation Round 1			Relegation Round 2			To the relegation tournament
8	Kiekko-Vantaa	3
9	SaPKo	0	9	SaPKo	3
5	KooKoo	3	12	FPS	0
12	FPS	0				11	FPS	–
7	HeKi	3				12	KOOVEE	–
10	Salamat	0	10	Salamat	3
6	Jokipojat	3	11	KOOVEE	2
11	KOOVEE	0

Rank	Team	GP	W	OTW	T	OTL	L	GF	GA	Diff	Pts
1.	LeKi	6	4	0	1	0	1	26	19	+7	9
2.	Titaanit	6	3	0	2	0	1	22	16	+6	8
3.	KOOVEE	6	3	0	1	0	2	23	24	−1	7
4.	FPS	6	0	0	0	0	6	16	28	−12	0

== SM-Liiga Qualification ==
KalPa – Jukurit
14 March	KalPa	Jukurit	3–2 OT
15 March	Jukurit	KalPa	4–5 OT
17 March	KalPa	Jukurit	8–2
19 March	Jukurit	KalPa	2–5
KalPa wins 4:0.
