= 2005–06 Mestis season =

2005–06 Mestis
- League: Mestis
- Sport: Ice hockey
- Duration: September 2005 – April 2006
- Number of teams: 11

Regular season
- Best record: Jukurit
- Runners-up: Sport
- Relegated to Suomi-sarja: Haukat & Hermes

Playoffs
- Finals champions: Jukurit
- Runners-up: Sport

Mestis seasons
- ← 2004–05 2006–07 →

The 2005–06 Mestis season was the sixth season of the Mestis, the second level of ice hockey in Finland. 11 teams participated in the league, and Jukurit won the championship. The season was played with only 11 teams because KalPa got promoted to SM-liiga at the end of last season.

== Standings ==
Rank	Team	GP	W	OTW	T	OTL	L	GF	GA	Diff	Pts
1.	Jukurit	45	29	0	4	1	11	173	102	+71	63
2.	Sport	45	26	2	1	1	15	172	106	+66	58
3.	TUTO Hockey	45	24	2	2	1	16	157	123	+34	55
4.	Hokki	45	23	2	2	0	18	127	124	+3	52
5.	KooKoo	45	18	4	2	4	17	142	129	+13	50
6.	Kiekko-Vantaa	45	21	2	2	2	18	130	128	+2	50
7.	Salamat	45	19	0	4	3	19	146	151	−5	45
8.	Jokipojat	45	17	3	3	2	20	131	160	−29	45
9.	FPS	45	17	1	0	3	24	127	140	−13	39
10.	Hermes	45	12	3	4	1	25	116	156	−40	35
11.	Haukat	45	9	1	3	1	31	97	196	−99	24

== Playoffs ==
Quarterfinals
1	Jukurit	3
8	Jokipojat	1
2	Sport	3
7	Salamat	2
3	TUTO Hockey	3
6	Kiekko-Vantaa	0
4	Hokki	3
5	KooKoo	1

Semifinals
1	Jukurit	3
4	Hokki	2
2	Sport	3
3	TUTO Hockey	0

Finals
1	Jukurit	3
2	Sport	1
Third place
3	TUTO Hockey	1
4	Hokki	0

== Qualification ==
Rank	Team	GP	W	OTW	T	OTL	L	GF	GA	Diff	Pts
1.	HeKi	8	5	0	2	0	1	27	15	+12	12
2.	SaPKo	8	4	0	3	0	1	22	18	+4	11
3.	KOOVEE	8	4	0	1	0	3	19	23	−4	9
4.	Hermes	8	3	0	2	0	3	29	23	−6	8
5.	Titaanit	8	0	0	0	0	8	13	31	−8	0

Hermes got relegated to Suomi-sarja. Haukat gave up their place in Mestis without relegation matches. Top three teams of the relegation series got promoted.
