= 2012–13 Suomi-sarja season =

Ice hockey season in Finland

The 2012–12 Suomi-sarja season was the 14th season of the Suomi-sarja, the third level of ice hockey in Finland. 12 teams participated in the league, and RoKi won the championship, however no playoffs were held. They were not promoted to the Mestis league for 2013–14 however and Kotkan Titaanit was relegated to III-divisioona for financial reasons.

== First round ==
=== Group 1 ===
#	Team	GP	W	OTW	OTL	L	GF	GA	Diff	Pts
1	RoKi	20	15	1	1	3	91	44	+47	48
2	S-Kiekko	20	11	2	0	7	74	56	+18	37
3	JHT	20	11	0	0	9	80	73	+7	33
4	Kokkolan Hermes	20	10	1	1	8	69	62	+7	33
5	Waasa Red Ducks	20	9	0	2	9	71	69	+2	29
6	Raahe-Kiekko	20	8	1	2	9	56	62	-6	28
7	Ahmat	20	0	1	0	19	31	106	-75	2

=== Group 2 ===
#	Team	GP	W	OTW	OTL	L	GF	GA	Diff	Pts
1	Hydraulic Oilers	20	12	2	1	5	95	70	+25	41
2	KeuPa HT	20	12	2	0	6	124	168	-44	40
3	PYRY	20	10	2	4	4	99	78	+21	38
4	KOOVEE	20	9	2	2	7	85	78	+7	33
5	IPK	20	10	0	2	8	79	74	+5	32
6	KalPa	20	4	3	3	10	76	108	-32	21
7	Diskos	20	0	1	2	17	54	136	-82	4

=== Group 3 ===
#	Team	GP	W	OTW	OTL	L	GF	GA	Diff	Pts
1	BeWe TuusKi	20	11	3	1	5	91	65	+26	40
2	HC Satakunta	20	12	1	1	6	73	44	+29	39
3	Kotkan Titaanit	20	12	0	3	5	94	73	+21	39
4	FPS	20	12	1	1	6	83	68	+15	39
5	Kiekkohait	20	8	1	1	10	77	89	-12	27
6	Hunters	20	3	3	1	13	59	83	-24	16
7	Imatran Ketterä	20	2	1	2	15	53	108	-55	10

== Qualification for Final round ==
- Hermes - IPK 2:3, 5:1, 4:1
- Waasa Red Ducks - FPS 2:1 OT, 10:5
- KOOVEE - Kiekkohait 2:3 OT, 12:4, 3:1

== Qualification round ==
=== Group 1 ===
#	Team	GP	W	OTW	OTL	L	GF	GA	Diff	Pts
1	KalPa	21	16	3	0	2	149	72	+77	54
2	Raahe-Kiekko	21	15	1	0	5	112	52	+60	47
3	IPK	21	13	0	1	7	135	94	+41	40
4	Ahmat	21	9	0	2	10	97	100	-3	29
5	YJK	20	7	2	0	11	89	102	-13	25
6	TIHC	20	8	0	1	11	112	166	-54	25
7	Virkiä	21	6	0	1	14	104	132	-28	19
8	Muik Hockey	21	3	0	1	17	71	151	-80	10

=== Group 2 ===
#	Team	GP	W	OTW	OTL	L	GF	GA	Diff	Pts
1	FPS	21	20	1	0	0	165	56	+109	62
2	LLuja	21	13	1	3	4	102	79	+23	44
3	VG-62	21	10	3	1	7	111	92	+19	37
4	Pingviinit	21	8	2	0	11	86	111	-25	28
5	Kiekkohait	21	8	1	1	11	92	99	-7	27
6	Diskos	21	7	0	1	13	83	97	-14	22
7	IK-VI	21	5	0	2	14	88	138	-50	17
8	Karhu HT	21	5	0	0	16	95	150	-55	15

=== Group 3 ===
#	Team	GP	W	OTW	OTL	L	GF	GA	Diff	Pts
1	BeWe TuusKi	21	14	3	2	2	138	67	+71	50
2	Ketterä	21	14	0	2	5	96	66	+30	44
3	Hunters	21	11	0	3	7	105	86	+19	36
4	Kiekkokopla	21	9	2	3	7	99	86	+13	34
5	H.K.H	21	9	3	0	9	91	94	-3	33
6	Talvisalo Traitors	21	5	3	2	11	88	110	-22	23
7	PiPS	21	6	2	1	12	72	116	-44	23
8	NasKi	24	6	0	0	18	68	132	-64	18

== Final round ==
#	Team	GP	W	OTW	OTL	L	GF	GA	Diff	Pts
1	RoKi	22	17	1	0	4	92	46	+46	53
2	PYRY	22	15	1	0	6	101	69	+32	47
3	KeuPa HT	22	13	1	2	6	100	63	+37	43
4	KOOVEE	22	12	1	0	9	105	81	+24	38
5	BeWe TuusKi	22	11	0	3	8	81	71	+10	36
6	HC Satakunta	22	9	2	1	10	86	95	-9	32
7	Hydraulic Oilers	22	9	1	1	11	82	85	-3	30
8	Kotkan Titaanit	22	9	1	1	11	79	88	-9	30
9	Kokkolan Hermes	22	8	2	0	12	69	93	-24	28
10	S-Kiekko	22	7	1	2	12	71	98	-27	25
11	Waasa Red Ducks	22	5	1	3	13	61	95	-34	20
12	JHT	22	3	2	1	16	59	110	-51	14

== Relegation round ==
#	Team	GP	W	OTW	OTL	L	GF	GA	Diff	Pts
1	Waasa Red Ducks	8	6	0	0	2	41	33	+8	18
2	Ketterä	8	5	1	0	2	41	27	+14	17
3	JHT	8	3	1	0	4	22	24	-2	11
4	LLuja	8	2	0	2	4	32	47	-15	8
5	Raahe-Kiekko	8	1	1	1	5	27	32	-5	6

- JHT - NuPS 2:0 (7:4, 3:2)
