= 2007–08 Mestis season =

2007–08 Mestis
- League: Mestis
- Sport: Ice hockey
- Duration: September 2007 – April 2008
- Teams: 12

Regular season
- Best record: TUTO Hockey
- Runners-up: Hokki

Playoffs
- Finals champions: TUTO Hockey
- Runners-up: Hokki

Mestis seasons
- ← 2006–07 2008–09 →

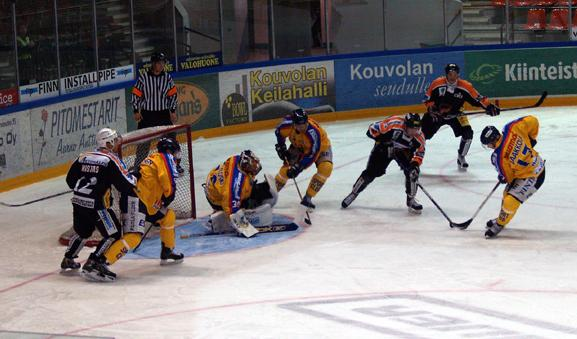
KooKoo playing against Jukurit for third place

The 2007–08 Mestis season was the eighth season of the Mestis, the second level of ice hockey in Finland. 12 teams participated in the league, and TUTO Hockey won the championship.

== Standings ==
Rank	Team	GP	W	OTW	OTL	L	GF	GA	Diff	Pts
1.	TUTO Hockey	45	33	1	4	7	214	93	+121	105
2.	Hokki	45	23	7	1	14	157	122	+35	84
3.	Jukurit	45	23	6	3	13	134	101	+33	84
4.	KooKoo	45	26	1	2	16	151	112	+29	82
5.	LeKi	45	22	6	2	15	152	141	+11	80
6.	Sport	45	23	2	3	17	193	139	+54	76
7.	Jokipojat	45	20	3	3	19	133	135	−2	69
8.	SaPKo	45	17	2	5	21	122	164	−42	60
9.	Kiekko-Vantaa	45	14	4	2	25	128	169	−41	52
10.	HeKi	45	13	3	4	25	117	160	−43	49
11.	Salamat	45	10	3	6	26	127	202	−75	42
12.	Titaanit	45	5	4	6	30	104	188	−84	29

== Playoffs ==
Quarterfinals
1	TUTO Hockey	3
8	SaPKo	0
2	Hokki	3
7	Jokipojat	0
3	Jukurit	3
6	Sport	2
4	KooKoo	3
5	LeKi	0

Semifinals
1	TUTO Hockey	3
4	KooKoo	1
2	Hokki	3
3	Jukurit	2

Finals
1	TUTO Hockey	3
2	Hokki	1
Third place
3	Jukurit	1
4	KooKoo	0

== Qualification ==
Rank	Team	GP	W	OTW	OTL	L	GF	GA	Diff	Pts
1.	Titaanit	6	5	0	0	1	23	17	+6	15
2.	Salamat	6	3	0	0	3	16	13	+3	9
3.	D-Kiekko	6	3	0	0	3	15	13	+2	9
4.	Kiekko-Laser	6	1	0	0	5	12	23	−11	3

No teams were relegated or promoted.
