= 2012–13 Mestis season =

Finnish ice hockey league season

The 2012–13 Mestis season was the 13th season of the Mestis, the second level of ice hockey in Finland. Twelve teams participated in the league, and Jukurit won the championship.

== Regular season ==
Rank	Team	GP	W	OTW	OTL	L	GF	GA	Pts
1	Jukurit	48	29	3	5	12	150	106	95
2	TuTo Hockey	48	24	6	4	13	161	128	89
3	Sport	48	23	5	2	18	147	127	81
4	Hokki	48	20	7	7	14	133	119	81
5	KooKoo	48	20	7	5	16	142	133	79
6	Jokipojat	48	20	4	6	18	155	144	74
7	Peliitat	48	19	3	4	22	154	159	67
8	LeKi	48	18	4	5	21	144	154	67
9	JYP-Akatemia	48	14	7	5	21	136	152	61
10	SaPKo	48	15	5	6	22	132	153	61
11	K-Vantaa	48	13	6	8	21	123	144	59
12	HCK	48	11	6	5	26	110	168	50

== Playoffs ==
Quarter-finals
Jukurit	4
LeKi	0
Sport	1
Jokipojat	4
TUTO Hockey	4
Peliitat	2
Hokki	0
KooKoo	4

Semi-finals
Jukurit	3
Jokipojat	0
TUTO Hockey	1
KooKoo	3

Final
Jukurit	3
KooKoo	0
Third place
TUTO Hockey	1
Jokipojat	0

== SM-Liiga promotion ==
			Series	1	2	3	4	5	6	7
Tampereen Ilves	–	Jukurit	4:1	2:0	3:1	2:1 OT	4:7	4:2	-	-

Tampereen Ilves remained in the SM-Liiga.

== Qualification ==
=== Play-outs ===
- K-Vantaa - HCK 4:1 on series.

=== Qualification round ===
Rank	Team	GP	W	OTW	OTL	L	GF	GA	Diff	Pts
1.	HCK	6	5	1	0	0	23	10	+13	17
2.	RoKi	6	3	1	0	2	15	11	+4	11
3.	KeuPa HT	6	1	0	1	4	19	27	−8	4
4.	Pyry Nokia	6	1	0	1	4	19	28	−9	4
