= Registered association (Finland) =

Registered association in Finland

In Finland a rekisteröity yhdistys (Finnish for registered association) or registrerad förening (Swedish) is a registered, non-profit organization. The abbreviations ry (also ry.) (Finnish), rf (Swedish) or rs (Northern Sámi) are used as a suffix ending of the association's name, added when the association is officially registered. Registration is not mandatory, but is required in order for the association to become a juridical person, which confers various benefits. Registration requires the association to create a legally sound constitution, which must be approved by the Finnish Patent and Registration Office.

Said constitution must contain provisions outlining the association's policies regarding language, its home address, its intended purpose and forms of activity, membership fees, its government board, accounting and bookkeeping, revision of the constitution, assembly meetings and how the association's property is to be utilised in the event of its dissolution. Registered associations can have both individual persons and legal persons as its members. The association must have a government board consisting of at least three members, out of whom the speaker must be at the age of majority (18 years), the rest at least 15 years old. In principle, if the constitution provides for it, every member who is at least 15 years of age has one vote during board meetings, board elections and other votes.

When an association is officially registered, it becomes a juridical person with legal personality separate from those of its individual members and gains the right to own property and make contracts on its own behalf independently of its members, and it ensures the legal enforceability of its constitution. At the same time, the individual members no longer personally hold responsibility for the association's liabilities.

In 2021, Finland had around 108,000 registered associations, down from 130,000 in 2011.

== Related types of Finnish companies ==
- avoin yhtiö, abbreviated ay, general partnership
- kommandiittiyhtiö, abbreviated ky, limited partnership
- osakeyhtiö, abbreviated Oy, limited company (in Swedish: Aktiebolag, abbreviated Ab)

== See also ==
- Registered association (Germany)
