= TuusKi =

Bewe TuusKi
- City: Tuusula, Finland
- League: Suomi-sarja
- Founded: 1994
- Home arena: Talosyke Areena (capacity 1,200)
- Colours
- Owner(s): KJT TuusKi Edustuskiekkoilu ry
- General manager: Teijo Jalonen
- Head coach: Simo Mälkiä
- Captain: Lasse Malo
- Affiliate: Kiekko-Vantaa (Mestis)

BeWe TuusKi is a Finnish ice hockey team from Tuusula, Finland, playing in the Suomi-sarja league. It plays home games at the Talosyke Areena.
