= 2011–12 Mestis season =

Finnish ice hockey league season

The 2011–12 Mestis season was the 12th season of the Mestis, the second level of ice hockey in Finland. 11 teams participated in the league, and Sport won the championship.

== Standings ==
Rank	Team	GP	W	OTW	OTL	L	GF	GA	Diff	Pts
1.	Jukurit	46	25	7	5	9	164	107	+57	94
2.	KooKoo	46	25	3	10	8	121	94	+27	91
3.	Sport	46	24	4	8	10	154	104	+50	88
4.	Jokipojat	46	18	8	4	16	142	134	+8	74
5.	SaPKo	46	18	6	3	19	136	126	+10	69
6.	TuTo	46	16	6	4	20	132	150	-18	64
7.	Hokki	46	15	4	10	17	113	125	-12	63
8.	Kiekko-Vantaa	46	13	6	6	21	118	143	-25	57
9.	JYP-Akatemia	46	14	7	0	25	104	156	-52	56
10.	LeKi	46	14	4	5	23	105	130	-25	55
11.	Peliitat	46	12	4	4	26	103	123	-20	48

== Playoffs ==
Quarter-finals
KooKoo	4
Hokki	2
Sport	4
TuTo Hockey	0
Jukurit	4
Kiekko-Vantaa	0
Jokipojat	4
SaPKo	1

Semi-finals
KooKoo	1
Sport	3
Jukurit	1
Jokipojat	3

Final
Sport	3
Jokipokat	0
Third place
Jukurit	0
KooKoo	1

== SM-Liiga promotion ==
			Series	1	2	3	4	5	6	7
Tampereen Ilves	–	Vaasan Sport	4:1	6:1	5:1	0:2	3:2	4:0	-	-

Tampereen Ilves remained in the SM-Liiga.

== Qualification ==
=== Play-outs ===
- LeKi - Peliitat 2:4

=== Qualification round ===
Rank	Team	GP	W	OTW	OTL	L	GF	GA	Diff	Pts
1.	LeKi	6	5	0	0	1	31	13	+18	15
2.	HCK	6	4	0	0	2	30	15	+15	12
3.	KeuPa HT	6	2	0	0	4	20	40	−20	6
4.	Koo-Vee	6	1	0	0	5	18	31	−13	3
