= 2008–09 Mestis season =

2008–09 Mestis
- League: Mestis
- Sport: Ice hockey
- Duration: September 2008 – April 2009
- Teams: 12

Regular season
- Best record: Jokipojat
- Runners-up: Sport
- Relegated to Suomi-sarja: Titaanit

Playoffs
- Finals champions: Sport
- Runners-up: Jokipojat

Mestis seasons
- ← 2007–08 2009–10 →

The 2008–09 Mestis season was the ninth season of the Mestis, the second level of ice hockey in Finland. 12 teams participated in the league, and Sport won the championship.

== Standings ==
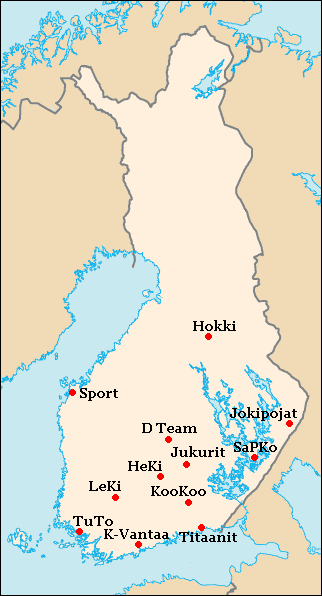

Rank	Team	GP	W	OTW	OTL	L	GF	GA	Diff	Pts
1.	Jokipojat	45	27	2	5	11	156	101	+54	90
2.	Sport	45	25	5	2	13	145	104	+41	87
3.	Hokki	45	18	11	5	11	147	112	+35	81
4.	KooKoo	45	22	5	5	13	149	123	+26	81
5.	TUTO Hockey	45	23	3	3	16	156	110	+46	78
6.	Kiekko-Vantaa	45	20	6	3	16	130	120	+10	75
7.	D Team	45	20	3	4	18	120	124	−4	70
8.	LeKi	45	20	3	2	20	146	145	+1	68
9.	Jukurit	45	19	2	6	18	126	119	+7	67
10.	HeKi	45	10	3	4	28	114	171	−57	40
11.	Titaanit	45	9	4	3	29	100	200	−100	38
12.	SaPKo	45	7	3	6	29	113	181	−68	33

== Playoffs ==
Quarterfinals
1	Jokipojat	3
8	LeKi	0
2	Sport	3
7	D Team	0
3	Hokki	3
6	Kiekko-Vantaa	2
4	KooKoo	2
5	TUTO Hockey	3

Semifinals
1	Jokipojat	3
5	TUTO Hockey	1
2	Sport	3
3	Hokki	2

Finals
1	Jokipojat	1
2	Sport	3
Third place
3	Hokki	1
5	TUTO Hockey	0

== Qualification ==
Rank	Team	GP	W	OTW	OTL	L	GF	GA	Diff	Pts
1.	SaPKo	6	5	0	0	1	29	17	+12	15
2.	RoKi	6	4	1	0	1	28	19	+9	14
3.	Titaanit	6	1	1	1	3	13	29	−16	6
4.	Ketterä	6	0	0	1	5	10	25	−15	1

Titaanit got relegated to Suomi-sarja.
