= HC Salamat =

Finnish ice hockey team in Kirkkonummi

HCK Salamat
- City: Kirkkonummi
- League: III-divisioona
- Founded: 2002
- Home arena: Varuboden-areena
- Colours: Blue, white
- Head coach: Immo Suutarinen (2020–21)
- Captain: Ari Katavisto (2021–22)

Franchise history
- 2002–2009: HC Salamat
- 2011–: HCK Salamat

Previous franchise history
- 1970–2002: Espoo Palloseura

Hockey Club Kirkkonummen Salamat or HCK Salamat are a Finnish ice hockey team in the III-divisioona, the fifth-tier men's ice hockey league in Finland. They play in Kirkkonummi, a municipality in the western Greater Helsinki region, at Varuboden-areena. The club was founded in 2002 as HC Salamat and played in the Mestis during 2003 to 2008.

== History ==
Salamat was created when the rights for the men's representative ice hockey team of the Espoo-based sports club Espoo Palloseura (EPS; 'Espoo Ball Club') were purchased by the City of Kirkkonummi in 2001. EPS played in the Suomi-sarja, the third-highest men's ice hockey league in Finland. In 2002, the team relocated to Kirkkonummi, a neighboring municipality of Espoo, and was rebranded as Salamat ('Lightning').

In their first season, Salamat drew international attention when they signed Hayley Wickenheiser, star of the Canadian women's national ice hockey team, making her the first female forward to be rostered by a professional ice hockey team. At the conclusion of their first season, HC Salamat earned promotion from the Suomi-sarja to the second-tier Mestis.

Former NHL player Teemu Selänne owned a one-third stake in the team, beginning in 2002, but reportedly sold his share of the team in December 2006.

Salamat played in the Mestis from 2003 until being relegated to the Suomi-sarja in 2008. In August 2009, after a poor season in the Suomi-sarja, the owning osakeyhtiö (limited company) of the team, HC Kirkkonummen Salamat Oy, was declared bankrupt and ceased operations.

Due to its status as a distinct non-profit registered association, HCK Salamat Juniorit ry, the former junior affiliate of HC Kirkkonummen Salamat Oy, continued to function following the bankruptcy. In 2011, the club formed a representative men's team and Salamat returned to the ice in the III-divisioona. In their first season, HCK Salamat gained promotion to the II-divisioona, where they remained until being relegated at the conclusion of the 2018–19 season. They have played in the III-divisoona since 2019.

== Players and personnel ==
=== Notable alumni ===
- Viktors Bļinovs, 2004–05
- Janne Jalasvaara, 2004–05
- Eetu Koivistoinen, 2014–15
- Jarno Koskiranta, 2007–08
- Tero Koskiranta, 2005–2008
- Tero Lehterä, 2004–05
- Jan Lundell, 2004–05
- Ville Uusitalo, 2003–04 & 2005–06
- Hayley Wickenheiser, 2003–04

Source: Elite Prospects

=== Notable youth products ===
- Niclas Almari
- Heikki Huttunen
- Matilda Nilsson
- Matias Nisula
- Oskari Uomala

Source: Elite Prospects

=== Head coaches ===
- Matti Hagman, 2002–2004
- Vesa Surenkin, 2004–2005
- Niki Andersson, 2005–2006
- Jyrki Tuukkanen, 2006–2007
- Jarmo Jamalainen, 2007–2008
- Petro Koivunen, 2015–2018
- Immo Suutarinen, 2019–
