= Rovaniemen Kiekko =

Finnish ice hockey club

RoKi
- City: Rovaniemi, Finland
- League: Mestis
- Founded: 1979
- Home arena: Lappi Areena (capacity 3,500)
- Colours: Blue, yellow, white
- Owner(s): RoKi Hockey Oy
- General manager: Janne Hyvärinen
- Head coach: Sakari Salmela
- Farm club(s): Rovaniemen Kiekko ry
- Website: rokihockey.fi

Rovaniemen Kiekko, abbreviated RoKi, is an ice hockey team in the Finnish Mestis. They play in Rovaniemi, Finland at Lappi Areena, which has a 3,500 spactator capacity. RoKi was established in 1979 and is operated by RoKi Hockey Oy.

The team is affiliated with the developmental club Rovaniemen Kiekko ry, which has active sections in minor and junior ice hockey and also operates the RoKi women's team, which plays in the top-tier Naisten Liiga.

== Honours ==
=== Mestis ===
- (bronze) Mestis (2): 2022, 2023

=== Suomi-sarja ===
- (gold) Suomi-sarja (2): 2011, 2013
- (silver) Suomi-sarja (1): 2009
