= Haukat =

Finnish ice hockey club

- City: Järvenpää
- League: Suomi-sarja
- Founded: 1979
- Home arena: Järvenpään jäähalli
- Colours: Orange, black
- General manager: Matti Ollikainen
- Head coach: Sami Helenius
- Captain: Samu Öystilä
- Website: Haukat.fi

The Jääurheiluseura Hawks, commonly known as the Haukat ('Hawks'), is a men's ice hockey team in the Suomi-sarja, the third-tier professional ice hockey league in Finland. The team is based in Järvenpää, in the Uusimaa region of southern Finland, and their home arena is the Järvenpää Ice Hall (Finnish: Järvenpää jäähalli).

== History ==
Founded in 1979, the team faced relegation to the Suomi-sarja after losing the Mestis regular season in 2005–06. After years of financial trouble and facing the prospect of relegation, Haukat gave up their place in Mestis and ended their hockey activities for a few years.

Haukat started playing hockey again during the season 2009–2010. Haukat started playing in 2. Divisioona, which is the fourth highest level of hockey in finland. The team was promoted to Suomi-sarja for 2017–2018 season.

== Notable Haukat players ==
- Petri Varis
- Kimmo Kuhta
- Juuso Laukkanen
- Jussi Helminen
- Miika Uosukainen
- Jari Viuhkola
- Jari Kurri
