= Kotkan Titaanit =

- City: Kotka, Finland
- League: Suomi-sarja
- Founded: 1974
- Home arena: Kotka Ice Rink (capacity 1,958)
- Colours
- Owner: HK Titaanit ry
- General manager: Juho Hannukainen
- Head coach: Aapo Lampinen
- Captain: Eppu Oksanen
- Parent club: Hamina-Kotka Kiekkojuniorit ry
- Website: www.titaanit.fi

Kotkan Titaanit ("Kotka Titans") is an ice-hockey club founded in 1974 in Kotka, which at its best has played four season at Finland's second highest level. Titaanit play their home match at Kotka Ice Rink, which can hold nearly two thousand (1958) viewers.

== Early years ==
The predecessor of Titaanit was Sunilan Sisu. Titaanit played the second highest level of Finland in Finland in the mid-1990s. It was then ranked 11th in the 1995–1996 season and ranked 12th in the next season. In the Suomi-Sarja, Titaanit played it from 1999 to 2000 up to the 2006–2007 season. At the end of the 2006–2007 season, the club won the Suomi-Sarja Championship and got to Mestis for the 2007–2008 season, where it also played the 2008–2009 season.

== Time in Mestis ==
In Mestis qualifying, the club presented certain excerpts and got up to one point in Mestis before the Koovee. During the Mestis qualifiers, Suomi Sarja finals was also played Between the Titaanit and Lempäälä Kisa.

The Titans Season 2007–2008 in Mestis was difficult due to injuries, players and coaches, and the team did not have any chance of rolling their game during the regular season. In the championship qualifiers, the Titans, on the other hand, made certain excerpts and retained their place in Mestis for the 2008–2009 season, quite painlessly, overcoming the entire qualifying round with a clear distinction.

In the next season, the difficulties of Titaanit continued and the team had to start their game with eight match-length missions because of their home base of the freezing equipment. A fairly startling game cone turned in November to December, with losing up to 15 matches. With it, the place in the spring qualifying round with SaPKo, which was left out of the series batch, was confirmed. In the qualifying rounds, Titaanit went to RoKi and Titaanit fell back to the Suomi-Sarja.

== Falling into the Suomi-Sarja ==
The club played in the 2009–2010 season Suomi-Sarja. However, in December 2009, Titaanit Hockey Oy, which operated the representation team, went bankrupt when the Mestis periods had accumulated too much debt. As a result of the bankruptcy, the Titaanit lost their place in the Suomi-Sarja, but was able to play until the end of the season when the new Kiekko-Titaanit Oy took over the expenses for the rest of the year. Season 2011-2012 Titaanit started the Ice Hockey season in II divisioona, where it won all 10 matches at the beginning of November in Suomi-Sarja Qualifier. After placing second in the qualifying round, he assured himself the team in the Finnish Premier League for the 2012–2013 season. Kiekko-Titaanit Oy went bankrupt in the summer of 2013 and abandoned its place in Suomi-Sarja.

== Titaanit Akatemia 2013–2015 ==
The title of the Titaanit was continued by the association Titaani-Juniorit ry, which manages the club's junior club. The team's new representation team, Titaanit Akatemia, started in Division III of the Kymi-Saimaa region during the period 2013–2014, ending it through the qualifying rounds in the South Division II Division. The next season 2014–2015, which eventually ended in the finals of the semi-finals for the beautiful GrIFK, went to under the same name and under the junior organization but for the period 2015-2016 the representation team was re-united under its own association, HK Titaanit, again with the traditional Titaanit.

== Rise back to Finland's third highest level ==
Titaanit announced in the summer of 2015 when the new background association was announced, aiming for the South Division II championship and the opening up opportunity for the Finnish Series. Titaanit played in the most sophisticated season II division, losing the regular season's 26 games with just one regular time and two extra time / winning slots. In the playoffs, Titaanit marched from victory to victory and ultimately dropped the two-time finals of Kerava's KJT Men wins 2–0.

After securing the championship of the Southern Region, Titaanit were ready for a while to prepare for the Finnish Championships until the Finnish Ice Hockey Association announced that the second stage of the qualifiers would not be played up due to the low level of clubs they wanted. At the same time, SJL reported that the Titaanit and the second rising, Jyväskälä, the Finnish Sports Expo, will be able to apply for a seat in Finland for the period 2016–2017, provided that the license conditions imposed by the association are fulfilled.

Eventually, on 12 May it became known that both the Titaanit and Riemu were approved for the Suomi-Sarja 2016-2017 together with 14 other teams.

== Honours ==
- Suomi-sarja champion: 2007
- The southern region, II-divisioona champion: 2016
- The Kymi-Saimaa region, III-divisioona champion: 2014
- Suomi-sarja bronze: 2024
