= JYP-Akatemia =

- City: Jyväskylä, Finland
- League: Mestis
- Founded: 2008
- Folded: 2017
- Home arena: Synergia-areena (capacity 4,618)
- Colours
- Parent club(s): JYP Jyväskylä (Liiga)

Franchise history
- 2008–2011: D Team
- 2011–2017: JYP-Akatemia

JYP-Akatemia was a Finnish professional ice hockey team based in Jyväskylä. The club played in the Mestis from 2008 to 2017, after acquiring the spot from D-Kiekko. During their inaugural season, JYP-Akatemia was known as D Team. It was renamed JYP-Akatemia in 2011; in order to highlight the club's cooperation with its parent club.

JYP-Akatemia dissolved and ceased all operations in the summer of 2017, motivated by problems with finances and the wishes of the affiliate.

== Season by season record ==
Season	League	GP	W	L	OTW	OTL	Pts	GF	GA	Finish	Playoffs
2011–12	Mestis	46	14	25	7	0	56	104	156	9th	Did not make playoffs
2012–13	Mestis	48	14	22	7	5	61	136	152	9th	Did not make playoffs

== Notable players ==
- Yohann Auvitu
- Riku Helenius
- Samuli Kankaanperä
- Olli Määttä
- Harri Pesonen
- Tuomas Pihlman
- Sami Vatanen
