= 2010–11 Mestis season =

Finnish ice hockey league season

The 2010–11 Mestis season was the 11th season of the Mestis, the second level of ice hockey in Finland. 12 teams participated in the league, and Sport won the championship.

== Standings ==
Rank	Team	GP	W	OTW	OTL	L	GF	GA	Diff	Pts
1.	Jukurit	49	29	8	3	9	187	108	+79	106
2.	KooKoo	49	31	3	4	11	169	102	+67	103
3.	Sport	49	22	5	3	19	139	133	+6	79
4.	SaPKo	49	20	7	5	17	156	152	+4	79
5.	D Team	49	20	7	3	19	147	142	+5	77
6.	LeKi	49	24	1	2	22	158	163	−5	76
7.	K-Laser	49	20	2	6	21	145	152	−7	70
8.	K-Vantaa	49	18	6	3	22	143	150	−7	69
9.	HeKi	49	18	5	5	21	143	168	−25	69
10.	Jokipojat	49	16	3	8	22	146	173	−27	62
11.	Hokki	49	15	5	5	24	136	155	−19	60
12.	TuTo	49	13	0	5	31	137	185	−48	44

== Playoffs ==
Quarterfinals

- Jukurit – K-Vantaa 3–0 on series
- D Team – SaPKo 3–1 on series
- KooKoo – K-Laser 3–0 on series
- Sport – LeKi 3–0 on series

Semifinals

- Jukurit – D Team 3–0 on series
- Sport – KooKoo 3–1 on series

Final

- Sport – Jukurit 3–2 on series

3rd place

- D Team – KooKoo 1–0 on series

== Play-outs ==
- Hokki – TuTo 2:3

=== Table ===
Rank	Team	GP	W	OTW	OTL	L	GF	GA	Diff	Pts
1.	Hokki	6	4	1	0	1	22	13	+9	14
2.	RoKi	6	4	0	0	2	38	20	+18	12
3.	Koo-Vee	6	2	0	0	4	20	33	−13	6
4.	HCK	6	1	0	1	4	24	38	−14	4
