= Kiekko-Laser =

- City: Oulu, Finland
- League: Mestis 2010–2011
- Founded: 2005
- Folded: 2011
- Home arena: Oulun Energia Areena (capacity: 6,768)
- Colours
- Affiliates: Oulun Kärpät (SM-liiga)
- Website: www.kiekkolaser.fi

Kiekko-Laser were a Finnish ice hockey club from Oulu, Finland. They played in the country's second-tier league, Mestis, after winning a qualification round against RoKi in 2010.

On December 5, 2011, however, the club announced its bankruptcy and dissolved its team.

== Coaching ==
- Head coach Mikko Manner
- Coach Teemu Käyhkö
- Goalkeeper coach Marko Hilli
