= Kiekko-Pojat =

Joensuun Kiekko-Pojat
- City: Joensuu
- League: Mestis
- Founded: 1960
- Home arena: Mehtimäki Ice Hall
- Colours
- General manager: Jaakko Lipponen
- Head coach: Kasper Vuorinen
- Captain: Patrick Isiguzo
- Website: joensuunkiekkopojat.fi

Joensuun Kiekko-Pojat is a Finnish semi-professional ice hockey team that plays in the Mestis, the second-highest men's ice hockey league in Finland. The club has spent three seasons in the top flight of Finnish hockey, season 1971–72 in SM-sarja and seasons 1989-90 and 1991–92 in SM-liiga.

== Honours ==
=== Champions ===
- (gold) Mestis (1): 2009-10
- (gold) Suomi-sarja (2): 2003–04, 2014–15
- (gold) I-Divisioona (3): 1988–89, 1990–91, 1992–93, 1996-97

=== Runners-up ===
- (silver) Mestis (2): 2008-09, 2011-12
- (bronze) Mestis (1): 2015-16
- (bronze) Suomi-sarja (1): 2003

== Current team ==
Updated February 6, 2025

No.	Nat	Player	Pos	S/G	Age	Acquired	Birthplace
33	(Finland)	Juho Ahopelto	G	L	27	2024	Kuopio, Finland
81	(Finland)	Jonne Brygger (A)	F	L	25	2024	Porvoo, Finland
84	(Finland)	Niklas Grönlund	D	L	24	2023	Helsinki, Finland
56	(Finland)	Antti Haikonen	F	L	21	2023	Joensuu, Finland
19	(Finland)	Patrick Isiguzo (C)	F	L	23	2023	Espoo, Finland
24	(Finland)	Juho Juvonen	D	L	23	2023	Joensuu, Finland
59	(Finland)	Rasmus Kankkunen	D	L	21	2023	Joensuu, Finland
92	(Finland)	Santeri Kekarainen	F	L	19	2024	Joensuu, Finland
4	(Czech Republic)	Jakub Kindl	F	L	38	2025	Šumperk, Czech Republic
86	(Finland)	Rasmus Kuronen	F	L	23	2024	Kontiolahti, Finland
6	(Finland)	Onni Lauri	D	L	22	2024	Kempele, Finland
26	(Finland)	Atte Lehikoinen	D	L	22	2024	Joensuu, Finland
3	(Finland)	Niko Liiri	D	R	24	2024	Jyväskylä, Finland
29	(Finland)	Joonas Lohisalo	F	L	22	2024	Oulu, Finland
30	(Finland)	Juho Markkanen	G	L	23	2024	Edmonton, Canada
67	(Finland)	Niklas Meriläinen	F	L	23	2024	Lieksa, Finland
10	(Finland)	Kasper Mäenpää	D	R	24	2023	Kiiminki, Finland
20	(Finland)	Kim Nieminen (L)	F	R	24	2024	Helsinki, Finland
93	(Slovakia)	Timotej Sille	F	L	30	2025	Bratislava, Slovakia
14	(Czech Republic)	Ivo Sedláček	F	R	22	2023	Brno, Czech Republic
28	(Finland)	Niilo Suvanto	C	L	22	2024	Oulu, Finland
52	(Finland)	Vertti Svensk	D	L	18	2024	Joensuu, Finland
11	(Finland)	Jani Taskula	F	R	25	2024	Lappeenranta, Finland
27	(Finland)	Oula Uski (A)	C	L	33	2024	Järvenpää, Finland
41	(Finland)	Valtteri Vaittinen	F	L	23	2023	Joensuu, Finland
72	(Finland)	Jasper Viitala	F	L	24	2023	Nivala, Finland
17	(Finland)	Riku Vähäniitty	G	L	22	2023	Joensuu, Finland

=== Team officials ===
Updated June 7, 2024

Title	Staff Member
General Manager	Jaakko Lipponen
Head coach	Kasper Vuorinen
Assistant coach	Mikko Rämö
Goaltending Coach	Mikko Rämö
Strength and conditioning coach	Samu Lappalainen

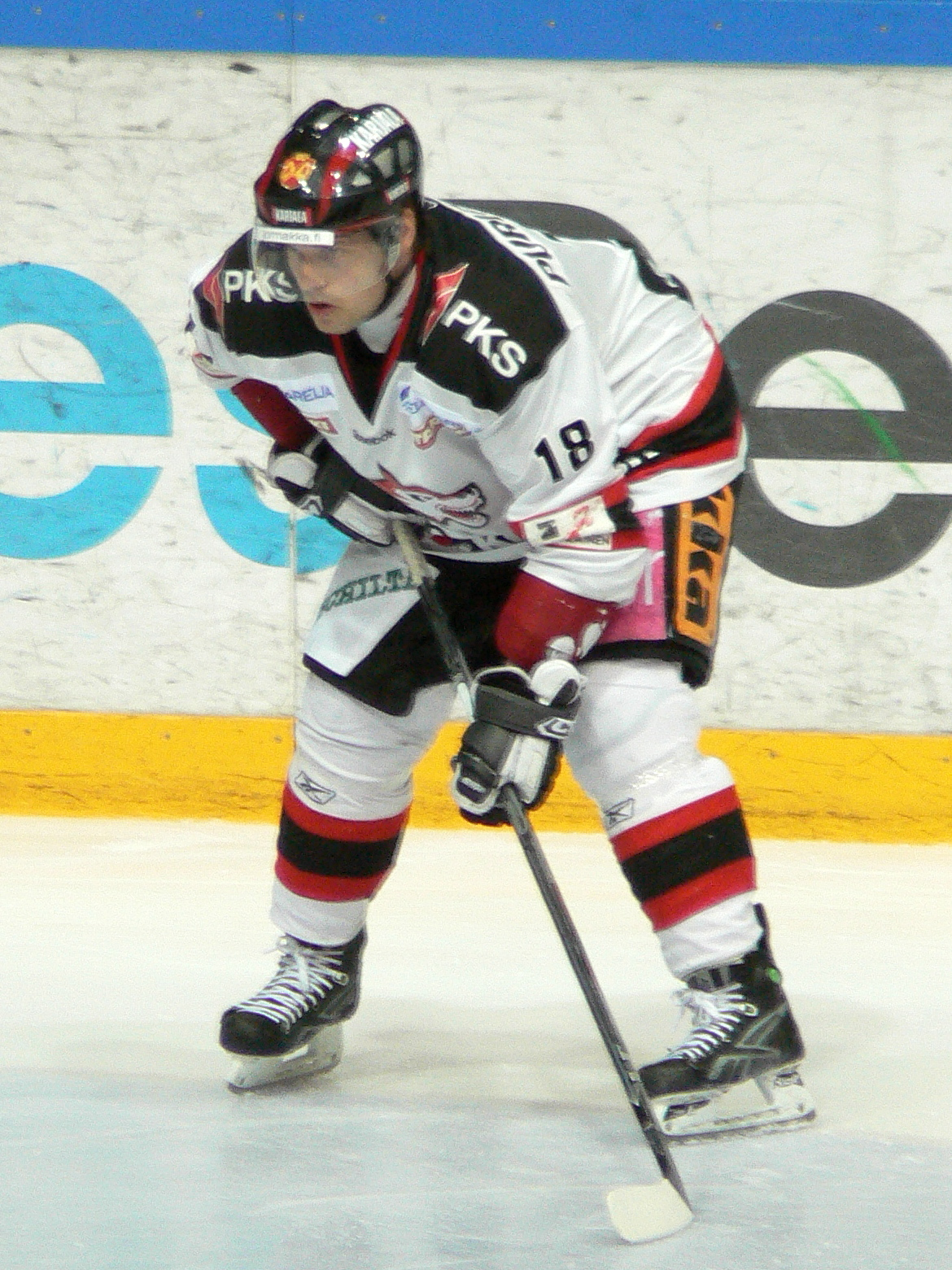
Sami Puruskainen season 2009–10

== Retired numbers ==
- # 1 Tapio Pohtinen
- # 9 Hannu Kapanen
- # 15 Lauri Mononen
- # 25 Markku Kyllönen

== Former players ==
- (Finland) Tero Arkiomaa
- (Czech Republic) Pavel Brendl
- (United States) Jon Fontas
- (Canada) Jocelyn Guimond
- (Latvia) Roberts Jekimovs
- (Finland) Hannu Kapanen
- (Finland) Jari Kapanen
- (Slovakia) Lubomir Kolnik
- (Finland) Markku Kyllönen
- (Finland) Mikael Ruohomaa
- (Czech Republic) Alexander Salák
- (Canada) Luke Sellars
- (Czech Republic) Antonin Stavjana
- (Czech Republic) Rostislav Vlach

== Season by season record ==
Since rejoining the Mestis in 2004–05

Season	League	GP	W	T	L	OTW	OTL	Pts	GF	GA	Finish	Playoffs
2004–05	Mestis	44	11	6	27	1	—	29	117	178	11th	Saved from relegation
2005–06	Mestis	45	17	8	20	—	—	45	131	160	8th	Quarterfinal loss
2006–07	Mestis	45	22	5	18	—	—	50	151	137	6th	Quarterfinal loss
2007–08	Mestis	45	20	—	19	3	3	69	133	125	7th	Quarterfinal loss
2008–09	Mesits	45	27	—	11	2	5	90	156	101	1st	Final loss
2009–10	Mestis	45	23	—	12	5	5	84	173	128	2nd	Champion
2010–11	Mestis	49	16	—	22	3	3	62	146	173	10th	Did not make playoffs
2011–12	Mestis	46	18	—	16	8	4	74	142	134	4th	Final loss
2012–13	Mestis	48	20	—	18	4	6	74	155	144	6th	Bronze game loss
2013–14	Mestis	56	22	—	23	5	6	82	152	150	7th	Quarterfinal loss
2014–15	Suomi-sarja	36	22	—	11	2	1	71	154	98	2nd	Champion
2015–16	Mestis	50	22	—	14	10	4	90	158	122	3rd	Bronze game win
