= Suomi-sarja =

3rd level ice hockey league in Finland

- Current season, competition or edition: 2025–26 Suomi-sarja season
- Sport: Ice hockey
- Founded: 1999; 27 years ago
- No. of teams: 13
- Country: Finland
- Most recent champion: Nokian Pyry (2023–24)
- Level on pyramid: Level 3
- Promotion to: Mestis
- Relegation to: 2. Divisioona
- Domestic cup: Finnish Cup
- Website: Suomi-sarja

The Suomi-sarja is Finland's third highest ice hockey league. Suomi-sarja has 14 teams. Suomi-sarja has been played since the 1999–2000 season. Prior to this, Finland's third league had been Division II since 1975 and before that the Provincial Series since 1947. During the 1990s the series also included an Estonian team. The series was played in two segments in the 2006–2007 season. During the 2007–2008 season there were four divisions. Teams playing in the Suomi-sarja can be relegated to the 2. Divisioona or promoted to Mestis.

During the 2022–23 season, there are 13 teams. The eight best teams continue to the playoffs and the worst two teams play in the qualifiers against 2. divisioona teams. The Suomi-sarja champion and the runner-up advance to Mestis qualifiers.

== Suomi-sarja medalists ==
Season	Gold	Silver	Bronze
1999–2000	Mikkelin Jukurit	Kiekko-Vantaa
2000–2001	Kalevan Pallo	Espoon Palloseura
2001–2002	Kajaanin Hokki	Kiekko-Oulu	KOOVEE
2002–2003	Savonlinnan Pallokerho	Kirkkonummen Salamat	Jokipojat
2003–2004	Jokipojat	KOOVEE
2004–2005	Seinäjoen Hockey Team	Heinolan Kiekko
2005–2006	Heinolan Kiekko	Savonlinnan Pallokerho	KOOVEE
2006–2007	Kotkan Titaanit	LeKi
2007–2008	D-Kiekko	Kiekko-Laser	HC Kerava
2008–2009	Ketterä	RoKi	Kiekko-Laser
2009–10	Kiekko-Laser	KJT TuusKi	KOOVEE
2010–11	RoKi	KOOVEE	HCK
2011–12	KeuPa HT	HCK	KOOVEE
2012–13	RoKi	PYRY	KeuPa HT
2013–14	KeuPa HT	FPS	Bewe TuusKi
2014–15	Jokipojat	Hermes	Bewe TuusKi
2015–16	IPK	Ketterä	JHT Kalajoki
2016–17	Ketterä	JHT Kalajoki	Pyry
2017–18	JHT Kalajoki	KOOVEE	Pyry
2018–19	Hokki	Hunters	Kiekko-Espoo
2019–20	Cancelled due to the COVID-19 pandemic
2020–21	Karhu HT	Haukat	Raahe-Kiekko
2021–22	D-Kiekko	JHT Kalajoki	Porvoo Hunters
2022–23	Pyry	JHT Kalajoki	Porvoo Hunters
2023–24	Pyry	LeKi	Kotkan Titaanit
2024-25	Pyry	Virkiä	Muik Hockey
2025-26	Haukat	Laser HT	LeKi

== Teams 2024–25 ==
The team names are usually the traditional name of the club. All clubs are commonly known by the name of their team. Oy and Ab are the abbreviations for limited company in Finnish and Swedish respectively.

Team name	Club's registered name	Location	Home venue, capacity	Titles Suomi-sarja
FPS	FPS Hockey Oy	Forssa	Forssa Ice Hall, 3,000	0
Haukat	Jääurheiluseura Hawks ry	Järvenpää	Järvenpää Ice Hall,	0
Hunters	Porvoon Hunters ry	Porvoo	Kokonniemi Ice Hall,	0
JHT	JHT Tuki Ry	Kalajoki	Pirkonsuo Ice Hall,	1
LeKi	Lempäälän Kisa Edustusjääkiekko ry	Lempäälä	Masku Areena	0
MuIK Hockey	MuIK Hockey AB	Nykarleby	Komarov Arena	0
PEPO	PEPO Hockey ry	Lappeenranta	Kisapuisto, 4,820	0
Pyry	Nokian Pyry Hockey Oy	Nokia	Nokia Ice Hall	3
Raahe-Kiekko	Raahe-Kiekko ry	Raahe	E. Heelakoski Areena	0
Riemu	Liikunnan Riemu Hockey ry	Jyväskylä	Synergia-areena,	0
SaPKo	SaPKo Hockey Oy	Savonlinna		1
S-Kiekko	Seihockey Oy	Seinäjoki		1
Titaanit	HK Titaanit ry	Kotka		1
Virkiä	Virkiä Hockey Oy	Lapua		0
