= Kajaanin Hokki =

Finnish ice hockey team

- City: Kajaani, Finland
- League: III-divisioona
- Founded: 1968
- Home arena: Kajaanin jäähalli
- Colours
- Owner: HC Hokki Kajaani ry
- General manager: (Finland) Sami Hakkarainen
- Head coach: (Finland) Timo Meriläinen

Kajaanin Hokki is a Finnish ice hockey team based in Kajaani. The last season of Hokki in Mestis, the second-highest tier of Finnish ice hockey, was the 2024–2025 season, after which it went bankrupt the second time in its franchise history. A little later, Hokki was refounded under their separate junior organization Junnu Hokki 68 ry to play in III-divisioona, fifth-highest tier of ice hockey in the country. In April of 2026, Hokki was moved under a new owner called HC Hokki Kajaani ry (independent, in cooperation with Hokki's separate junior organization).

== Cooperations ==
One of the key factors to the team's surviving and at-times success in Mestis was the co-operation contract with Kärpät and the army unit of Kainuu Brigade. Co-operation with Kärpät made player exchange happen between SM-liiga and Mestis, which enhanced player development as young players from Kärpät and its junior teams could gain experience playing amongst men in Hokki. In turn, the players in Hokki got the opportunity to train and play with Kärpät, which enhanced their chances of playing hockey in Finland's elite tier. Examples of players switching between teams includes players like Antti Kalapudas, Antti Ylönen, Janne Pesonen, Jyri Junnila, Tuomas Tarkki, and Tommi Paakkolanvaara.

Hokki and Kainuu Brigade made possible for young players to do their mandatory military service while training and playing competitive ice hockey.
