= Mestis =

Finnish ice hockey league

- Upcoming season or competition: 2026-27 Mestis season
- Formerly: I-Divisioona
- Sport: Ice hockey
- Founded: 2000; 26 years ago
- Founder: Finnish Ice Hockey Association
- First season: 2000–01
- Motto: Suomen viihdyttävintä lätkää (Finland’s most entertaining hockey)
- No. of teams: 9
- Country: Finland
- Most recent champion: Jokerit (2025–26)
- Most titles: Jukurit (7)
- Broadcaster: C More
- Level on pyramid: Level 2
- Promotion to: SM-liiga
- Relegation to: Suomi-sarja
- Domestic cup: Finnish Cup
- Related competitions: Naisten Mestis
- Website: Mestis.fi

Mestis (from Finnish: Mestaruussarja, meaning 'Championship series', stylized as MEST1S) is the second-highest men's ice hockey league in Finland. The league was established by the Finnish Ice Hockey Association in 2000 to replace the I-divisioona ('First Division').

Promotion to the SM-liiga is achievable for a Mestis team if it defeats an SM-liiga club in the qualification series and meets all the criteria established by the SM-liiga. However, Mestis is an open league that allows for relegation and promotion with the third league, Suomi-sarja.

Mestis is also the highest league under the governance of the FIHA.

== History ==
In the years 2000–2008, it was not practically possible for Mestis teams to get promoted to the SM-liiga, which was closed in 2000, but it was possible to drop down to the Suomi-sarja instead. However, KalPa was promoted to the SM-liiga in the spring of 2005, when the number of teams in the league was increased from 13 to 14 teams. For the 2008–2009 season, the SM-liiga qualifiers were brought back for a few seasons, but in the 2013–2014 season, the qualifiers were removed again. After the elimination of the qualifiers, Sport, KooKoo and Jukurit have been promoted to the SM-liiga through the license system. The promotion and relegation between the SM-liiga was brought back for the 2024–25 season.

Mestis got a new team, HK Zemgale/LLU, from Latvia for the 2022–23 season. HK Zemgale had never played in a Finnish league before and was added to Mestis to bring more entertainment and internationalization to Finnish ice hockey.

According to Mestis themselves, they are talking with other international clubs about joining the Mestis league.

== Clubs ==
Finnish teams in Mestis 2024–25

The team names are usually the traditional name of the club. All clubs are commonly known by the name of their team. Oy and Ab are the abbreviations for limited company in Finnish and Swedish respectively.

Team name	Club's registered name	Location	Home venue, capacity	Titles Mestis
Hermes	Kokkolan Hermes Oy	Kokkola	Kokkola Ice Hall, 4,200	0
IPK	IPK Hockey Oy	Iisalmi	Kankaan jäähalli, 1,358	1
JoKP	Joensuun Kiekko-Pojat Oy	Joensuu	Mehtimäki Ice Hall 4,039	0
Ketterä	Imatran Ketterä Oy	Imatra	OmaSp Areena, 1,200	3
KeuPa HT	KeuPa Hockey Oy	Keuruu	Keuruu Ice Hall, 1,100	1
Kiekko-Vantaa	Kiekko-Vantaa Hockey Oy	Vantaa	Tikkurila Ice Hall, 2,004	0
RoKi	RoKi Hockey Oy	Rovaniemi	Lappi Areena, 3,500	0
TUTO Hockey	TUTO Hockey Oy	Turku	Kupittaa multipurpose hall, 3,000	1

=== Past participants ===
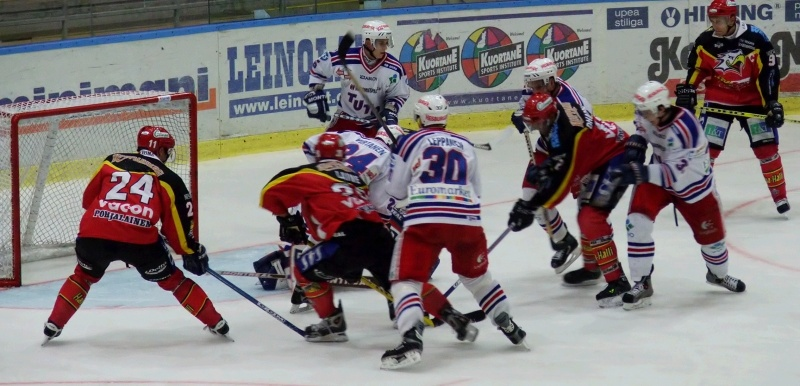
Vaasan Sport vs TuTo in 2005

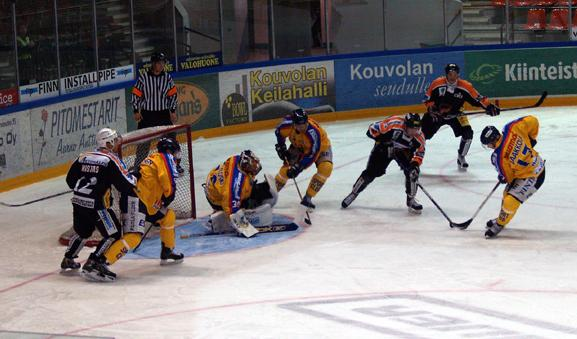
KooKoo vs Jukurit in 2007

- Jää-Kotkat, relegated to the Suomi-sarja in 2003.
- Hyvinkään Ahmat, relegated to the Suomi-sarja in 2004.
- KalPa, promoted to the SM-liiga in 2005.
- Haukat, resigned in 2006.
- HC Salamat, relegated to the Suomi-sarja in 2008.
- Kotkan Titaanit relegated to the Suomi-sarja in 2009.
- Kiekko-Laser went bankrupt in 2011.
- Vaasan Sport, promoted to the SM-liiga in 2014.
- HC Keski-Uusimaa was abandoned serial place in 2014.
- KooKoo, promoted to the SM-liiga in 2015.
- Jukurit, promoted to the SM-liiga in 2016.
- JYP-Akatemia, relegated to the Suomi-sarja and folded in 2017.
- Espoo United, went bankrupt in 2018.
- LeKi, did not receive a license in 2019.
- SaPKo, went bankrupt in 2022.
- HK Zemgale/LBTU, will not play in Mestis for the season 2023-24.
- Peliitat, went bankrupt in 2023 and did not receive a license to Mestis.
- FPS, relegated to the Suomi-sarja in 2024.
- Kiekko-Espoo, promoted to the SM-liiga in 2024.
- KOOVEE, went bankrupt in 2024.
- Hokki, went bankrupt in 2025.
- Jokerit, promoted to the SM-liiga in 2026.

=== Mestis timeline ===
2000–01	2001–02	2002–03	2003–04	2004–05	2005–06	2006–07	2007–08	2008–09	2009–10	2010–11	2011–12	2012–13	2013–14	2014–15	2015–16	2016–17	2017–18	2018–19	2019–20	2020–21	2021–22	2022–23	2023-24	2024-25	2025-26
K-Vantaa
TuTo											TUTO Hockey														
Jukurit																									
KooKoo																									
Sport																									
FPS																									
Hermes																									
Haukat																									
Ahmat																									
UJK																									
Diskos								D Team			JYP-Akatemia														
Jokipojat																				JoKP					
	KalPa																								
		Hokki																	Hokki						
			HCK Salamat																						
						HeKi						Peliitat													
						SaPKo																			
						KOOVEE																			
							LeKi																		
							Titaanit																		
									RoKi																
										K-Laser															
												HCK													
														KeuPa HT											
																IPK									
																Espoo United									
																	Ketterä								
																				K-Espoo					
																						HK Zemgale			
																							Jokerit		
																									Pyry Hockey

== Winners ==
Year	Champion	Silver	Bronze	Regular Season Winner
2001	Jukurit	TuTo	Hermes	TuTo
2002	Jukurit	KooKoo	KalPa	Jukurit
2003	Jukurit	K-Vantaa	KooKoo	Jukurit
2004	KalPa	Jukurit	Hermes	Jukurit
2005	KalPa	Sport	TuTo	KalPa
2006	Jukurit	Sport	TuTo	Jukurit
2007	Hokki	Jukurit	Sport	Sport
2008	TuTo	Hokki	Jukurit	TuTo
2009	Sport	Jokipojat	Hokki	Jokipojat
2010	Jokipojat	D-Team	KooKoo	KooKoo
2011	Sport	Jukurit	D-Team	Jukurit
2012	Sport	Jokipojat	KooKoo	Jukurit
2013	Jukurit	KooKoo	TUTO Hockey	Jukurit
2014	KooKoo	Jukurit	TUTO Hockey	TUTO Hockey
2015	Jukurit	KooKoo	Hokki	Jukurit
2016	Jukurit	Hokki	Jokipojat	Jukurit
2017	SaPKo	K-Vantaa	Espoo-United	SaPKo
2018	KeuPa HT	TUTO Hockey	SaPKo	KeuPa HT
2019	Ketterä	KeuPa HT	TUTO Hockey	Hermes
2020	Season was not finished due to the COVID-19 pandemic. No medals were awarded.			Ketterä
2021	Ketterä	Hermes	IPK	Kiekko-Espoo
2022	Ketterä	Kiekko-Espoo	RoKi	Ketterä
2023	Kiekko-Espoo	Ketterä	RoKi	Kiekko-Espoo
2024	IPK	Ketterä	Kiekko-Espoo	IPK
2025	Jokerit	IPK	K-Vantaa	Jokerit
2026	Jokerit	Ketterä	K-Vantaa	Jokerit

Medal table:

team	Gold	Silver	Bronze
Jukurit	7	4	1
Sport	3	2	1
Ketterä	3	2	0
KalPa	2	0	1
Jokerit	2	0	0
KooKoo	1	3	3
TUTO Hockey	1	2	5
Hokki	1	2	2
Jokipojat	1	2	1
K-Espoo	1	1	1
KeuPa HT	1	1	0
IPK	1	0	1
SaPKo	1	0	1
K-Vantaa	0	2	2
Hermes	0	1	2
JYP-Akatemia	0	1	1
RoKi	0	0	2
Espoo United	0	0	1
