= 2020–21 Mestis season =

2020–21 Mestis
- League: Mestis
- Sport: Ice hockey
- Duration: September 2020 – April 2021
- Number of teams: 14

Regular season
- Best record: K-Espoo
- Runners-up: JoKP
- Top scorer: Joonas Larinmaa (KeuPa HT)

Playoffs
- Playoffs MVP: Marlo Koponen (Ketterä)
- Finals champions: Ketterä
- Runners-up: Hermes

Mestis seasons
- ← 2019–20 2021–22 →

The 2020–21 Mestis season was the 21st season of Mestis, the second highest level of ice hockey in Finland after Liiga. Due to promotion/relegation games being cancelled due to COVID-19 pandemic in the last season both semi-finalists from last seasons Suomi-sarja (K-Espoo and FPS) were promoted to Mestis. Therefore, this seasons consisted of 14 teams.

== Clubs ==
Team	City	Home arena, capacity	Founded	Head coach
FPS	Forssa	Forssa Ice Hall, 3,000	1931	(Finland) Asko Rantanen
Hermes	Kokkola	Kokkolan jäähalli, 4,200	1953	(Finland) Jere Härkälä
Hokki	Kajaani	Kajaanin jäähalli, 2,372	1968	(Finland) Niko Eronen
IPK	Iisalmi	Kankaan jäähalli, 1,358	1966	(Finland) Niko Härkönen
JoKP	Joensuu	PKS Areena, 4,800	1953	(Finland) ~~Joni Petrell~~ 19.1.2021 (Finland) Benjamin Laurinkari
Ketterä	Imatra	Imatra Spa Areena, 1,200	1957	(Finland) Maso Lehtonen
KeuPa HT	Keuruu	Keuruun Jäähalli, 1,100	1995	(Finland) Tomas Westerlund
K-Espoo	Espoo	Espoo Metro Areena, 6,982	2018	(Finland) Janne Tuunanen
K-Vantaa	Vantaa	Trio Areena, 2,004	1994	(Finland) Mika Niskanen
KOOVEE	Tampere	Tampere Ice Stadium, 7,300	1929	(Finland) Juuso Hahl
Peliitat	Heinola	Versowood Areena, 2,686	1984	(Finland) Vesa Petäjä
RoKi	Rovaniemi	Lappi Areena, 3,500	1979	(Finland) Santeri Immonen
SaPKo	Savonlinna	Talvisalo ice rink, 2,833	1929	(Finland) Pasi Räsänen
TUTO Hockey	Turku	Kupittaan jäähalli, 3,000	1929	(Finland) Antti Virtanen

== Regular season ==
Initially the plan was to have each team play 50 games in total but due to the season being on hold from 2 December 2020 to 10 February 2021 the teams were unable to play the full season. Due to this points-per-game determines the order of the teams. SaPKo and RoKi decided not to continue the season when it resumed in February 2021.

Top six advanced straight to the quarter-finals, while teams between 7th and 10th positions played a wild card round for the final two spots. Since the highest series of Finnish hockey is a closed series no team will be promoted to Liiga.

Pos	Team	Pld	W	D	L	GF	GA	GD	W+	Pts	PPG	Final Result
1	K-Espoo	31	17	6	8	108	84	24	3	60	1.94	Advance to Quarterfinals
2	JoKP	31	17	5	9	107	89	18	3	59	1.90	Advance to Quarterfinals
3	Ketterä	31	17	5	9	130	92	38	1	57	1.84	Advance to Quarterfinals
4	KeuPa HT	31	17	4	10	112	102	10	2	57	1.84	Advance to Quarterfinals
5	IPK	30	14	6	10	108	94	14	5	53	1.77	Advance to Quarterfinals
6	KOOVEE	28	13	3	12	89	93	−4	2	44	1.57	Advance to Quarterfinals
7	K-Vantaa	29	11	7	11	89	85	4	2	42	1.45	Advance to Wild-card round
8	TUTO Hockey	30	11	6	13	98	104	−6	3	42	1.40	Advance to Wild-card round
9	Hermes	30	8	9	13	86	96	−10	4	37	1.23	Advance to Wild-card round
10	Peliitat	31	9	5	17	92	113	−21	4	36	1.16	Advance to Wild-card round
11	FPS	30	10	1	19	77	103	−26	1	32	1.07	
12	Hokki	30	6	7	17	79	107	−28	2	27	0.90	
13	SaPKo	18	6	5	7	62	68	−6	4	27	1.50	Did not finish the season
14	RoKi	18	7	3	8	57	64	−7	0	24	1.33	Did not finish the season

Source: Liiga

Rules for classification: 1) Points-per-game; 2) Goal difference; 3) Goals scored; 4) Head-to-head points; 5) Penalty minutes.

== Playoffs ==
Playoffs are being played in four stages. Each stage before the final is a best-of-3 series, with the final being a best-of-5 series. The teams are reseeded after the quarterfinals, so that the best team by regular season performance to make the semifinals faces the worst team in the semifinals.

=== Bracket ===
Wild-card round (best-of-3)
7	K-Vantaa	2
10	Peliitat	0
8	TUTO Hockey	1
9	Hermes	2

Quarter-finals (best-of-3)
1	K-Espoo	0
9	Hermes	2
2	JoKP	2
7	K-Vantaa	1
3	Ketterä	2
6	KOOVEE	0
4	KeuPa HT	1
5	IPK	2

Semi-finals (best-of-3)
2	JoKP	0
9	Hermes	2
(Pairings are re-seeded after the first and second round)
3	Ketterä	2
5	IPK	0

Finals (best-of-5)
3	Ketterä	3
9	Hermes	2
Bronze medal game
2	JoKP	0
5	IPK	4

=== Wild-card round ===
K-Vantaa – Peliitat 2-0
30.3.2021	K-Vantaa	Peliitat	6-2 ref
1.4.2021	Peliitat	K-Vantaa	1-3 ref
K-Vantaa wins the series 2-0.

TUTO Hockey – Hermes 1-2
30.3.2021	TUTO Hockey	Hermes	5-6 ref
1.4.2021	Hermes	TUTO Hockey	1-3 OT2 ref
3.4.2021	TUTO Hockey	Hermes	3-4 OT1 ref
Hermes wins the series 2-1.

=== Quarter-finals ===
K-Espoo – Hermes 0-2
6.4.2021	K-Espoo	Hermes	4-5 OT1 ref
8.4.2021	Hermes	K-Espoo	2-1 OT1 ref
Hermes wins the series 2-0.

JoKP – K-Vantaa 2-1
6.4.2021	JoKP	K-Vantaa	6-3 ref
8.4.2021	K-Vantaa	JoKP	5-4 ref
10.4.2021	JoKP	K-Vantaa	4-2 ref
JoKP wins the series 2-1.

Ketterä – KOOVEE 2-0
6.4.2021	Ketterä	KOOVEE	5-3 ref
8.4.2021	KOOVEE	Ketterä	1-4 ref
Ketterä wins the series 2-0.

KeuPa HT – IPK 1-2
6.4.2021	KeuPa HT	IPK	2-3 ref
8.4.2021	IPK	KeuPa HT	0-4 ref
10.4.2021	KeuPa HT	IPK	3-4 OT1 ref
IPK wins the series 2-1.

=== Semi-finals ===
JoKP – Hermes 0-2
13.4.2021	JoKP	Hermes	2-3 ref
15.4.2021	Hermes	JoKP	3-1 ref
Hermes wins the series 2-0.

Ketterä – IPK 2-0
13.4.2021	Ketterä	IPK	4-3 ref
15.4.2021	IPK	Ketterä	5-6 OT1 ref
Ketterä wins the series 2-0.

=== Bronze medal game ===
21 April 2021; 18:30	JoKP	0–4 (0–1, 0–1, 0–2)	IPK	PKS Areena, Joensuu; Attendance: 20

Game reference

Leevi Nikkinen
Goalies
Samu Pakarinen
Referees:
Jani Pesonen
Ville-Veikko Väkeväinen
Linesmen:
Joonas Hurskainen
Markus Peltola

0–1	03:33 – A. Ahola (B. Maia, J. Hämäläinen)
0–2	33:17 – M. Juusola (T. Kokkola, V. Järvinen)
0–3	46:19 – J. Hämäläinen (J. Nevalainen)
0–4	56:36 – N. Koskinen (J. Nevalainen) (ENG)

14 min
Penalties
4 min
16
Shots
30

=== Finals ===
20 April 2021; 18:30	Ketterä	2–3 (1–1, 1–0, 0–2)	Hermes	Imatra Spa Areena, Imatra; Attendance: 6

Game reference

Santeri Lipiäinen
Goalies
Joel Blomqvist
Referees:
Antti Hölli
Pasi Nieminen
Linesmen:
Marko Aalto
Janne Laukkala

	0–1	11:50 – J. Ketola (A. Lausniemi, J. Ahlgren)
A. Rämö (N. Ahoniemi) – 13:22	1–1
N. Ahoniemi (R. Mäkitalo, S. Forsblom) (PP1) – 20:28	2–1
	2–2	49:05 – A. Karjalainen (E. Ahopelto, E. Paasovaara)
	2–3	57:07 – O. Uomala (A. Lausniemi, J. Reini) (PP1)

6 min
Penalties
4 min
48
Shots
29

22 April 2021; 18:30	Hermes	2–7 (1–3, 1–0, 0–4)	Ketterä	Kokkolan jäähalli, Kokkola; Attendance: 20

Game reference

Joel Blomqvist
Goalies
Santeri Lipiäinen
Referees:
Jonne Mäkisalo
Joona Vares
Linesmen:
Petteri Niemelä
Miro Skinnarla

	0–1	01:39 – N. Ahoniemi
J. Rautiainen (J. Reini, E. Ahopelto) – 06:04	1–1
	1–2	11:09 – M. Varttinen
	1–3	16:45 – N. Ahoniemi (R. Mäkitalo, M. Tiihonen) (PP1)
J. Ahlgren (H. Limma, T. Tuupanen) – 35:34	2–3
	2–4	51:15 – E. Luhanka (R. Mäkitalo)
	2–5	56:53 – J. Viskari (J-M Alanen, J. Liuksiala) (ENG)
	2–6	58:14 – R. Mäkitalo (ENG)
	2–7	59:59 – E. Luhanka (J. Hänninen, P. Kiesilä) (PP1)

12 min
Penalties
4 min
26
Shots
32

24 April 2021; 17:00	Ketterä	5–9 (4–2, 0–2, 1–5)	Hermes	Imatra Spa Areena, Imatra; Attendance: 6

Game reference

Santeri Lipiäinen
Severi Auvinen
Goalies
Vilho Heikkinen
Joel Blomqvist
Referees:
Pasi Nieminen
Antti Hölli
Linesmen:
Janne Laukkala
Marko Aalto

S. Tanhua – 03:53	1–0
R. Mäkitaloa (A. Rämö, M. Tiihonen) – 05:50	2–0
	2–1	07:06 – E. Ahopelto (E. Paasovaara, E. Takala) (PP1)
H. Karjalainen (V. Paalanen) – 11:10	3–1
J. Viskari (J. Liuksiala, M. Koponen) – 15:50	4–1
	4–2	19:34 – H. Limma (E. Ahopelto)
	4–3	34:08 – S. Vesterinen (V. Heikkala, A. Lausniemi)
	4–4	39:18 – H. Harju (S. Vesterinen, Z. Sedlák)
	4–5	41:46 – E. Takala (E. Paasovaara, E. Ahopelto) (PP1)
	4–6	43:28 – H. Harju (O. Uomala, Z. Sedlák)
	4–7	46:05 – E. Ahopelto (E. Paasovaara, J. Ketola)
	4–8	49:59 – V. Heikkala (J. Reini, A. Lausniemi)
	4–9	51:21 – J. Ahlgren (H. Limma)
S. Tanhua (P. Kiesilä) – 56:28	5–9

35 min
Penalties
8 min
29
Shots
29

27 April 2021; 18:30	Hermes	3–4 2OT (1–2, 1–1, 1–0, 0–0, 0–1)	Ketterä	Kokkolan jäähalli, Kokkola; Attendance: 20

Game reference

Joel Blomqvist
Goalies
Santeri Lipiäinen
Referees:
Jonne Mäkitalo
Joona Vares
Linesmen:
Petteri Niemelä
Miro Skinnarla

Z. Sedlák (H. Harju, V. Meisaari) – 06:44	1–0
	1–1	09:11 – M. Haaparanta (J-M Alanen, N. Ahoniemi)
	1–2	09:59 – J. Viskari (J. Hallikas, J. Liuksiala)
	1–3	21:41 – M. Tiihonen (H. Karjalainen)
Z. Sedlák (O. Uomala, J. Reini) (PP1) – 35:46	2–3
Z. Sedlák (A. Lausniemi, O. Uomala) (PP1) – 41:03	3–3
	3–4	91:15 – R. Mäkitalo (S. Forsblom)

8 min
Penalties
10 min
49
Shots
47

29 April 2021; 18:30	Ketterä	8–3 (3–2, 4–0, 1–1)	Hermes	Imatra Spa Areena, Imatra; Attendance: 6

Game reference

Santeri Lipiäinen
Goalies
Joel Blomqvist
Vilho Heikkinen
Referees:
Joona Vares
Jonne Mäkisalo
Linesmen:
Miro Skinnarla
Petteri Niemelä

H. Karjalainen (R. Reini, M. Koponen) – 00:46	1–0
R. Mäkitalo (A. Rämö, M. Tiihonen) – 02:32	2–0
J-M Alanen (M. Haaparanta, N. Ahoniemi) – 03:08	3–0
	3–1	06:26 – J. Ahlgren (E. Ahopelto)
	3–2	18:17 – O. Uomala (H. Harju, Z. Sedlák) (PP1)
R. Mäkitalo (S. Forsblom) (SH1) – 25:46	4–2
R. Mäkitalo (A. Rämö, R. Reini) (PP1) – 27:23	5–2
H. Karjalainen (R. Reini) (PP1) – 28:31	6–2
H. Karjalainen (J-M Alanen, N. Ahoniemi) – 31:11	7–2
	7–3	47:51 – T. Tuupanen (A. Lausniemi, J. Ketola)
M. Haaparanta (J-M Alanen, N. Ahoniemi) – 50:16	8–3

8 min
Penalties
14 min
30
Shots
38

Ketterä wins the finals 3–2.

== See also ==
- 2020–21 Liiga season
