= 2019–20 Mestis season =

2019–20 Mestis
- League: Mestis
- Sport: Ice hockey
- Duration: September 2019 – March 2020
- Number of teams: 12

Regular season
- Best record: Ketterä
- Runners-up: IPK
- Top scorer: Jaakko Lantta (Ketterä)

Playoffs

Mestis seasons
- ← 2018–19 2020–21 →

The 2019–20 Mestis season was the 20th season of Mestis, the second highest level of ice hockey in Finland after Liiga. LeKi lost their Mestis place due to financial difficulties and due to that Hokki was promoted to Mestis for this season. The playoffs and relegations were cancelled due to the COVID-19 pandemic.

== Clubs ==
Mestis team map

Team	City	Home arena, capacity	Founded	Head coach
Hermes	Kokkola	Kokkolan jäähalli, 4,200	1953	(Finland) ~~Janne Tuunanen~~3.2.2020 (Finland) Ari-Pekka Pajuluoma
Hokki	Kajaani	Kajaanin jäähalli, 2,372	1968	(Finland) Jarkko Heikkinen
IPK	Iisalmi	Kankaan jäähalli, 1,358	1966	(Finland) Niko Härkönen
Jokipojat	Joensuu	PKS Areena, 4,800	1953	(Finland) Joni Petrell
Ketterä	Imatra	Imatra Spa Areena, 1,200	1957	(Finland) Maso Lehtonen
KeuPa HT	Keuruu	Keuruun Jäähalli, 1,100	1995	(Finland) Niko Eronen
K-Vantaa	Vantaa	Trio Areena, 2,004	1994	(Finland) ~~Jesse Welling~~31.10.2019 (Finland) ~~Kari Haakana~~4.2.2020 (Finland) Jani Manninen
KOOVEE	Tampere	Tampere Ice Stadium, 7,300	1929	(Finland) Miikka Kuusela
Peliitat	Heinola	Versowood Areena, 2,686	1984	(Finland) Vesa Petäjä
RoKi	Rovaniemi	Lappi Areena, 3,500	1979	(Finland) Santeri Immonen
SaPKo	Savonlinna	Talvisalo ice rink, 2,833	1929	(Finland) Pasi Räsänen
TUTO Hockey	Turku	Marli Areena, 3,000	1929	(Finland) Antti Virtanen

== Regular season ==
Pos	Team	Pld	W	OTW	OTL	L	GF	GA	GD	Pts
1	Ketterä	50	26	8	5	11	188	127	+61	99
2	IPK	50	22	10	4	14	197	166	+31	90
3	Jokipojat	50	24	3	6	17	179	168	+11	84
4	SaPKo	50	22	6	5	17	167	160	+7	83
5	KOOVEE	50	21	7	5	17	198	183	+15	82
6	KeuPa HT	50	20	5	8	17	189	182	+7	78
7	TUTO Hockey	50	20	5	7	18	167	160	+7	77
8	Hermes	50	21	2	7	20	164	160	+4	74
9	K-Vantaa	50	18	4	6	22	169	169	0	68
10	RoKi	50	13	8	8	21	159	171	−12	63
11	Peliitat	50	14	6	5	25	150	187	−37	59
12	Hokki	50	10	5	3	32	122	216	−94	43

Source: EliteProspects.com

Rules for classification: 1) Points; 2) Goal difference; 3) Goals scored; 4) Head-to-head points; 5) Penalty minutes.

== See also ==
- 2019–20 Liiga season
