= 2025–26 Mestis season =

- League: Mestis
- Sport: Ice hockey
- Defending champions: Jokerit (2024–25)
- Duration: September 2025 – April 2026
- Games: 49
- Teams: 10
- TV partner: MTV

Regular Season
- Best record: Jokerit
- Runners-up: IPK
- Promoted to Liiga: 1st Jokerit, 2nd TBD

Playoffs
- Champions: Jokerit
- Runners-up: Ketterä

Mestis seasons
- ← 2024–25 2026–27 →

The 2025–26 Mestis season is the 26th season of Mestis, the second level of ice hockey in Finland. 10 teams participates in the league and each will play 49 games during the regular season.

The regular season is followed by playoffs, promotion and relegation series. The winner of the playoffs will be declared the Champion of Mestis and will participate in the promotion series to Liiga. Those teams finishing ninth and tenth will play a series to avoid relegation to Suomi-sarja.

== Clubs ==
Updated 13 May 2025.

Team	City	Home arena, capacity	Founded	Head coach
Hermes	Kokkola	Kokkolan jäähalli, 4,200	1953	(Sweden) Anders Eriksén
IPK	Iisalmi	Kankaan jäähalli, 1380	1966	(Finland) Marko Tuomainen
Jokerit	Helsinki	Helsinki Ice Hall, 8,200; Veikkaus Arena, 13,349	1967	(Finland) Tomek Valtonen
JoKP	Joensuu	Mehtimäki Ice Hall, 4,800	1953	(Finland) Juha-Matti Kemppainen
Ketterä	Imatra	Imatra Spa Areena, 1,300	1957	(Finland) Janne Tuunanen
KeuPa HT	Keuruu	Keuruun Jäähalli, 1,100	1995	(Finland) Niko Raiskio
Kiekko-Vantaa	Vantaa	Trio Areena, 3,700	1994	(Finland) Jani Manninen
Pyry Hockey	Nokia	Kattokeskus Areena, 1,100	1905	(Finland) Toni Rautakorpi
RoKi	Rovaniemi	Lappi Areena, 3,500	1979	(Finland) Mikko Sirento-Manninen
TUTO Hockey	Turku	Rajupaja Areena, 3,000	1929	(Finland) Samuli Marjeta

== Team changes ==
The following team changes have happened for the 2025–26 season:

=== To Mestis ===
Promoted from Suomi-sarja

- Pyry Hockey

Relegated from Liiga

- None

=== From Mestis ===
Promoted to Liiga

- Jokerit

Relegated to Suomi-sarja

- Hokki (bankrupt)

== Regular season ==
The regular season consists of 49 matches.

Pos	Team	Pld	W	OTW	OTL	L	GF	GA	GD	Pts	Final Result
1	Jokerit	49	30	7	4	8	172	95	+77	108	Advance to Quarterfinals
2	IPK	49	23	7	6	13	175	143	+32	89	Advance to Quarterfinals
3	Ketterä	49	17	9	8	15	152	141	+11	77	Advance to Quarterfinals
4	K-Vantaa	49	20	4	8	17	149	148	+1	76	Advance to Quarterfinals
5	TUTO Hockey	49	20	2	10	17	145	134	+11	74	Advance to Quarterfinals
6	RoKi	49	19	4	7	19	150	155	−5	72	Advance to Quarterfinals
7	Hermes	49	18	6	1	24	147	170	−23	67	Advance to Quarterfinals
8	JoKP	49	15	7	7	20	146	161	−15	66	Advance to Quarterfinals
9	Pyry Hockey	49	14	5	5	25	141	181	−40	57	Advance to Relegation series
10	KeuPa HT	49	11	7	2	29	132	181	−49	49	Advance to Relegation series

Source: Mestis

Rules for classification: 1) Total points; 2) Goal difference; 3) Goals scored; 4) Head-to-head points; 5) Penalty minutes

== Playoffs ==
Playoffs are being played in three stages. Quarter-Finals with the semifinals and the finals being a best-of-7 series. The teams are reseeded after the first two stages, so that the best team by regular season performance to make the quarter-finals and the semifinals faces the worst team in the corresponding stage. The bronze medal will be decided in a single game.

=== Bracket ===
Quarter-finals (best-of-7)
1	Jokerit	4
8	JoKP	2
2	IPK	4
7	Hermes	1
3	Ketterä	4
6	RoKi	2
4	Kiekko-Vantaa	4
5	TUTO Hockey	1

Semi-finals (best-of-7)
1	Jokerit	4
4	Kiekko-Vantaa	0
2	IPK	2
3	Ketterä	4

Finals (best-of-7)
1	Jokerit	4
2	Ketterä	0
Bronze game
3	IPK	3
4	Kiekko-Vantaa	7

== Promotion ==
Due to the Liiga system reform, there will be no promotion this season. For the 2026–2027 Liiga season, the Mestis champion will be promoted alongside Jokerit, the champion of the 2024–2025 Mestis season. If Jokerit wins the current season as well, the runner-up from this season will be promoted instead.

== Playout and Relegation series ==
The bottom two teams from the regular season will compete in a playout series, with the winner securing their spot in Mestis. The loser will then face the Suomi-sarja champion in a relegation series to determine who will play in Mestis next season

Both the playout and the relegation series are played as a best-of-7 series.

=== Bracket ===
Playout series			Relegation series
9	Pyry Hockey	4
10	KeuPa HT	2	1	KeuPa HT	4
			2	Haukat	2
