= Marlo Koponen =

Finnish ice hockey player

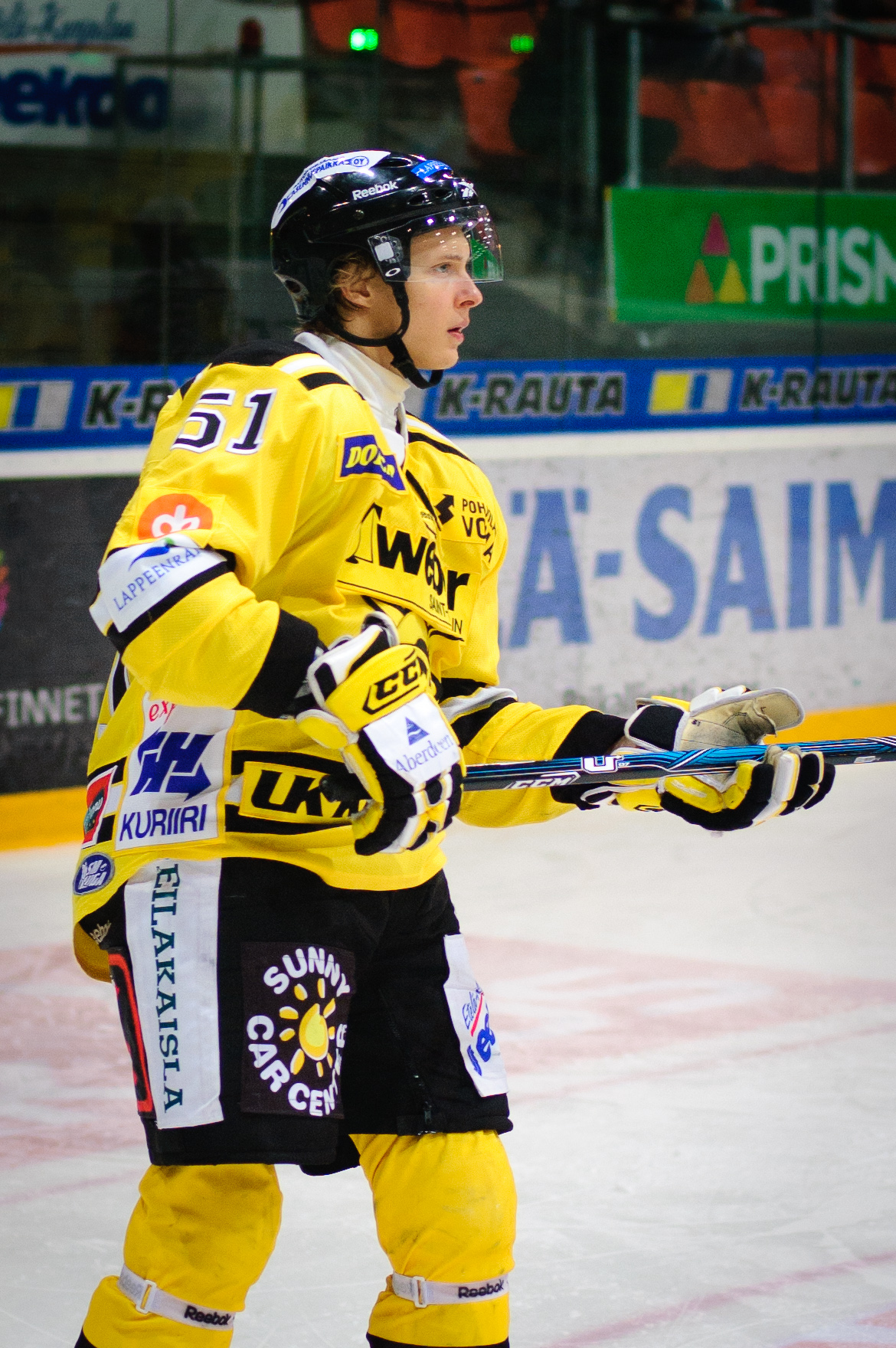
- Koponen in 2010
- Born: 13 December 1986 (age 38); Imatra, Finland
- Height: 6 ft 0 in (183 cm)
- Weight: 192 lb (87 kg; 13 st 10 lb)
- Position: Defence
- Shot: Left
- Played for: HeKi; SaiPa; Jukurit; TUTO Hockey; KooKoo; Gentofte Stars; Herning Blue Fox; Imatran Ketterä
- Playing career: 2007–2022

Marlo Koponen (born 13 December 1986) is a Finnish former ice hockey defenceman who last played in Finland for Imatran Ketterä of Mestis.

== Career statistics ==
			Regular season					Playoffs
Season	Team	League	GP	G	A	Pts	PIM	GP	G	A	Pts	PIM
2001–02	Wiener Eislöwen U20	Austria U20	1	0	0	0	0	—	—	—	—	—
2002–03	Coppell High	USHS-TX	17	3	4	7	32	—	—	—	—	—
2003–04	SaiPa U18	U18 SM-sarja	15	0	1	1	4	—	—	—	—	—
2004–05	SaiPa U18	U18 SM-sarja	19	1	4	5	59	—	—	—	—	—
2005–06	SaiPa U20	U20 SM-liiga	39	0	4	4	46	—	—	—	—	—
2006–07	SaiPa U20	U20 SM-liiga	42	2	10	12	68	—	—	—	—	—
2007–08	HeKi	Mestis	31	0	5	5	20	—	—	—	—	—
2008–09	SaiPa	SM-liiga	47	0	3	3	18	—	—	—	—	—
2009–10	SaiPa U20	U20 SM-liiga	1	0	0	0	0	—	—	—	—	—
2009–10	SaiPa	SM-liiga	37	0	1	1	16	—	—	—	—	—
2009–10	Mikkelin Jukurit	Mestis	5	0	0	0	2	—	—	—	—	—
2010–11	SaiPa	SM-liiga	19	0	2	2	12	—	—	—	—	—
2010–11	Mikkelin Jukurit	Mestis	16	0	2	2	42	2	0	0	0	0
2011–12	TUTO Hockey	Mestis	46	1	7	8	30	4	0	0	0	8
2012–13	TUTO Hockey	Mestis	45	0	14	14	44	11	1	2	3	24
2013–14	KooKoo	Mestis	50	1	9	10	50	17	0	6	6	20
2014–15	KooKoo	Mestis	47	1	11	12	95	19	1	1	2	22
2015–16	KooKoo	Liiga	45	2	2	4	28	—	—	—	—	—
2016–17	KooKoo	Liiga	13	1	0	1	10	—	—	—	—	—
2016–17	Gentofte Stars	Denmark	29	1	9	10	28	17	0	3	3	18
2017–18	Gentofte Stars	Denmark	40	2	15	17	72	—	—	—	—	—
2017–18	Herning Blue Fox	Denmark	9	0	3	3	10	8	0	0	0	6
2018–19	Imatran Ketterä	Mestis	32	4	12	16	36	14	1	2	3	4
2018–19	Mikkelin Jukurit	Liiga	19	0	4	4	14	—	—	—	—	—
2019–20	Imatran Ketterä	Mestis	37	5	19	24	44	—	—	—	—	—
2020–21	Imatran Ketterä	Mestis	23	0	7	7	28	9	0	4	4	4
2021–22	Imatran Ketterä	Mestis	10	1	4	5	4	—	—	—	—	—
SM-liiga totals			180	3	12	15	98	—	—	—	—	—
Mestis totals			342	13	90	103	395	76	3	15	18	82
