= Ilkka Pikkarainen =

Finnish ice hockey player

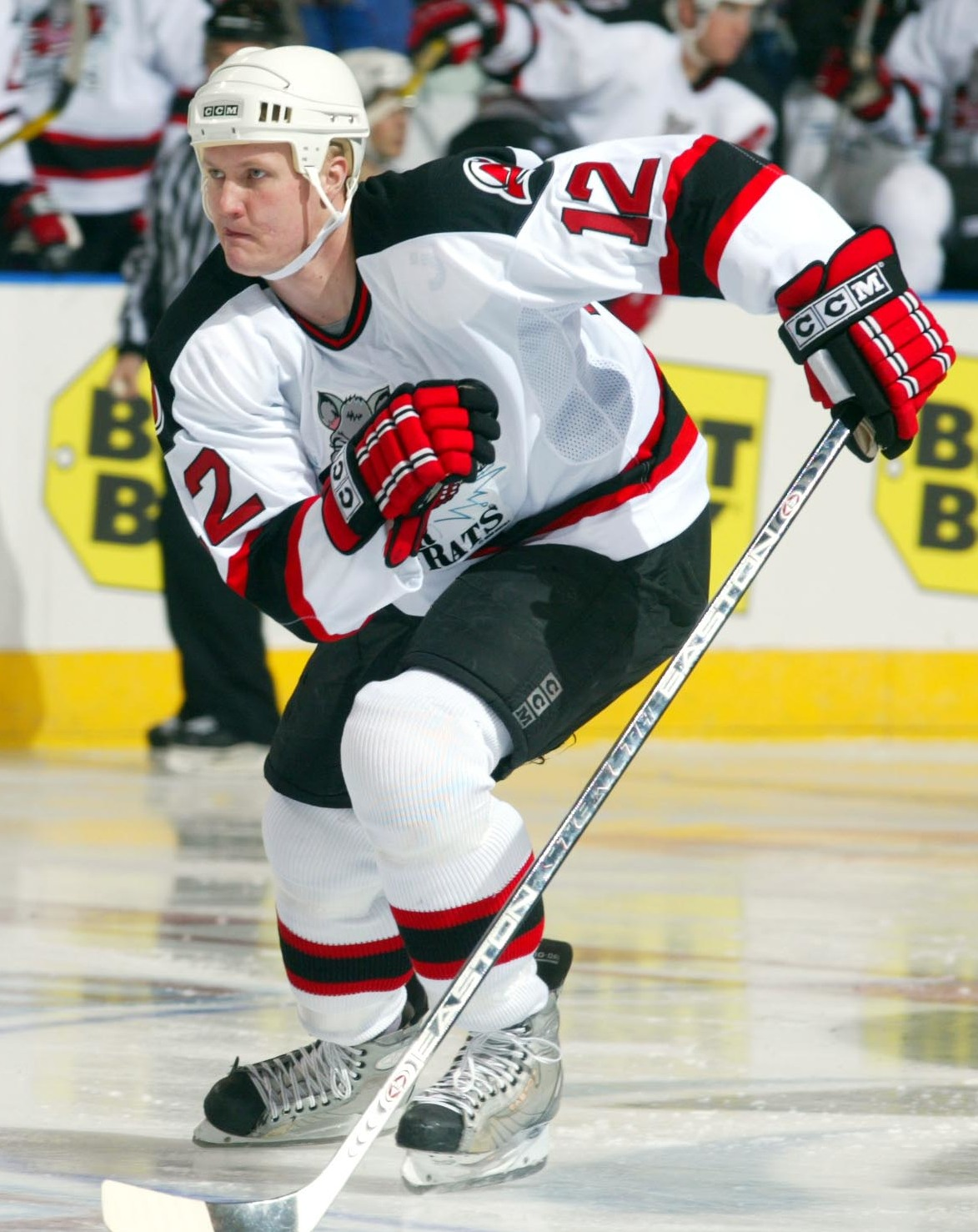
- Pikkarainen with the Albany River Rats in 2004
- Born: April 19, 1981 (age 45) Sonkajärvi, Finland
- Height: 6 ft 2 in (188 cm)
- Weight: 215 lb (98 kg; 15 st 5 lb)
- Position: Right wing
- Shot: Right
- Mestis team Former teams: IPK; HIFK; New Jersey Devils; HC CSKA Moscow; Timrå IK; Pelicans; TPS; KalPa
- NHL draft: 218th overall, 2002; New Jersey Devils
- Playing career: 2000–2020

Ilkka Pikkarainen (born April 19, 1981) is a Finnish ice hockey right winger who last played for IPK in Mestis. Most of his career has been spent in the Finnish Liiga, though he also played 31 games in the National Hockey League with the New Jersey Devils during the 2009–10 season.

== Career ==
Pikkarainen began his professional career in the SM-liiga with HIFK at the end of the 2000–01 season. He played there for two full seasons and was drafted by the New Jersey Devils in the seventh round of the 2002 NHL entry draft, 218th overall. Pikkarainen came over to North America to play for the Albany River Rats, the Devils' American Hockey League affiliate, starting in the 2003–04 season. After playing in the AHL for three seasons, Pikkarainen returned to play with HIFK for the 2008–09 season, where he played in 54 games and scored 24 goals, leading the team.

The Devils re-signed Pikkarainen at age 28 on July 2, 2009, intending to keep him on the NHL roster. After missing the Devils' first game of the 2009–10 season with the stomach flu, Pikkarainen made his NHL debut on October 5 against the New York Rangers, and later scored his first NHL goal against the Montreal Canadiens on December 16, 2009. In January 2010, Pikkarainen cleared waivers to play in the KHL for CSKA Moscow after the Devils had decided that he was unable to fully adjust to the NHL style, partially for health reasons.

In May 2010, Ilkka signed with Timrå IK in Sweden.

== Career statistics ==
			Regular season					Playoffs
Season	Team	League	GP	G	A	Pts	PIM	GP	G	A	Pts	PIM
1998–99	HIFK	FIN U18	24	6	12	18	26	2	1	0	1	27
1999–2000	HIFK	FIN U20	28	3	2	5	14	3	1	1	2	2
2000–01	HIFK	FIN U20	38	27	31	58	186	9	2	5	7	26
2000–01	HIFK	SM-liiga	4	0	0	0	8	2	0	0	0	0
2001–02	HIFK	SM-liiga	54	9	9	18	111	—	—	—	—	—
2002–03	HIFK	SM-liiga	47	11	12	23	40	—	—	—	—	—
2003–04	Albany River Rats	AHL	63	8	10	18	118	—	—	—	—	—
2004–05	Albany River Rats	AHL	71	12	12	24	102	—	—	—	—	—
2005–06	Albany River Rats	AHL	62	9	11	20	85	—	—	—	—	—
2006–07	HIFK	SM-liiga	53	17	20	37	140	5	0	1	1	2
2007–08	HIFK	SM-liiga	37	8	10	18	100	—	—	—	—	—
2008–09	HIFK	SM-liiga	54	24	13	37	149	2	0	0	0	0
2009–10	New Jersey Devils	NHL	31	1	3	4	10	—	—	—	—	—
2009–10	Lowell Devils	AHL	1	0	0	0	0	—	—	—	—	—
2009–10	CSKA Moscow	KHL	6	0	2	2	0	—	—	—	—	—
2010–11	Timrå IK	SEL	50	15	13	28	119	—	—	—	—	—
2011–12	Timrå IK	SEL	27	5	5	10	18	—	—	—	—	—
2011–12	Pelicans	SM-liiga	11	6	4	10	20	16	1	3	4	38
2012–13	Pelicans	SM-liiga	48	6	13	19	135	—	—	—	—	—
2013–14	Pelicans	Liiga	49	7	8	15	61	8	1	3	4	2
2014–15	TPS	Liiga	57	7	14	21	103	—	—	—	—	—
2015–16	TPS	Liiga	39	12	12	24	35	6	2	1	3	27
2016–17	TPS	Liiga	45	11	14	25	18	—	—	—	—	—
2017–18	TPS	Liiga	52	8	11	19	98	10	0	0	0	22
2018–19	Ravensburg Towerstars	DEL2	31	7	9	16	96	—	—	—	—	—
2018–19	KalPa	Liiga	16	5	5	10	6	—	—	—	—	—
2019–20	IPK	Mestis	43	16	29	45	92	—	—	—	—	—
AHL totals			197	29	33	62	305	—	—	—	—	—
Liiga totals			566	131	145	276	1026	56	5	10	15	97
NHL totals			31	1	3	4	10	—	—	—	—	—
