= Mika Kononen =

Finnish ice hockey forward

- Born: March 26, 1971 (age 53); Iisalmi, Finland
- Height: 6 ft 3 in (191 cm)
- Weight: 203 lb (92 kg; 14 st 7 lb)
- Position: Forward
- Shot: Right
- Played for: KalPa
- Playing career: 1987–2003

Mika Kononen (born March 26, 1971) is a Finnish former professional ice hockey forward.

Kononen played one game in the SM-liiga for KalPa during the 1990–91 SM-liiga season. He spent the majority of his career with his hometown team IPK, from 1987 to 1990 and from 1992 to 1999.
