= Otto Huttunen =

Finnish ice hockey defenceman

- Born: May 7, 1991 (age 34) Iisalmi, Finland
- Height: 6 ft 2 in (188 cm)
- Weight: 216 lb (98 kg; 15 st 6 lb)
- Position: Defence
- Shoots: Right
- Liiga team: KalPa
- Playing career: 2012–present

Otto Huttunen (born May 7, 1991) is a Finnish professional ice hockey defenceman playing for KalPa of Liiga.

Huttunen previously played for Iisalmen Peli-Karhut and captained the team for three seasons in Mestis before joining KalPa on August 26, 2019. In his debut season in Liiga, Huttunen played 45 games and scored four goals and six assists. He re-signed with the team on March 25, 2020.
