= Mikko Haaparanta =

Finnish ice hockey forward

- Born: September 7, 1997 (age 27); Imatra, Finland
- Height: 6 ft 3 in (191 cm)
- Weight: 196 lb (89 kg; 14 st 0 lb)
- Position: Forward
- Shoots: Left
- Mestis team Former teams: Ketterä; SaiPa
- Playing career: 2016–present

Mikko Haaparanta (born September 7, 1997) is a Finnish professional ice hockey forward currently playing for Ketterä of Mestis.

On December 17, 2018, Haaparanta was loaned to SaiPa of Liiga. He played five games for SaiPa and scored no points.
