= Jesse Hallikas =

Finnish ice hockey left winger

- Born: April 14, 1997 (age 27); Imatra, Finland
- Height: 5 ft 8 in (173 cm)
- Weight: 179 lb (81 kg; 12 st 11 lb)
- Position: Left wing
- Shoots: Left
- Mestis team Former teams: Ketterä; SaiPa
- Playing career: 2016–present

Jesse Hallikas (born April 14, 1997) is a Finnish ice hockey left winger currently playing for Ketterä of Mestis.

Hallikas previously played nine games for SaiPa of Liiga during the 2016–17 season, scoring one goal. He signed for Ketterä on April 29, 2019.
