= Kokkola (disambiguation) =

Kokkola is a town in Finland.

Kokkola may also refer to:

== People ==
- Angela Kokkola (1932-2017), Greek politician
- Tatu Kokkola (born 1997), Finnish ice hockey player
- Veikko Kokkola (1911-1974), Finnish politician

== Sports ==
- GBK Kokkola, a Finnish football club
- Kokkola Futis 10, a Finnish women's football club
- Kokkolan Hermes, a Finnish ice hockey club
- Kokkolan Palloveikot, a Finnish football club
- Kokkolan Tiikerit, a Finnish volleyball team

== Other ==
- 1522 Kokkola, a main belt asteroid
- Kokkola-Pietarsaari Airport, airport in Kronoby, Finland
- Kokkola railway station, railway station in Kokkola
- Kokkola sub-region, a sub-region of Finland
- Port of Kokkola, port in Kokkola

== See also ==
- Kokkala (disambiguation)
