= Mikko Helisten =

Finnish ice hockey centre

- Born: June 17, 1975 (age 49); Oulu, Finland
- Height: 5 ft 8 in (173 cm)
- Weight: 161 lb (73 kg; 11 st 7 lb)
- Position: Centre
- Shot: Right
- Played for: Tappara
- Playing career: 1993–1999

Mikko Helisten (born June 15, 1975) is a Finnish former ice hockey centre.

Helisten played one season in the SM-liiga for Tappara during the 1995–96 season. He played 34 games and registered one assist. He also played in the 1. Divisioona for Oulun Kärpät, Junkkarit HT, Ketterä and KOOVEE.
