= Pyykkönen =

Pyykkönen is a Finnish surname. Notable people with the surname include:

- Samu Pyykkönen (born 1994), Finnish ice hockey player
- Tuulikki Pyykkönen (born 1963), Finnish cross-country skier
