= Heikki Mälkiä =

Finnish ice hockey player (1958–2026)

- Born: 7 March 1958 Imatra, Finland
- Died: 13 October 2026 (aged 68)
- Height: 173 cm (5 ft 8 in)
- Weight: 73 kg (161 lb; 11 st 7 lb)
- Position: Centre
- Shot: Left
- Played for: Imatran Ketterä; SaiPa; JYP Jyväskylä
- Playing career: 1974–1992

Heikki Mälkiä (7 March 1958 – 13 October 2026) was a Finnish ice hockey player who played as a centre.

His number 20 jersey was retired by his longtime club SaiPa.

Mälkiä died on 13 October 2026, at the age of 68.
