= Alanen =

Alanen is a Finnish surname. Notable people with the surname include:

- Emmi Alanen (born 1991), Finnish footballer
- Ivar Alanen (1863–1936), Finnish politician
- Jere-Matias Alanen (born 1996), Finnish professional ice hockey winger
- Lilli Alanen (1941–2021), Finnish philosopher
- Pekka Alanen (born 1945), Finnish wrestler
- Pirre Alanen (born 1965), Finnish restaurateur
