= Joel Blomqvist (ice hockey) =

Finnish ice hockey player (born 2002)

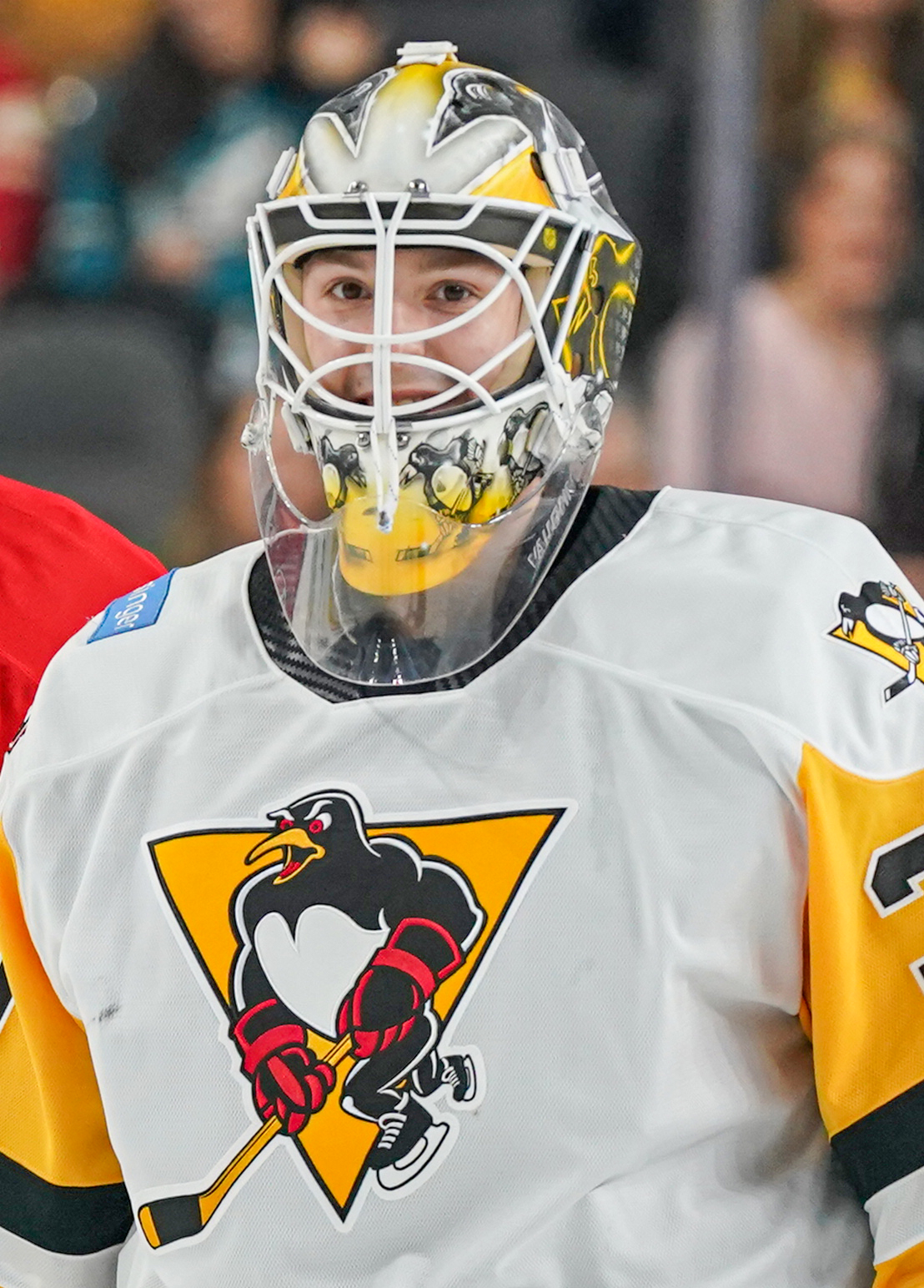
- Blomqvist in 2024
- Born: 10 January 2002 (age 24) Nykarleby, Finland
- Height: 6 ft 3 in (191 cm)
- Weight: 200 lb (91 kg; 14 st 4 lb)
- Position: Goaltender
- Catches: Left
- NHL team (P) Cur. team Former teams: Pittsburgh Penguins; WBS Penguins (AHL); Oulun Kärpät
- NHL draft: 52nd overall, 2020; Pittsburgh Penguins
- Playing career: 2019–present

Joel Blomqvist (born 10 January 2002) is a Finnish professional ice hockey goaltender who currently plays with the Wilkes-Barre/Scranton Penguins in the American Hockey League (AHL) while under contract as a prospect for the Pittsburgh Penguins of the National Hockey League (NHL).

== Playing career ==
On 7 December 2019, Blomqvist made his Liiga debut for Oulun Kärpät against HIFK. He made his first Liiga start on 26 December 2019 against JYP. In March 2020, Blomqvist signed a three-year contract with Kärpät.

On 1 October 2020, Blomqvist earned his first Liiga win. On 6 October, he was loaned to Kokkolan Hermes for the 2020–21 Mestis season. On 7 October, he was drafted in the second round of the 2020 NHL entry draft by the Pittsburgh Penguins with the 52nd overall pick.

On 16 October 2021, Blomqvist recorded his first Liiga shutout. On 15 April 2022, Blomqvist signed an amateur contract with the Wilkes-Barre/Scranton Penguins.

In October 2022, Blomqvist sustained a concussion after a collision with HIFK's Iiro Pakarinen. In December, after another collision, Blomqvist again suffered from concussion symptoms. He returned to play for Kärpät in March 2023. Blomqvist completed the 2022–23 Liiga season with Kärpät, posting a 6–5–8 record, 2.29 goals against average, .907 save percentage, and one shutout in 21 regular-season games; he then signed an amateur contract with Wilkes-Barre/Scranton on 4 April 2023. On 5 April 2023, he signed with Pittsburgh on a three-year, entry-level contract that would begin in the 2023–24 NHL season.

Blomqvist played with Wilkes-Barre/Scranton in the 2023–24 AHL season, and was selected to the AHL All-Star Game.

Blomqvist made his NHL debut on 10 October 2024, in Pittsburgh's 6–3 win against the Detroit Red Wings. Blomqvist played in 15 games for Pittsburgh in the 2024–25 NHL season, posting an .885 save percentage.

On 26 September 2025, the Penguins announced Blomqvist had suffered a lower-body injury, and would miss a minimum of four weeks.

== International play ==
Blomqvist represented the Finland junior team at the 2021 World Junior Ice Hockey Championships.

== Personal life ==
Blomqvist was born to parents Anders and Nina, and has an older brother, Emil.

Blomqvist is a Finnish Swede.

== Career statistics ==
=== Regular season and playoffs ===
			Regular season									Playoffs
Season	Team	League	GP	W	L	OT	MIN	GA	SO	GAA	SV%	GP	W	L	MIN	GA	SO	GAA	SV%
2018–19	Oulun Kärpät	Jr. A	11	—	—	—	—	—	—	—	.938	3	—	—	—	—	—	1.33	.947
2019–20	Oulun Kärpät	Jr. A	34	26	6	0	—	—	5	1.66	.931	1	0	1	59	3	0	3.03	.897
2019–20	Oulun Kärpät	Liiga	2	0	0	1	63	5	0	4.73	.808	—	—	—	—	—	—	—	—
2020–21	Oulun Kärpät	Jr. A	3	—	—	—	—	—	—	1.33	.941	—	—	—	—	—	—	—	—
2020–21	Oulun Kärpät	Liiga	2	2	0	0	120	3	0	1.50	.914	—	—	—	—	—	—	—	—
2020–21	Hermes	Mestis	16	6	4	6	965	43	1	2.67	.907	11	6	3	601	31	0	3.10	.908
2021–22	Oulun Kärpät	Jr. A	1	0	0	1	64	5	0	4.63	.868	—	—	—	—	—	—	—	—
2021–22	Oulun Kärpät	Liiga	20	6	3	5	952	21	5	1.32	.940	7	3	3	437	8	0	1.10	.950
2021–22	Hermes	Mestis	4	0	3	1	239	9	0	2.26	.882	—	—	—	—	—	—	—	—
2021–22	Wilkes-Barre/Scranton Penguins	AHL	1	0	1	0	59	2	0	2.05	.926	—	—	—	—	—	—	—	—
2022–23	Oulun Kärpät	Liiga	21	6	5	8	1181	45	1	2.29	.907	3	1	2	147	9	0	3.69	.848
2022–23	Wilkes-Barre/Scranton Penguins	AHL	1	0	1	0	60	4	0	4.00	.852	—	—	—	—	—	—	—	—
2023–24	Wilkes-Barre/Scranton Penguins	AHL	45	25	12	6	2636	95	1	2.16	.921	2	0	2	120	7	0	3.49	.894
2024–25	Wilkes-Barre/Scranton Penguins	AHL	18	8	7	3	1057	50	1	2.84	.914	1	0	1	39	3	0	4.60	.885
2024–25	Pittsburgh Penguins	NHL	15	4	9	1	772	49	0	3.81	.885	—	—	—	—	—	—	—	—
2025–26	Wilkes-Barre/Scranton Penguins	AHL	26	16	5	4	1527	61	1	2.40	.913	—	—	—	—	—	—	—	—
Liiga totals			45	14	8	14	2,316	74	6	1.92	.917	10	4	5	583	17	0	1.75	.922
NHL totals			15	4	9	1	772	49	0	3.81	.885	—	—	—	—	—	—	—	—

Medal record

Ice hockey

Representing Finland

World Junior Championships
Bronze medal – third place	2021 Canada	

=== International ===
Year	Team	Event	Result	GP	W	L	OT	MIN	GA	SO	GAA	SV%
2018	Finland	U17	2nd place, silver medalist(s)	5	2	3	0	313	17	0	3.26	.894
2019	Finland	HG18	4th	3	2	1	0	298	11	1	2.33	.919
2021	Finland	WJC	3rd place, bronze medalist(s)	—	—	—	—	—	—	—	—	—
Junior totals				8	4	4	0	611	28	1	2.75	.908

== Awards and honors ==
Award	Year	Ref
Jr. A
Champion (Oulun Kärpät)	2019	
First All-Star Team	2020	
Jorma Valtonen Award	2020	
Liiga
Best SVS% (940)	2022	
AHL
All-Star Game	2024	
Second All-Star Team	2024	
All-Rookie Team	2024	
