= Joni Yli-Torkko =

Finnish ice hockey player

- Born: April 14, 1982 (age 42); Lappeenranta, Finland
- Height: 5 ft 9 in (175 cm)
- Weight: 203 lb (92 kg; 14 st 7 lb)
- Position: Right wing
- Shot: Left
- Played for: Lukko Rauma; TPS Turku; SaiPa
- Playing career: 2000–2010

Joni Yli-Torkko (born April 14, 1982) is a Finnish former professional ice hockey forward who last played with SaiPa in the SM-liiga.

He has not played a game since the 2009–10 season due to a severe groin injury.

== Career statistics ==
			Regular season					Playoffs
Season	Team	League	GP	G	A	Pts	PIM	GP	G	A	Pts	PIM
1997–98	SaiPa U16	U16 SM-sarja Q	9	2	5	7	41	—	—	—	—	—
1997–98	SaiPa U16	U16 SM-sarja	20	8	18	26	42	—	—	—	—	—
1998–99	SaiPa U18	U18 SM-sarja	32	22	14	36	56	—	—	—	—	—
1999–00	SaiPa U18	U18 SM-sarja	7	5	1	6	8	—	—	—	—	—
1999–00	SaiPa U20	U20 I-Divisioona	14	4	5	9	41	—	—	—	—	—
2000–01	SaiPa U20	U20 SM-liiga	6	5	8	13	16	2	1	0	1	2
2000–01	SaiPa	SM-liiga	50	1	2	3	64	—	—	—	—	—
2001–02	SaiPa U20	U20 SM-liiga	4	3	1	4	18	9	4	4	8	24
2001–02	SaiPa	SM-liiga	45	6	5	11	44	—	—	—	—	—
2002–03	SaiPa	SM-liiga	41	5	5	10	46	—	—	—	—	—
2003–04	SaiPa	SM-liiga	38	7	7	14	84	—	—	—	—	—
2003–04	Lukko	SM-liiga	10	0	1	1	0	4	0	0	0	2
2004–05	Lukko	SM-liiga	56	5	5	10	30	9	0	0	0	2
2005–06	Lukko	SM-liiga	25	2	5	7	28	—	—	—	—	—
2005–06	HC TPS	SM-liiga	13	0	1	1	12	2	0	0	0	4
2005–06	FPS	Mestis	2	0	0	0	4	—	—	—	—	—
2006–07	HC TPS	SM-liiga	50	6	10	16	73	1	0	0	0	0
2007–08	Imatran Ketterä	Suomi-sarja	10	5	10	15	20	—	—	—	—	—
2007–08	SaiPa	SM-liiga	9	1	2	3	6	—	—	—	—	—
2008–09	SaiPa	SM-liiga	33	5	5	10	47	—	—	—	—	—
2009–10	SaiPa	SM-liiga	39	2	4	6	36	—	—	—	—	—
SM-liiga totals			409	40	52	92	470	16	0	0	0	8
