= Saku Vesterinen =

Finnish ice hockey defenceman

- Born: February 28, 1999 (age 26); Siilinjärvi, Finland
- Height: 6 ft 0 in (183 cm)
- Weight: 183 lb (83 kg; 13 st 1 lb)
- Position: Defence
- Shoots: Right
- Liiga team (P) Cur. team: KalPa; IPK (Mestis)
- Playing career: 2018–present

Saku Vesterinen (born February 28, 1999) is a Finnish professional ice hockey defenceman currently playing for IPK on loan from KalPa.

Vesterinen played junior hockey with the Charlottetown Islanders of the Quebec Major Junior Hockey League for two seasons between 2016 and 2018. He made his Liiga debut for KalPa on September 21, 2018, against JYP.
