= Imatrankoski =

Rapid in Imatra, Finland

Coordinates: 61°10′10.2″N 028°46′25.1″E

Imatrankoski rapids

Imatrankoski (The Imatra Rapids) are rapids on the Vuoksi in Imatra, Finland. It has been a famous tourist attraction since the late 1700s. Imatrankoski is also one of the National landscapes of Finland. Since 1929, the rapids have been blocked by a dam as the Imatra hydroelectric plant began operation. Today, the dam is opened daily between June and August (Wednesday to Sunday, at 18:00) as well as on Christmas Day and New Year's Eve.

== Geological history ==
The Vuoksi and Imatrankoski were born about 5,000 BP as the waters of the Saimaa Lake penetrated the Salpausselkä end moraine due to post-glacial rebound, forming a river flowing first into the Gulf of Finland and then to Lake Ladoga.

== Tourism ==
Tourism in Imatrankoski is considered begun in 1772 as the Empress of Russia Catherine the Great visited the site. The Kruununpuisto Park, the oldest nature park in Finland, was established in 1842 by the Emperor Nicholas I. Emperor Pedro II of Brazil visited the rapids in 1876. At the end of the 19th century, Imatrankoski was one of the best known nature attractions in Europe. The hotel Valtionhotelli was finally opened in 1903.

== Gallery ==
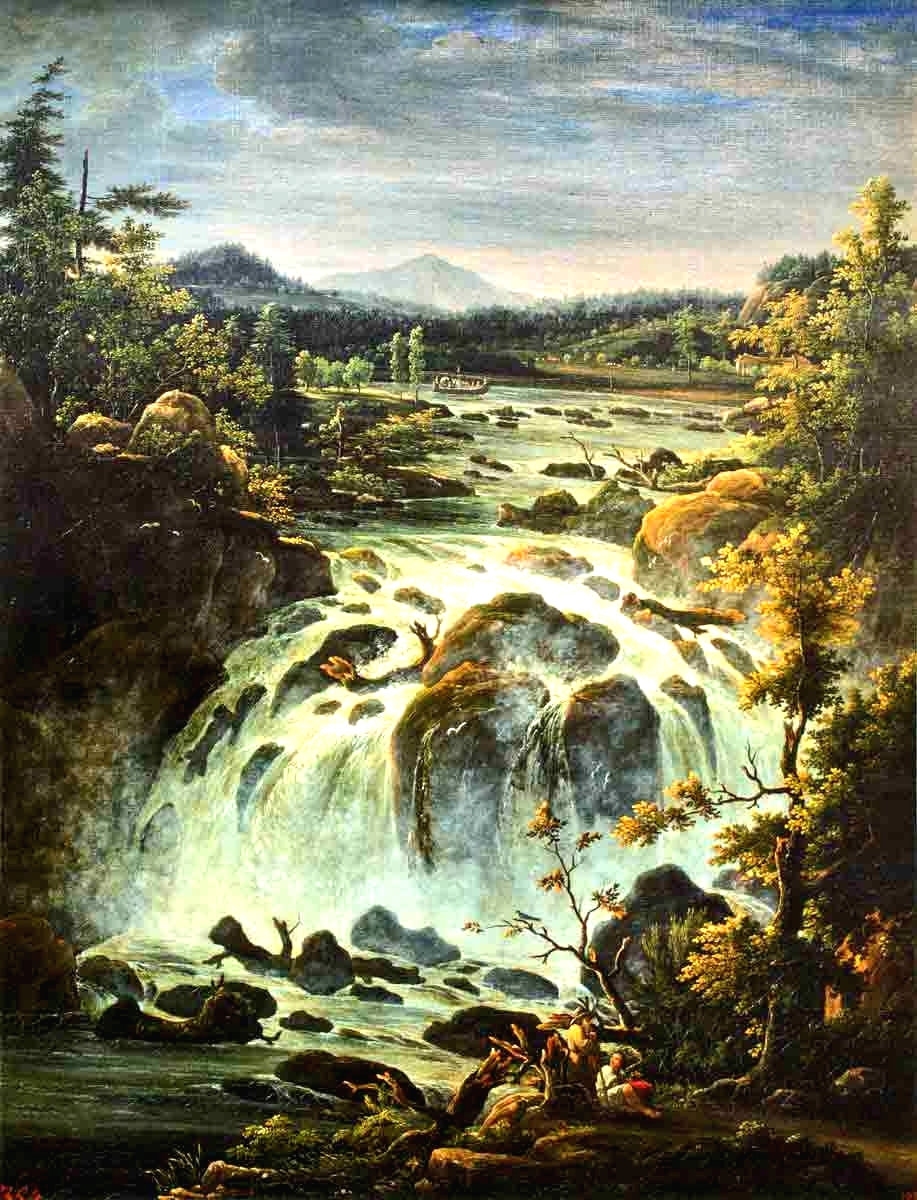
Imatrankoski by Fedor Matveev in 1819.

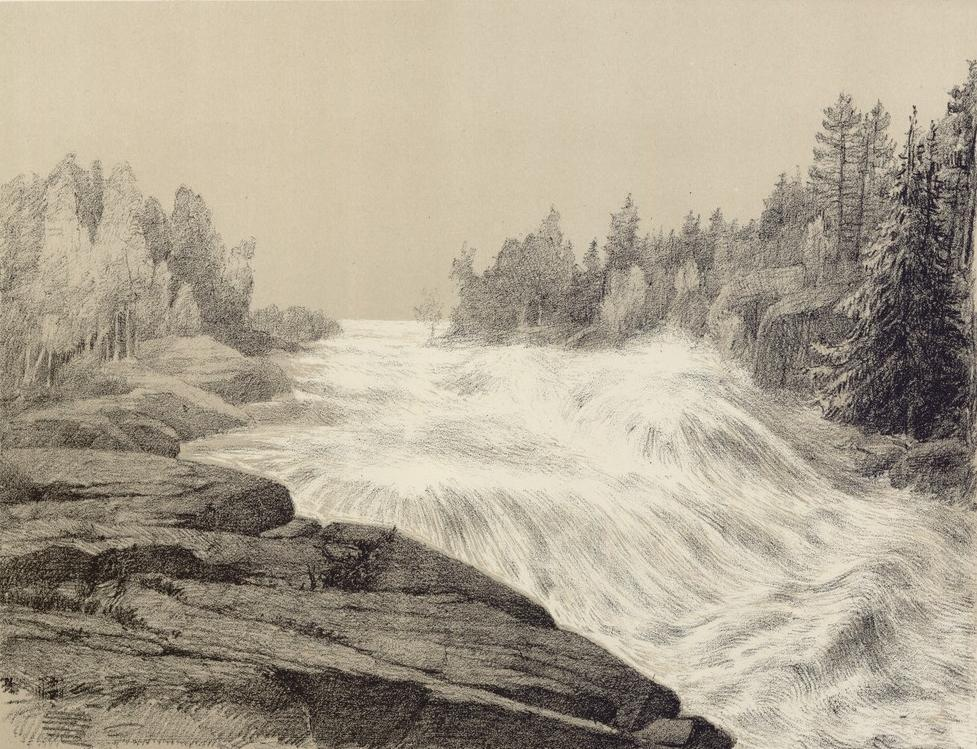
A 19th century sketch of the Imatrankoski rapid

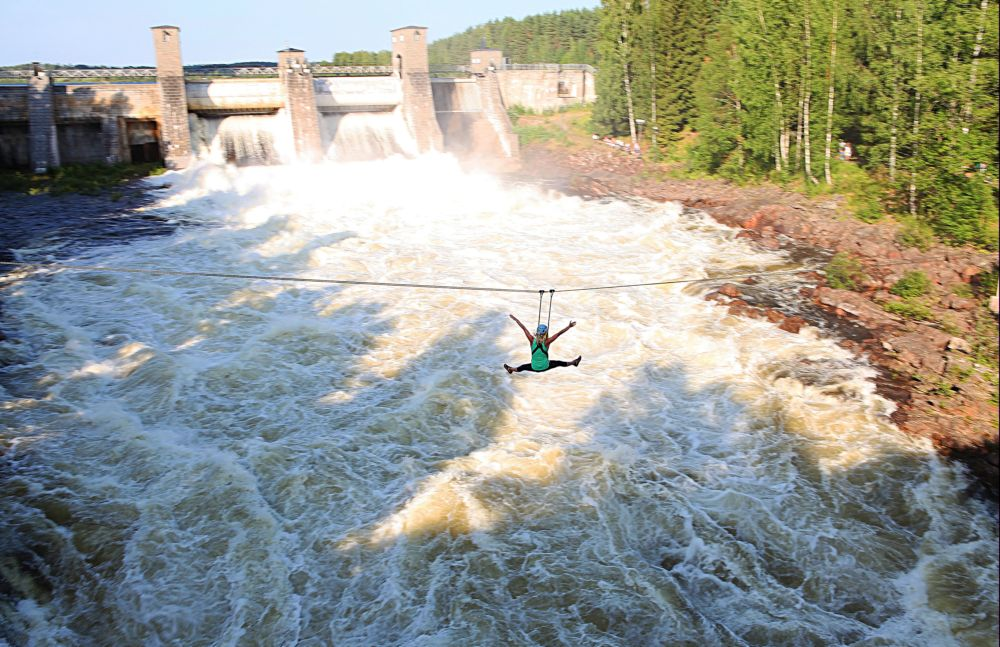
The dam

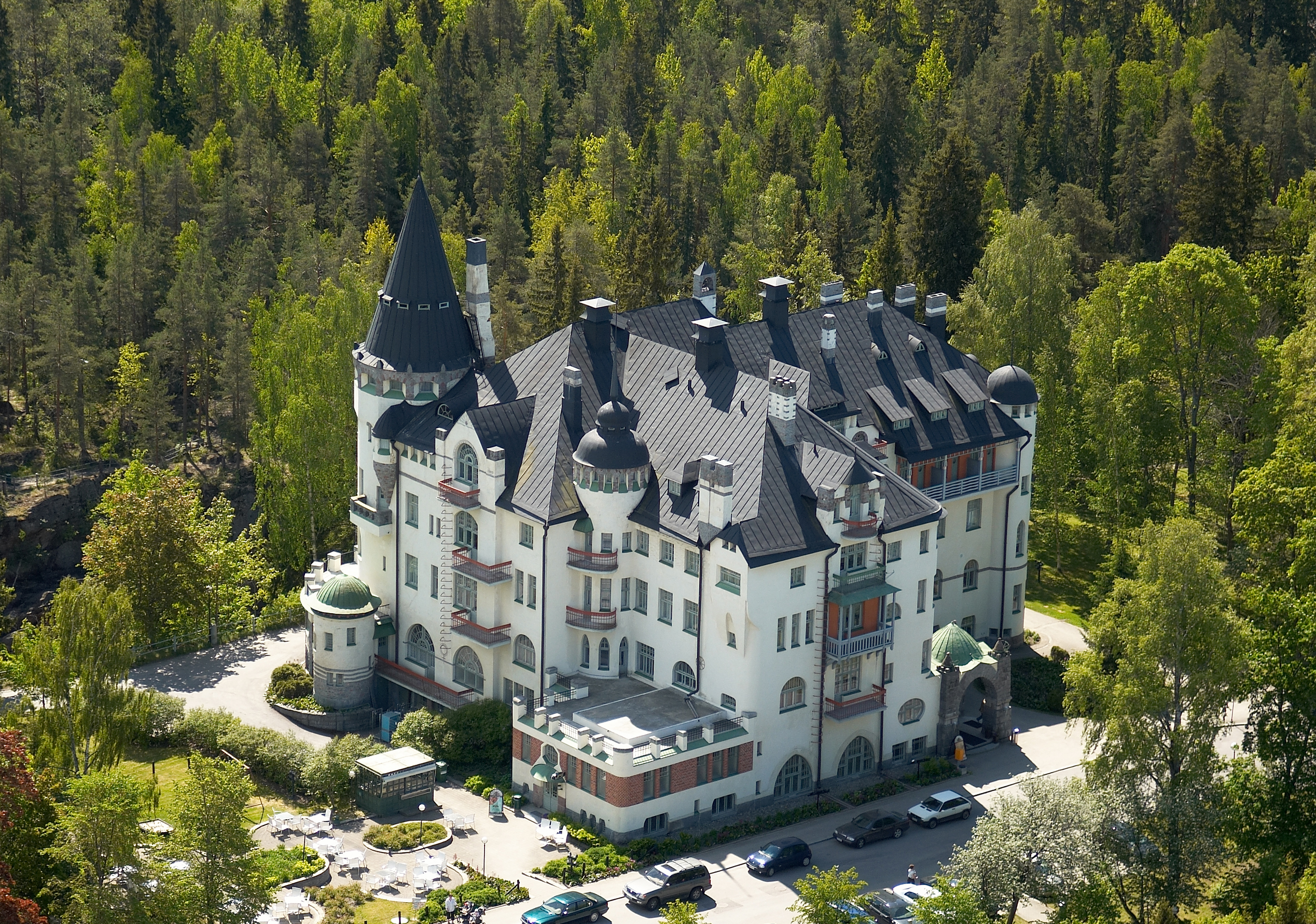
Hotel Valtionhotelli at the Kruununpuisto Park

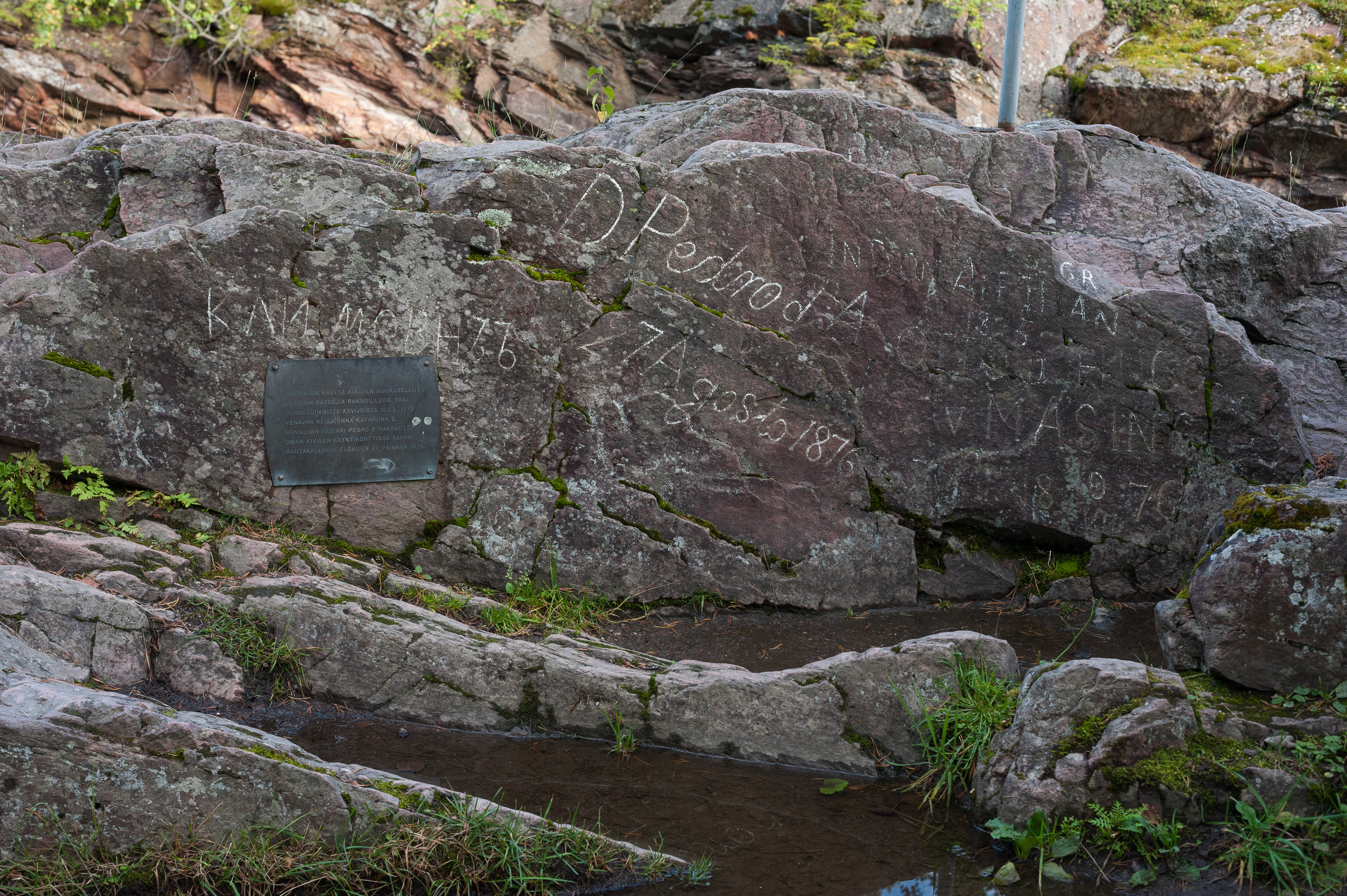
Engraved signature by Emperor Pedro II of Brazil while visiting Imatrankoski in 1876.

== See also ==
- Valtionhotelli
- Imatra
- Saimaa
- Lappeenranta
