= Samu Pyykkönen =

Finnish ice hockey player

- Born: 4 September 1994 (age 30); Suomussalmi, Finland
- Height: 6 ft 1 in (185 cm)
- Weight: 190 lb (86 kg; 13 st 8 lb)
- Position: Centre
- Shoots: Left
- Mestis team Former teams: Hokki; IPK
- Playing career: 2013–present

Samu Pyykkönen (born 4 September 1994) is a Finnish professional ice hockey centre currently playing for Hokki in Mestis.

Pyykkönen made his professional debut for Hokki during the 2012–13 Mestis season, playing eight games and scoring one goal. He then became a regular member of the team until 2017 when he joined fellow Mestis team IPK. After two seasons with IPK, Pyykkönen returned to Hokki on 21 May 2019.
