= Juuso Nevalainen =

Finnish ice hockey right winger

- Born: May 2, 1997 (age 28) Forssa, Finland
- Height: 5 ft 11 in (180 cm)
- Weight: 190 lb (86 kg; 13 st 8 lb)
- Position: Right wing
- Shoots: Left
- Mestis team Former teams: IPK; KalPa
- Playing career: 2017–present

Juuso Nevalainen (born May 2, 1997) is a Finnish professional ice hockey right winger currently playing for IPK in Mestis.

Nevalainen previously played six games for KalPa during the 2016–17 Liiga season and scored no points. He then had a loan spell with IPK in the 2017–18 season before joining them on a permanent basis on May 17, 2019.
