= Ville Järvinen =

Finnish ice hockey player

- Born: January 3, 1997 (age 28); Tampere, Finland
- Height: 6 ft 4 in (193 cm)
- Weight: 209 lb (95 kg; 14 st 13 lb)
- Position: Defence
- Shoots: Left
- Mestis team Former teams: IPK; Ilves; KooKoo
- NHL draft: Undrafted
- Playing career: 2015–present

Ville Järvinen (born January 1, 1997) is a Finnish professional ice hockey defenceman. He is currently playing for IPK of the Finnish Mestis.

Järvinen made his Liiga debut playing with Ilves during the 2015–16 Liiga season. In 2017 he signed for fellow Liiga side KooKoo.
