= Kokkala =

Kokkala may refer to:

- Kokkala, builder of the Vidyanath temple in Khajurao
- Kokalla II (r. c. 990-1015 CE), Indian king from the Kalachuri dynasty of Tripuri
- Kokkalai, a town in Kerala, India
- Kokkala, Kavala, a ruined town in Kavala regional unit, Greece, at 41°03′N 24°25′E
- Kokkala, Laconia, a village in the municipality East Mani, Laconia, Greece

== See also ==
- Kokkola (disambiguation)
