= Niki Koskinen =

Finnish ice hockey left winger

- Born: October 2, 1997 (age 28) Iitti, Finland
- Height: 6 ft 0 in (183 cm)
- Weight: 196 lb (89 kg; 14 st 0 lb)
- Position: Left wing
- Shoots: Left
- Mestis team Former teams: Iisalmen Peli-Karhut; KooKoo
- Playing career: 2018–present

Niki Koskinen (born October 2, 1997) is a Finnish professional ice hockey player currently playing for IPK in Mestis.

Koskinen played seven games for KooKoo during the 2017–18 Liiga season and scored no points. He then has loan spells with SaPKo and IPK during the 2018–19 season before joining IPK on a permanent basis on May 3, 2019.
