= Joensuu Arena =

Indoor arena in Joensuu, Finland

Coordinates: 62°36′00″N 29°44′24″E

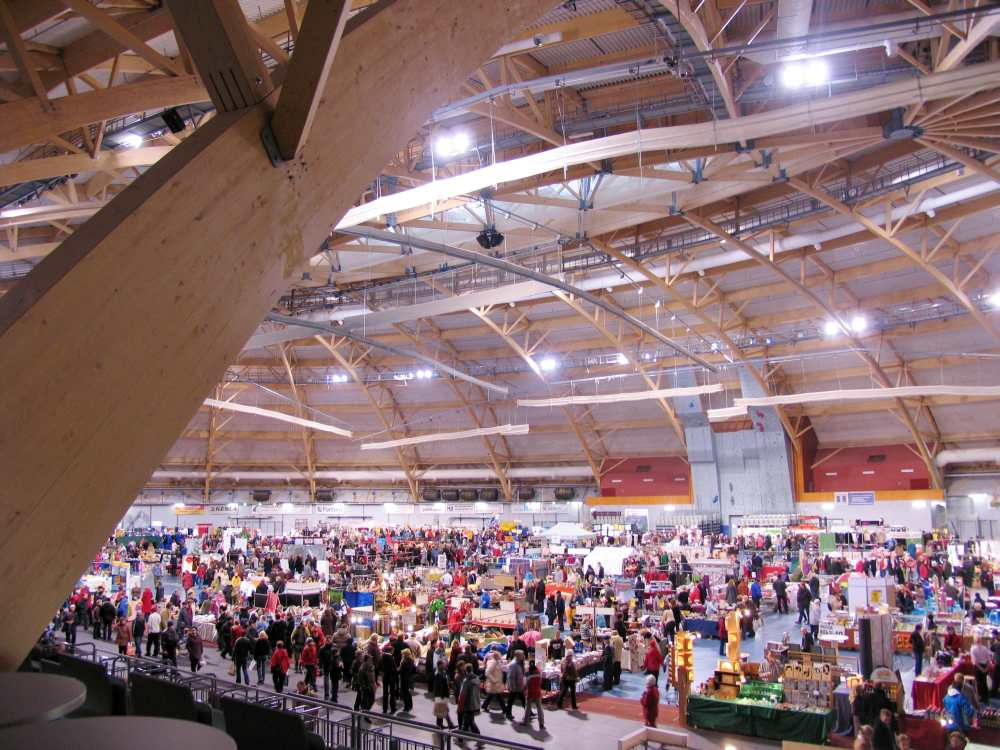
Interior of the Joensuu Arena

The Joensuu Arena is a large multi-purpose hall and a center for large events in Joensuu, Finland, built primarily for the use of athletes. It is the largest building in the Mehtimäki's sports area, right near the center of Joensuu. The arena's equipment level, acoustics and lighting power are also suitable for organizing large meetings, trade fairs, events and concerts. The arena was completed in February 2004. When completed, it was the largest wooden building in Finland. Paavo Lipponen, the Speaker of Parliament at the time, officially inaugurated it on March 17, 2004.

The arena is a venue for major trade fairs and events. Among other things, various fairs have been held there, the largest of which is the Karelian Fair 2004, and large public events, such as the Gospel Festival 2006 and the Party of Finland Party Conference 2008. The SDP, the National Coalition Party and the Finns Party have also held their party meetings in the Arena.

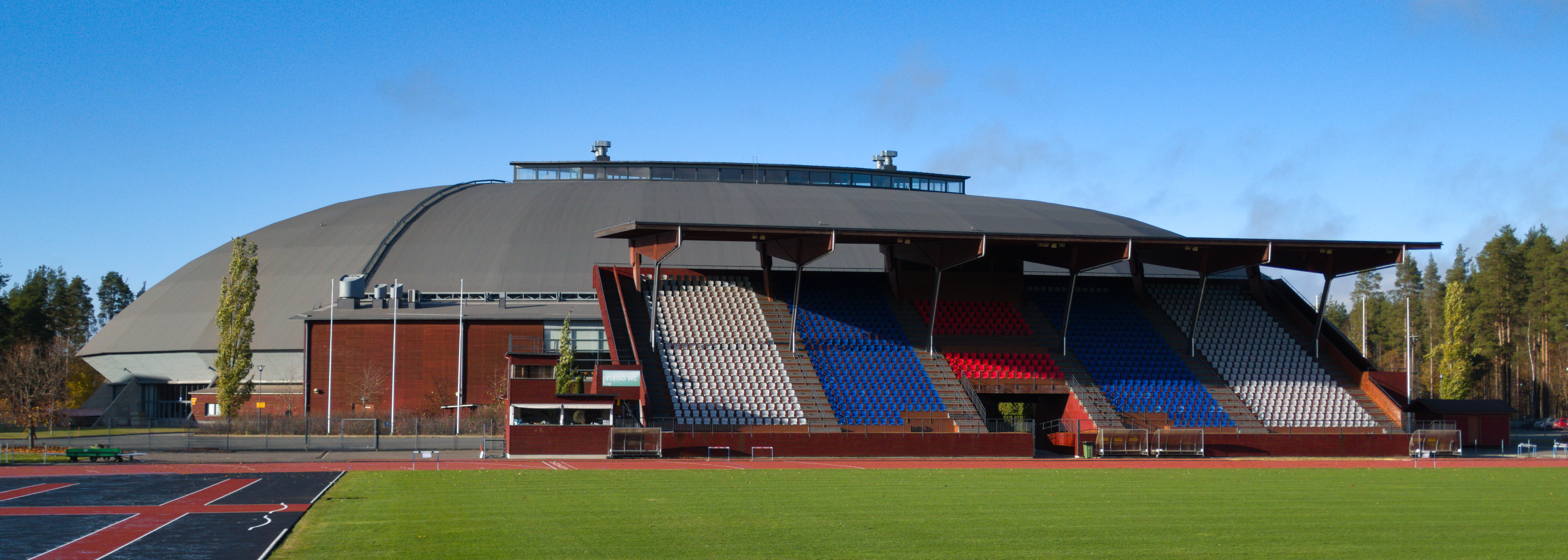
The exterior of the arena, in 2020

The arena is the home hall of Josba (floorball) in Joensuu. Joensuun Maila (baseball) plays the games of the winter series. The Joensuu Thai Boxing Club also trains at the Joensuu Arena. The biggest event in the arena so far was the Taitaja event, which brought tens of thousands of spectators to Joensuu in February-March 2007. In May 2007, Deep Purple performed in the arena, when the audience was 6,000 people at the same time.

== See also ==
- Mehtimäki Ice Hall
