= Jere-Matias Alanen =

Finnish ice hockey winger

- Born: April 27, 1996 (age 29) Tampere, Finland
- Height: 6 ft 6 in (198 cm)
- Weight: 196 lb (89 kg; 14 st 0 lb)
- Position: Winger
- Shoots: Left
- team Former teams: IPK; Tappara
- Playing career: 2017–present

Jere-Matias Alanen (born April 27, 1996) is a Finnish professional ice hockey winger. He is currently playing for RoKi of the Mestis.

Alanen made his Liiga debut for Tappara, playing three games during the 2016–17 season. He played a further two games for Tappara during the 2017–18 season.

== Career statistics ==
			Regular season					Playoffs
Season	Team	League	GP	G	A	Pts	PIM	GP	G	A	Pts	PIM
2014–15	Tappara	Jr. A	38	3	3	6	18	-	-	-	-	-
2015–16	Tappara	Jr. A	50	11	5	16	18	3	0	0	0	4
2016–17	Tappara	Jr. A	48	15	21	36	32	2	0	1	1	0
2016–17	Tappara	Liiga	3	0	0	0	0	-	-	-	-	-
2017–18	Tappara	Liiga	2	0	0	0	0	-	-	-	-	-
2017–18	LeKi	Mestis	35	16	15	31	67	5	0	1	1	2
2018–19	IPK	Mestis	46	12	7	19	58	-	-	-	-	-
2019–20	IPK	Mestis	37	13	20	33	54	9	4	5	9	4
2020–21	Ketterä	Mestis	28	23	14	337	46
2021–22	JYP	Liiga	40	2	2	4	14
2022–23	RoKi	Mestis
Liiga totals			0	0	0	0	0	-	-	-	-	-
