= List of indoor arenas in Finland =

The following is a list of indoor arenas in Finland with a capacity of at least 1,000 spectators, most of the arenas in this list are for multi use proposes and are used for popular sports such as individual sports like karate, judo, boxing as well as team sports like ice hockey, curling, volleyball. Parts of the arenas also host many concerts and world tours.

== Currently in use ==
Location	Arena	Date built	Capacity	Image
Espoo	Espoo Metro Areena	1999	8,582	
Kauhajoki	IKH Areena	2022	3,500	
Hämeenlinna	Ritari Areena	1979	5,360	
Heinola	Versowood Arena	1984	2,975	
Helsinki	Helsinki Ice Hall	1966	8,200	
Helsinki	Töölö Sports Hall	1935	1,600	
Helsinki	Veikkaus Arena	1997	13,349	
Joensuu	Joensuu Areena	2004	2,000	
Joensuu	Motonet Areena	2022	2,500	
Joensuu	Mehtimäki Ice Hall	1982	4,800	
Jyväskylä	Synergia Areena	1982	4,628	
Kajaani	Kajaanin Jäähalli	1989	1,310	
Kerava	Keravan Jäähalli	1987	1,500	
Kokkola	Kokkolan Jäähalli	1988	5,500	
Kouvola	Lumon Arena	1982	6,200	
Kouvola	MLL-areena	1973	1,076	
Kuopio	Kuopio Ice Hall	1979	5,064	
Lahti	Isku Areena	1973	5,530	
Lappeenranta	Kisapuisto	1972	4,847	
Mikkeli	Ikioma Areena	1982	4,487	
Oulu	Oulun Energia Areena	1975	6,614	
Pori	Isomäki Ice Hall	1971	6,150	
Rovaniemi	Lappi Areena	2003	5,500	
Rauma	Kivikylän Areena	1970	5,400	
Savonlinna	Talvisalo ice rink	1979	2,833	
Tampere	Tampere Ice Stadium	1965	7,300	
Tampere	Nokia Arena	2021	12,700	
Tampere	Tampere Sports Centre	1985	8,000	
Turku	Gatorade Center; Turkuhalli, Åbohallen	1990	11,820	
Turku	Rajupaja Areena; Kupittaan monitoimihalli	2006	3,000	
Uusikaupunki	Pohitullin Sports Hall	1981	1,627	
Vaasa	Vaasa Arena	1971	5,200	
Vantaa	Energia Areena	2006	3,500	
Vantaa	Kuljetusrinki Areena	1974	2,024	
Nokia	AGCO Power Arena	2024	1,900 (main arena)	

== Under proposition ==
Arena	Capacity	Opening	Location
Garden Helsinki	15,000	TBD	Helsinki
Suvilahti Arena	17,000	TBD	Helsinki
Oulu Arena	10,000	TBD	Oulu
TBA	8,900	TBD	Turku
Arena 3.3	21,000 (concerts); 17,000 (sport events)	2028	Vantaa

== See also ==
- List of football stadiums in Finland
- List of indoor arenas by capacity
- Lists of stadiums
