= Tatu Kokkola =

Finnish ice hockey centre

- Born: August 29, 1997 (age 27); Suonenjoki, Finland
- Height: 5 ft 10 in (178 cm)
- Weight: 196 lb (89 kg; 14 st 0 lb)
- Position: Centre
- Shoots: Left
- Mestis team Former teams: Jokipojat; KalPa
- Playing career: 2017–present

Tatu Kokkola (born August 29, 1997) is a Finnish professional ice hockey player currently playing for Jokipojat in Mestis.

Kokkola previously played in Liiga for KalPa, making his debut during the 2016–17 Liiga season where he played two games. He then played two more games for KalPa the following season before joining IPK of Mestis on loan. On May 4, 2018, Kokkola signed for Jokipojat.
