= Santeri Immonen =

Finnish ice hockey player and coach

- Born: 29 July 1972 (age 53) Helsinki, Finland
- Height: 174 cm (5 ft 9 in)
- Weight: 75 kg (165 lb; 11 st 11 lb)
- Position: Defence
- Shot: Left
- Played for: Jokerit; Ässät; KalPa; Newcastle Jesters; Pingouins de Morzine-Avoriaz; Bisons de Neuilly-sur-Marne
- Current Liiga coach: SaiPa (assistant)
- Coached for: Pingouins de Morzine-Avoriaz; Gothiques d'Amiens (assistant); Forssan Palloseura; Espoo Blues U20 (assistant); Jokerit U20; Rovaniemen Kiekko
- Playing career: 1993–2011
- Coaching career: 2009–present

Santeri Immonen (born 29 July 1972) is a Finnish former professional ice hockey defenceman and current assistant coach of SaiPa of the Liiga.

== Playing career ==
Immonen played in the SM-liiga for Jokerit, Ässät and KalPa, playing 237 regular seasons in total between 1994 and 2000. He also played in the British Ice Hockey Superleague for the Newcastle Jesters, the Swedish HockeyAllsvenskan for IK Nyköpings and the French Ligue Magnus for the Pingouins de Morzine-Avoriaz and the Bisons de Neuilly-sur-Marne.

== Coaching career ==
His coaching career began while he was still an active player – he served as player-coach in his final two seasons with Morzine-Avoriaz, 2009–10 and 2010–11, before ending his playing career and remaining the team's head coach through the 2011–12 season. From Morzine-Avoriaz, he moved on to the Gothiques d'Amiens, serving as assistant coach through the 2013–14 season.

Immonen returned to his native Finland in 2014, taking over as head coach for Forssan Palloseura (FPS) of the third-tier Suomi-sarja. In 2016, he accepted an assistant coaching position with the Espoo Blues' under-20 junior team of the U20 SM-sarja and, in 2017, he became head coach of Jokerit's under-20 team, also of the U20 SM-sarja.

In 2018, Immonen was appointed head coach of the Mestis team Rovaniemen Kiekko (RoKi).
