= Antti Virtanen =

Finnish ice hockey player

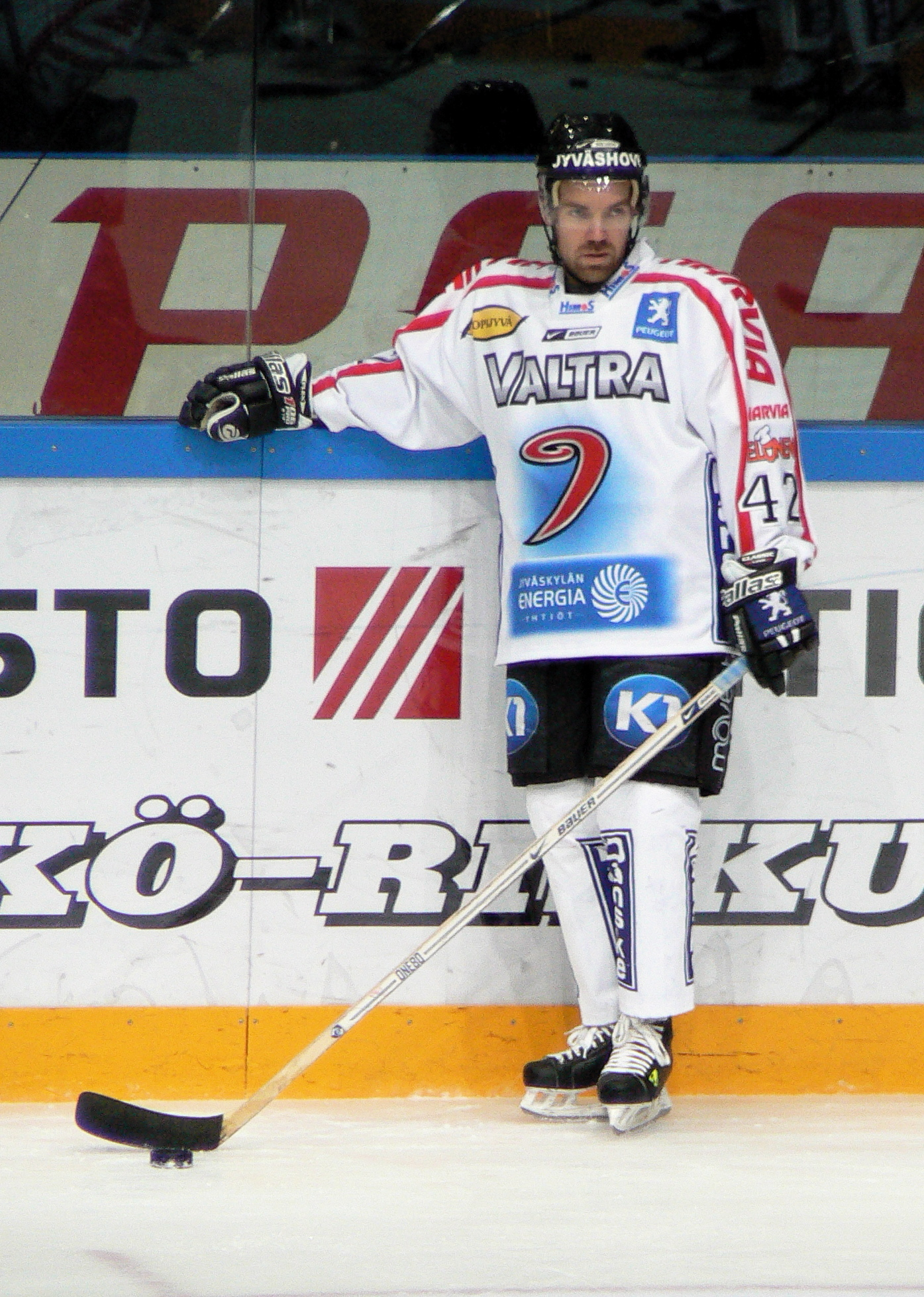
- Born: 3 May 1977 (age 47); Turku, Finland
- Height: 5 ft 9 in (175 cm)
- Weight: 157 lb (71 kg; 11 st 3 lb)
- Position: Forward
- Shot: Right
- Played for: HPK; JYP; Skellefteå AIK
- NHL draft: Undrafted
- Playing career: 1996–2014

Antti Virtanen (born 3 May 1977) is a Finnish former professional ice hockey player who played in the SM-liiga and Swedish Hockey League (SHL).

== Career statistics ==
			Regular season					Playoffs
Season	Team	League	GP	G	A	Pts	PIM	GP	G	A	Pts	PIM
1992–93	TUTO Hockey U16	U16 SM-sarja	12	14	11	25	12	—	—	—	—	—
1994–95	TUTO Hockey U20	U20 I-Divisioona	17	8	13	21	4	—	—	—	—	—
1995–96	TUTO Hockey U20	U20 I-Divisioona	14	9	14	23	4	—	—	—	—	—
1996–97	TUTO Hockey U20	U20 I-Divisioona	10	9	10	19	17	—	—	—	—	—
1996–97	TUTO Hockey	I-Divisioona	39	35	21	56	18	—	—	—	—	—
1997–98	Kokkolan Hermes	I-Divisioona	49	29	45	74	22	8	6	5	11	0
1998–99	Kokkolan Hermes	I-Divisioona	32	20	19	39	10	3	0	0	0	4
1998–99	HPK	SM-liiga	16	1	2	3	6	—	—	—	—	—
1999–00	HPK	SM-liiga	5	0	0	0	0	—	—	—	—	—
1999–00	Vaasan Sport	I-Divisioona	45	25	29	54	6	4	0	1	1	0
2000–01	JYP Jyväskylä	SM-liiga	56	12	12	24	14	—	—	—	—	—
2001–02	JYP Jyväskylä	SM-liiga	54	15	17	32	10	—	—	—	—	—
2002–03	JYP Jyväskylä	SM-liiga	56	16	16	32	28	6	1	0	1	29
2003–04	JYP Jyväskylä	SM-liiga	56	18	29	47	6	2	2	1	3	0
2004–05	JYP Jyväskylä	SM-liiga	55	14	26	40	22	3	0	1	1	0
2005–06	JYP Jyväskylä	SM-liiga	55	14	16	30	51	2	1	1	2	0
2006–07	Skellefteå AIK	Elitserien	9	0	3	3	2	—	—	—	—	—
2006–07	Black Wings Linz	EBEL	26	11	18	29	8	—	—	—	—	—
2007–08	JYP Jyväskylä	SM-liiga	53	13	29	42	16	6	0	3	3	0
2008–09	JYP Jyväskylä	SM-liiga	56	22	31	53	34	15	6	5	11	6
2009–10	JYP Jyväskylä	SM-liiga	55	6	16	22	14	9	1	5	6	0
2010–11	JYP Jyväskylä	SM-liiga	52	7	12	19	10	9	3	2	5	4
2011–12	TUTO Hockey	Mestis	39	15	27	42	14	4	2	1	3	2
2012–13	TUTO Hockey	Mestis	46	15	30	45	36	11	5	7	12	2
2013–14	TUTO Hockey	Mestis	54	15	32	47	16	13	2	13	15	0
SM-liiga totals			569	138	206	344	211	52	14	18	32	39
