= Mehtimäki Ice Hall =

Ice hall in Joensuu, Finland

PKS Areena
- Ärjyluola
- Interactive map of PKS Areena
- Location: Kuntopolku 6
- Coordinates: 62°36′00″N 29°44′28″E
- Owner: City of Joensuu
- Capacity: 4.800 (2500 seated), 4 luxury boxes

Construction
- Opened: 1982
- Architect: Georgios Fasoulas

Tenant
- Joensuun Kiekko-Pojat (1982-present)

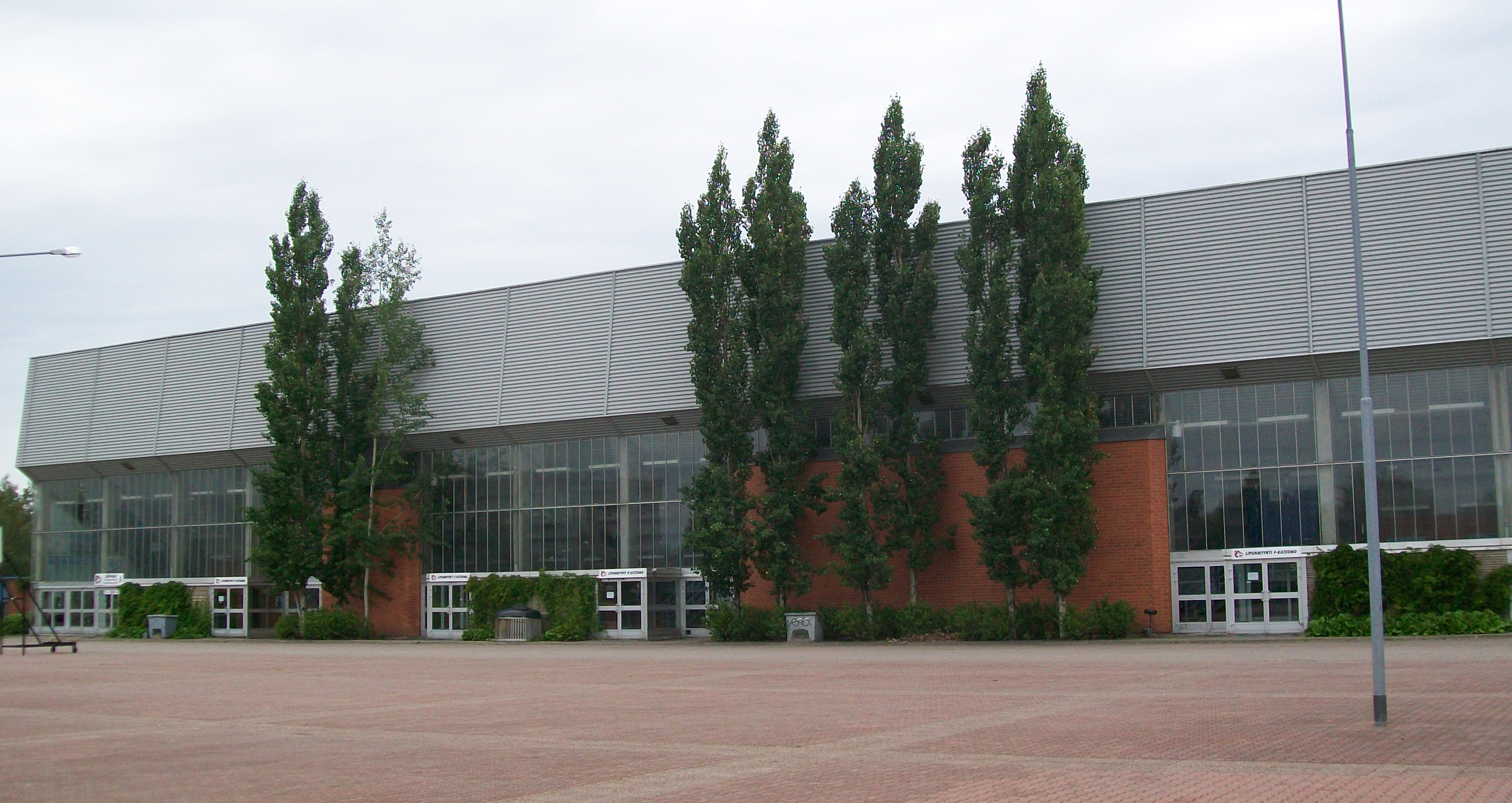
Outdoor view of the arena, taken in 2009

PKS Areena is an indoor arena located in Joensuu, Finland. It is the home arena for Joensuun Kiekko-Pojat of the Mestis and Joensuun Kataja's synchronized skaters. The arena was closed in August 2023 for renovations. The renovations were finished in November 2024.

== See also ==
- Joensuu Arena
