= Imatran Ketterä =

- City: Imatra
- League: Mestis
- Founded: 1957
- Home arena: Imatra Spa Areena (capacity: 1200)
- Colours
- CEO: Carlo Grünn
- General manager: Turkka Partanen
- Head coach: Tuomo Ropo
- Asst. coaches: Teemu Asikainen; Tero Sainio
- Captain: Elmeri Kaksonen
- Affiliates: SaiPa (Liiga)
- Website: http://www.kettera.net/

Championships
- Mestis champion: 3: 2018–19, 2020–21, 2021–22

Imatran Ketterä is an ice hockey club based in Imatra, Finland. Ketterä plays in the Finnish second-tier league, Mestis, during the 2022–23 season.

Ketterä has played in Mestis since 2017 and has won the championship three times (2019, 2021, 2022). With the 2020 playoffs being cancelled due to COVID-19, Ketterä has been the defending champion of Mestis for four years.

== Honours ==
=== Champions ===
- (gold) Mestis (3): 2018–19, 2020–21, 2021–22
- (gold) Suomi-sarja (2): 2008–09, 2016–17
- (gold) Finnish Cup (3): 2018, 2019, 2021

=== Runners-up ===
- (silver) Mestis (3): 2022–23, 2023–24, 2025–26
- (silver) Suomi-sarja (1): 2015-16

== Notable players ==
- (Finland) Petteri Nokelainen
- (Canada) Keith Gretzky
- (Finland) Petteri Sihvonen
- (Finland) Joni Yli-Torkko
- (Finland) Olli Sipiläinen
- (Mexico) Brian Baxter Arroyo Lopez
- (Canada) Steve Peters
- (Finland) Heikki Mälkiä
- (Finland) Pasi Nurminen
- (Finland) Jussi Markkanen
- (United States) Gary Prior
- (Iceland) Björn Robert Sigurdarson
- (Italy) Michael Messner
