= Imatra =

City in southeastern Finland

- City
- Imatran kaupunki Imatra stad
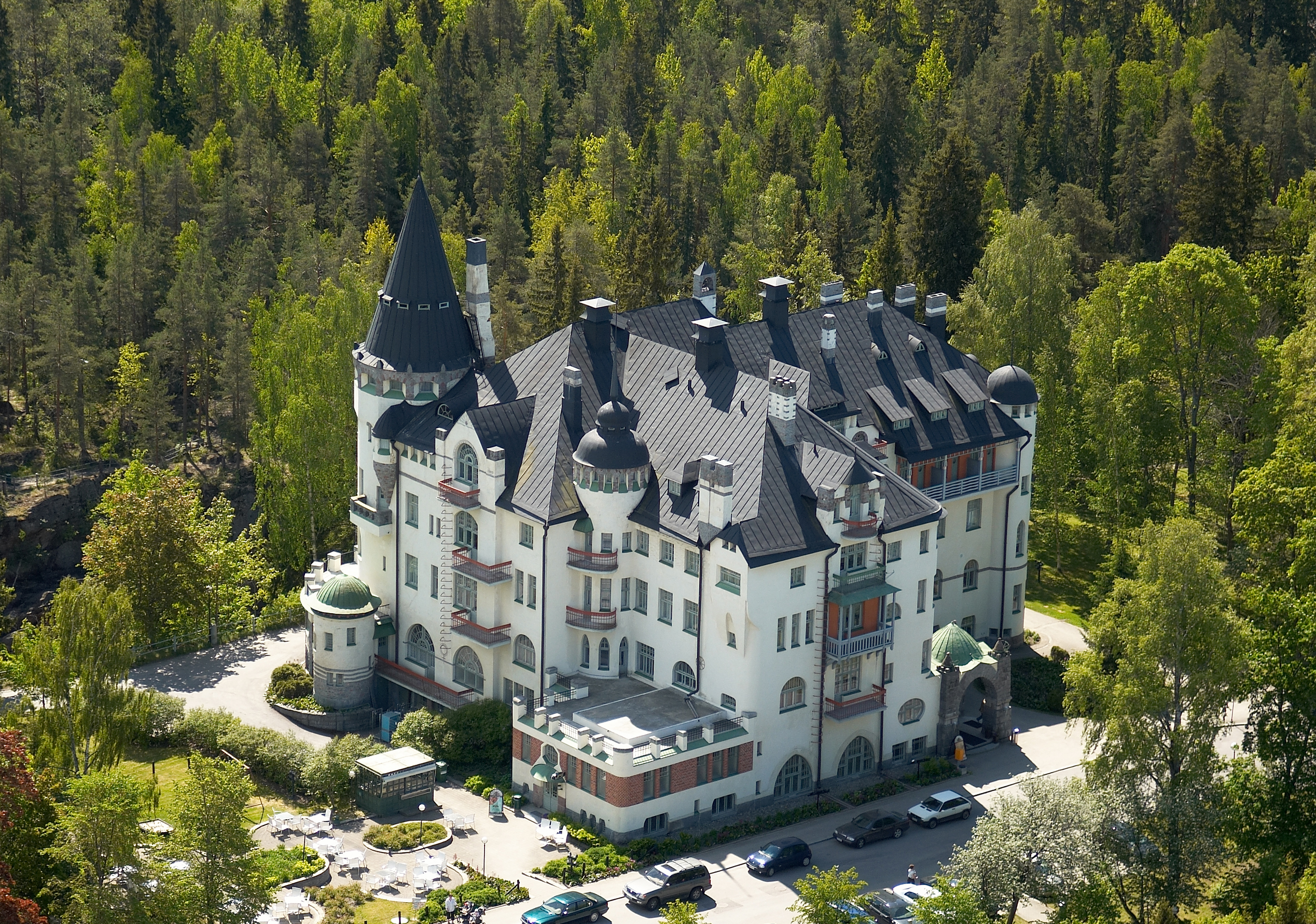
- Imatran Valtionhotelli

- Coat of arms

- Interactive map of Imatra
- Coordinates: 61°11′N 028°46′E
- Country: Finland
- Region: South Karelia
- Sub-region: Imatra
- Charter: 1948

Government
  - City manager: Matias Hildén

Area (2018-01-01)
  - Total: 191.28 km^{2} (73.85 sq mi)
  - Land: 154.99 km^{2} (59.84 sq mi)
  - Water: 36.29 km^{2} (14.01 sq mi)
  - Rank: 274th largest in Finland

Population (2025-12-31)
  - Total: 24,345
  - Rank: 42nd largest in Finland
  - Density: 157.07/km^{2} (406.8/sq mi)

Population by native language
  - Finnish: 89.9% (official)
  - Swedish: 0.1%
  - Others: 10%

Population by age
  - 0 to 14: 12.1%
  - 15 to 64: 56.8%
  - 65 or older: 31.2%
- Time zone: UTC+02:00 (EET)
  - Summer (DST): UTC+03:00 (EEST)
- Climate: Dfc
- Website: www.imatra.fi/en/

Imatra regional connections

Imatra is a city in Finland, located in the southeastern interior of the country. Imatra is located in the region of South Karelia, on Lake Saimaa and the River Vuoksi. The population of Imatra is approximately 24,000, while the sub-region has a population of approximately 36,000. It is the 42nd most populous municipality in Finland.

Imatra lies on the border with Russia. On the other side of the border, seven kilometres (4.3 mi) away from the centre of Imatra, lies the Russian town of Svetogorsk (Finnish: Enso)). The city of St. Petersburg is situated 210 km (130 mi) to the southeast, the Finnish capital Helsinki is 230 km (140 mi) away and Lappeenranta, the nearest Finnish city, is 37 km (23 mi) away.

The main employers are the pulp and paper manufacturer Stora Enso Oyj, the City of Imatra, the engineering steel manufacturer Ovako Bar Oy Ab and the Finnish Border Guard. As of October 2003, the total number of employees was 12,423. As of December 2004, 1,868 people were employed by the City of Imatra. The city's nicknames include Imis, Ibiza and Nahkalippis City (leather baseball cap city). Due to its location close to the border, Russian tourists are a common sight in the city, and Russian tourism is a boon to the local economy. Most people shop in Imatra, and Imatra's tax-free sales are the third largest among Finnish cities (only Helsinki and Lappeenranta are ahead).

The name of Imatra is thought to derive from a pre-Finno-Ugric language. The lightning symbols on Imatra's coat of arms refer to the power plants that were built in the early 1920s at the Tainionkoski and Imatrankoski rapids. The coat of arms was designed by Olof Eriksson and approved by the Imatra Town Council on 9 August 1950. The Ministry of the Interior approved the coat of arms for use on 25 October of the same year.

== History ==
An Art Nouveau or Jugend style castle, currently known as Imatran Valtionhotelli (Imatra State Hotel), was built near the rapids in 1903 as a hotel for tourists from the Russian Imperial capital Saint Petersburg.

During the Continuation War, Carl Gustaf Emil Mannerheim met with Adolf Hitler in secrecy near the town for the former's 75th birthday.

Imatra was founded in 1948 on the territory of three municipalities – Jääski, Ruokolahti and Joutseno. Finland ceded 9% of its territory to the Soviet Union after the Winter War. Jääski lost 85% of its territory and it was decided that a new municipality, Imatra, should be established on the remaining 15% of Jääski and some areas of Ruokolahti and Joutseno. This is why the Imatra coat of arms has three flashes – in honour of those previous municipalities that granted areas to it. It gained its municipal charter in 1971.

== Sport ==
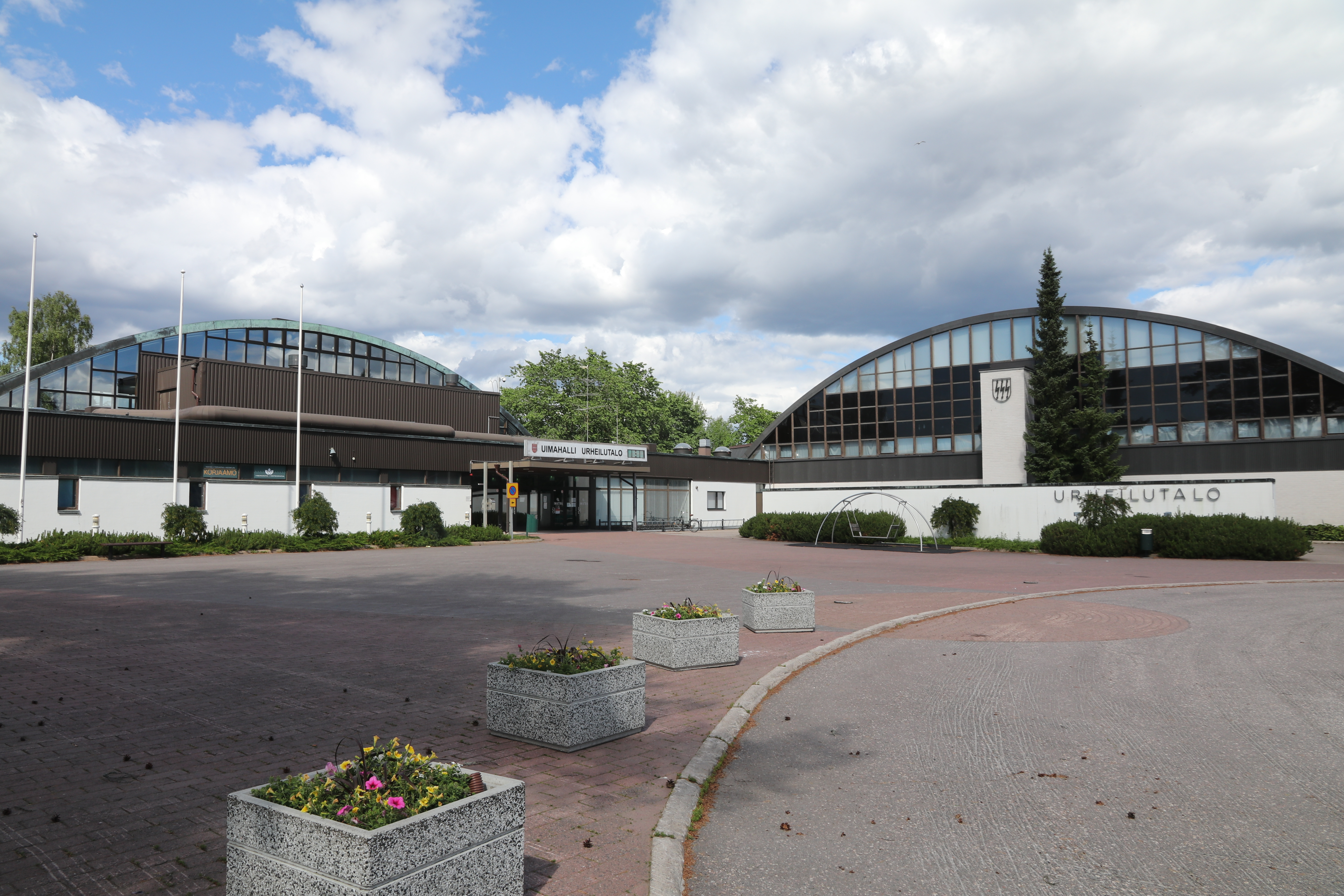
Imatra's swimming hall and sports center

The men's pesäpallo club Imatran Pallo-Veikot competes in the Superpesis national league, playing at Ukonniemi Stadium.

Ice hockey club Imatran Ketterä plays in second-tier Mestis. Imatra is the birthplace of National Hockey League players Jussi Markkanen and Petteri Nokelainen.

In motorsport history, Imatra is best known for its road races (former TT-race) from 1963 to 1986. From 1962 to 1982 it was the home of the Finnish motorcycle Grand Prix. Racing on the Imatra road circuit ended after fatal accident during the 1986 European Championship event. Racing resumed in 2016 as an International Road Racing Championship event.

There is an annual indoor rowing race at Imatra, which attracts competitors from across Finland.

== Culture ==
The Black & White Theatre has produced more than 20 performances, the movie "Murderer" and organized from 2004 Black & White Theatre Festival in Imatra.

== Transport ==
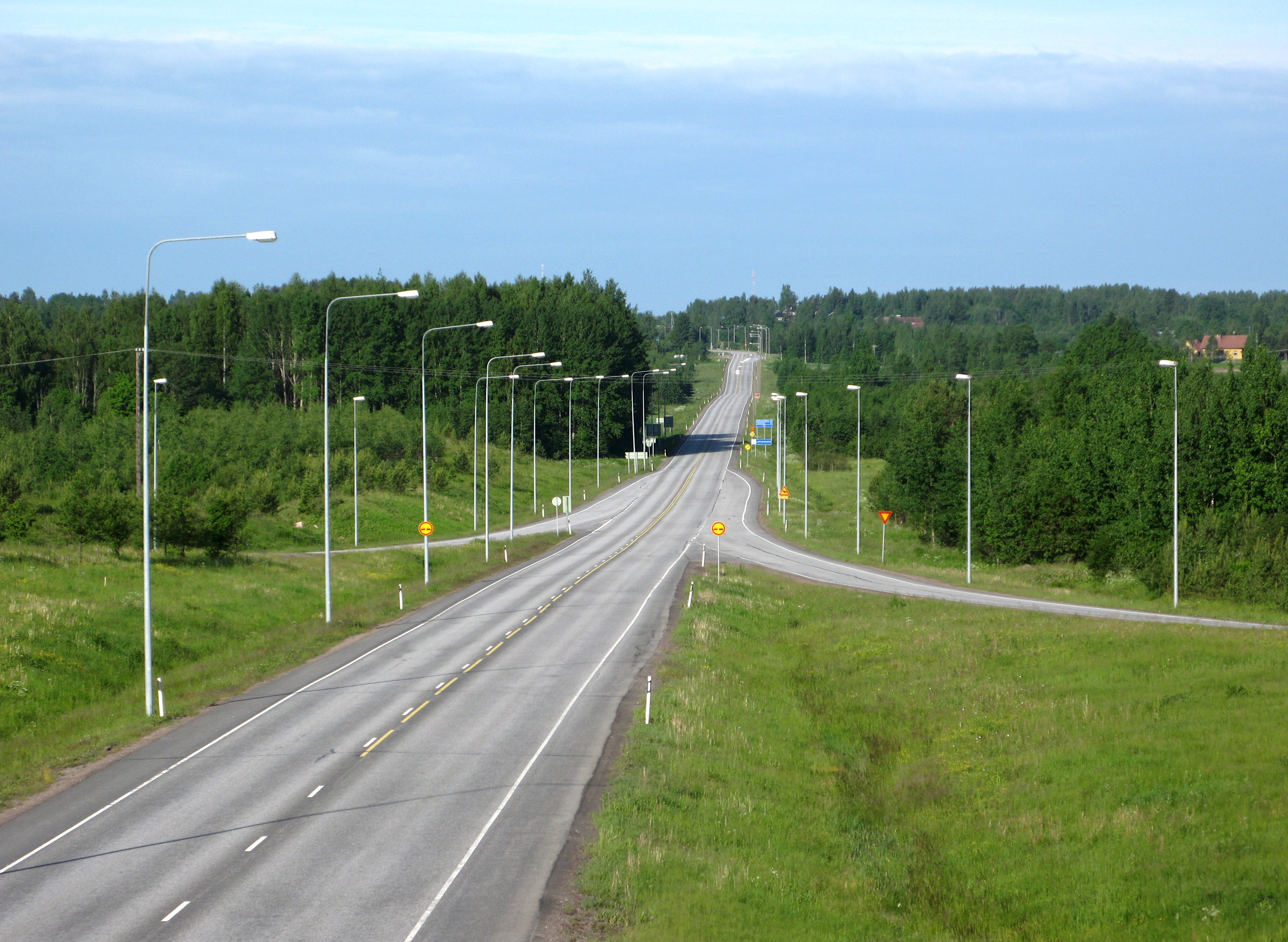
National Road 6

The national road 6, running from Koskenkylä in Loviisa to Kajaani via Kouvola, Lappeenranta, and Joensuu passes through Imatra. Also in Imatra is a crossing point over the Russian border, which is also the ending point of primary road 62 from Mikkeli.

The Kouvola–Joensuu railway passes through Imatra, and the Imatra railway station serves both passenger and freight transport. From the rail yard of this station is a fork onto the railway towards Kamennogorsk via Vyborg. The planning of the initiation of regular international passenger traffic between Imatra and Saint Petersburg has stopped due to Russia's war against Ukraine.

The closest airport to Imatra is the Lappeenranta Airport, which was previously used by Ryanair on several routes. The Immola Airfield is also present, serving the Finnish Border Guard as well as hobbyist aviation activities.

== Demographics ==
Population size 1990–2025
Year	Population
1990	33,566
1995	32,057
2000	30,663
2005	29,529
2010	28,540
2015	27,835
2020	26,075
2025	24,345

== Notable people ==
- Marlo Koponen, ice hockey player
- Jarmo Koski, actor
- Arvo Kyllönen, wrestler
- Jussi Markkanen, ice hockey player
- Petteri Nokelainen, ice hockey player
- Lilli Paasikivi, artistic director
- Jouni Pellinen, skier
- Jarmo Sandelin, professional golfer
- Anneli Taina, politician
- Taiska, singer

== International relations ==
Sister cities:

- Ludvika, Sweden
- Salzgitter, Germany
- Zvolen, Slovakia
- Tikhvin, Russia (frozen since 2022 due to Russia attacking Ukraine)
- Szigetvár, Hungary
- Narva-Jõesuu, Estonia
- Jiaxing, China

Sister cities:

- Beihai, China

Co-operation cities:

- Nizhyn, Ukraine

== Gallery ==
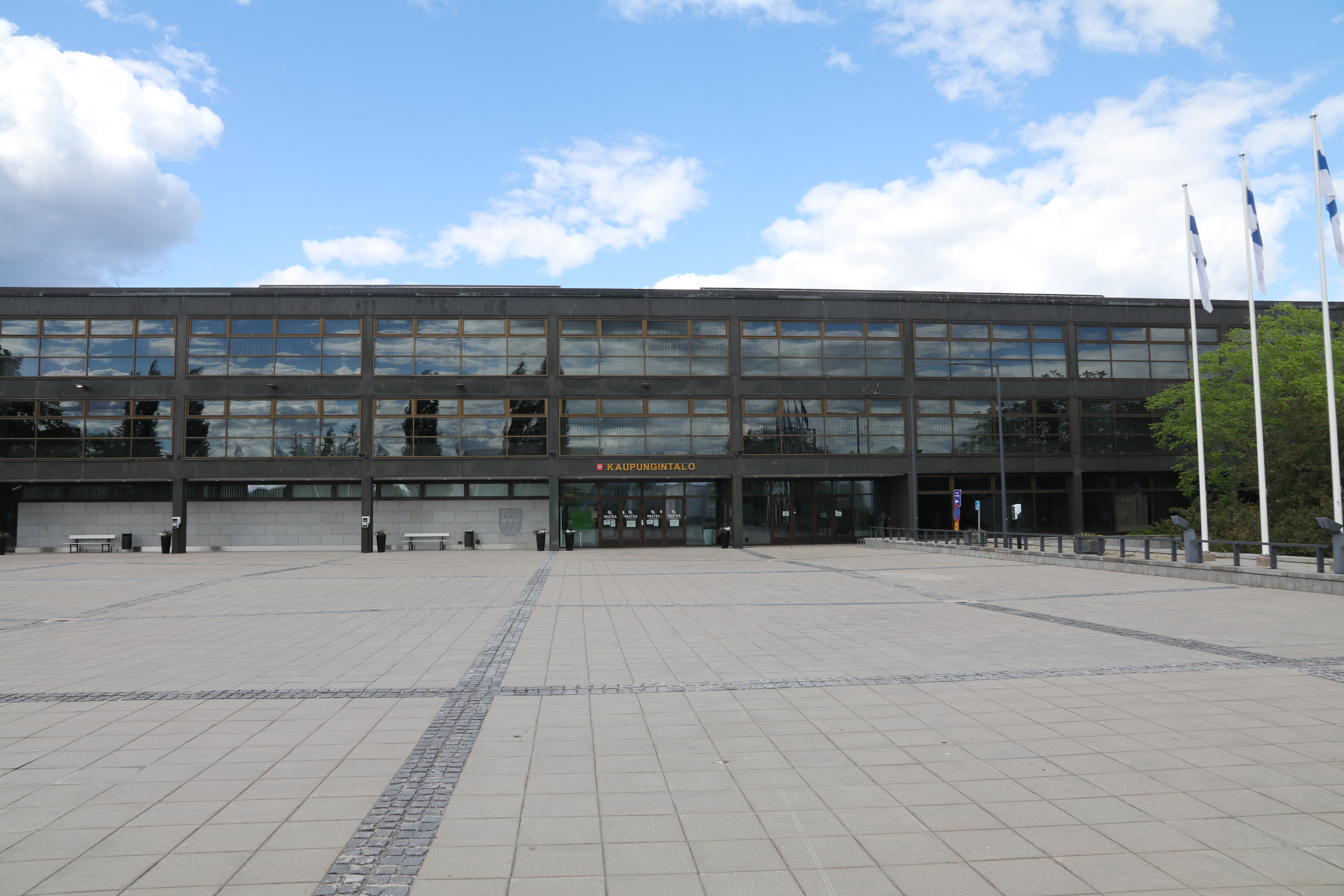
Imatra Town Hall

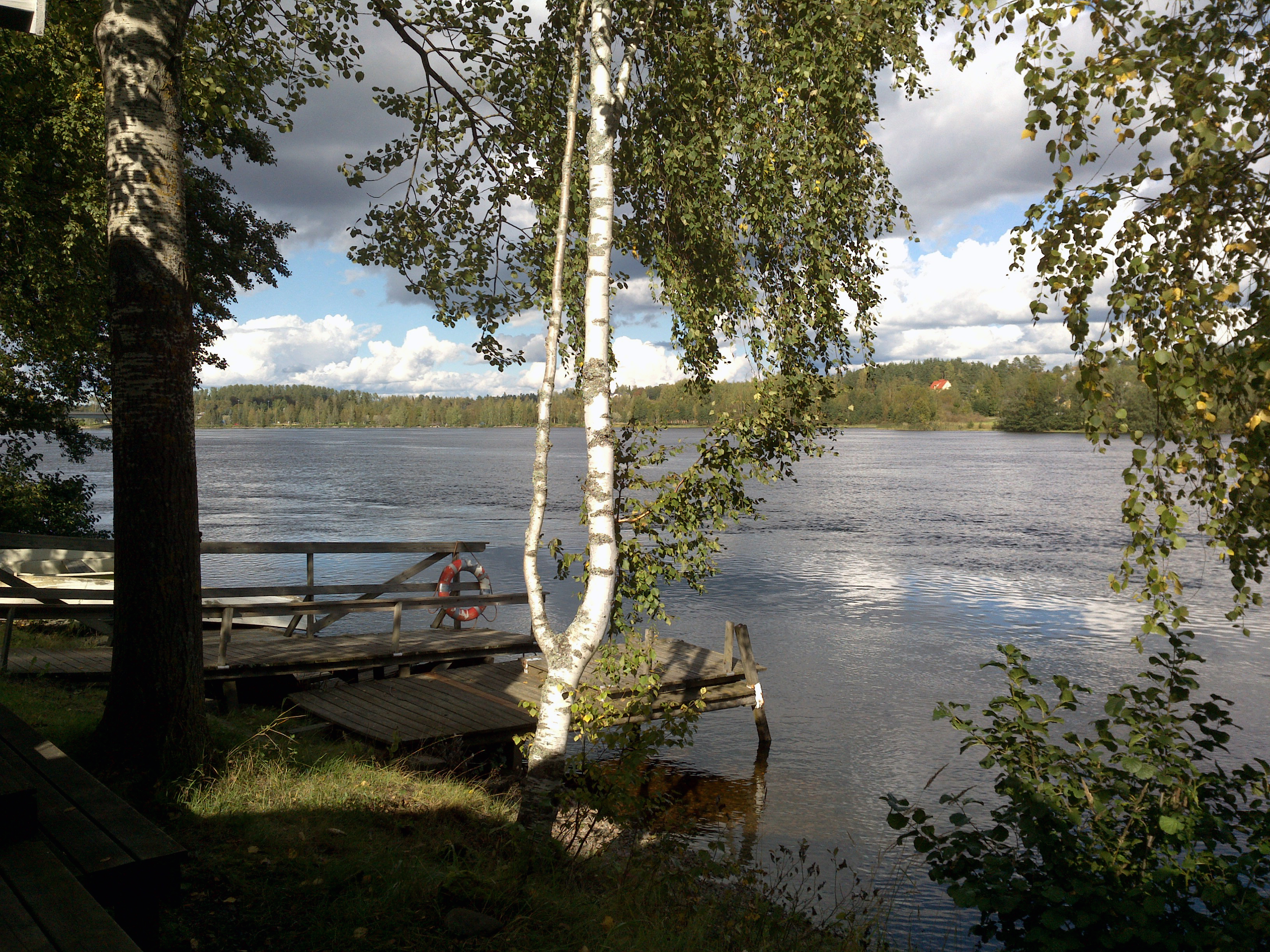
Vuoksi River

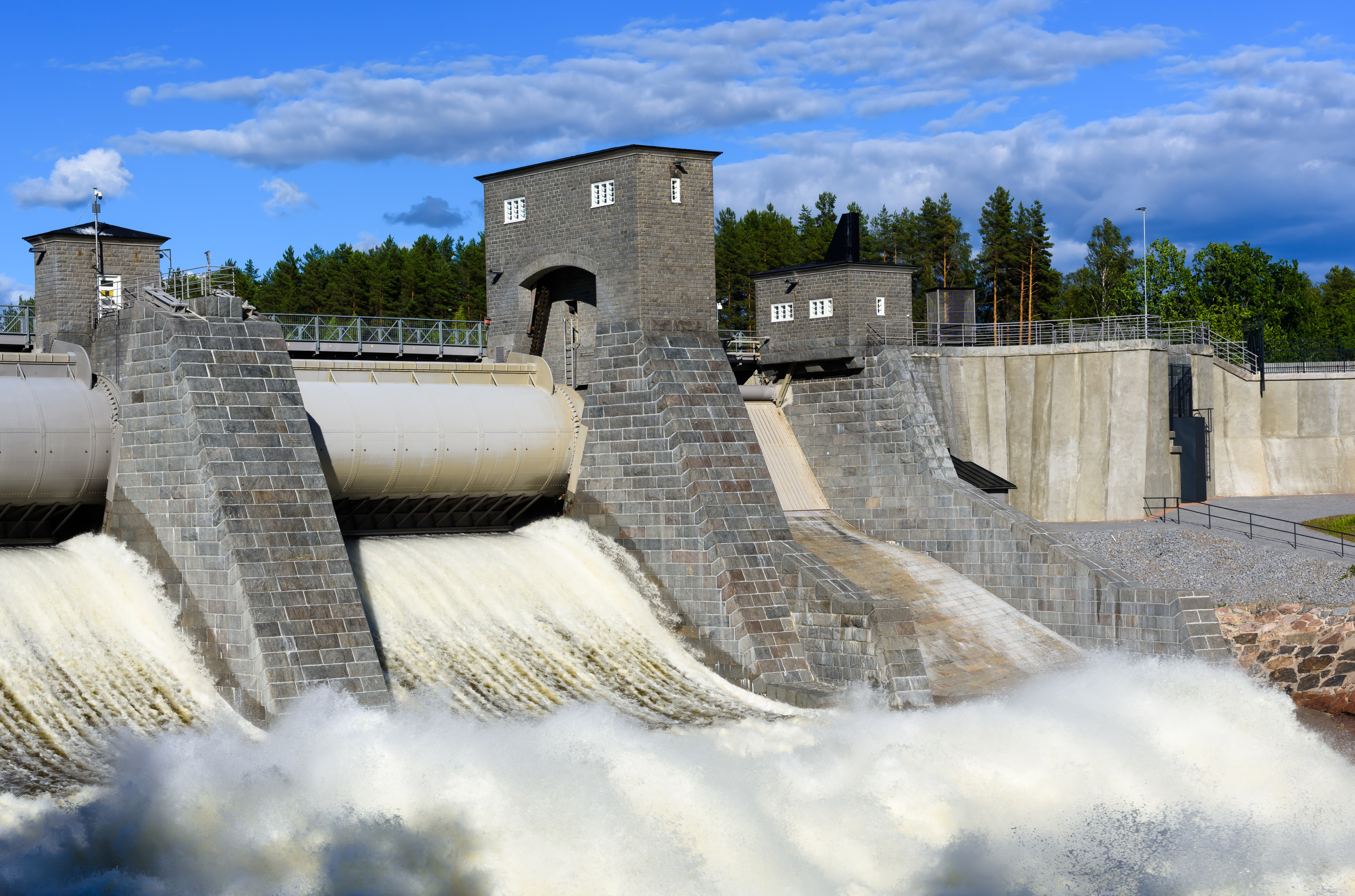
Imatrankoski dam

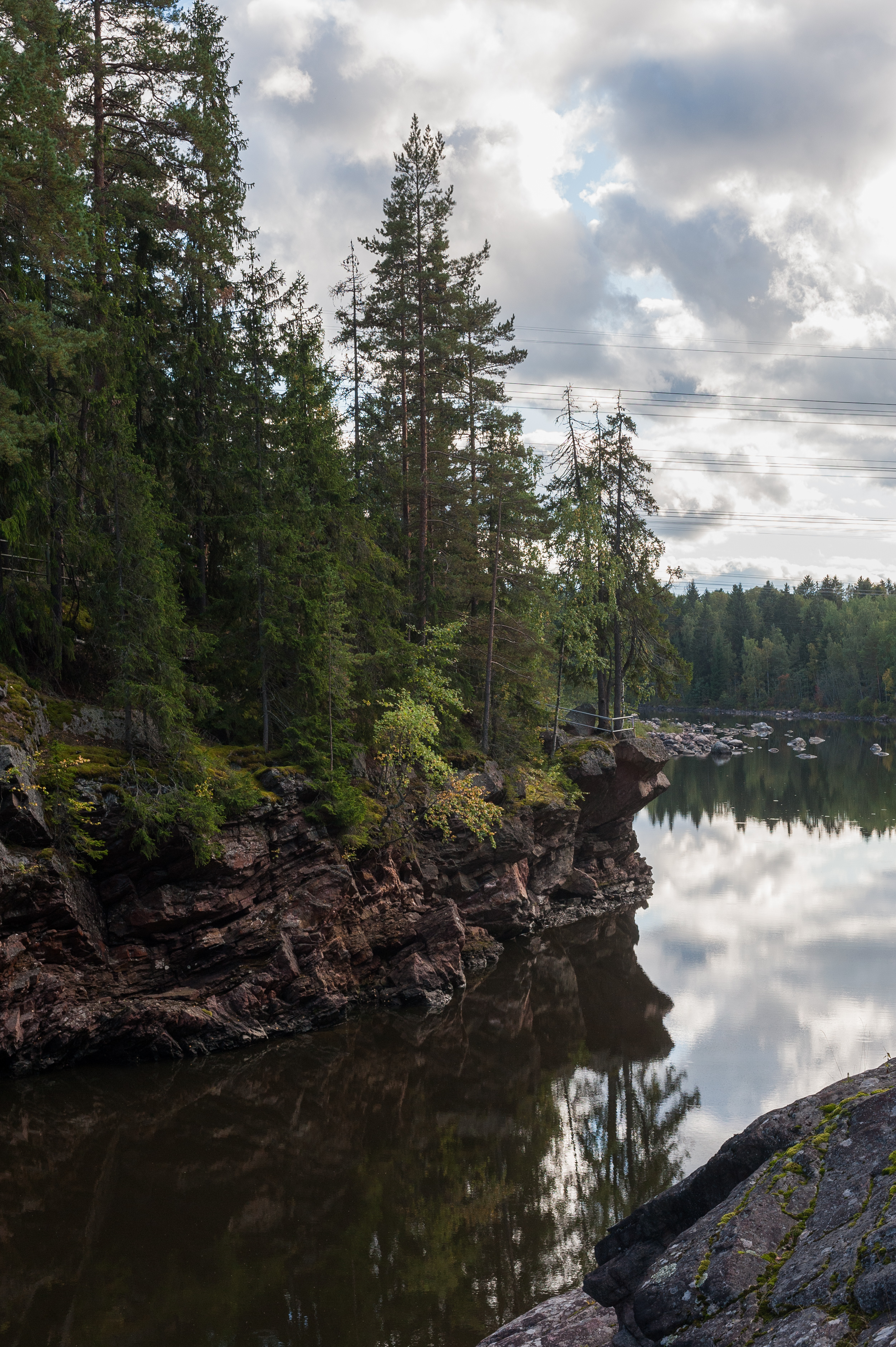
Nature around Imatrankoski

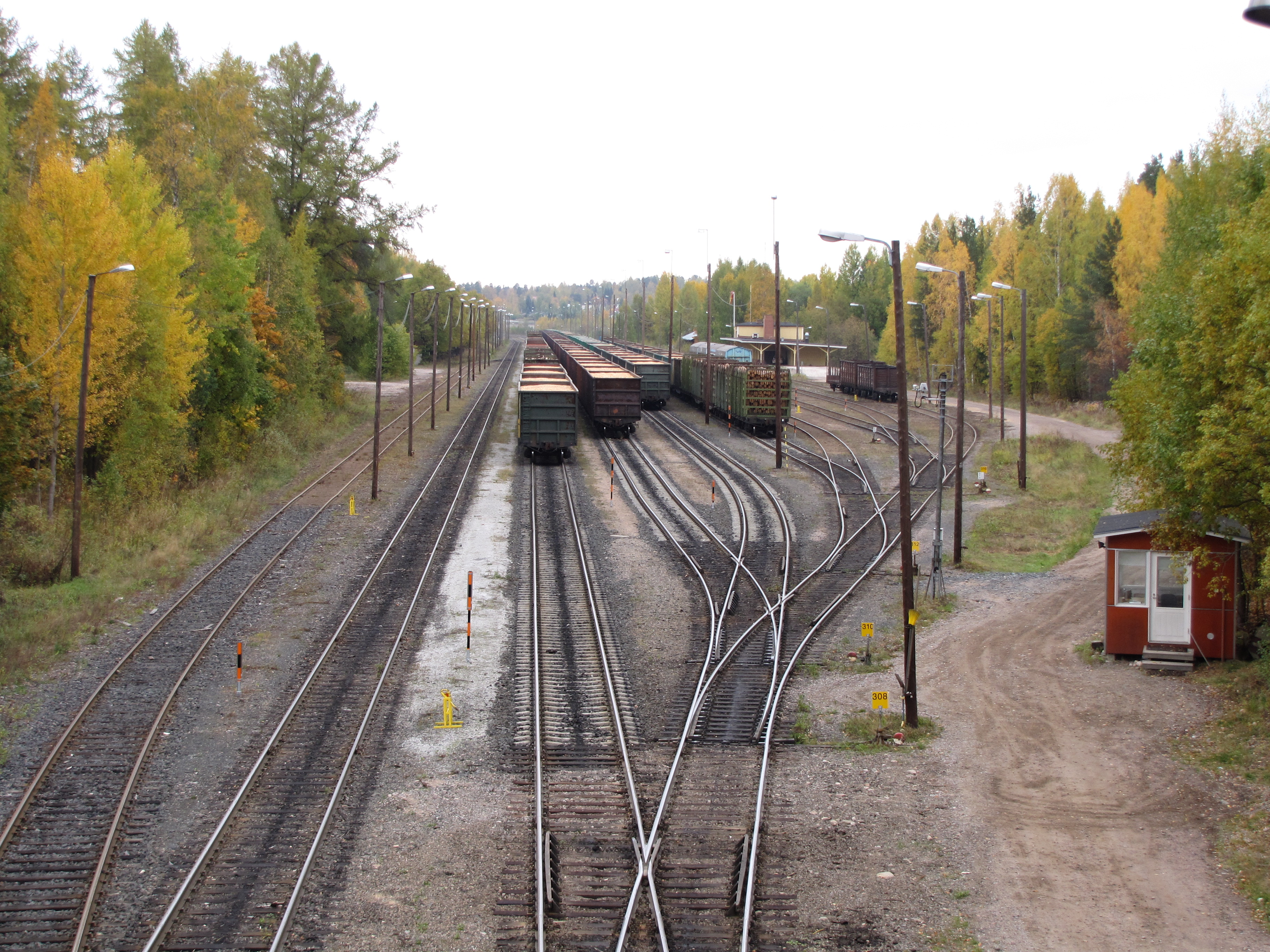
Imatrankoski rail yard

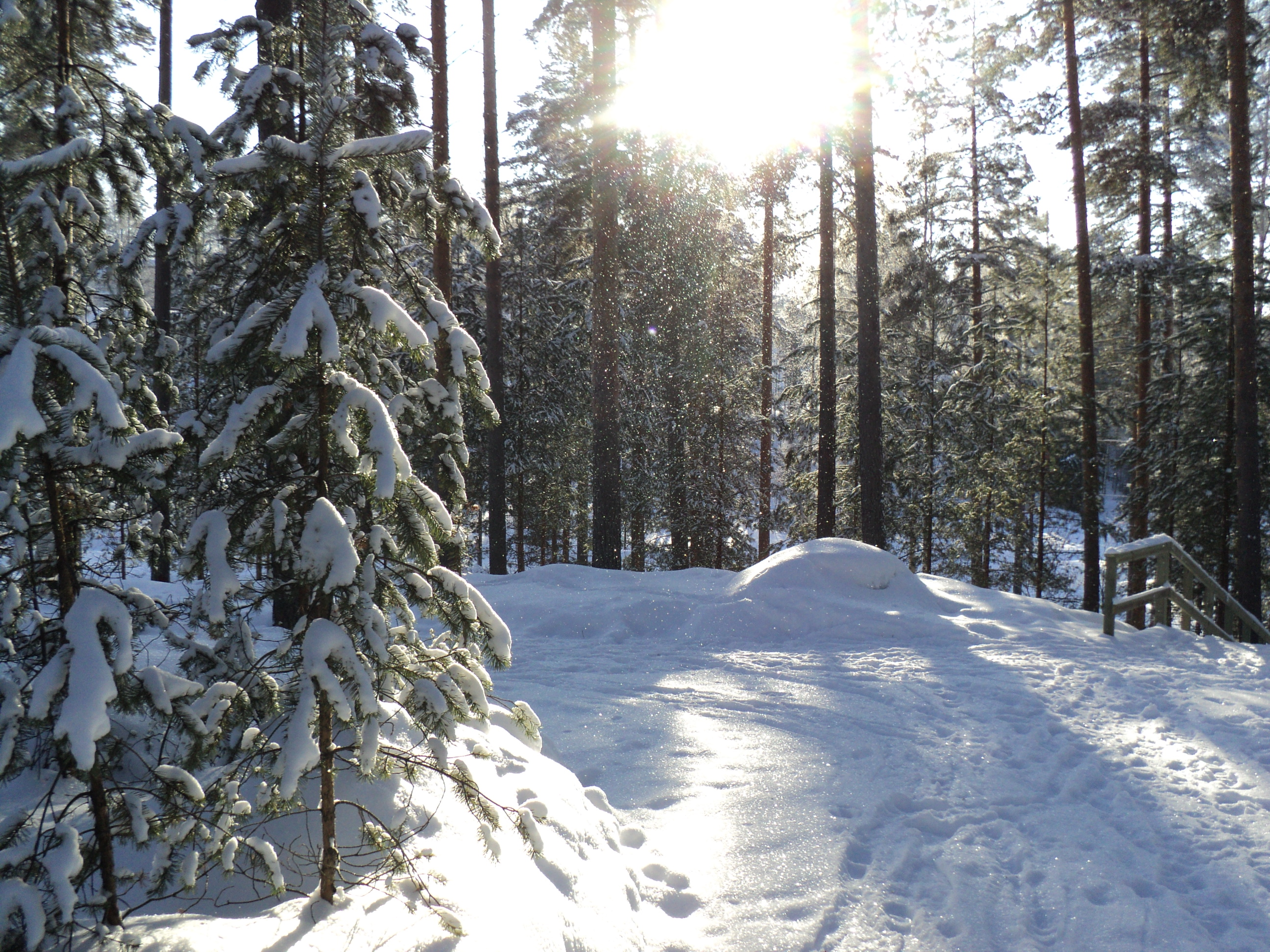
Imatra in winter

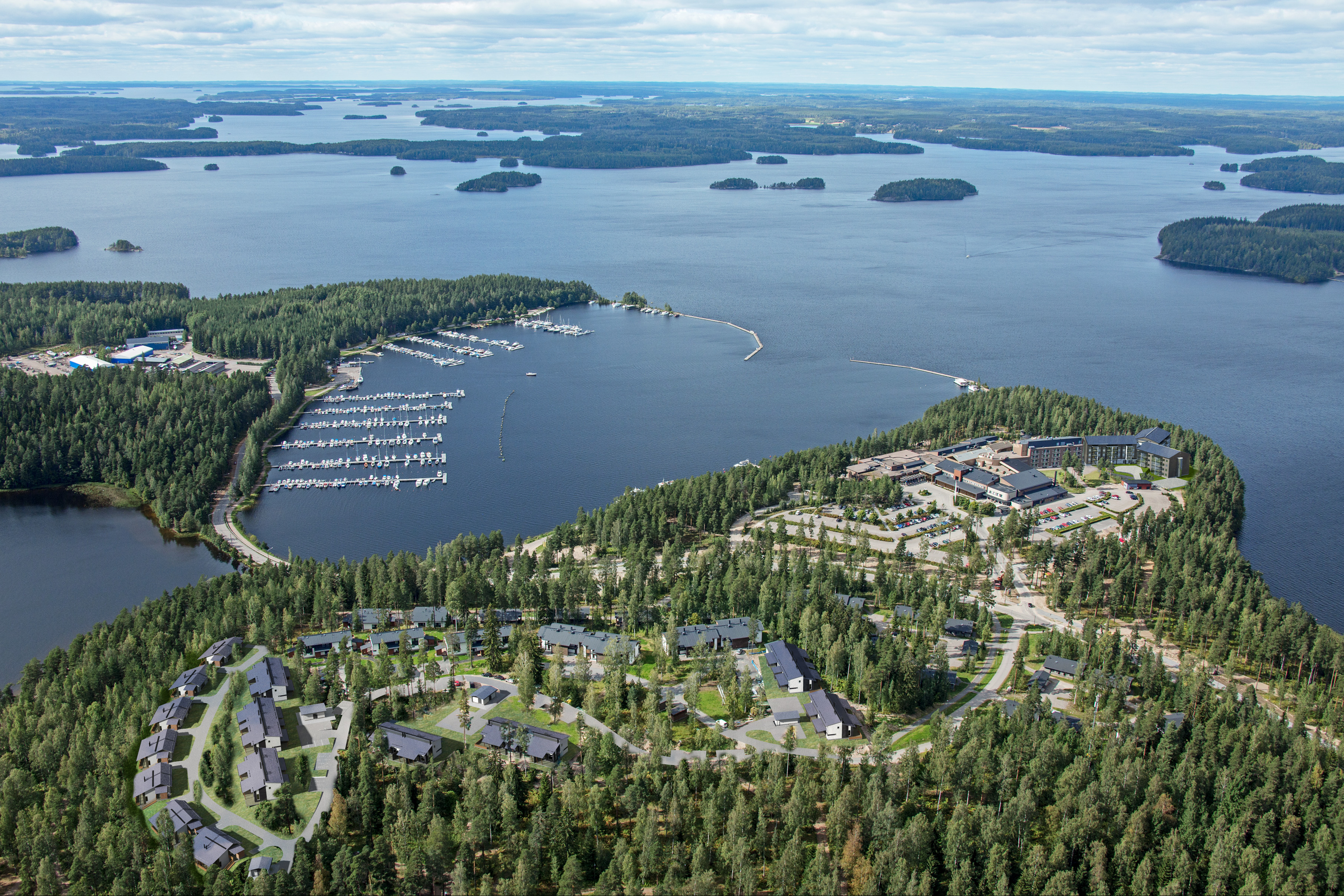
Lake Saimaa and Imatra Spa Hotel

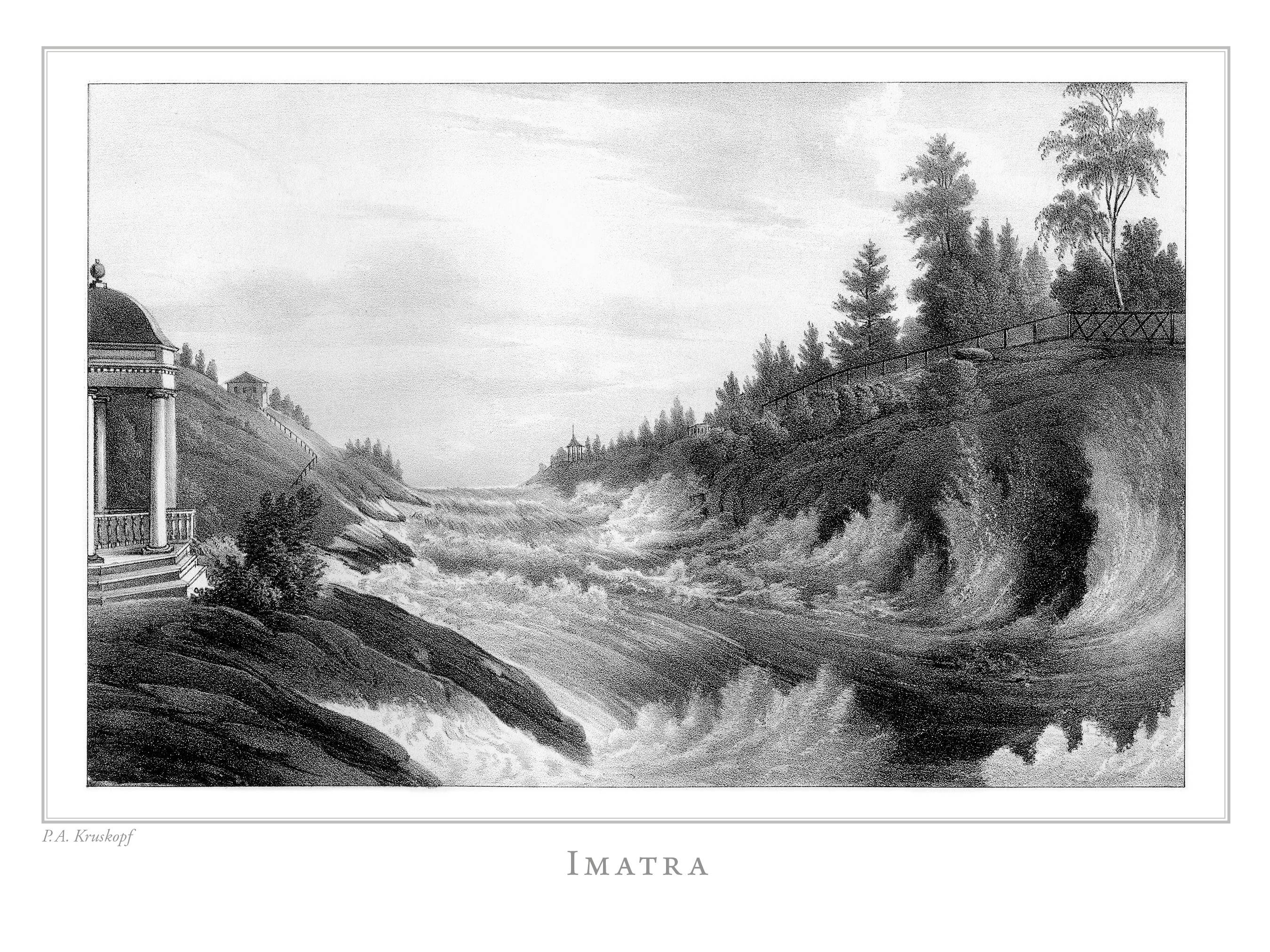
Illustration of Imatra in Finland framstäldt i teckningar edited by Zacharias Topelius and published 1845-1852.

== See also ==
- Imatra shooting
- Svetogorsk
