= Iisalmen Peli-Karhut =

- City: Iisalmi, Finland
- League: Mestis
- Founded: 1966
- Home arena: Kankaan jäähalli (capacity: 1,326)
- Colours
- General manager: Jarmo Ylisipola
- Head coach: Marko Tuomainen
- Captain: Samuel Timonen
- Affiliate: KalPa (SM-liiga) — JHT (Suomi-sarja) — SuKiKa (II-divisioona)
- Website: http://www.ipk.fi/etusivu
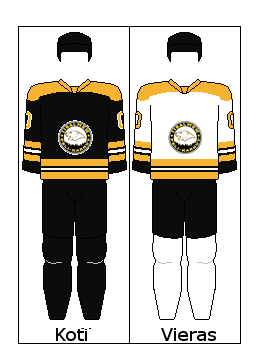

Iisalmen Peli-Karhut, or IPK for short, is a Finnish ice hockey team based in Iisalmi, Finland, playing in the second-tier league Mestis. The club was founded in 1966. They play their home games in the Kankaan jäähalli.

== History ==
Iisalmen Peli-Karhut were established in 1966. IPK was promoted to the Mestis from Suomi-sarja in 2016. IPK Iisalmi won the 2024 Mestis championship, beating Imatran Ketterä in the finals. Additionally, IPK won the Mestis bronze medal in 2021 and silver medal in 2025.
