= 2018–19 Mestis season =

2018–19 Mestis
- League: Mestis
- Sport: Ice hockey
- Duration: September 2018 – April 2019
- Number of teams: 12

Regular season
- Best record: Hermes
- Runners-up: LeKi
- Top scorer: Miro-Pekka Saarelainen (K-Vantaa)

Playoffs
- Playoffs MVP: Sameli Ventelä (Ketterä)
- Finals champions: Ketterä
- Runners-up: KeuPa HT

Mestis seasons
- ← 2017–18 2019–20 →

The 2018–19 Mestis season is the 19th season of Mestis, the second highest level of ice hockey in Finland after Liiga. KOOVEE was promoted from Suomi-sarja due to Espoo United declaring bankruptcy at the end of last season.

== Clubs ==
Mestis team map

Team	City	Home arena, capacity	Founded	Head coach
Hermes	Kokkola	Kokkolan jäähalli, 4,200	1953	(Finland) Janne Tuunanen
IPK	Iisalmi	Kankaan jäähalli, 1,326	1966	(Finland) ~~Janne Sinkkonen~~ 3.1.2019 (Finland) Tommi Miettinen
Jokipojat	Joensuu	Mehtimäki Ice Hall, 4,800	1953	(Finland) Jouni Varis
Ketterä	Imatra	Imatra Spa Areena, 1,200	1957	(Finland) Maso Lehtonen
KeuPa HT	Keuruu	Keuruun Jäähalli, 1,100	1995	(Finland) Niko Härkönen
K-Vantaa	Vantaa	Trio Areena, 2,004	1994	(Finland) ~~Simo Mälkiä~~ 28.1.2019 (Finland) Reijo Ruotsalainen
KOOVEE	Tampere	Hakametsä 2, 1050	1929	(Finland) Juha Pajuoja
LeKi	Lempäälä	Masku Areena, 800	1904	(Finland) Miikka Kuusela
Peliitat	Heinola	Versowood Areena, 2,975	1984	(Finland) ~~Jani Keinänen~~ 9.2.2019 (Finland) Vesa Petäjä
RoKi	Rovaniemi	Lappi Areena, 3,500	1979	(Finland) Santeri Immonen
SaPKo	Savonlinna	Talvisalo ice rink, 2,833	1929	(Finland) Pasi Räsänen
TUTO Hockey	Turku	Marli Areena, 3,000	1929	(Finland) Miika Elomo

== Regular season ==
Top eight advance to the Mestis playoffs while the bottom two face the top two teams from Suomi-sarja for a relegation playoff. Since the highest series of Finnish hockey is a closed series no team will be promoted to Liiga.

Pos	Team	Pld	W	OTW	OTL	L	GF	GA	GD	Pts	Final result
1	Hermes	50	29	3	2	16	180	133	+47	95	Advance to playoffs
2	LeKi	50	26	7	3	14	194	155	+39	95	Advance to playoffs
3	Ketterä	50	22	7	7	14	163	141	+22	87	Advance to playoffs
4	SaPKo	50	22	5	5	18	177	159	+18	81	Advance to playoffs
5	TUTO Hockey	50	20	8	4	18	151	130	+21	80	Advance to playoffs
6	Jokipojat	50	19	6	8	17	151	151	0	77	Advance to playoffs
7	RoKi	50	18	5	7	20	138	164	−26	71	Advance to playoffs
8	KeuPa HT	50	18	5	5	22	151	139	+12	69	Advance to playoffs
9	IPK	50	20	3	2	25	160	180	−20	68	
10	K-Vantaa	50	17	4	6	23	138	158	−20	65	
11	Peliitat	50	14	6	9	21	134	158	−24	63	Qualification to the relegation playoffs
12	KOOVEE	50	13	3	4	30	141	210	−69	49	Qualification to the relegation playoffs

Source: Tilastopalvelu.fi

Rules for classification: 1) Points; 2) Goal difference; 3) Goals scored; 4) Head-to-head points; 5) Penalty minutes.

== Playoffs ==
Playoffs are being played in three stages. Each stage is a best-of-7 series. The teams are reseeded after the quarterfinals, so that the best team by regular season performance to make the semifinals faces the worst team in the semifinals.

=== Bracket ===
Quarterfinals
1	Hermes	2
8	KeuPa HT	4
2	LeKi	4
7	RoKi	2
3	Ketterä	4
6	Jokipojat	1
4	SaPKo	2
5	TUTO Hockey	4

Semifinals
2	LeKi	2
8	KeuPa HT	4
3	Ketterä	4
5	TUTO Hockey	0

Finals
3	Ketterä	4
8	KeuPa HT	1
Third place
2	LeKi	0
5	TUTO Hockey	1

=== Quarterfinals ===
Hermes – KeuPa HT 2-4
19.3.2019	Hermes	KeuPa HT	5-0 ref
21.3.2019	KeuPa HT	Hermes	3-4 OT2 ref
23.3.2019	Hermes	KeuPa HT	1-3 ref
25.3.2019	KeuPa HT	Hermes	6-3 ref
27.3.2019	Hermes	KeuPa HT	2-3 OT1 ref
29.3.2019	KeuPa HT	Hermes	6-3 ref
KeuPa HT wins the series 4-2.

Ketterä – Jokipojat 4-1
19.3.2019	Ketterä	Jokipojat	2-4 ref
21.3.2019	Jokipojat	Ketterä	2-3 OT1 ref
23.3.2019	Ketterä	Jokipojat	2-1 ref
25.3.2019	Jokipojat	Ketterä	3-7 ref
27.3.2019	Ketterä	Jokipojat	7-0 ref
Ketterä wins the series 4-1.

LeKi – RoKi 4-2
19.3.2019	LeKi	RoKi	2-1 ref
20.3.2019	LeKi	RoKi	4-2 ref
23.3.2019	RoKi	LeKi	2-5 ref
24.3.2019	RoKi	LeKi	8-6 ref
26.3.2019	LeKi	RoKi	2-3 OT1 ref
28.3.2019	RoKi	LeKi	2-6 ref
LeKi wins the series 4-2.

SaPKo – TUTO Hockey 2-4
19.3.2019	SaPKo	TUTO Hockey	1-5 ref
20.3.2019	TUTO Hockey	SaPKo	0-1 ref
22.3.2019	SaPKo	TUTO Hockey	1-3 ref
24.3.2019	TUTO Hockey	SaPKo	5-0 ref
27.3.2019	SaPKo	TUTO Hockey	9-2 ref
28.3.2019	TUTO Hockey	SaPKo	3-2 OT1 ref
TUTO Hockey wins the series 4-2.

=== Semifinals ===
LeKi – KeuPa HT 2-4
2.4.2019	LeKi	KeuPa HT	2-4 ref
4.4.2019	KeuPa HT	LeKi	3-2 ref
6.4.2019	LeKi	KeuPa HT	3-2 ref
8.4.2019	KeuPa HT	LeKi	3-6 ref
10.4.2019	LeKi	KeuPa HT	5-8 ref
12.4.2019	KeuPa HT	LeKi	4-2 ref
KeuPa HT wins the series 4-2.

Ketterä – TUTO Hockey 4-0
2.4.2019	Ketterä	TUTO Hockey	5-3 ref
4.4.2019	TUTO Hockey	Ketterä	1-2 ref
6.4.2019	Ketterä	TUTO Hockey	5-2 ref
8.4.2019	TUTO Hockey	Ketterä	2-3 ref
Ketterä wins the series 4-0.

=== Bronze medal game ===
17 April 2019; 18:30	LeKi	1–3 (0–0, 0–2, 1–1)	TUTO Hockey	Masku Areena, Lempäälä; Attendance: 611

Game reference

Kimmo Rautiainen
Goalies
Julius Pohjanoksa
Referees:
Juho Ylä-Rotiala
Pekka Virta
Linesmen:
Niklas Narvanmaa
Oskari Isolauri

	0–1	23:03 – Friman (A. Mäkinen, M. Mäkinen)
	0–2	35:21 – Rouhiainen (Salminen, Viitasalo)
Vanhatalo (Laakso, Latvala)	1–2
	1–3	59:52 – M. Mäkinen EN

4 min
Penalties
6 min
29
Shots
33

=== Finals ===
16 April 2019; 18:30	Ketterä	5–4 (1–1, 2–2, 2–1)	KeuPa HT	Kisapuisto, Lappeenranta; Attendance: 4,820

Game reference

Karolus Kaarlehto
Goalies
Samuli Tervo
Referees:
Ville Vuohtoniemi
Sakari Suominen
Linesmen:
Miro Skinnarla
Joni Pekkala

	0–1	11:29 – Mörsky (Pelamo, Jani Siekkinen) PP1
Lipiäinen – 17:39	1–1
Alho (Ventelä, Rasmus Hämäläinen) – 21:11	2–1
	2–2	23:03 – Pihlajamäki (Stråka, Pulliainen
	2–3	24:52 – Luhtalampi (Lehtonen)
Kestilä (Karjalainen, Mäntykivi) – 28:29	3–3
Jääskeläinen PS – 47:59	4–3
	4–4	54:22 – Pelamo PP1
Lipiäinen (Juntheikki) – 59:51	5–4

8 min
Penalties
8 min
36
Shots
22

18 April 2019; 18:30	KeuPa HT	2–3 (1–1, 0–2, 1–0)	Ketterä	Keuruu Ice Hall, Keuruu; Attendance: 900

Game reference

Karolus Kaarlehto
Goalies
Samuli Tervo
Referees:
Janne Mäkisalo
Mika Levänen
Linesmen:
Joonas Hurskainen
Onni Hautamäki

Viinikainen (Siekkinen, Tervo) – 05:03	1–0
	1–1	11:13 – Jääskeläinen (Lipiäinen, Juntheikki) PP
	1–2	24:32 – Jääskeläinen (Juntheikki, Lipiäinen) PP
	1–3	29:27 – Lippojoki (Juntheikki, Lipiäinen)
Siekkinen (Pelamo, Honka)	2–3

10 min
Penalties
8 min
20
Shots
30

20 April 2019; 17:00	Ketterä	2–1 OT1 (0–0, 0–1, 1–0, 1–0)	KeuPa HT	Imatra Spa Areena, Imatra; Attendance: 1,225

Game reference

Karolus Kaarlehto
Goalies
Samuli Tervo
Referees:
Ville Vuohtoniemi
Sakari Suominen
Linesmen:
Miro Skinnarla
Joni Pekkala

	0–1	26:18 – Kumpulainen (Huttu, Pihlajamäki)
Niemi (Paalanen, Haaparanta) – 51:50	1–1
Karjalainen – 61:05	2–1

8 min
Penalties
6 min
35
Shots
29

22 April 2019; 17:00	KeuPa HT	2–1 OT1 (0–0, 1–0, 0–1, 1–0)	Ketterä	Keuruu Ice Hall, Keuruu; Attendance: 749

Game reference

Samuli Tervo
Goalies
Karolus Kaarlehto
Referees:
Janne Mäkisalo
Mika Levänen
Linesmen:
Joonas Hurskainen
Onni Hautamäki

Turtiainen (Huttu, Kumpulainen) PP1 – 38:58	1–0
	1–1	55:55 – Mäntykivi (Karjalainen, Hämäläinen) PP1
Huttu (Ollitervo) – 63:24	2–1

8 min
Penalties
4 min
20
Shots
22

24 April 2019; 18:30	Ketterä	3–2 (2–2, 1–0, 0–0)	KeuPa HT	Imatra Spa Areena, Imatra; Attendance: 1,300

Game reference

Karolus Kaarlehto
Goalies
Samuli Tervo
Referees:
Ville Vuohtoniemi
Sakari Suominen
Linesmen:
Miro Skinnarla
Joni Pekkala

	0–1	10:28 – Huttu (Viinikainen, Kumpulainen)
Juntheikki (Ventelä) – 12:16	1–1
Hämäläinen SH1 – 13:46	2–1
	2–2	15:52 – Piipponen
Ripatti (Jääskeläinen) – 39:51	3–2

10 min
Penalties
10 min
38
Shots
29

Ketterä wins the finals 4-1.

== Relegation playoffs ==
The bottom two teams faced the top two teams from Suomi-sarja for a best-of-7 series were the winners got a place in Mestis for the next season. Peliitat and KOOVEE both won their series and thus avoided relegation.

Peliitat – Hunters 4-0
23.3.2019	Peliitat	Hunters	4-0 ref
26.3.2019	Hunters	Peliitat	2-4 ref
28.3.2019	Peliitat	Hunters	6-0 ref
30.3.2019	Hunters	Peliitat	2-5 ref
Peliitat wins the series 4-0 and avoids relegation.

KOOVEE – Hokki 4-0
24.3.2019	KOOVEE	Hokki	4-2 ref
26.3.2019	Hokki	KOOVEE	1-5 ref
28.3.2019	KOOVEE	Hokki	3-2 ref
30.3.2019	Hokki	KOOVEE	2-3 ref
KOOVEE wins the series 4-0 and avoids relegation.

== See also ==
- 2018–19 Liiga season
