= Janne Kumpulainen =

Finnish ice hockey left winger

- Born: 12 March 1991 (age 34) Jyväskylä, Finland
- Height: 5 ft 9 in (175 cm)
- Weight: 176 lb (80 kg; 12 st 8 lb)
- Position: Left wing
- Shot: Left
- Mestis team Former teams: KeuPa HT; Jukurit
- Playing career: 2010–2021

Janne Kumpulainen (born 12 March 1991) is a Finnish professional ice hockey left winger currently playing for KeuPa HT in Mestis.

Kumpulainen previously played in Liiga for Jukurit, playing 46 games for the team between 2016 and 2018.

== Career statistics ==
			Regular season					Playoffs
Season	Team	League	GP	G	A	Pts	PIM	GP	G	A	Pts	PIM
2005–06	JYP Jyväskylä U16	U16 SM-sarja Q	11	7	15	22	2	—	—	—	—	—
2005–06	JYP Jyväskylä U16	U16 SM-sarja	11	2	8	10	0	3	2	1	3	0
2006–07	JYP Jyväskylä U16	U16 SM-sarja Q	11	15	26	41	6	—	—	—	—	—
2006–07	JYP Jyväskylä U16	U16 SM-sarja	8	7	14	21	8	—	—	—	—	—
2006–07	JYP Jyväskylä U18	U18 SM-sarja	7	4	6	10	2	—	—	—	—	—
2007–08	JYP Jyväskylä U18	U18 SM-sarja	35	12	21	33	28	—	—	—	—	—
2008–09	JYP Jyväskylä U18	U18 I-Divisioona	3	5	7	12	2	—	—	—	—	—
2008–09	JYP Jyväskylä U20	U20 SM-liiga	36	7	11	18	2	—	—	—	—	—
2009–10	JYP Jyväskylä U20	U20 SM-liiga	32	12	19	31	16	—	—	—	—	—
2009–10	D Team	Mestis	3	0	0	0	0	—	—	—	—	—
2010–11	JYP Jyväskylä U20	U20 SM-liiga	22	6	11	17	6	13	2	4	6	6
2010–11	D Team	Mestis	8	0	1	1	2	—	—	—	—	—
2010–11	Suomi U20	Mestis	4	1	2	3	2	—	—	—	—	—
2011–12	JYP Jyväskylä U20	U20 SM-liiga	3	1	2	3	2	2	0	0	0	2
2011–12	JYP-Akatemia	Mestis	27	5	6	11	6	—	—	—	—	—
2012–13	Nice hockey Côte d'Azur	France2	26	9	12	21	8	2	0	2	2	2
2013–14	KeuPa HT	Suomi-sarja	28	16	24	40	24	8	4	8	12	4
2014–15	KeuPa HT	Mestis	34	6	18	24	32	—	—	—	—	—
2015–16	SaPKo	Mestis	50	15	31	46	10	5	0	1	1	2
2016–17	Mikkelin Jukurit	Liiga	31	4	7	11	6	—	—	—	—	—
2016–17	Iisalmen Peli-Karhut	Mestis	2	0	2	2	0	—	—	—	—	—
2017–18	Mikkelin Jukurit	Liiga	15	0	0	0	0	—	—	—	—	—
2017–18	Imatran Ketterä	Mestis	27	8	14	22	2	4	1	0	1	2
2018–19	KeuPa HT	Mestis	47	14	22	36	10	17	7	11	18	4
2019–20	KeuPa HT	Mestis	43	8	31	39	30	—	—	—	—	—
2019–20	JYP Jyväskylä	Liiga	2	0	1	1	2	—	—	—	—	—
2020–21	KeuPa HT	Mestis	29	3	14	17	4	3	2	0	2	0
2020–21	JYP Jyväskylä	Liiga	1	0	0	0	0	—	—	—	—	—
Liiga totals			49	4	8	12	8	—	—	—	—	—
Mestis totals			274	60	141	201	98	29	10	12	22	8
