= Teemu Huttu =

Finnish ice hockey centre

- Born: May 26, 1991 (age 33); Kiiminki, Finland
- Height: 5 ft 11 in (180 cm)
- Weight: 174 lb (79 kg; 12 st 6 lb)
- Position: Centre
- Shot: Left
- Hockeyettan team Former teams: Visby/Roma HK; Kiekko-Laser; Hokki; SaPKo; KeuPa HT; Kokkolan Hermes
- Playing career: 2011–2020

Teemu Huttu (born May 26, 1991) is a Finnish professional ice hockey centre who currently plays for Visby/Roma HK in Hockeyettan, the third-tier league in Sweden.

== Career ==
Huttu began his career playing for Kärpät's junior teams but was unable to feature in their senior team. He joined Kiekko-Laser for the 2011–12 Mestis season but the team went bankrupt by December and he eventually returned to Kärpät's U20 team.

On June 30, 2012, Huttu joined Hokki in Mestis for one season, which then followed by single season spells at SaPKo, KeuPa HT and Kokkolan before returning to Hokki on May 20, 2016, again for one season. He then rejoined KeuPa HT on April 28, 2017, and signed an extension with the team for a second season on September 18, 2018.

On July 1, 2019, Huttu moved to Sweden to sign for Visby/Roma in the Hockeyettan.

== Career statistics ==
			Regular season					Playoffs
Season	Team	League	GP	G	A	Pts	PIM	GP	G	A	Pts	PIM
2006–07	Oulun Kärpät U16	U16 SM-sarja Q	11	9	20	29	4	—	—	—	—	—
2006–07	Oulun Kärpät U16	U16 SM-sarja	13	5	16	21	12	7	1	7	8	8
2008–09	Oulun Kärpät U18	U18 SM-sarja	24	6	15	21	18	6	3	1	4	2
2008–09	Oulun Kärpät U20	U20 SM-liiga	—	—	—	—	—	—	—	—	—	—
2009–10	Oulun Kärpät U20	U20 SM-liiga	30	6	22	28	16	12	4	5	9	8
2010–11	Oulun Kärpät U20	U20 SM-liiga	42	13	27	40	38	—	—	—	—	—
2010–11	Suomi U20	Mestis	1	0	0	0	0	—	—	—	—	—
2011–12	Kiekko-Laser	Mestis	—	—	—	—	—	—	—	—	—	—
2011–12	Kemin Lämärit	Suomi-sarja	2	1	1	2	0	—	—	—	—	—
2011–12	Oulun Kärpät U20	U20 SM-liiga	5	0	1	1	12	—	—	—	—	—
2012–13	Hokki	Mestis	33	7	7	14	12	3	1	1	2	2
2012–13	Iisalmen Peli-Karhut	Suomi-sarja	2	1	4	5	2	—	—	—	—	—
2013–14	SaPKo	Mestis	39	6	12	18	22	—	—	—	—	—
2014–15	KeuPa HT	Mestis	47	11	18	29	38	4	0	0	0	2
2015–16	Kokkolan Hermes	Mestis	47	16	19	35	34	7	1	2	3	2
2016–17	Hokki	Mestis	33	4	8	12	20	—	—	—	—	—
2017–18	KeuPa HT	Mestis	46	13	25	38	38	14	4	6	10	37
2018–19	KeuPa HT	Mestis	45	9	21	30	12	17	5	8	13	16
2019–20	Visby/Roma HK	Hockeyettan	40	17	19	36	43	—	—	—	—	—
Mestis totals			291	66	110	176	176	45	11	17	28	59
