= Jesse Pelamo =

Finnish ice hockey player

- Born: 22 June 1994 (age 30); Tampere, Finland
- Height: 191 cm (6 ft 3 in)
- Weight: 88 kg (194 lb; 13 st 12 lb)
- Position: Center
- Shoots: Left
- team Former teams: Free agent KeuPa HT; KOOVEE; Lempäälän Kisa; Lukko
- Playing career: 2015–present

Jesse Pelamo (born 22 June 1994) is a Finnish professional ice hockey player.

== Playing career ==
Pelamo played one game in the Liiga for Lukko during the 2017–18 season.

== Career statistics ==
=== Regular season and playoffs ===
			Regular season					Playoffs
Season	Team	League	GP	G	A	Pts	PIM	GP	G	A	Pts	PIM
2015–16	KeuPa HT	Mestis	45	6	8	14	18	10	0	1	1	6
2015–16	KOOVEE	Suomi-sarja	2	2	2	4	2	—	—	—	—	—
2016–17	Lempäälän Kisa	Mestis	21	1	3	4	10	—	—	—	—	—
2016–17	KOOVEE	Suomi-sarja	2	0	0	0	2	—	—	—	—	—
2016–17	KeuPa HT	Mestis	18	2	8	10	6	4	1	4	5	2
2017–18	KeuPa HT	Mestis	42	13	29	42	24	14	1	9	10	10
2017–18	Lukko	Liiga	1	0	0	0	0	—	—	—	—	—
2018–19	KeuPa HT	Mestis	46	15	24	39	42	16	4	12	16	10
Liiga totals			1	0	0	0	0	—	—	—	—	—
