= Aleksi Mäkelä (ice hockey, born 1995) =

Finnish ice hockey player

- Born: 8 February 1995 (age 31) Tampere, Finland
- Height: 6 ft 2 in (188 cm)
- Weight: 205 lb (93 kg; 14 st 9 lb)
- Position: Defence
- Shot: Left
- Played for: Ilves; Ässät
- NHL draft: 182nd overall, 2013; Dallas Stars
- Playing career: 2013–2021

Aleksi Mäkelä (born 8 February 1995) is a Finnish former professional ice hockey defenceman who played in the top ranked Liiga. Mäkelä was selected by the Dallas Stars in the seventh round, 182nd overall, of the 2013 NHL entry draft.

== Playing career ==
Mäkelä made his SM-liiga debut playing with Ilves during the 2012–13 SM-liiga season.

Following two full seasons in the Liiga with Ässät, Mäkelä left as a free agent to secure a one-year contract with second division Mestis club, Lempäälän Kisa, on August 14, 2018.

== Career statistics ==
=== Regular season and playoffs ===
			Regular season					Playoffs
Season	Team	League	GP	G	A	Pts	PIM	GP	G	A	Pts	PIM
2011–12	Ilves	Jr. A	4	0	0	0	2	—	—	—	—	—
2012–13	Ilves	Jr. A	37	8	9	17	42	—	—	—	—	—
2012–13	Ilves	SM-l	7	1	1	2	4	—	—	—	—	—
2013–14	Ilves	Jr. A	25	3	11	14	16	2	0	0	0	0
2013–14	Ilves	Liiga	9	0	0	0	4	—	—	—	—	—
2013–14	LeKi	Mestis	3	0	0	0	2	—	—	—	—	—
2014–15	Ilves	Liiga	30	0	6	6	22	—	—	—	—	—
2014–15	LeKi	Mestis	7	0	0	0	4	—	—	—	—	—
2015–16	Ilves	Liiga	42	0	2	2	20	—	—	—	—	—
2015–16	LeKi	Mestis	12	0	2	2	10	—	—	—	—	—
2015–16	Ilves	Jr. A	1	0	0	0	2	7	1	0	1	2
2016–17	Ässät	Liiga	48	0	2	2	26	3	0	0	0	0
2017–18	Ässät	Liiga	33	1	1	2	6	—	—	—	—	—
2018–19	LeKi	Mestis	43	3	8	11	26	2	0	0	0	2
2019–20	Drakkars de Caen	FRA.1	19	2	8	10	14	3	1	2	3	0
2020–21	Remparts de Tours	FRA.1	12	0	3	3	16	—	—	—	—	—
2025–26	Kiekko-Ahma	2. Divisioona	17	6	4	10	10	5	0	3	3	0
Liiga totals			169	2	12	14	82	3	0	0	0	0

=== International ===
Year	Team	Event	Result	GP	G	A	Pts	PIM
2015	Finland	WJC	7th	5	0	1	1	4
Junior totals				5	0	1	1	4
