= 2017–18 Mestis season =

2017–18 Mestis
- League: Mestis
- Sport: Ice hockey
- Duration: September 2017 – March 2018
- Number of teams: 12

Regular season
- Best record: KeuPa HT
- Runners-up: SaPKo
- Top scorer: Joona Jääskeläinen

Playoffs
- Finals champions: KeuPa HT
- Runners-up: TUTO Hockey

Mestis seasons
- ← 2016–17 2018–19 →

The 2017–18 Mestis season is the 18th season of Mestis, the second highest level of ice hockey in Finland after Liiga. Imatran Ketterä was promoted from Suomi-sarja at the end of last season, while JYP-Akatemia and Hokki faced bankruptcy and were relegated.

== Clubs ==
Team	City	Home arena, capacity	Founded	Head coach
Espoo United	Espoo	Espoo Metro Areena, 6,982	2016	(Finland) Niko Marttila
Hermes	Kokkola	Kokkolan jäähalli, 4,200	1953	(Finland) ~~Antti Karhula~~; 14.12.2017 (Finland) Ari-Pekka Pajuluoma
IPK	Iisalmi	Kankaan jäähalli, 1,358	1966	(Finland) Janne Sinkkonen
Jokipojat	Joensuu	Mehtimäki Ice Hall, 4,800	1953	(Finland) Jouni Varis
Ketterä	Imatra	Imatra Spa Areena, 1,300	1957	(Finland) Maso Lehtonen
KeuPa HT	Keuruu	Keuruun Jäähalli, 1,100	1995	(Finland) Mikko Heiskanen
Kiekko-Vantaa	Vantaa	Trio Areena, 2,004	1994	(Finland) Pasi Arvonen
LeKi	Lempäälä	Masku Areena, 900	1904	(Finland) Miikka Kuusela
Peliitat	Heinola	Versowood Areena, 2,686	1984	(Finland) ~~Santeri Heiskanen~~; 1.3.2018 (Finland) Jani Keinänen
RoKi	Rovaniemi	Lappi Areena, 3,500	1979	(Finland) Petri Karjalainen
SaPKo	Savonlinna	Talvisalo ice rink, 2,833	1929	(Finland) Pasi Räsänen
TUTO Hockey	Turku	Marli Areena, 3,000	1929	(Finland) Miika Elomo

== Regular season ==
Top eight advance to the Mestis playoffs while the bottom two face the top two teams from Suomi-sarja for a relegation playoff. Since the highest series of Finnish hockey is a closed series no team will be promoted to Liiga.

Pos	Team	Pld	W	OTW	OTL	L	GF	GA	GD	Pts	Final Result
1	KeuPa HT	50	30	2	3	15	182	132	+50	97	Advance to playoffs
2	SaPKo	50	24	9	6	11	175	138	+37	96	Advance to playoffs
3	Ketterä	50	25	4	5	16	180	159	+21	88	Advance to playoffs
4	Kiekko-Vantaa	50	21	6	5	18	150	151	−1	80	Advance to playoffs
5	TUTO Hockey	50	21	4	8	17	166	129	+37	79	Advance to playoffs
6	Jokipojat	50	21	4	5	20	156	140	+16	76	Advance to playoffs
7	IPK	50	19	5	5	21	141	161	−20	72	Advance to playoffs
8	LeKi	50	16	9	5	20	146	149	−3	71	Advance to playoffs
9	Espoo United	50	18	6	3	23	141	147	−6	69	
10	RoKi	50	17	5	7	21	150	171	−21	68	
11	Hermes	50	14	4	9	23	142	186	−44	59	Qualification to the relegation playoffs
12	Peliitat	50	9	7	4	30	153	219	−66	45	Qualification to the relegation playoffs

Source: Tilastopalvelu.fi

Rules for classification: 1) Points; 2) Goal difference; 3) Goals scored; 4) Head-to-head points; 5) Penalty minutes.

== Playoffs ==
Playoffs are being played in three stages. Each stage is a best-of-7 series. The teams are reseeded after the quarterfinals, so that the best team by regular season performance to make the semifinals faces the worst team in the semifinals.

=== Bracket ===
Quarterfinals
1	KeuPa HT	4
8	LeKi	1
2	SaPKo	4
7	IPK	2
3	Ketterä	0
6	Jokipojat	4
4	Kiekko-Vantaa	1
5	TUTO Hockey	4

Semifinals
1	KeuPa HT	4
6	Jokipojat	0
2	SaPKo	3
5	TUTO Hockey	4

Finals
1	KeuPa HT	4
5	TUTO Hockey	2
Third place
2	SaPKo	1
6	Jokipojat	0

=== Quarterfinals ===
KeuPa HT – LeKi 4-1
10.3.2018	KeuPa HT	LeKi	7-1 ref
12.3.2018	LeKi	KeuPa HT	2-3 OT1 ref
14.3.2018	KeuPa HT	LeKi	2-0 ref
16.3.2018	LeKi	KeuPa HT	2-1 OT2 ref
17.3.2018	KeuPa HT	LeKi	4-0 ref
KeuPa HT wins the series 4-1.

Ketterä – Jokipojat 0-4
10.3.2018	Ketterä	Jokipojat	3-5 ref
12.3.2018	Jokipojat	Ketterä	5-3 ref
14.3.2018	Ketterä	Jokipojat	0-3 ref
16.3.2018	Jokipojat	Ketterä	4-2 ref
Jokipojat wins the series 4-0.

SaPKo – IPK 4-2
10.3.2018	SaPKo	IPK	7-3 ref
12.3.2018	IPK	SaPKo	6-3 ref
14.3.2018	SaPKo	IPK	4-1 ref
16.3.2018	IPK	SaPKo	7-6 ref
17.3.2018	SaPKo	IPK	6-3 ref
19.3.2018	IPK	SaPKo	4-5 OT1 ref
SaPKo wins the series 4-2.

Kiekko-Vantaa – TUTO Hockey 1-4
10.3.2018	Kiekko-Vantaa	TUTO Hockey	3-2 OT1 ref
12.3.2018	TUTO Hockey	Kiekko-Vantaa	6-2 ref
14.3.2018	Kiekko-Vantaa	TUTO Hockey	2-3 ref
16.3.2018	TUTO Hockey	Kiekko-Vantaa	3-0 ref
17.3.2018	Kiekko-Vantaa	TUTO Hockey	1-2 ref
TUTO Hockey wins the series 4-1.

=== Semifinals ===
KeuPa HT – Jokipojat 4-0
23.3.2018	KeuPa HT	Jokipojat	3-2 OT1 ref
24.3.2018	Jokipojat	KeuPa HT	1-2 ref
26.3.2018	KeuPa HT	Jokipojat	7-2 ref
28.3.2018	Jokipojat	KeuPa HT	2-3 ref
KeuPa HT wins the series 4-0.

SaPKo – TUTO Hockey 3-4
23.3.2018	SaPKo	TUTO Hockey	4-3 OT1 ref
24.3.2018	TUTO Hockey	SaPKo	4-3 OT1 ref
27.3.2018	SaPKo	TUTO Hockey	5-3 ref
29.3.2018	TUTO Hockey	SaPKo	2-1 ref
31.3.2018	SaPKo	TUTO Hockey	1-2 ref
1.4.2018	TUTO Hockey	SaPKo	1-2 ref
3.4.2018	SaPKo	TUTO Hockey	1-3 ref
TUTO Hockey wins the series 4-3.

=== Bronze medal game ===
6 April 2018; 18:30	SaPKo	3–1 (1–0, 0–0, 2–1)	Jokipojat	Winter Salon rink, Savonlinna; Attendance: 1,187

Game reference
22 min	Penalties	8 min
35	Shots	30

=== Finals ===
6 April 2018; 18:30	KeuPa HT	2–4 (0–2, 1–0, 1–2)	TUTO Hockey	Keuruu Ice Hall, Keuruu; Attendance: 985

Game reference
2 min	Penalties	2 min
26	Shots	28

8 April 2018; 17:00	TUTO Hockey	2–5 (0–4, 1–0, 1–1)	KeuPa HT	Kupittaan jäähalli, Turku; Attendance: 2,018

Game reference
12 min	Penalties	14 min
47	Shots	31

11 April 2018; 18:30	KeuPa HT	2–1 (1–1, 1–0, 0–0)	TUTO Hockey	Keuruu Ice Hall, Keuruu; Attendance: 867

Game reference
18 min	Penalties	8 min
22	Shots	27

13 April 2018; 18:15	TUTO Hockey	4–1 (1–0, 1–0, 2–1)	KeuPa HT	Kupittaan jäähalli, Turku; Attendance: 1,809

Game reference
4 min	Penalties	6 min
37	Shots	24

14 April 2018; 16:30	KeuPa HT	3–1 (1–0, 0–0, 2–1)	TUTO Hockey	Keuruu Ice Hall, Keuruu; Attendance: 938

Game reference
20 min	Penalties	22 min
22	Shots	16

16 April 2018; 18:15	TUTO Hockey	1–2 OT1 (0–1, 1–0, 0–0, 0–1)	KeuPa HT	Kupittaan jäähalli, Turku; Attendance: 1,748

Game reference
12 min	Penalties	14 min
34	Shots	34

KeuPa HT wins the series 4-2.

== Relegation playoffs ==
The bottom two teams will face the top two teams from Suomi-sarja for a best-of-7 series were the winners will get a place in Mestis for the next season.

Hermes – KOOVEE 4-1
16.3.2018	Hermes	KOOVEE	1-3 ref
17.3.2018	KOOVEE	Hermes	0-4 ref
21.3.2018	Hermes	KOOVEE	4-2 ref
23.3.2018	KOOVEE	Hermes	0-3 ref
24.3.2018	Hermes	KOOVEE	2-0 ref
Hermes wins the series 4-1 and avoids relegation.

Peliitat – JHT 4-0
16.3.2018	Peliitat	JHT	4-2 ref
17.3.2018	JHT	Peliitat	0-8 ref
21.3.2018	Peliitat	JHT	4-1 ref
23.3.2018	JHT	Peliitat	1-6 ref
Peliitat wins the series 4-0 and avoids relegation.

No team got relegated from or promoted to Mestis for the next season.

== See also ==
- 2017–18 Liiga season
