= Roni Allén =

Finnish ice hockey player

- Born: October 10, 1998 (age 28) Rovaniemi, Finland
- Height: 6 ft 0 in (183 cm)
- Weight: 200 lb (91 kg; 14 st 4 lb)
- Position: Defense
- Shoots: Left
- Liiga team Former teams: HC TPS; JYP Jyväskylä
- Playing career: 2017–present

Roni Allén (born October 10, 1998) is a Finnish professional ice hockey defenseman who is currently playing for HC TPS of the Liiga.

== Playing career ==
Allén has played as a youth from the age of 13 at the Junior C level with JYP. He made his professional Liiga debut with JYP during the 2017–18 season, appearing on the blueline in 8 scoreless games. He also appeared in 5 Champions Hockey League games, helping JYP as the first non Swedish club to capture the title.

On March 13, 2018, Allén as a developing two-way defenseman was signed to a three-year contract extension with JYP.

== Career statistics ==
			Regular season					Playoffs
Season	Team	League	GP	G	A	Pts	PIM	GP	G	A	Pts	PIM
2015–16	JYP Jyväskylä	Jr. A	3	0	0	0	0	—	—	—	—	—
2016–17	JYP Jyväskylä	Jr. A	40	4	21	25	20	3	0	0	0	0
2016–17	JYP-Akatemia	Mestis	6	0	0	0	2	—	—	—	—	—
2017–18	JYP Jyväskylä	Jr. A	32	4	12	16	38	4	1	1	2	6
2017–18	JYP Jyväskylä	Liiga	8	0	0	0	2	—	—	—	—	—
2017–18	RoKi	Mestis	2	0	0	0	2	—	—	—	—	—
2017–18	KeuPa HT	Mestis	6	0	2	2	4	5	0	0	0	2
2018–19	JYP Jyväskylä	Liiga	35	1	1	2	22	3	0	1	1	0
2018–19	KeuPa HT	Mestis	12	0	7	7	16	—	—	—	—	—
2019–20	JYP Jyväskylä	Liiga	52	1	9	10	30	—	—	—	—	—
2020–21	JYP Jyväskylä	Liiga	30	3	2	5	22	—	—	—	—	—
2021–22	TUTO Hockey	Mestis	23	3	8	11	20	—	—	—	—	—
2021–22	TPS	Liiga	10	1	1	2	4	—	—	—	—	—
Liiga totals			135	6	13	19	80	3	0	1	1	0

== Awards and honours ==
Award	Year
CHL
Champions (JYP)	2018
