= Joona Jääskeläinen =

Finnish ice hockey player

- Born: 5 September 1996 (age 30) Imatra, Finland
- Height: 178 cm (5 ft 10 in)
- Weight: 80 kg (176 lb; 12 st 8 lb)
- Position: Right wing
- Shoots: Right
- Slovak team Former teams: HC Košice; Kokkolan Hermes; SaiPa; Imatran Ketterä; Mikkelin Jukurit; HC ’05 Banská Bystrica; BK Mladá Boleslav; HC Slovan Bratislava
- Playing career: 2015–present

Joona Jääskeläinen (born 5 September 1996) is a Finnish professional ice hockey player who currently plays professionally for HK Spišská Nová Ves of the Slovak Extraliga.

== Career statistics ==
=== Regular season and playoffs ===
			Regular season					Playoffs
Season	Team	League	GP	G	A	Pts	PIM	GP	G	A	Pts	PIM
2012–13	SaiPa	Jr. A	2	0	0	0	0	—	—	—	—	—
2013–14	SaiPa	Jr. A	40	13	9	22	16	—	—	—	—	—
2014–15	SaiPa	Jr. A	18	11	8	19	6	7	6	1	7	0
2015–16	SaiPa	Jr. A	16	9	9	18	20	—	—	—	—	—
2015–16	Kokkolan Hermes	Mestis	40	6	11	17	8	7	1	0	1	0
2016–17	SaiPa	Jr. A	8	4	4	8	2	—	—	—	—	—
2016–17	SaiPa	Liiga	28	1	2	3	2	—	—	—	—	—
2016–17	Imatran Ketterä	Suomi-sarja	2	1	3	4	0	6	1	3	4	2
2017–18	Imatran Ketterä	Finland-Jr.2	1	1	0	1	0	—	—	—	—	—
2017–18	Imatran Ketterä	Mestis	46	30	31	61	32	4	2	1	3	22
2018–19	Mikkelin Jukurit	Liiga	4	0	1	1	2	—	—	—	—	—
2018–19	Imatran Ketterä	Mestis	41	15	16	31	20	14	9	8	17	4
2019–20	HC '05 Banská Bystrica	Slovak	53	23	23	46	12	—	—	—	—	—
2020–21	BK Mladá Boleslav	Czech	52	11	15	26	12	11	3	2	5	2
2021–22	HC Slovan Bratislava	Slovak	45	14	18	32	18	15	5	4	9	6
2022–23	HC Košice	Slovak	47	22	23	45	16	17	2	7	9	8
Liiga totals			32	1	3	4	2	—	—	—	—	—
Czech totals			52	11	35	26	12	11	3	2	5	2
Slovak totals			197	70	79	149	58	43	10	13	23	16

== Awards and honors ==
Award	Year
Slovak
Champion	2022, 2023
