= 2016–17 Mestis season =

2016–17 Mestis
- League: Mestis
- Sport: Ice hockey
- Duration: September 2016 – March 2017
- Number of teams: 13

Regular season
- Best record: SaPKo
- Runners-up: TuTo
- Top scorer: Jonatan Tanus
- Relegated to Suomi-sarja: JYP-Akatemia

Playoffs
- Playoffs MVP: Teemu Lepaus
- Finals champions: SaPKo
- Runners-up: Kiekko-Vantaa

Mestis seasons
- ← 2015–16 2017–18 →

The 2016–17 Mestis season was the 17th season of Mestis, the second highest level of ice hockey in Finland after Liiga. Previous season's champion Jukurit got a place in the Liiga. IPK got promoted from Suomi-sarja at the end of last season. Espoo United got a place in Mestis after Espoo Blues suffered bankruptcy and the league was exceptionally played with 13 teams.

At the end of the season SaPKo won both the regular season and the playoffs. Hokki and IPK retained their place in Mestis, while JYP-Akatemia was relegated. Hokki faced bankruptcy during the off-season and thus Imatran Ketterä were awarded a place in Mestis for the next season.

== Clubs ==
Team	City	Home arena, capacity	Founded	Head coach
Espoo United	Espoo	Espoo Metro Areena, 6,982	2016	(Finland) Timo Hirvonen
Hermes	Kokkola	Kokkolan jäähalli, 4,200	1953	(Finland) Antti Karhula
Hokki	Kajaani	Kajaanin Jäähalli, -	1968	(Finland) Jari Laukkanen
Iisalmen Peli-Karhut	Iisalmi	Kankaan jäähalli, -	1966	(Finland) ~~Jukka Niiranen~~17.1.2017 (Finland) Janne Sinkkonen
Jokipojat	Joensuu	Mehtimäki Ice Hall, 4,800	1953	(Finland) ~~Ari Aaltonen~~20.2.2017 (Finland) Jouni
JYP-Akatemia	Jyväskylä	Synergia Areena, 4,618	2008	(Finland) Jukka Ahvenjärvi
KeuPa HT	Keuruu	Keuruun Jäähalli, 1,100	1995	(Finland) Mikko Heiskanen
Kiekko-Vantaa	Vantaa	Trio Areena, 3,700	1994	(Finland) Simo Mälkiä
LeKi	Lempäälä	Masku Areena, 800	1904	(Finland) Miikka Kuusela
Peliitat	Heinola	Versowood Areena, 2,975	1984	(Finland) Marko Tuomainen
Rovaniemen Kiekko	Rovaniemi	Lappi Areena, 3,500	1979	(Finland) ~~Petteri Hirvonen~~13.2.2017 (Finland) Juha Juujärvi
SaPKo	Savonlinna	Talvisalo ice rink, 2,833	1929	(Finland) Pasi Räsänen
Tuto	Turku	Marli Areena, 3,000	1929	(Finland) Miika Elomo

== Regular season ==
Top eight advance to the Mestis playoffs while the bottom two face the top two teams from Suomi-sarja for a relegation playoff. Since the highest series of Finnish hockey is a closed series no team will be promoted to Liiga.

Pos	Team	Pld	W	OTW	OTL	L	GF	GA	GD	Pts	Final Result
1	SaPKo	50	32	5	2	11	181	110	+71	108	Advance to playoffs
2	Tuto	50	28	3	2	17	167	114	+53	92	Advance to playoffs
3	Kiekko-Vantaa	50	22	4	9	15	148	139	+9	83	Advance to playoffs
4	Hermes	50	22	5	4	19	160	139	+21	80	Advance to playoffs
5	Espoo United	50	20	5	7	18	132	138	−6	77	Advance to playoffs
6	Jokipojat	50	18	5	8	19	136	143	−7	72	Advance to playoffs
7	Peliitat	50	19	5	5	21	152	164	−12	72	Advance to playoffs
8	KeuPa HT	50	19	6	3	22	144	156	−12	72	Advance to playoffs
9	LeKi	50	20	3	2	25	143	155	−12	68	
10	RoKi	50	16	7	3	24	148	154	−6	65	
11	Hokki	50	15	6	8	21	116	135	−19	65	Qualification to the relegation playoffs
12	JYP-Akatemia	50	18	4	3	25	129	161	−32	65	Qualification to the relegation playoffs
13	Iisalmen Peli-Karhut	50	16	2	4	28	114	162	−48	56	Qualification to the relegation playoffs

Source: Tilastopalvelu.fi

Rules for classification: 1) Points; 2) Goal difference; 3) Goals scored; 4) Head-to-head points; 5) Penalty minutes.

== Playoffs ==
Playoffs are being played in three stages. Each stage is a best-of-7 series. The teams are reseeded after the quarterfinals, so that the best team by regular season performance to make the semifinals faces the worst team in the semifinals.

=== Bracket ===
Quarterfinals
1	SaPKo	4
8	KeuPa HT	0
4	Hermes	2
5	Espoo United	4
2	Kiekko-Vantaa	4
7	Jokipojat	0
3	Tuto	4
6	Peliitat	0

Semifinals
1	SaPKo	4
5	Espoo United	0
2	TuTo	2
3	Kiekko-Vantaa	4

Finals
1	SaPKo	4
3	Kiekko-Vantaa	0
Third place
2	TuTo	0
5	Espoo United	1

== Relegation qualification ==
Bottom three teams of Mestis face the top two teams of Suomi-Sarja in a relegation qualification, where two top teams will get a place in Mestis for the next season. Each team will play against each other twice.

Pos	Team	Pld	W	OTW	OTL	L	GF	GA	GD	Pts	Final Result
1	Hokki	8	6	0	0	2	33	15	+18	18	Play in Mestis for 2017–18 season
2	Iisalmen Peli-Karhut	11	5	1	1	4	26	16	+10	18	Play in Mestis for 2017–18 season
3	Ketterä	8	4	0	0	4	28	24	+4	12	Play in Suomi-sarja for 2017–18 season
4	JYP-Akatemia	8	3	0	1	4	19	22	−3	10	Play in Suomi-sarja for 2017–18 season
5	JHT	8	0	1	0	7	14	43	−29	2	Play in Suomi-sarja for 2017–18 season

Source: Tilastopalvelu.fi

Rules for classification: 1) Points; 2) Goal difference; 3) Goals scored; 4) Head-to-head points; 5) Penalty minutes.

== See also ==
2016–17 Liiga season
