= Roberts Locāns =

Latvian ice hockey right winger

- Born: 3 March 1996 (age 30) Riga, Latvia
- Height: 6 ft 4 in (193 cm)
- Weight: 209 lb (95 kg; 14 st 13 lb)
- Position: Right wing
- Shot: Right
- Played for: Dinamo Riga; Norfolk Admirals
- NHL draft: Undrafted
- Playing career: 2015–2019

Roberts Locāns (born 3 March 1996) is a Latvian professional ice hockey right winger. He is currently a free agent and last played for the Knoxville Ice Bears of the SPHL.

== Playing career ==
Locāns played 19 games for Dinamo Riga during the 2015–16 KHL season, registering two assists.

== Career statistics ==
=== Regular season and playoffs ===
			Regular season					Playoffs
Season	Team	League	GP	G	A	Pts	PIM	GP	G	A	Pts	PIM
2010–11	HS Prizma/Pardaugava U18	Latvia U18	3	0	1	1	2	—	—	—	—	—
2011–12	HK Prizma Riga	Latvia	1	0	0	0	2	—	—	—	—	—
2011–12	HS Prizma/Pardaugava U18	Latvia U18	12	12	13	25	2	—	—	—	—	—
2011–12	Prizma/Pardaugava U15	Latvia U16	15	51	35	86	14	—	—	—	—	—
2011–12	AIK J18	J18 Allsvenskan	1	0	0	0	0	—	—	—	—	—
2012–13	AIK J18	J18 Allsvenskan	18	2	2	4	10	2	0	0	0	0
2013–14	AIK J18	J18 Elit	21	12	10	22	20	—	—	—	—	—
2013–14	AIK J18	J18 Allsvenskan	14	6	6	12	18	—	—	—	—	—
2013–14	AIK J20	J20 SuperElit	3	0	0	0	2	—	—	—	—	—
2014–15	BIK Karlskoga J20	J20 Div.1	5	8	4	12	6	—	—	—	—	—
2014–15	BIK Karlskoga J20	J20 Elit	6	4	6	10	2	—	—	—	—	—
2014–15	Viking HC	Division 2	15	14	7	21	10	—	—	—	—	—
2015–16	Dinamo Riga	KHL	19	0	2	2	2	—	—	—	—	—
2015–16	HK Riga	MHL	25	8	11	19	10	—	—	—	—	—
2016–17	KeuPa HT	Mestis	24	7	4	11	18	—	—	—	—	—
2016–17	IPK	Mestis	19	5	5	10	12	—	—	—	—	—
2017–18	Hokki	Suomi-sarja	39	15	22	37	71	3	1	1	2	0
2018–19	Norfolk Admirals	ECHL	12	0	0	0	9	—	—	—	—	—
2018–19	Roanoke Rail Yard Dawgs	SPHL	4	0	0	0	0	—	—	—	—	—
2018–19	Knoxville Ice Bears	SPHL	16	8	6	14	11	—	—	—	—	—
KHL totals			19	0	2	2	2	—	—	—	—	—
ECHL totals			12	0	0	0	9	—	—	—	—	—

=== International ===
Year	Team	Event	GP	G	A	Pts	PIM
2014	Latvia U18	WJC-18 (D1)	5	4	1	5	4
2015	Latvia U20	WJC-20 (D1)	5	3	1	4	0
Junior totals			10	7	2	9	4
