= February 3 =

February 3 this year in various calendars
- Tuesday, 3 February 2026
Akan	Monobene
Armenian	18 Mehekani 1475
Aztec	Etzalcualiztli 4, 12 Malīnalli
Babylonian	14 Tebetu, 2336 SE
Balinese pawukon	Menga, Kajeng, Menala, Umanis, Maulu, Anggara of Uye, Yama, Gigis, Dewa
Bengali	20 Magh, BS 1432
Chinese	Yang Earth Monkey・Wings Mansion; Wood Snake Year, Month 12, Day 16 (Dahan, 1 day until Lichun)
Common Era	3 February 2026 CE
Coptic	26 Tobi, AM 1742
Egyptian	23 Payni, 2774 NE
Ethiopian	26 Ṭer, 2018 Amätä Məhrät
French Republican	Décade II, Quintidi de Pluviôse de l'Année 234 de la République
Gregorian	3 February, AD 2026
Hebrew	16 Shevat, AM 5786
Hindu	Maghā・Saubhāgya; Solar: 21 Māgha, 1947 SE; Lunisolar: Dvitīyā, Kṛishna pakṣa of Māgha, 2082 VE; Siddhārthin・5126 KY・1,872,609
Icelandic	Þriðjudagur, 12 Þorri 2025
Islamic	15 Sha'aban, AH 1447 (using tabular method)
ISO week date	2026-W06-2
Japanese	16 Shiwasu, Reiwa 8 (Daikan, 1 day until Risshun)
Julian	21 January, AD 2026 (AM 7534)
Julian day	2461075
Korean	16 Sodal, 4358 DE
Maya	13.0.13.5.12; 10 Pax, 12 Eb
Roman	ante diem XII Kalendas Februarias, MMDCCLXXIX AUC
Solar Hijri	14 Bahman, SH 1404
Tibetan	17 rgyal, shing mo sbrul 2152 or 1771 or 999

<<	February					>>
Su	Mo	Tu	We	Th	Fr	Sa
1	2	3	4	5	6	7
8	9	10	11	12	13	14
15	16	17	18	19	20	21
22	23	24	25	26	27	28
2026

February 3 in recent years
2026 (Tuesday)
2025 (Monday)
2024 (Saturday)
2023 (Friday)
2022 (Thursday)
2021 (Wednesday)
2020 (Monday)
2019 (Sunday)
2018 (Saturday)
2017 (Friday)

February 3 is the 34th day of the year in the Gregorian calendar; 331 days remain until the end of the year (332 in leap years).

== Events ==
=== Pre-1600 ===
- 1047 – Drogo of Hauteville is elected as count of the Apulian Normans during the Norman conquest of Southern Italy.
- 1112 – Ramon Berenguer III, Count of Barcelona, and Douce I, Countess of Provence, marry, uniting the fortunes of those two states.
- 1451 – Sultan Mehmed II inherits the throne of the Ottoman Empire.
- 1488 – Bartolomeu Dias of Portugal lands in Mossel Bay after rounding the Cape of Good Hope, becoming the first known European to travel so far south.
- 1509 – The Portuguese navy defeats a joint fleet of the Ottoman Empire, the Republic of Venice, the Sultan of Gujarat, the Mamlûk Burji Sultanate of Egypt, the Zamorin of Calicut, and the Republic of Ragusa at the Battle of Diu in Diu, India.
- 1583 – Battle of São Vicente takes place off Portuguese Brazil where three English warships led by navigator Edward Fenton fight off three Spanish galleons sinking one in the process.

=== 1601–1900 ===
- 1637 – Tulip Mania collapses within the Dutch Republic.
- 1639 – The House of Assembly of Barbados meets for the first time.
- 1690 – The colony of Massachusetts issues the first paper money in the Americas.
- 1706 – During the Battle of Fraustadt Swedish forces defeat a superior Saxon-Polish-Russian force by deploying a double envelopment.
- 1716 – The 1716 Algiers earthquake sequence began with an M_{w} 7.0 mainshock that caused severe damage and killed 20,000 in Algeria.
- 1781 – American Revolutionary War: British forces seize the Dutch-owned Caribbean island Sint Eustatius.
- 1783 – Spain–United States relations are first established.
- 1787 – Militia led by General Benjamin Lincoln crush the remnants of Shays' Rebellion in Petersham, Massachusetts.
- 1807 – A British military force, under Brigadier-General Sir Samuel Auchmuty captures the Spanish Empire city of Montevideo, now the capital of Uruguay.
- 1809 – The Territory of Illinois is created by the 10th United States Congress.
- 1813 – José de San Martín defeats a Spanish royalist army at the Battle of San Lorenzo, part of the Argentine War of Independence.
- 1830 – The London Protocol of 1830 establishes the full independence and sovereignty of Greece from the Ottoman Empire as the final result of the Greek War of Independence.
- 1862 – Moldavia and Wallachia formally unite to create the Romanian United Principalities.
- 1865 -- The Hampton Roads Conference occurs between representatives of the United States and Confederate States to discuss terms to end the American Civil War.
- 1870 – The Fifteenth Amendment to the United States Constitution is ratified, guaranteeing voting rights to male citizens regardless of race.

=== 1901–present ===
- 1913 – The Sixteenth Amendment to the United States Constitution is ratified, authorizing the Federal government to impose and collect an income tax.
- 1916 – The Centre Block of the Parliament buildings in Ottawa, Ontario, Canada burns down with the loss of seven lives.
- 1917 – World War I: The American entry into World War I begins when diplomatic relations with Germany are severed due to its unrestricted submarine warfare.
- 1918 – The Twin Peaks Tunnel in San Francisco, California begins service as the longest streetcar tunnel in the world at 11,920 feet (3,630 meters) long.
- 1927 – A revolt against the military dictatorship of Portugal breaks out at Porto.
- 1930 – The Communist Party of Vietnam is founded at a "Unification Conference" held in Kowloon, British Hong Kong.
- 1931 – The Hawke's Bay earthquake, New Zealand's worst natural disaster, kills 258.
- 1933 – Adolf Hitler announces that the expansion of Lebensraum into Eastern Europe, and its ruthless Germanisation, are the ultimate geopolitical objectives of Nazi foreign policy.
- 1943 – The SS Dorchester is sunk by a German U-boat. Only 230 of 902 men aboard survive.
- 1944 – World War II: During the Gilbert and Marshall Islands campaign, U.S. Army and Marine forces seize Kwajalein Atoll from the defending Japanese garrison.
- 1945 – World War II: As part of Operation Thunderclap, 1,000 B-17s of the Eighth Air Force bomb Berlin, a raid which kills between 2,500 and 3,000 and dehouses another 120,000.
- 1945 – World War II: The United States and the Philippine Commonwealth begin a month-long battle to retake Manila from Japan.
- 1953 – The Batepá massacre occurs in São Tomé when the colonial administration and Portuguese landowners unleash a wave of violence against the native creoles known as forros.
- 1958 – Founding of the Benelux Economic Union, creating a testing ground for a later European Economic Community.
- 1959 – Rock and roll musicians Buddy Holly, Ritchie Valens, and J. P. "The Big Bopper" Richardson are killed in a plane crash along with the pilot near Clear Lake, Iowa, an event later known as The Day the Music Died.
- 1959 – Sixty-five people are killed when American Airlines Flight 320 crashes into the East River on approach to LaGuardia Airport in New York City.
- 1960 – British Prime Minister Harold Macmillan speaks of "a wind of change", signalling that his Government is likely to support decolonisation.
- 1961 – The United States Air Force begins Operation Looking Glass, and over the next 30 years, a "Doomsday Plane" is always in the air, with the capability of taking direct control of the United States' bombers and missiles in the event of the destruction of the SAC's command post.
- 1966 – The Soviet Union's Luna 9 becomes the first spacecraft to make a soft landing on the Moon, and the first spacecraft to take pictures from the surface of the Moon.
- 1971 – New York Police Officer Frank Serpico is shot during a drug bust in Brooklyn and survives to later testify against police corruption.
- 1972 – The first day of the seven-day 1972 Iran blizzard, which would kill at least 4,000 people, making it the deadliest snowstorm in history.
- 1984 – Doctor John Buster and a research team at Harbor-UCLA Medical Center in the United States announce history's first embryo transfer, from one woman to another resulting in a live birth.
- 1984 – Space Shuttle program: STS-41-B is launched using Space Shuttle Challenger.
- 1989 – After a stroke two weeks previously, South African President P. W. Botha resigns as leader of the National Party, but stays on as president for six more months.
- 1989 – A military coup overthrows Alfredo Stroessner, dictator of Paraguay since 1954.
- 1994 – Space Shuttle program: STS-60 is launched, carrying Sergei Krikalev, the first Russian cosmonaut to fly aboard the Shuttle.
- 1995 – Astronaut Eileen Collins becomes the first woman to pilot the Space Shuttle as mission STS-63 gets underway from Kennedy Space Center in Florida.
- 1998 – Cavalese cable car disaster: A United States military pilot causes the death of 20 people when his low-flying plane cuts the cable of a cable-car near Trento, Italy.
- 2005 – One hundred five people are killed when Kam Air Flight 904 crashes in the Pamir Mountains in Afghanistan.
- 2007 – A Baghdad market bombing kills at least 135 people and injures a further 339.
- 2014 – A school shooting in Moscow, Russia leaves two people dead and one wounded.
- 2023 – Ohio train derailment: A freight train containing vinyl chloride and other hazardous materials derails and burns in East Palestine, Ohio, United States, releasing hydrogen chloride and phosgene into the air and contaminating the Ohio River.
- 2026 – Islamist militants massacred at least 162 while injuring and kidnapping dozens in two villages in Kwara State, Nigeria.

== Births ==
=== Pre-1600 ===
- 1338 – Joanna of Bourbon (died 1378)
- 1393 – Henry Percy, 2nd Earl of Northumberland, English nobleman and military commander (died 1455)
- 1428 – Helena Palaiologina, Queen of Cyprus (died 1458)
- 1478 – Edward Stafford, 3rd Duke of Buckingham (died 1521)
- 1504 – Scipione Rebiba, Italian cardinal (died 1577)

=== 1601–1900 ===
- 1677 – Jan Santini Aichel, Czech architect, designed the Karlova Koruna Chateau (died 1723)
- 1689 – Blas de Lezo, Spanish admiral (died 1741)
- 1721 – Friedrich Wilhelm von Seydlitz, Prussian general (died 1773)
- 1736 – Johann Georg Albrechtsberger, Austrian composer and theorist (died 1809)
- 1747 – Samuel Osgood, American soldier and politician, 1st United States Postmaster General (died 1813)
- 1757 – Joseph Forlenze, Italian ophthalmologist and surgeon (died 1833)
- 1763 – Caroline von Wolzogen, German author (died 1847)
- 1777 – John Cheyne, Scottish physician and author (died 1836)
- 1780 – Mihail G. Boiagi, Aromanian grammarian and professor (died uncertain)
- 1790 – Gideon Mantell, English scientist (died 1852)
- 1795 – Antonio José de Sucre, Venezuelan general and politician, 2nd President of Bolivia (died 1830)
- 1807 – Joseph E. Johnston, American general and politician (died 1891)
- 1809 – Felix Mendelssohn, German pianist, composer, and conductor (died 1847)
- 1811 – Horace Greeley, American journalist and politician (died 1872)
- 1816 – Ram Singh Kuka, Indian credited with starting the Non-cooperation movement
- 1815 – Edward James Roye, 5th President of Liberia (died 1872)
- 1817 – Achille Ernest Oscar Joseph Delesse, French geologist and mineralogist (died 1881)
- 1817 – Émile Prudent, French pianist and composer (died 1864)
- 1821 – Elizabeth Blackwell, American physician and educator (died 1910)
- 1824 – Ranald MacDonald, American explorer and educator (died 1894)
- 1826 – Walter Bagehot, English journalist and businessman (died 1877)
- 1830 – Robert Gascoyne-Cecil, 3rd Marquess of Salisbury, English politician, Prime Minister of the United Kingdom (died 1903)
- 1840 – Allan McLean, Scottish-Australian politician, 19th Premier of Victoria (died 1911)
- 1842 – Sidney Lanier, American composer and poet (died 1881)
- 1843 – William Cornelius Van Horne, American-Canadian businessman (died 1915)
- 1857 – Giuseppe Moretti, Italian sculptor, designed the Vulcan statue (died 1935)
- 1859 – Hugo Junkers, German engineer, designed the Junkers J 1 (died 1935)
- 1862 – James Clark McReynolds, American lawyer and judge (died 1946)
- 1867 – Charles Henry Turner, American biologist, educator and zoologist (died 1923)
- 1872 – Lou Criger, American baseball player and manager (died 1934)
- 1874 – Gertrude Stein, American novelist, poet, playwright, (died 1946)
- 1878 – Gordon Coates, New Zealand soldier and politician, 21st Prime Minister of New Zealand (died 1943)
- 1878 – Grigory Petrovsky, Ukrainian Soviet revolutionary and politician (died 1958)
- 1887 – Georg Trakl, Austrian pharmacist and poet (died 1914)
- 1889 – Artur Adson, Estonian poet, playwright, and critic (died 1977)
- 1889 – Carl Theodor Dreyer, Danish director and screenwriter (died 1968)
- 1889 – Risto Ryti, Finnish lawyer, politician and the Governor of the Bank of Finland; 5th President of Finland (died 1956)
- 1892 – Juan Negrín, Spanish physician and politician, 67th Prime Minister of Spain (died 1956)
- 1893 – Gaston Julia, Algerian-French mathematician and academic (died 1978)
- 1894 – Norman Rockwell, American painter and illustrator (died 1978)
- 1898 – Alvar Aalto, Finnish architect, designed the Finlandia Hall and Aalto Theatre (died 1976)
- 1899 – Café Filho, Brazilian journalist, lawyer, and politician, 18th President of Brazil (died 1970)
- 1900 – Mabel Mercer, English-American singer (died 1984)

=== 1901–present ===
- 1903 – Douglas Douglas-Hamilton, 14th Duke of Hamilton, Scottish soldier, pilot, and politician (died 1973)
- 1904 – Pretty Boy Floyd, American gangster (died 1934)
- 1905 – Paul Ariste, Estonian linguist and academic (died 1990)
- 1905 – Arne Beurling, Swedish-American mathematician and academic (died 1986)
- 1906 – George Adamson, Indian-English author and activist (died 1989)
- 1907 – James A. Michener, American author and philanthropist (died 1997)
- 1909 – André Cayatte, French lawyer and director (died 1989)
- 1909 – Simone Weil, French mystic and philosopher (died 1943)
- 1911 – Jehan Alain, French organist and composer (died 1940)
- 1912 – Jacques Soustelle, French anthropologist and politician (died 1990)
- 1914 – Mary Carlisle, American actress, singer, and dancer (died 2018)
- 1915 – Johannes Kotkas, Estonian wrestler and hammer thrower (died 1998)
- 1917 – Shlomo Goren, Polish-Israeli rabbi and general (died 1994)
- 1918 – Joey Bishop, American actor and producer (died 2007)
- 1918 – Helen Stephens, American runner, baseball player, and manager (died 1994)
- 1920 – Henry Heimlich, American physician and author (died 2016)
- 1924 – Martial Asselin, Canadian lawyer and politician, 25th Lieutenant Governor of Quebec (died 2013)
- 1924 – E. P. Thompson, English historian and author (died 1993)
- 1925 – Shelley Berman, American actor and comedian (died 2017)
- 1925 – John Fiedler, American actor (died 2005)
- 1926 – Hans-Jochen Vogel, German lawyer and politician, 8th Mayor of Berlin (died 2020)
- 1927 – Kenneth Anger, American actor, director, and screenwriter (died 2023)
- 1927 – Blas Ople, Filipino journalist and politician, 21st President of the Senate of the Philippines (died 2003)
- 1933 – Paul Sarbanes, American lawyer and politician (died 2020)
- 1934 – Juan Carlos Calabró, Argentinian actor and screenwriter (died 2013)
- 1935 – Johnny "Guitar" Watson, American blues, soul, and funk singer-songwriter and guitarist (died 1996)
- 1936 – Bob Simpson, Australian cricketer and coach (died 2025)
- 1937 – Billy Meier, Swiss author and photographer
- 1938 – Victor Buono, American actor (died 1982)
- 1938 – Emile Griffith, American boxer and trainer (died 2013)
- 1939 – Michael Cimino, American director, producer, and screenwriter (died 2016)
- 1940 – Fran Tarkenton, American football player and sportscaster
- 1941 – Dory Funk, Jr., American wrestler and trainer (died 2026)
- 1943 – Blythe Danner, American actress
- 1945 – Bob Griese, American football player and sportscaster
- 1947 – Paul Auster, American novelist, essayist, and poet (died 2024)
- 1947 – Dave Davies, English musician
- 1947 – Stephen McHattie, Canadian actor and director
- 1947 – Melanie, American singer-songwriter (died 2024)
- 1948 – Carlos Filipe Ximenes Belo, East Timorese Roman Catholic bishop and Nobel Peace Prize laureate
- 1948 – Henning Mankell, Swedish author and playwright (died 2015)
- 1950 – Morgan Fairchild, American actress
- 1950 – Pamela Franklin, Japanese-English actress
- 1950 – Grant Goldman, Australian radio and television host (died 2020)
- 1951 – Arsène Auguste, Haitian footballer (died 1993)
- 1951 – Eugenijus Riabovas, Lithuanian footballer and manager
- 1952 – Fred Lynn, American baseball player
- 1954 – Tiger Williams, Canadian ice hockey player and coach
- 1956 – Nathan Lane, American actor and comedian
- 1956 – Lee Ranaldo, American musician and songwriter
- 1957 – Eric Lander, American mathematician, geneticist, and academic
- 1958 – Joe F. Edwards, Jr., American commander, pilot, and astronaut
- 1958 – Greg Mankiw, American economist and academic
- 1959 – Thomas Calabro, American actor
- 1959 – Lol Tolhurst, English musician and songwriter
- 1959 – Óscar Iván Zuluaga, Colombian economist and politician, 67th Colombian Minister of Finance
- 1960 – Marty Jannetty, American wrestler
- 1960 – Joachim Löw, German footballer and manager
- 1962 – Michele Greene, American actress, singer, and author
- 1963 – Vũ Đức Đam, Vietnamese politician
- 1963 – Raghuram Rajan, Indian economist and academic
- 1964 – Indrek Tarand, Estonian historian, journalist, and politician
- 1965 – Manuel Loff, Portuguese politician
- 1965 – Maura Tierney, American actress and producer
- 1966 – Danny Morrison, New Zealand cricketer and sportscaster
- 1967 – Tim Flowers, English footballer and coach
- 1967 – Mixu Paatelainen, Finnish footballer and coach
- 1968 – Vlade Divac, Serbian-American basketball player and sportscaster
- 1968 – Marwan Khoury, Lebanese singer, songwriter, and composer
- 1968 – František Kučera, Czech ice hockey player
- 1969 – Beau Biden, American soldier, lawyer, and politician, 44th Attorney General of Delaware (died 2015)
- 1969 – Retief Goosen, South African golfer
- 1969 – Robert Pack, American basketball player and coach
- 1970 – Óscar Córdoba, Colombian footballer
- 1970 – Warwick Davis, English actor, producer, and screenwriter
- 1970 – Antony Russo, American director, producer and screenwriter
- 1970 – Keith Carney, American ice hockey player
- 1971 – Elisa Donovan, American actress
- 1971 – Sarah Kane, English playwright (died 1999)
- 1971 – Hong Seok-cheon, South Korean actor
- 1973 – Ilana Sod, Mexican journalist and producer
- 1974 – Ayanna Pressley, American politician
- 1976 – Mathieu Dandenault, Canadian ice hockey player
- 1976 – Isla Fisher, Omani-Australian actress
- 1976 – Tim Heidecker, American actor, comedian, and musician
- 1976 – Eihi Shiina, Japanese fashion model and actress
- 1977 – Maitland Ward, American actress and model
- 1977 – Daddy Yankee, Puerto Rican singer, songwriter, rapper, actor and record producer
- 1977 – Marek Židlický, Czech ice hockey player
- 1977 – Adia Barnes, American basketball player and coach
- 1978 – Joan Capdevila, Spanish footballer
- 1978 – Amal Clooney, British-Lebanese barrister and activist
- 1982 – Becky Bayless, American wrestler
- 1982 – Marie-Ève Drolet, Canadian speed skater
- 1982 – Bridget Regan, American actress
- 1984 – Elizabeth Holmes, American fraudster, founder of Theranos
- 1984 – Matthew Moy, American actor
- 1985 – Angela Fong, Canadian wrestler and actress
- 1985 – Andrei Kostitsyn, Belarusian ice hockey player
- 1986 – Mathieu Giroux, Canadian speed skater
- 1986 – Kanako Yanagihara, Japanese actress
- 1987 – Elvana Gjata, Albanian singer
- 1988 – Cho Kyu-hyun, South Korean singer
- 1989 – Jia, Chinese singer and actress
- 1989 – Slobodan Rajković, Serbian footballer
- 1990 – Sean Kingston, American-Jamaican singer-songwriter
- 1992 – Olli Aitola, Finnish ice hockey player
- 1992 – James White, American football player
- 1993 – Adam Reach, English footballer
- 1994 – Rougned Odor, Venezuelan baseball player
- 1995 – Tao Tsuchiya, Japanese actress
- 1998 – Tyler Huntley, American football player
- 1998 – Isaiah Roby, American basketball player
- 1998 – Aurélien Giraud, French skateboarder
- 1999 – Kanna Hashimoto, Japanese actress
- 2001 – Tre Mann, American basketball player
- 2001 – Rhys Williams, English footballer
- 2004 – Rei, Japanese rapper and singer
- 2004 – Scoot Henderson, American basketball player

== Deaths ==
=== Pre-1600 ===
- 6 – Ping, emperor of the Han Dynasty (born 9 BC)
- 456 – Sihyaj Chan K'awiil II, ruler of Tikal
- 639 – K'inich Yo'nal Ahk I, ruler of Piedras Negras
- 699 – Werburgh, English nun and saint
- 865 – Ansgar, Frankish archbishop (born 801)
- 929 – Guy, margrave of Tuscany
- 938 – Zhou Ben, Chinese general (born 862)
- 994 – William IV, duke of Aquitaine (born 937)
- 1014 – Sweyn Forkbeard, king of Denmark and England (born 960)
- 1116 – Coloman, king of Hungary
- 1161 – Inge I, king of Norway (born 1135)
- 1252 – Sviatoslav III, Russian Grand Prince (born 1196)
- 1399 – John of Gaunt, Belgian-English politician, Lord High Steward (born 1340)
- 1428 – Ashikaga Yoshimochi, Japanese shōgun (born 1386)
- 1451 – Murad II, Ottoman sultan (born 1404)
- 1468 – Johannes Gutenberg, German publisher, invented the printing press (born 1398)
- 1475 – John IV, Count of Nassau-Siegen, German count (born 1410)
- 1537 – Thomas FitzGerald, 10th Earl of Kildare (born 1513)
- 1566 – George Cassander, Flemish theologian and author (born 1513)

=== 1601–1900 ===
- 1618 – Philip II, duke of Pomerania (born 1573)
- 1619 – Henry Brooke, 11th Baron Cobham, English politician, Lord Warden of the Cinque Ports (born 1564)
- 1737 – Tommaso Ceva, Italian mathematician and academic (born 1648)
- 1802 – Pedro Rodríguez, Spanish statesman and economist (born 1723)
- 1813 – Juan Bautista Cabral, Argentinian sergeant (born 1789)
- 1820 – Gia Long, Vietnamese emperor (born 1762)
- 1832 – George Crabbe, English surgeon and poet (born 1754)
- 1862 – Jean-Baptiste Biot, French physicist, astronomer, and mathematician (born 1774)
- 1866 – François-Xavier Garneau, Canadian poet, author, and historian (born 1809)
- 1873 – Isaac Baker Brown, English gynecologist and surgeon (born 1811)
- 1899 – Geert Adriaans Boomgaard, Dutch supercentenarian (born 1788)

=== 1901–present ===
- 1922 – Christiaan de Wet, South African general and politician, State President of the Orange Free State (born 1854)
- 1922 – John Butler Yeats, Irish painter and illustrator (born 1839)
- 1924 – Woodrow Wilson, American historian, academic, and politician, 28th President of the United States, Nobel Prize laureate (born 1856)
- 1929 – Agner Krarup Erlang, Danish mathematician and engineer (born 1878)
- 1935 – Hugo Junkers, German engineer, designed the Junkers J 1 (born 1859)
- 1944 – Yvette Guilbert, French singer and actress (born 1865)
- 1945 – Roland Freisler, German lawyer and judge (born 1893)
- 1947 – Marc Mitscher, American admiral and pilot (born 1887)
- 1952 – Harold L. Ickes, American journalist and politician, 32nd United States Secretary of the Interior (born 1874)
- 1955 – Vasily Blokhin, Russian general (born 1895)
- 1956 – Émile Borel, French mathematician and academic (born 1871)
- 1956 – Johnny Claes, English-Belgian race car driver and trumpet player (born 1916)
- 1959 – The Day the Music Died
  - The Big Bopper, American singer-songwriter and guitarist (born 1930)
  - Buddy Holly, American singer-songwriter and guitarist (born 1936)
  - Ritchie Valens, American singer-songwriter and guitarist (born 1941)
- 1960 – Fred Buscaglione, Italian singer and actor (born 1921)
- 1961 – William Morrison, 1st Viscount Dunrossil, Scottish-Australian captain and politician, 14th Governor-General of Australia (born 1893)
- 1961 – Anna May Wong, American actress (born 1905)
- 1963 – Benjamin R. Jacobs, American biochemist (born 1879)
- 1967 – Joe Meek, English songwriter and producer (born 1929)
- 1969 – C. N. Annadurai, Indian journalist and politician, 7th Chief Minister of Madras State (born 1909)
- 1969 – Eduardo Mondlane, Mozambican activist and academic (born 1920)
- 1975 – William D. Coolidge, American physicist and engineer (born 1873)
- 1975 – Umm Kulthum, Egyptian singer-songwriter and actress (born 1904)
- 1985 – Frank Oppenheimer, American physicist and academic (born 1912)
- 1989 – John Cassavetes, American actor, director, and screenwriter (born 1929)
- 1989 – Lionel Newman, American pianist, composer, and conductor (born 1916)
- 1991 – Nancy Kulp, American actress (born 1921)
- 1993 – Françoys Bernier, Canadian pianist and conductor (born 1927)
- 1996 – Audrey Meadows, American actress and banker (born 1922)
- 1999 – Gwen Guthrie, American singer-songwriter and pianist (born 1950)
- 2004 – Mrs. Ngô Bá Thành, Vietnamese lawyer, politician, and activist (born 1931)
- 2005 – Zurab Zhvania, Georgian biologist and politician, 4th Prime Minister of Georgia (born 1963)
- 2005 – Ernst Mayr, German-American biologist and ornithologist (born 1904)
- 2006 – Al Lewis, American actor and activist (born 1923)
- 2009 – Sheng-yen, Chinese monk and scholar, founded the Dharma Drum Mountain (born 1930)
- 2010 – Dick McGuire, American basketball player and coach (born 1926)
- 2010 – Frances Reid, American actress (born 1914)
- 2011 – Maria Schneider, French actress (born 1952)
- 2012 – Toh Chin Chye, Singaporean academic and politician, 1st Deputy Prime Minister of Singapore (born 1921)
- 2012 – Ben Gazzara, American actor and director (born 1930)
- 2012 – Terence Hildner, American general (born 1962)
- 2012 – Raj Kanwar, Indian director, producer, and screenwriter (born 1961)
- 2012 – Zalman King, American actor, director, and producer (born 1942)
- 2012 – Andrzej Szczeklik, Polish physician and academic (born 1938)
- 2013 – Cardiss Collins, American politician (born 1931)
- 2013 – Oscar Feltsman, Ukrainian-Russian composer and producer (born 1921)
- 2013 – James Muri, American soldier and pilot (born 1918)
- 2013 – Jam Mohammad Yousaf, Pakistani politician, Chief Minister of Balochistan (born 1954)
- 2015 – Martin Gilbert, English historian, author, and academic (born 1936)
- 2015 – Mary Healy, American actress and singer (born 1918)
- 2015 – Charlie Sifford, American golfer (born 1922)
- 2015 – Nasim Hasan Shah, Pakistani lawyer and judge, 12th Chief Justice of Pakistan (born 1929)
- 2016 – Joe Alaskey, American actor (born 1952)
- 2016 – Balram Jakhar, Indian lawyer and politician, 23rd Governor of Madhya Pradesh (born 1923)
- 2016 – József Kasza, Serbian politician and economist (born 1945)
- 2017 – Dritëro Agolli, Albanian poet, writer and politician (born 1931)
- 2019 – Julie Adams, American actress (born 1926)
- 2019 – Kristoff St. John, American actor (born 1966)
- 2020 – George Steiner, French-American philosopher, author, and critic (born 1929)
- 2025 – Harry Jayawardena, Sri Lankan industrialist (born 1942)
- 2025 – Kandiah Balendra, Sri Lankan corporate leader and executive (born 1940)

== Holidays and observances ==
- Christian feast day:
  - Aaron the Illustrious (Syriac Orthodox Church)
  - Ansgar
  - Berlinda of Meerbeke
  - Blaise
  - Celsa and Nona
  - Claudine Thévenet
  - Dom Justo Takayama (Philippines and Japan)
  - Hadelin
  - Margaret of England
  - Werburgh
  - February 3 (Eastern Orthodox liturgics)
- Day of the Virgin of Suyapa (Honduras)
- Earliest day on which Shrove Tuesday can fall, while March 9 is the latest; celebrated on Tuesday before Ash Wednesday (Christianity)
- Four Chaplains Day (United States, also considered a Feast Day by the Episcopal Church)
- Communist Party of Vietnam Foundation Anniversary (Vietnam)
- Day of Finnish architecture and design, birthday of Alvar Aalto (Finland)
- Heroes' Day (Mozambique)
- Martyrs' Day (São Tomé and Príncipe)
- Setsubun (Japan)
- Veterans' Day (Thailand)
