= Jesse Rantamäki =

Finnish ice hockey player

- Born: 12 August 1996 (age 28); Seinäjoki, Finland
- Height: 6 ft 0 in (183 cm)
- Weight: 203 lb (92 kg; 14 st 7 lb)
- Position: Forward
- Shot: Right
- Played for: Vaasan Sport
- NHL draft: Undrafted
- Playing career: 2015–2018

Jesse Rantamäki (born 12 August 1996) is a Finnish former ice hockey player. He played with Vaasan Sport in the Finnish Liiga.

Rantamäki made his Liiga debut playing with Vaasan Sport during the 2014–15 season.

== Career statistics ==
			Regular season					Playoffs
Season	Team	League	GP	G	A	Pts	PIM	GP	G	A	Pts	PIM
2011–12	Kiekko-Vantaa U16	U16 I-divisioona	13	5	20	25	16	—	—	—	—	—
2012–13	Kiekko-Vantaa U18	U18 Mestis	38	16	43	59	14	—	—	—	—	—
2013–14	Vaasan Sport U18	U18 Mestis	27	15	20	35	38	—	—	—	—	—
2013–14	Vaasan Sport U18	U18 SM-sarja	17	5	11	16	35	—	—	—	—	—
2014–15	Vaasan Sport U20	U20 SM-liiga	39	11	14	25	12	—	—	—	—	—
2014–15	Vaasan Sport	Liiga	7	0	0	0	4	—	—	—	—	—
2015–16	Vaasan Sport U20	U20 SM-liiga	14	2	4	6	2	—	—	—	—	—
2016–17	Vaasan Sport U20	U20 SM-liiga	25	4	9	13	22	—	—	—	—	—
2016–17	Vaasan Sport	Liiga	8	0	0	0	2	—	—	—	—	—
2016–17	Kokkolan Hermes	Mestis	7	0	0	0	0	—	—	—	—	—
2017–18	Vaasan Sport U20	U20 SM-liiga	15	2	5	7	6	—	—	—	—	—
2017–18	Vaasan Sport	Liiga	7	0	0	0	0	—	—	—	—	—
Liiga totals			22	0	0	0	6	—	—	—	—	—
Mestis totals			7	0	0	0	0	—	—	—	—	—
