= Nättinen =

Surname list

Nättinen is the surname of the following people

- Joonas Nättinen (born 1991), Finnish ice hockey player
- Julius Nättinen (born 1997), Finnish ice hockey player
- Jussi Nättinen (born 1987), Finnish ice hockey player
- Topi Nättinen (born 1994), Finnish ice hockey player
