= Pihlajamäki (surname) =

Pihlajamäki is a Finnish surname that may refer to

- Hermanni Pihlajamäki (1903–1982), Finnish wrestler
- Kustaa Pihlajamäki (1902–1944), Finnish wrestler, cousin of Hermanni
- Valtteri Pihlajamäki (born 1996), Finnish professional ice hockey right winger
