= Perttu Hynönen =

Finnish ice hockey player

- Born: September 16, 1994 (age 30); Sotkamo, Finland
- Height: 6 ft 0 in (183 cm)
- Weight: 183 lb (83 kg; 13 st 1 lb)
- Position: Defence
- Shoots: Left
- Mestis team Former teams: Peliitat Heinola; Lahti Pelicans
- NHL draft: Undrafted
- Playing career: 2015–present

Perttu Hynönen (born September 16, 1994) is a Finnish ice hockey defenceman. He is currently playing with Peliitat Heinola in the Finnish Mestis.

Hynönen made his Liiga debut playing with Lahti Pelicans during the 2014–15 Liiga season.
