= Oula Palve =

Finnish ice hockey player

- Born: 19 February 1992 (age 34) Keuruu, Finland
- Height: 6 ft 0 in (183 cm)
- Weight: 176 lb (80 kg; 12 st 8 lb)
- Position: Centre
- Shoots: Left
- Liiga team Former teams: Vaasan Sport; JYP Jyväskylä; Jukurit; HPK; TPS; Wilkes-Barre/Scranton Penguins; Texas Stars; Linköping HC; Brynäs IF; Ilves; HC Ajoie; Genève-Servette HC; EHC Kloten; Djurgården IF
- NHL draft: Undrafted
- Playing career: 2011–present

Oula Palve (born 19 February 1992) is a Finnish professional ice hockey forward currently playing for Vaasan Sport of the Finnish Liiga.

Undrafted, Palve made his SM-liiga debut playing with JYP Jyväskylä during the 2012–13 SM-liiga season.

In the 2018–19 season, Palve established a new career bests in the Liiga with 16 goals and 51 points in 53 games for TPS.

On 22 April 2019, Palve signed a one-year, entry-level contract with the Pittsburgh Penguins of the NHL. The deal will carry an NHL salary of $700K (the league minimum) as well as a maximum $92.5K signing bonus and games played incentives of up to $132.5K.

After attending his first training camp with the Penguins, Palve was assigned to begin the 2019–20 season in the AHL with affiliate, the Wilkes-Barre/Scranton Penguins. Palve struggled to find his offensive game with Wilkes-Barre, posting just 1 goal and 8 points in 37 games. On 17 January 2020, Palve was traded mid-season by the Penguins to the Dallas Stars in exchange for John Nyberg. He was assigned to the Stars' AHL affiliate and namesake, the Texas Stars, for the remainder of the season.

With his lone season in North America complete due to the cancellation of the season with COVID-19, Palve opted to return to Europe in agreeing to a two-year contract with Swedish club, Linköping HC of the SHL, on 28 April 2020.

== Personal life ==
In 2021, Palve became engaged to former The Bachelor contestant Haley Ferguson. They married on June 11, 2022. They have a daughter, born on April 27, 2024.

== Career statistics ==
			Regular season					Playoffs
Season	Team	League	GP	G	A	Pts	PIM	GP	G	A	Pts	PIM
2009–10	JYP Jyväskylä	Jr. A	14	0	2	2	6	—	—	—	—	—
2010–11	JYP Jyväskylä	Jr. A	32	18	22	40	36	9	4	9	13	8
2010–11	D Team	Mestis	13	1	0	1	0	—	—	—	—	—
2011–12	JYP Jyväskylä	Jr. A	3	0	2	2	2	—	—	—	—	—
2011–12	JYP-Akatemia	Mestis	44	12	7	19	8	—	—	—	—	—
2012–13	JYP Jyväskylä	Jr. A	6	4	1	5	6	6	3	3	6	16
2012–13	JYP Jyväskylä	SM-l	3	0	0	0	0	—	—	—	—	—
2012–13	JYP-Akatemia	Mestis	40	13	23	36	24	—	—	—	—	—
2013–14	JYP-Akatemia	Mestis	43	10	17	27	24	—	—	—	—	—
2013–14	JYP Jyväskylä	Liiga	1	0	0	0	0	—	—	—	—	—
2013–14	Jukurit	Mestis	7	2	3	5	2	19	1	9	10	6
2014–15	Jukurit	Mestis	49	20	32	52	12	13	4	7	11	14
2015–16	Jukurit	Mestis	43	32	39	71	22	16	6	8	14	4
2016–17	HPK	Liiga	53	5	17	22	28	7	0	2	2	8
2017–18	HPK	Liiga	50	13	31	44	65	—	—	—	—	—
2017–18	TPS	Liiga	5	1	5	6	2	11	4	8	12	6
2018–19	TPS	Liiga	53	16	35	51	79	5	1	3	4	2
2019–20	Wilkes-Barre/Scranton Penguins	AHL	37	1	7	8	22	—	—	—	—	—
2019–20	Texas Stars	AHL	23	2	3	5	23	—	—	—	—	—
2020–21	Linköping HC	SHL	31	3	9	12	22	—	—	—	—	—
2020–21	Brynäs IF	SHL	25	7	7	14	12	—	—	—	—	—
2021–22	Brynäs IF	SHL	50	11	24	35	18	3	0	1	1	4
2022–23	Brynäs IF	SHL	51	7	12	19	16	—	—	—	—	—
2023–24	Ilves	Liiga	60	20	44	64	63	5	0	2	2	2
Liiga totals			225	55	132	187	237	28	5	15	20	18
SHL totals			157	28	52	80	68	3	0	1	1	4

== Awards and honours ==
Award	Year
Mestis
Champion (Jukurit)	2015, 2016
Best Forward	2016
First All-Star Team	2016
Golden Puck	2016
