= Pasi Kouvalainen =

Finnish ice hockey player

- Born: January 6, 1992 (age 33); Pyhäjärvi, Finland
- Height: 5 ft 11 in (180 cm)
- Weight: 174 lb (79 kg; 12 st 6 lb)
- Position: Forward
- Shoots: Right
- Mestis team Former teams: Peliitat Heinola; KalPa; Pelicans
- Playing career: 2012–present

Pasi Kouvalainen (born January 6, 1992) is a Finnish ice hockey player. He is currently playing with Peliitat Heinola in the Finnish Mestis.

Kouvalainen made his SM-liiga debut playing with KalPa during the 2012–13 SM-liiga season.
