= Porvoo Hunters =

- City: Porvoo, Finland
- League: Suomi-sarja
- Founded: 1997
- Home arena: Porvoon jäähalli (capacity 1,000)
- Colours
- General manager: Markku Välimäki
- Head coach: Tommy Grönlund
- Captain: Juho Rantanen
- Website: porvoohunters.fi

The Porvoo Hunters are an ice hockey club based in Porvoo, Finland. The team played the 2018–19 season in Suomi-sarja (the third top league in Finland after Liiga and Mestis. During the 2018-2019 season they finished 2nd overall and qualified for the promotion playoffs (for the first time) against Peliitat.
