= Jussi Nättinen =

Finnish ice hockey player

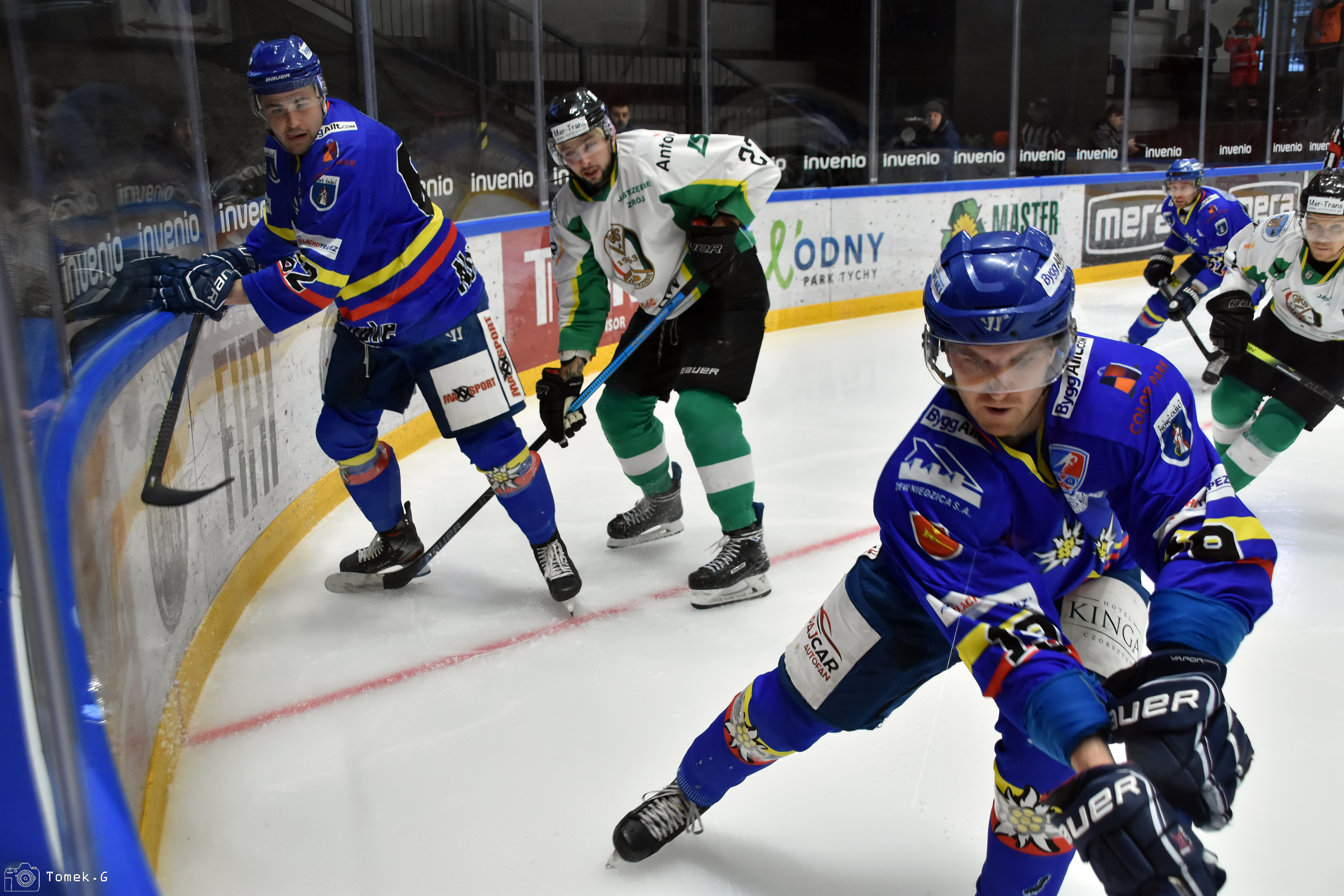
- Born: July 15, 1987 (age 39) Jyväskylä, Finland
- Height: 5 ft 11 in (180 cm)
- Weight: 172 lb (78 kg; 12 st 4 lb)
- Position: Centre
- Shoots: Right
- Ligue Magnus team Former teams: Anglet Hormadi Élite; D Team; Hokki; Kiekko-Laser; KooKoo; Beibarys Atyrau; Reims; Hermes; Starbulls Rosenheim; JYP; KeuPa HT
- NHL draft: Undrafted
- Playing career: 2008–present

Jussi Nättinen (born July 15, 1987) is a Finnish professional ice hockey player. He is currently playing for Anglet Hormadi Élite of the French Ligue Magnus.

Nättinen played seven games in Liiga for JYP during the 2017–18 Liiga season. He was also formerly the captain of Hermes in the Mestis.
