= Sameli Ventelä =

Finnish ice hockey defenceman

- Born: 19 July 1994 (age 32) Hämeenlinna, Finland
- Height: 6 ft 1 in (185 cm)
- Weight: 187 lb (85 kg; 13 st 5 lb)
- Position: Defence
- Shoots: Left
- DEL2 team Former teams: EHC Freiburg; HPK; SaPKo; Lukko; KeuPa HT; Ketterä; HK Dukla Michalovce; Nybro Vikings IF; MHk 32 Liptovský Mikuláš
- Playing career: 2015–present

Sameli Ventelä (born 19 July 1994) is a Finnish professional ice hockey defenceman currently playing for EHC Freiburg of the DEL2.

== Career ==
Ventelä began his career with HPK, playing in their various Jr. teams between 2009 and 2015 but did not play for their senior team. He moved onto SaPKo of Mestis on May 26, 2015, and scored 4 goals and 25 assists in 48 games. On April 15, 2016, Ventelä signed for Lukko and played nine games during the 2016–17 Liiga season, scoring no points.

On June 8, 2017, Ventelä joined Ketterä of Mestis and signed a further extension with the team on March 27, 2018. On August 27, 2019, Ventelä signed for HK Dukla Michalovce of Slovakia's Tipsport Liga. In Januari 2021 he was signed for Nybro Vikings IF.

== Career statistics ==
=== Regular season and playoffs ===
			Regular season					Playoffs
Season	Team	League	GP	G	A	Pts	PIM	GP	G	A	Pts	PIM
