= Karolus Kaarlehto =

Finnish ice hockey defenceman

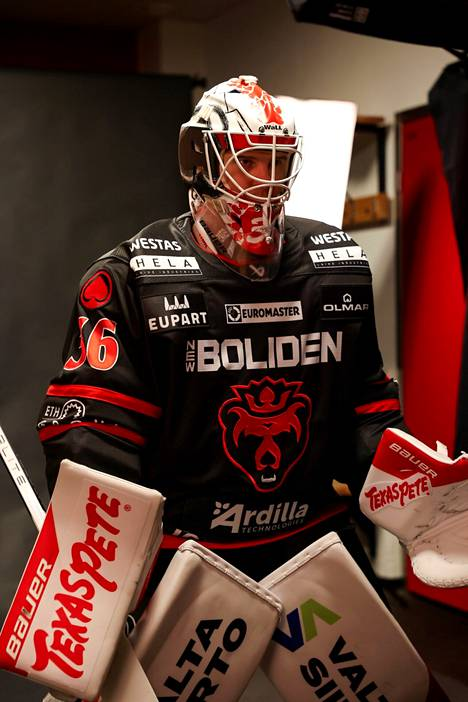
- Kaatlehto with the Porin Ässät
- Born: 1 September 1997 (age 28) Turku, Finland
- Height: 6 ft 1 in (185 cm)
- Weight: 172 lb (78 kg; 12 st 4 lb)
- Position: Goaltender
- Catches: Left
- Liiga team Former teams: Porin Ässät; SaiPa; Esbjerg Energy; MHk 32 Liptovský Mikuláš; HK Dukla Michalovce; Anglet Hormadi Élite; Mikkelin Jukurit; Oulun Kärpät; Timrå IK
- Playing career: 2016–present

Karolus Kaarlehto (born 1 September 1997) is a Finnish professional ice hockey goaltender. He is currently playing for Porin Ässät of the Liiga.

== Playing career ==
Kaarlehto began his career in his native Turku, playing in junior teams for TUTO Hockey and TPS. He had two separate loan spells with TUTO of Mestis in 2016 and 2017. He then spent a month on loan at SaPKo on 2 January 2018 before being loaned to TUTO a third time on 1 February 2018.

On 3 May 2018, Kaarlehto joined SaiPa but was loaned out to Mestis once more, this time to Ketterä on 18 September 2018. Kaarlehto became a member of SaiPa's roster for the 2019–20 Liiga season and made his debut for the team on 14 September 2019 against KooKoo.
