= Rasmus Hämäläinen =

Finnish ice hockey player

- Born: 12 August 1994 (age 31) Lappeenranta, Finland
- Height: 6 ft 0 in (183 cm)
- Weight: 185 lb (84 kg; 13 st 3 lb)
- Position: Right wing
- Shot: Left
- Played for: KooKoo; HC Nové Zámky; SaiPa
- Playing career: 2015–2021

Rasmus Hämäläinen (born 12 August 1994) is a Finnish former professional ice hockey right winger. He played in the Liiga with KooKoo and SaiPa.

== Playing career ==
Hämäläinen began his career with SaiPa's academy from 2008 to 2014 before moving to SaPKo of Mestis. On 11 September 2017 he joined KooKoo of Liiga on loan and played five games for the team during the 2017–18 Liiga season where he registered one assist.

On 12 April 2018 Hämäläinen joined Ketterä of Mestis. On 31 July 2020 he moved to Slovakia and signed for HC Nové Zámky of the Tipos Extraliga.
