= Jarno Lippojoki =

Finnish ice hockey player

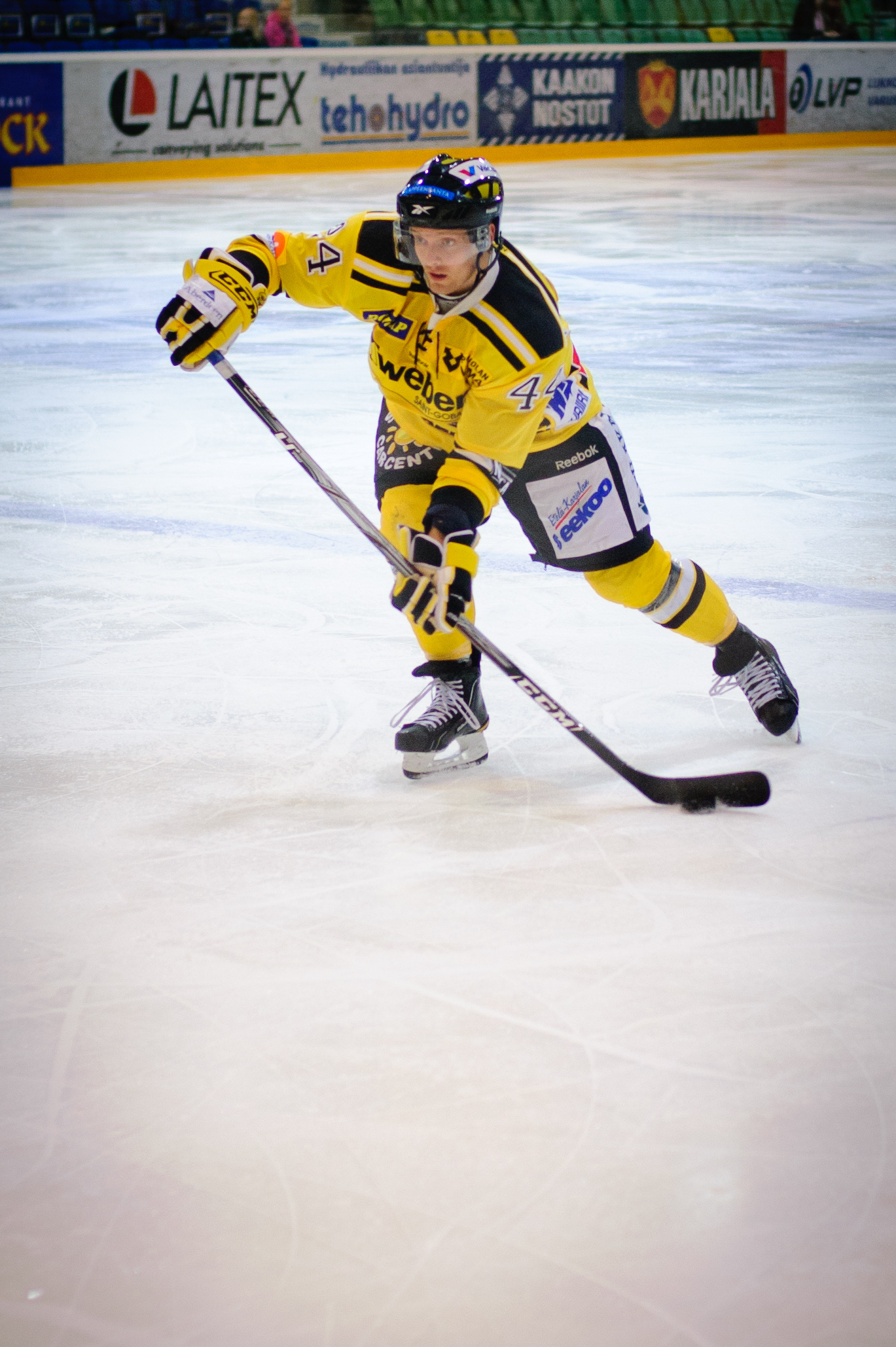
- Born: 17 January 1986 (age 39) Imatra, Finland
- Height: 5 ft 9 in (175 cm)
- Weight: 189 lb (86 kg; 13 st 7 lb)
- Position: Defence
- Shoots: Left
- Mestis team Former teams: Imatran Ketterä; SaiPa; JYP; LHC Les Lions
- Playing career: 2006–present

Jarno Lippojoki is a Finnish ice hockey defenceman who currently plays professionally in Finland for Ketterä of the Mestis. He is captain of Ketterä.
