= Aku Kestilä =

Finnish ice hockey player

- Born: 9 June 1994 (age 30); Pyhäjoki, Finland
- Height: 5 ft 11 in (180 cm)
- Weight: 172 lb (78 kg; 12 st 4 lb)
- Position: Forward
- Shoots: Left
- Liiga team: Oulun Kärpät
- Playing career: 2015–present

Aku Kestilä (born 9 June 1994) is a Finnish professional ice hockey player. He plays for Oulun Kärpät of the Finnish Liiga.

Kestilä made his Liiga debut playing with Oulun Kärpät during the 2014–15 Liiga season.
