= 2014–15 Mestis season =

Finnish ice hockey league season

The 2014–15 Mestis season was the 15th season of the Mestis, the second level of ice hockey in Finland. 10 teams participated in the league, and Jukurit won the championship. Kokkolan Hermes and Jokipojat were promoted to the Mestis league from the Suomi-sarja league for 2015-16.

== Regular season ==
| Rank | Team | GP | W | OTW | OTL | L | GF | GA | Pts |
|---|---|---|---|---|---|---|---|---|---|
| 1 | Jukurit | 56 | 33 | 5 | 3 | 15 | 173 | 111 | 112 |
| 2 | KooKoo | 56 | 32 | 4 | 5 | 15 | 191 | 126 | 109 |
| 3 | TUTO Hockey | 56 | 28 | 7 | 1 | 20 | 177 | 143 | 99 |
| 4 | Hokki | 56 | 26 | 7 | 3 | 20 | 183 | 153 | 95 |
| 5 | JYP-Akatemia | 56 | 28 | 1 | 6 | 21 | 188 | 168 | 92 |
| 6 | LeKi | 56 | 23 | 5 | 6 | 22 | 149 | 158 | 85 |
| 7 | SaPKo | 56 | 22 | 4 | 4 | 26 | 155 | 161 | 78 |
| 8 | KeuPa HT | 56 | 13 | 8 | 5 | 30 | 143 | 217 | 60 |
| 9 | Peliitat | 56 | 16 | 2 | 7 | 31 | 150 | 204 | 59 |
| 10 | Kiekko-Vantaa | 56 | 14 | 2 | 5 | 35 | 139 | 207 | 51 |

== Playoffs ==
Quarter-finals
Jukurit | 4
KeuPa HT | 0
JYP-Akatemia | 2
Hokki | 4
KooKoo | 4
SaPKo | 3
LeKi | 3
TUTO Hockey | 4

Semi-finals
Jukurit | 4
Hokki | 0
KooKoo | 4
TUTO Hockey | 3

Final
Jukurit | 4
KooKoo | 1
Third place
TUTO Hockey | 2
Hokki | 5

== SM-Liiga promotion ==
KooKoo was promoted to SM-liiga at the end of the season.
