= Santeri Heiskanen =

Finnish ice hockey player

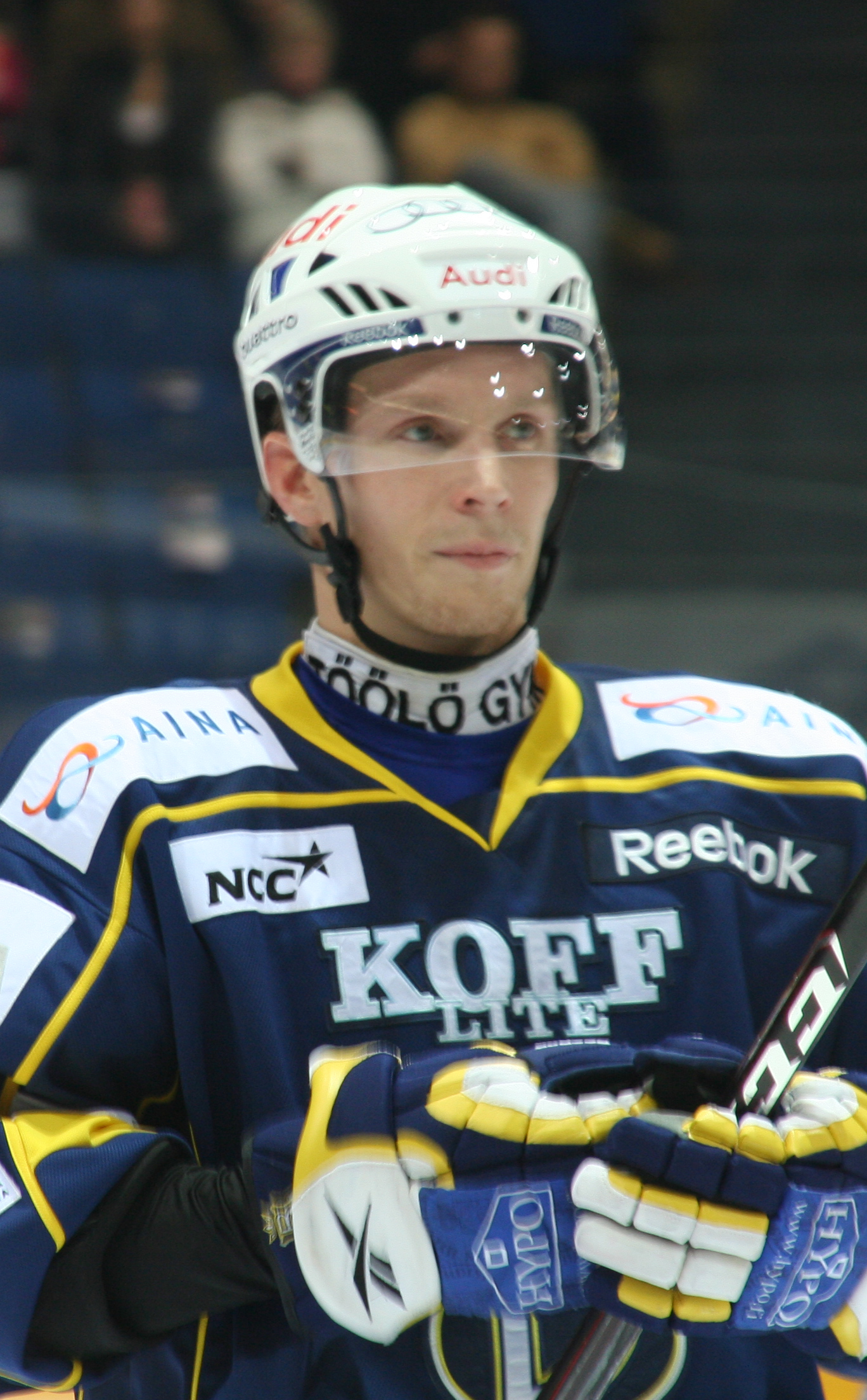
- Image of Santeri Heiskanen
- Born: April 13, 1977 (age 49) Helsinki, Finland
- Height: 5 ft 10 in (178 cm)
- Weight: 170 lb (77 kg; 12 st 2 lb)
- Position: Defence
- Shot: Right
- SM-liiga team: Espoo Blues
- NHL draft: Undrafted
- Playing career: 1996–2011

Santeri Heiskanen (born April 13, 1977) is a Finnish former professional ice hockey defenceman.

Santeri Heiskanen began as an assistant coach for Jokerit U18 in the 2011/12 season. In the 2012/13 season, he joined KHL team Avantgard Omsk. Heiskanen returned to Finland five years ago, first as co-head coach of Peliitat before taking over as head coach of the 2017/18 runner-up.

The following year, Heiskanen joined Vienna Capitals Silver, who were promoted to the Erste Liga. In December of the 2019/20 season, he signed with the South Tyrolean team SV Kaltern Rothoblaas, but the season was cut short due to Covid.
