= Olli Aitola =

Finnish ice hockey player

- Born: February 3, 1992 (age 33); Jyväskylä, Finland
- Height: 6 ft 1 in (185 cm)
- Weight: 185 lb (84 kg; 13 st 3 lb)
- Position: Defenceman
- Shoots: Left
- Mestis team: KeuPa HT (on loan from JYP Jyväskylä)

Olli Aitola (born February 3, 1992) is a Finnish ice hockey player who plays as a defenceman for KeuPa HT on loan from JYP Jyväskylä.

Aitola started playing ice hockey at the age of 4. Aitola won silver in the B-youth I division in the club in 2010 and the 2010–2011 season ended with the A-youth Finnish championship.

He also debuted in the men's games in the same season after playing two matches in the Mestis team D-Team. In the 2011–2012 season, Aitola played five matches in the JYP Academy (formerly D Team) and three Mestis matches in the 2012–2013 season. In the last season, he was the most effective defender of JYP's A-youths with 2+14=16.
