= 2012–13 FFHG Division 1 season =

The 2012–13 FFHG Division 1 season was contested by 14 teams, and saw the Albatros de Brest win the championship. They were promoted to the Ligue Magnus as result. The Bélougas de Toulouse-Blagnac and the Galaxians d’Amnéville were relegated to FFHG Division 2.

== Regular season ==
	Team	GP	W	OTW	OTL	L	GF	GA	Diff	Pts
1.	Albatros de Brest	26	14	3	3	6	132	85	+47	37
2.	Lions de Lyon	26	15	3	1	7	119	82	+37	37
3.	Boxers de Bordeaux	26	14	2	2	8	108	91	+17	34
4.	Vipers de Montpellier	26	12	2	4	8	111	94	+17	32
5.	Phénix de Reims	26	13	1	4	8	97	78	+19	32
6.	Aigles de Nice	26	14	1	2	9	104	83	+21	32
7.	Corsaires de Dunkerque	26	9	5	3	9	93	89	+4	31
8.	Bisons de Neuilly-sur-Marne	26	13	2	0	11	117	106	+11	30
9.	Coqs de Courbevoie	26	14	0	0	12	123	95	+28	28
10.	Orques d'Anglet	26	11	2	1	12	93	88	+5	27
11.	Avalanche Mont-Blanc	26	11	0	1	14	101	133	-32	23
12.	Chevaliers du Lac d’Annecy	26	8	1	2	15	85	123	-38	20
13.	Bélougas de Toulouse-Blagnac	26	8	1	0	17	88	124	-36	18
14.	Galaxians d’Amnéville	26	1	2	2	21	50	150	-100	8

== Playoffs ==
Quarter-finals
Albatros de Brest	2
Bisons de Neuilly-sur-Marne	0
Vipers de Montpellier	1
Phénix de Reims	2
Boxers de Bordeaux	2
Aigles de Nice	0
Lions de Lyon	2
Corsaires de Dunkerque	1

Semi-finals
Albatros de Brest	2
Phénix de Reims	0
Boxers de Bordeaux	0
Lions de Lyon	2

Final
Albatros de Brest	2
Lions de Lyon	0
