= Valtteri Pihlajamäki =

Finnish ice hockey right winger

- Born: July 28, 1996 (age 30) Kiikoinen, Finland
- Height: 5 ft 10 in (178 cm)
- Weight: 190 lb (86 kg; 13 st 8 lb)
- Position: Right wing
- Shoots: Right
- Mestis team Former teams: Peli-Karhut; KeuPa HT; Porin Ässät
- Playing career: 2016–present

Valtteri Pihlajamäki (born July 28, 1996) is a Finnish professional ice hockey right winger currently playing for Iisalmen Peli-Karhut in Mestis.

He made his Liiga debut for Ässät on October 27, 2016, against Sport and went on to play three games that season.
