= 2015–16 Mestis season =

2015–16 Mestis
- League: Mestis
- Sport: Ice hockey
- Duration: September 2015 – March 2016
- Number of teams: 12

Regular season
- Best record: Jukurit
- Runners-up: Hokki
- Top scorer: Oula Palve
- Relegated to Suomi-sarja: KeuPa HT

Playoffs
- Playoffs MVP: Teemu Suhonen
- Finals champions: Mikkelin Jukurit
- Runners-up: Kiekko-Vantaa

Mestis seasons
- ← 2014–15 2016–17 →

The 2015–16 Mestis season was the 16th season of the Mestis, the second level of ice hockey in Finland. 12 teams participated in the league, and Jukurit won the championship.

== Regular season ==
Rank	Team	GP	W	OTW	OTL	L	GF	GA	Pts
1	Jukurit	50	34	4	6	6	207	109	118
2	Hokki	50	28	4	4	14	160	128	98
3	Jokipojat	50	22	10	4	14	158	122	90
4	SaPKo	50	23	7	5	15	169	149	88
5	KeuPa HT	50	19	7	5	19	140	126	76
6	Hermes	50	22	2	6	20	158	167	76
7	TUTO Hockey	50	17	9	6	18	148	149	75
8	Kiekko-Vantaa	50	17	7	3	23	141	148	70
9	Peliitat Heinola	50	16	3	9	22	125	165	64
10	LeKi	50	13	3	8	26	131	168	53
11	JYP-Akatemia	50	13	3	4	30	110	161	50
12	RoKi	50	12	5	4	29	122	177	50

== Playoffs ==
Quarter-finals
Jukurit	4
Kiekko-Vantaa	3
SaPKo	1
KeuPa HT	4
Hokki	4
TUTO Hockey	3
Jokipojat	4
Hermes	3

Semi-finals
Jukurit	4
KeuPa HT	1
Hokki	4
Jokipojat	2

Final
Jukurit	4
Hokki	0
Third place
Jokipojat	4
KeuPa HT	3

== SM-Liiga promotion ==
			Series	1	2	3	4	5	6	7
Tampereen Ilves	–	Jukurit	4:1	2:0	3:1	2:1 OT	4:7	4:2	-	-

Tampereen Ilves remained in the SM-Liiga.

== Qualification ==
=== Play-outs ===
- JYP-Akatemia - JHT Kalajoki 4:0 on series.
- RoKi - Imatran Ketterä 4:0 on series.

=== Qualification round ===
Rank	Team	GP	W	OTW	OTL	L	GF	GA	Diff	Pts
1.	HCK	6	5	1	0	0	23	10	+13	17
2.	RoKi	6	3	1	0	2	15	11	+4	11
3.	KeuPa HT	6	1	0	1	4	19	27	−8	4
4.	Pyry Nokia	6	1	0	1	4	19	28	−9	4
