= Berlinda of Meerbeke =

Brabantian Benedictine nun and saint (died 702)

Saint Berlindis
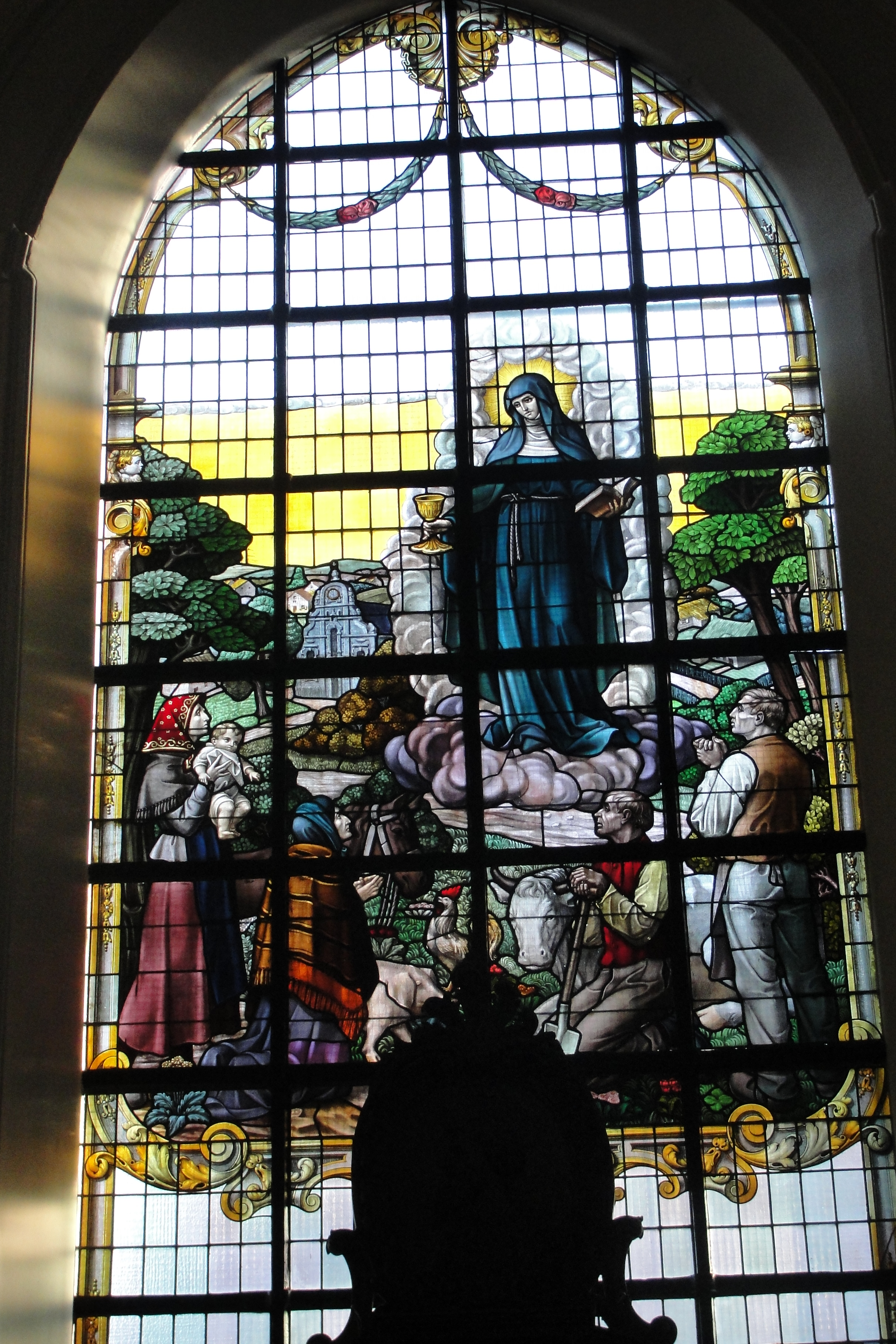
- Stained glass window of Saint Berlindis in Sint-Pieter en Sint-Berlindiskerk, in Meerbeke, Belgium
- Died: c. 702 AD
- Venerated in: Roman Catholic Church, Eastern Orthodox Church
- Canonized: 1625, Rome by Pope Urban VIII
- Feast: February 3
- Attributes: Depicted as a Brabantian nun with a cow and either a pruning hook or branch; sometimes portrayed with Saints Nona and Celsa
- Patronage: Protectress of trees and invoked against cattle diseases

Berlinda (Latin: Berlindis, Berlenda, Berelenda, other variants; also known as Bellaude; died 702 AD) was a Benedictine nun of noble descent. Her feast day is 3 February.

== Life ==
Berlinda was born in Meerbeke (Meerbeche, Marbec) in the Low Countries, (now a district of Ninove in the Denderstreek in the province of East Flanders in the region of Flanders in Belgium). She was the daughter of the wealthy Count Odelard, squire of Duke Wiger of Lorraine, and his holy wife Nona.

Her father owned large estates in the center of present-day Belgium. They covered the area between Antwerp and Liège, including the castle of Ombergen between Ghent and Ninove, and Assche between Aalst and Brussels. Nona died when Berlinda was twelve years old.

Her father had fought against the Normans, who were finally defeated partly with the help of Arnold of Carinthia. However, his only son Eligard was killed and upon his return to Meerbeke, Odelard came down with leprosy. All this ensured that Odelard became a bitter man. Although Berlinda cared for him with great love, she took every precaution to avoid becoming infected.

According to legend one day Odelardo thought he noticed in his daughter a certain disgust for his illness, and thinking she would abandon him, he renounced her in favor of the monastery of Santa Gertrude de Nivelles. Berlinda, disinherited by her father, entered the monastery of St. Maria in Moorsel and became a Benedictine nun.

After her father died, Berlinda returned to the family property and buried him next to her mother in the local church of St. Peter. She did not return to Moorsel, but started, with several women from the neighborhood, her own convent and church in her parents' home. For the rest of her life, she helped the poor and needy while living a strict ascetic life. Many miracles were attributed to her intercession.

== Veneration ==
Berlinda's highly legendary biography was written around the year 900 by Hubert, a monk from the monastery in Lobbes, based on information from his client, provost Gerhard of Meerbeke.

Berlinda is one of the most popular and venerated saints in Belgium. She is considered as special patroness against various diseases in animals, especially cattle; the saint is therefore particularly popular in agricultural areas. Around Pentecost, various pilgrimages from Flanders, Brabant and Hainaut go to Meerbeke to the tomb of the saint.

Berlinda is celebrated on 3 February, especially in the Benedictine Order and in the diocese of Ghent, sometimes together with the sisters Celsa and Nona, of whom little is known. Virgins of Brabant, their bodies were found buried near that of Berlinda.

Roman Martyrology: "In Meerbeke in Brabant, in today's Belgium, Saint Berlinda, virgin, who led a religious life of poverty and charity in this city".

== Literature ==
- Van Droogenbroeck, F. J., 'Paltsgraaf Wigerik van Lotharingen, inspiratiebron voor de legendarische graaf Witger in de Vita Gudilae', Eigen Schoon en De Brabander 93 (2010) 113–136.
- Van Droogenbroeck, F. J., 'Hugo van Lobbes (1033-1053), auteur van de Vita Amalbergae viduae, Vita S. Reinildis en Vita S. Berlendis', Eigen Schoon en De Brabander 94 (2011) 367–402.
