= Simo Mälkiä =

Finnish ice hockey player and coach

- Born: 21 August 1983 (age 43) Lappeenranta, FIN
- Height: 5 ft 8 in (173 cm)
- Weight: 172 lb (78 kg; 12 st 4 lb)
- Position: Defence
- Shot: Right
- Played for: KooKoo; Jukurit; SaiPa; Jokerit
- Playing career: 2000–2012

Simo Mälkiä (born 21 August 1983 in Lappeenranta, Finland) is a Finnish former ice hockey defenceman. He played in the Finnish SM-liiga for SaiPa and Jokerit. He retired on 20 February 2012 due to injury.

His father Heikki Mälkiä also played professional hockey, spending much of his career with Saipa and was head coach of HDD Olimpija Ljubljana in the Austrian Hockey League.
