= Talvisalo ice rink =

Ice rink in Savonlinna, Finland

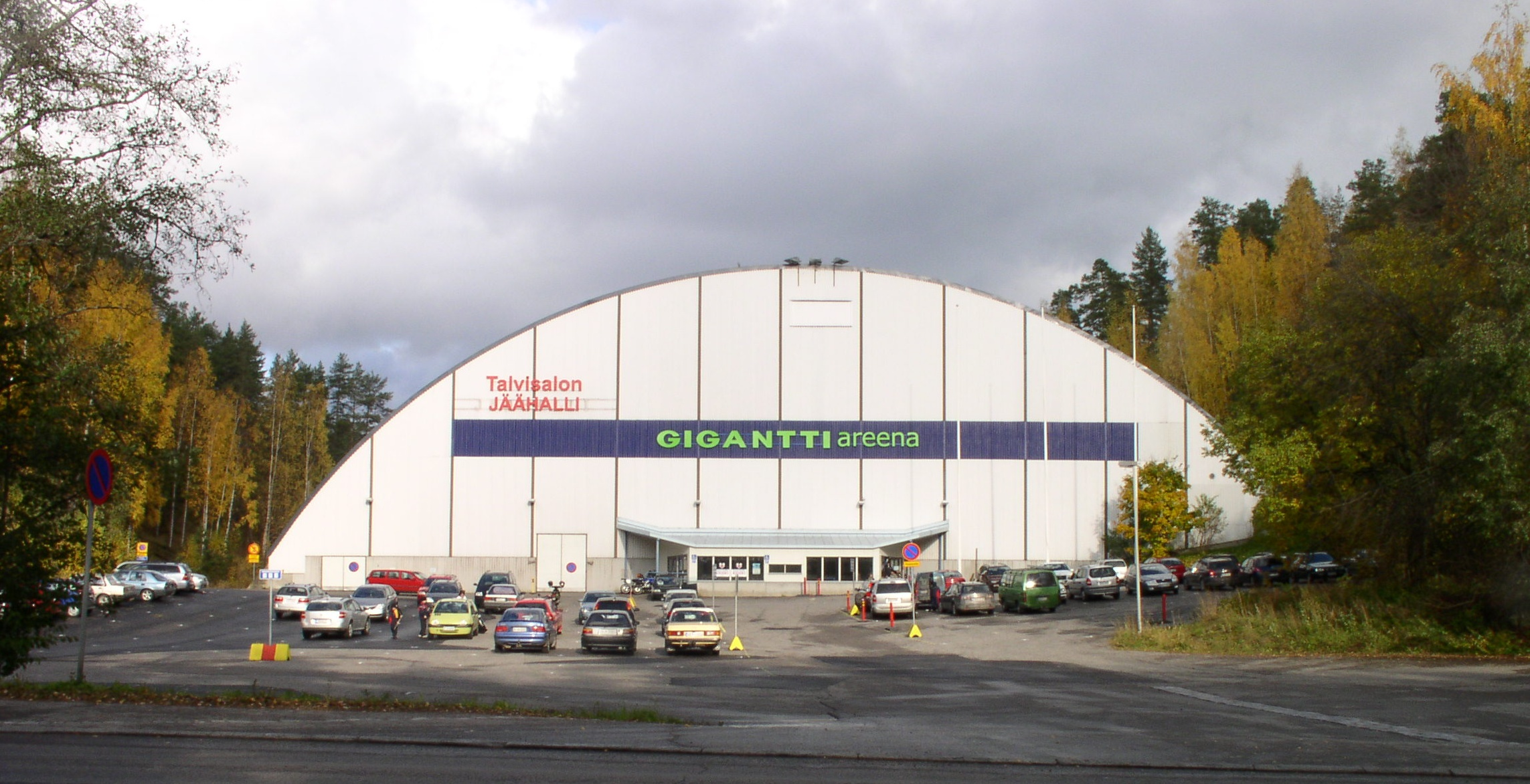
- Interactive map of Talvisalo ice rink
- Location: Savonlinna, Finland
- Coordinates: 61.87272°N 28.86151°E
- Capacity: 2,833

Construction
- Opened: 1979

Tenant
- SaPKo

Talvisalo ice rink is an indoor arena and ice rink in Savonlinna, Finland. The arena was built in 1978 and has a capacity of 2,833 spectators. It is the home of SaPKo, in the Suomi-sarja ice hockey league (the third league in Finland, behind Mestis).

== History ==
In 2008 Gigantti became the main sponsor of SaPKo, and the arena was named after them as Gigantti arena. Gigantti's sponsorship agreement with SaPKo ended in 2011, and the arena returned to its original name.
