= JHT Kalajoki =

JHT
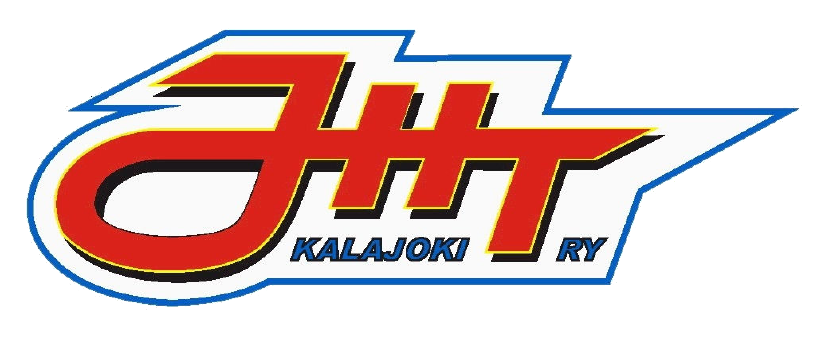
- City: Kalajoki, Finland
- League: Suomi-sarja
- Founded: 1992
- Home arena: Kalajoen Jäähalli (capacity 1,700)
- Colours
- Owner(s): JHT Kalajoki ry
- General manager: (Finland) Risto Apuli
- Head coach: (Finland) Timo Keppo
- Captain: (Finland) Henri Mustonen
- Website: http://www.jht.fi

JHT is a Finnish ice hockey team based at Kalajoki. Full name of the club is Junkkarit Hockey Team. JHT plays in Kalajoki at Kalajoen jäähalli which holds about 1,700, they currently play in the 3rd level in the Finnish hockey leagues (Suomi-sarja). JHT won the 2017–18 season of Suomi-sarja and faced Peliitat Heinola in the promotion playoff to Mestis but failed to get promoted.
