= Versowood Areena =

Indoor arena in Heinola, Finland

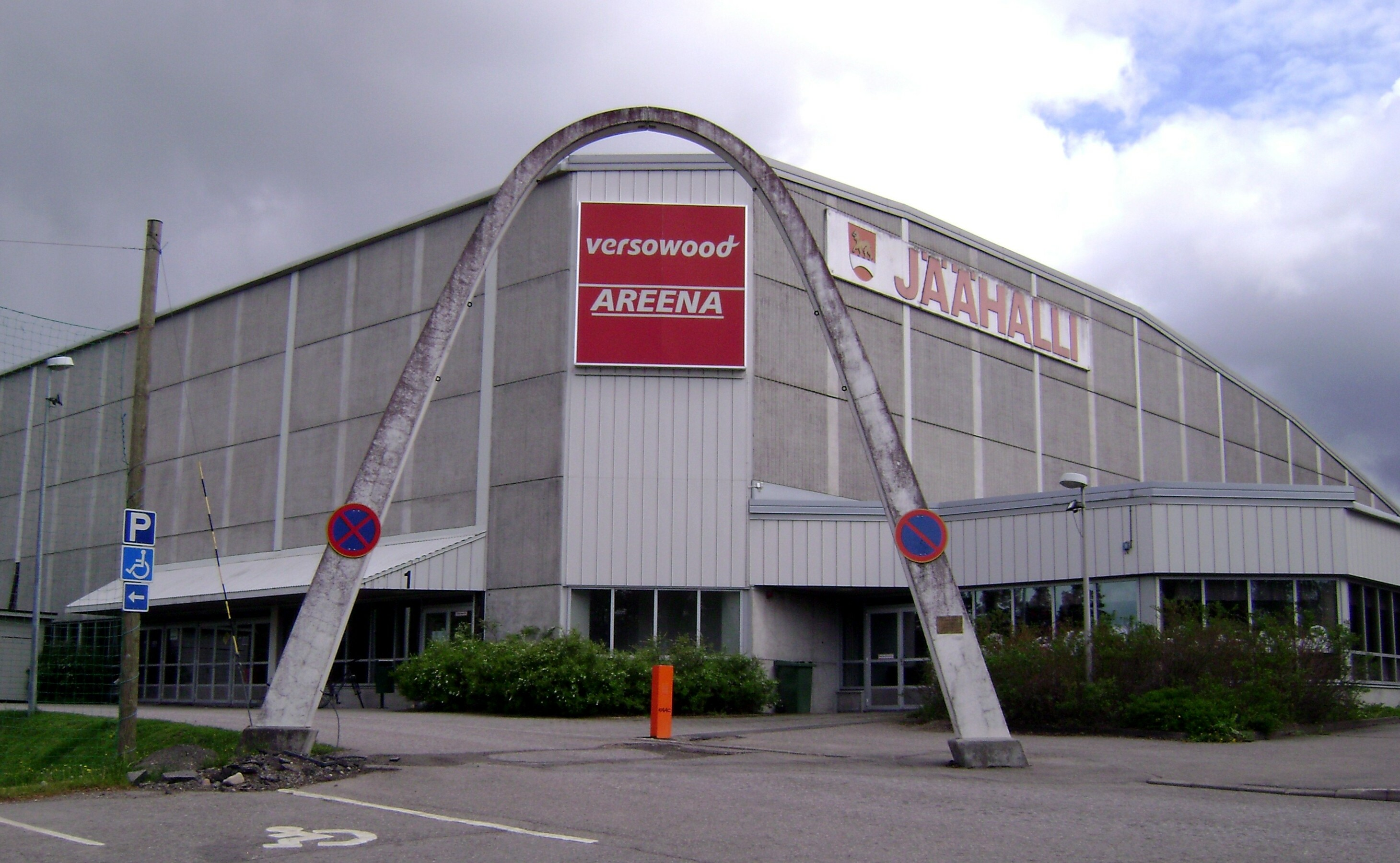
- Interactive map of Versowood Areena
- Address: Urheilukatu 2
- Location: Heinola, Finland
- Coordinates: 61.2041°N 26.0463°E
- Owner: City of Heinola
- Capacity: 2,975
- Surface: ice

Construction
- Groundbreaking: 1983
- Opened: 1984

Tenants
- Peliitat Heinola; Heinola Ringette

Versowood Areena is an indoor arena in Heinola, Finland. The arena was built in 1984 and has a capacity of 2975 where 1500 can be seated and 1475 can stand. It is the home arena for Peliitat Heinola of the 2. Divisioona.

== History ==
Construction of the arena lasted from 1983 to 1984. The first match played was a test match friendly between the international squads Sweden and Finland which drew in a full crowd. The ceiling also holds the jerseys of Heinola greats Marko Nyman and Vesa Welling whose numbers 16 and 19 were retired by the team.
