= Masku Areena =

Indoor arena in Lempäälä, Finland

Coordinates: 61.3408°N 23.7461°E

Masku Arena
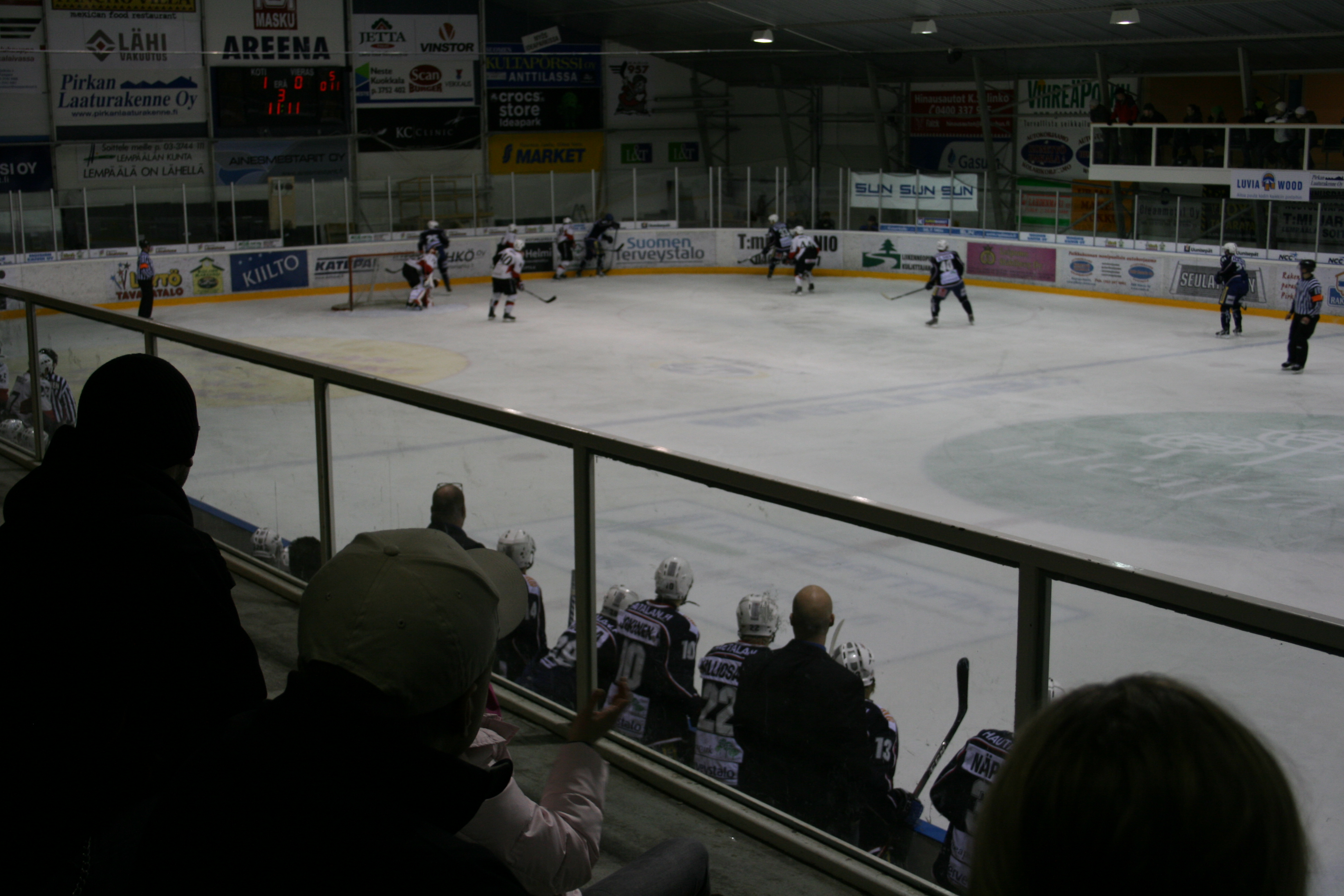
- Masku Arena
- Interactive map of Masku Arena
- Location: Lempäälä Finland
- Capacity: 900

Construction
- Opened: 1995

Tenant
- LeKi

Masku Areena is an indoor arena in Lempäälä, Finland. The arena was built in 1995 and has a capacity of 900. It is the home arena for LeKi of the Mestis hockey league, the second top league in Finland behind Liiga. The arena is a part of the Hakkari Sports Centre, which also hosts tennis courts, ice skating rinks, and more.

The record attendance for a game was in 2011, where a game featuring the Ilves vs Ässät drew a crowd of 810.

The arena was previously known as the Xerox arena until it was renamed in 2007.
