= KeuPa HT =

- City: Keuruu, Finland
- League: Mestis
- Founded: 1995 (31 years ago)
- Operated: 1995–present
- Home arena: Keuruu Ice Hall; 1200 Capacity
- Colours: Blue, Red, White and Black
- General manager: (Finland) Juuso Mörsky
- Head coach: (Finland) Tomas Westerlund
- Captain: (Finland) Juho Koivusaari
- Affiliates: JYP Jyväskylä, Vaajakosken Pelikaanit
- Website: KeuPa HT Home

Franchise history
- 1995–present: KeuPa HT

Championships
- Mestis: 1 (2018)
- Suomi-sarja: 2 (2012, 2014)

KeuPa HT are a semi-professional ice hockey team based in Keuruu, Finland. They are members of the second highest league in Finland, Mestis. The club was founded in 1995 in the Finnish fourth division II-Divisioona after the ice hockey club decided to part company with the Keuruu sports club. They play their home games in the Keuruu Ice Hall, which holds 1200 spectators. KeuPa are two time Suomi-sarja champions and one time Mestis champions.

== History ==
KeuPa HT was born in 1995 after the ice hockey branch of the Keuruu sports club split from the football and ice skating branches. KeuPa kept their traditional name but added "Hockey Team" to the end to differentiate themselves; hence, the abbreviation HT appears at the end of the name.

The club was promoted to the third division, Suomi-sarja, in 2011–2012 and went on to claim the gold medal and win the third-division championship. By winning, they entered the playoffs with LeKi, KooVee and HCK that year for the right to be promoted to the second division, Mestis. KeuPa finished third in the playoffs and remained in Suomi-sarja, while the other two clubs were promoted to Mestis. HCK, who came second in the playoffs, were promoted only because Wafer-Laser went bankrupt and had to pull out of Mestis.

In the 2012–2013 season, the club sought to defend their title but could manage only a third-place finish at the conclusion of the season, winning the bronze medal. RoKi won the championship title and qualified for Mestis. KeuPa HT had to settle for another season in the third division after coming close to promotion again. The head coach quit at the end of the season.

The 2013–2014 season started off badly for the club. They had not been able to find a replacement for their head coach, and the club was in a precarious financial situation, staring at bankruptcy or folding the club up and ceasing operations, which would mean that they would not be able to compete in the Suomi-sarja season. The KeuPa HT players started a fundraising campaign to raise the money needed to keep the club afloat and allow them to compete in the league that year. By season's start, they had managed to raise the needed money, and they began the season on schedule. The club went through a rocky, patchy start to the season but managed to gain momentum at the end of the regular season and just reach the playoff finals. In the playoffs, KeuPa dispatched with RoKi and Bewe Tuuskin to meet FPS (formerly FoPS) of Forssa in the final. KeuPa HT beat FPS in the final and qualified for Mestis for the first time, ending what became a Cinderella season from a very bleak start.

KeuPa HT went through two head coaches in their first season in the second division in 2014–2015, firstly Jussi Tupamäki then Kari Rautakorpi from 23 February 2015. The team finished the regular season in 8th position, just missing out on the relegation positions of 9 and 10. Their record for the season was 13 wins and 30 losses with 8 overtime victories and 5 overtime losses for a total of 60 points from 56 matches.

== Season-by-season-results ==
Champions	Runners-up	Third Place	Promoted	Relegated

KeuPa HT
Season	League	P	W	OW	OL	L	GF	GA	GD	Pts	Finish	Post season	Cup	Pro/Rel
2008–09	II-divisioona	20	13	2	1	4	151	90	+61	44	3rd	-	-	-
2009–10	II-divisioona	18	18	0	0	0	191	47	+144	54	1st	Champion	-	-
2010–11	II-divisioona	21	15	1	2	3	158	84	+74	49	2nd	Runner-up	-	Promoted
2011–12	Suomi-sarja	22	16	2	0	4	139	68	+71	52	1st	Qualification loss	-	-
2012–13	Suomi-sarja	22	13	1	2	6	100	63	+37	43	3rd	Qualification loss	-	-
2013–14	Suomi-sarja	38	20	0	3	15	165	141	+24	63	7th	Champion	-	Promoted
2014–15	Mestis	56	13	8	5	30	143	217	-74	60	8th	Quarterfinal loss	-	-
2015–16	Mestis	50	19	7	5	19	140	126	+14	76	5th	Bronze game loss	-	-
2016–17	Mestis	50	19	6	3	22	144	156	-12	72	8th	Quarterfinal loss	-	-
2017–18	Mestis	50	30	2	3	15	182	132	+50	97	1st	Champion	Quarterfinal loss	-
2018–19	Mestis	50	18	5	5	22	151	139	+12	69	8th	Runner-up	Runner-up	-
2019–20	Mestis	50	25	5	8	25	189	182	+7	78	6th	Cancelled	3rd Round	-
2020–21	Mestis	31	17	2	2	10	112	102	+10	57	4th	Quarterfinal loss	-	-
2021–22	Mestis	52	22	4	6	20	165	170	-5	80	5th	-	Qualification loss	-

== Honours ==
=== Championships ===
- Mestis

(gold) Champions (1): 2017–18
(silver) Runners-Up (1): 2018–19

- Suomi-sarja

(gold) Champions (2): 2011–12, 2013–14

== Players ==
=== Current roster ===
Team roster for the 2021–22 Mestis season

KeuPa HT roster - 2021–22 Mestis season
Active roster		Coaching staff
Goaltenders: 35 (Finland) Juho Ahopelto; 35 (Finland) Sami Suni; 70 (Finland) Samuli Tervo; Defencemen: 60 (Finland) Olli Aitola (A); 63 (Finland) Aleksi Ek; 28 (Finland) Jani Kluuskeri; 4 (Finland) Kimi Kuusela (Loan); 6 (Finland) Mikko Lahtinen (A); 37 (Finland) Atro Leppänen; 8 (Finland) Tomi Niku (Loan); 26 (Finland) Ville Ottavainen (Loan); 4 (Finland) Eetu Pylkkänen; 22 (Finland) Elias Ruusu (Loan); 26 (Finland) Santeri Suistio; 44 (Finland) Sakari Turtiainen	Forwards: 11 (Finland) Joni Airo (Loan); 42 (Finland) Atte Antinaho; 8 (Finland) Niko Himmanen (Loan); 25 (Finland) Konsta Keteli; 90 (Finland) Juho Koivusaari; 7 (Finland) Janne Kumpulainen; 12 (Finland) Oula Kuure; 91 (Finland) Joonas Larinmaa (A); 47 (Finland) Niklas Lehikoinen; 9 (Finland) Miro Lehtimäki; 88 (Finland) Justus Mikkonen; 85 (Finland) Tomi Mäntynen (Loan); 20 (Finland) Tommi Niskanen; 73 (Finland) Valtteri Pihlajamäki (Loan); 94 (Finland) Joni Piipponen (C); 22 (Finland) Samuel Salonen; 14 (Finland) Jani Siekkinen; 75 (Finland) Samuel Valkeejärvi (Loan); 17 (Finland) Veeti Vuorio	Coaches: (Finland) Max Walther; (Finland) Tuomo Riikonen; (Finland) Antti Leskinen; Legend (C) Captain (A) Alternate Captain (Loan) Player on loan with club Statistics; Average age: 23.4; Average height: 181.2 cm Average weight: 82.7 kg
Last updated on: 13 April 2022
Elite Prospects

=== Well-known former players ===
A list of players that have played for KeuPa HT and gone onto play at the top professional level of hockey in Finland or abroad.

Name	League(s)
(Finland) Joni Lius	SM-liiga; Elitserien; Austria
(Finland) Olli Palola	SM-liiga; KHL; SHL
(Finland) Sinuhe Wallinheimo	SM-liiga
(Finland) Waltteri Lehtonen	SM-liiga; AlpsHL
(Finland) Taneli Maasalo	ALIH
(Finland) Petri Pitkänen	AIHL

== Team staff ==
Current as of 2021–22 Mestis season

KeuPa Staff
Role	Staff
Head coach	(Finland) Tomas Westerlund
Assistant coach	(Finland) Max Walther
Assistant coach	(Finland) Tuomo Riikonen
Goalkeeping coach	(Finland) Antti Leskinen
Team manager	(Finland) Tuomo Riikonen
Equipment manager	(Finland) Johannes Manni
Physical therapist	(Finland) Kari Rautakorpi

== Leaders ==
=== Team captains ===
All team captains of the club since 2005-06:

Name	Term
(Finland) Janne Väliaho	2005–2006
(Finland) Heikki Virkajärvi	2006–2009
(Finland) Toni Rautakorpi	2009–2011
(Finland) Jani Lyytinen	2011–2012
(Finland) Matias Kiiskinen	2012–2013
(Finland) Taneli Maasalo	2013–2017
(Finland) Samuel Salonen	2016–2017
(Finland) Jani Ollitervo	2016–2017
(Finland) Markus Jokinen	2017–2018
(Finland) Waltteri Lehtonen	2017–2019
(Finland) Joni Piipponen	2019–2021
(Finland) Juho Koivusaari	2021–Present

=== Head coaches ===
All head coaches of the club since 2007-08:

Name	Term
(Finland) Kari Rautakorpi	2007–2015
(Finland) Jussi Tupamäki	2014–2015
(Finland) Ville Nieminen	2015–2016
(Finland) Mikko Heiskanen	2016–2018
(Finland) Niko Härkönen	2018–2019
(Finland) Niko Eronen	2019–2020
(Finland) Tomas Westerlund	2020–Present
