= Lempäälän Kisa =

LeKi
- City: Lempäälä, Finland
- League: Suomi-sarja
- Founded: 1904
- Home arena: Masku Areena (capacity 900)
- Colours
- General manager: Vesa Papinsaari
- Head coach: Sami Hirvonen
- Captain: Matti Kaipainen
- Affiliates: Ilves (SM-liiga); Tappara (SM-liiga)
- Website: http://www.lekimestis.fi/

Previous logo

Lempäälän Kisa (LeKi) is an ice hockey team from Lempäälä, Finland. They currently compete in the Suomi-sarja. Their home rink is Masku Areena, which currently has a seating capacity of only 900 people.

== Retired numbers ==
- 5 Vesa Papinsaari
- 8 Risto Mikkola
- 17 Markku Joensuu
- 19 Kari Virtanen
