= Peliitat Heinola =

Ice hockey club based in Heinola, Finland

Heinolan Peliitat
- City: Heinola, Finland
- League: 2. Divisioona
- Founded: 1984
- Home arena: Versowood Areena
- Colours: Red, white, black
- Owner(s): Heinolan Peliitat Oy
- Head coach: Jani Keinänen
- Media: Itä-Häme
- Affiliate: Lahti Pelicans (Liiga)
- Website: peliitat.fi

Franchise history
- 1984–1989: Heinolan Peliitat
- 1989–2011: Heinolan Kiekko
- 2011–present: Heinolan Peliitat

Heinolan Peliitat (formerly Heinolan Kiekko) is an ice hockey club based in Heinola, Finland. The club is made up of 11 teams with the top team playing in the 2. Divisioona, the 4th tier of ice hockey in Finland. They play their home games in the Versowood Areena, which has a capacity of 2,975 (with 1,500 seated). The club is affiliated with the Liiga side Lahti Pelicans.

== History ==
The original Peliitat was founded in 1969 and played in 1983–1987 and 1988–1989 in the I-Divisioona. The club's activities ended with relegation from the I-Divisioona and bankruptcy in 1989.

After the bankruptcy of Peliitat, Heinola Kiekko, founded in 1984, became the leading ice hockey club in Heinola. HeKi played for a long time in the 2. Divisioona and got promoted in 1999 into the Suomi-sarja. Success finally came in the 2004–05 season, when HeKi finished second in the series. In the finals, HeKi still had to face a loss to the Seinäjoki Hockey Team.

In the 2005–06 season, HeKi won the Suomi-sarja championship and also the Mestis qualifiers, beating Kokkolan Hermes, among others. For the 2006–07 season, HeKi rose to the second-highest league in Finland. At the same time, the activities of the representative team were separated from the junior teams.

In April 2011, the operation of HeKi's representative team was incorporated as Heinola Edustuskiekon Tuki Oy, and at the same time, the name Heinolan Peliitat, considered nostalgic in the city, was taken to use again.

After the 2022–23 Mestis season, Peliitat played Nokian Pyry in the Mestis qualifiers and avoided relegation. Peliitat later went bankrupt and did not receive a Mestis license for the 2023–24 season and thus got relegated down two tiers into the 2. Divisioona.

== Retired numbers ==
- #16 - Marko Nyman
- #19 - Vesa Welling
- #27 - Steven MacDonald

== Peliitat alumni ==
- Tim Army
- John Donnelly
- Marko Ek
- Donald Fraser
- Niko Hovinen
- Jani Keinänen
- Kurt Kleinendorst
- Ville-Matti Koponen
- Steve MacDonald
- Lauri Mononen
- Erkki Mäkelä
- Juha Ovaska
- Seppo Repo
- Karri Rämö
- Janne Sinkkonen
- Antti Tyrväinen
