= Kokkolan Hermes =

Finnish ice hockey club in Kokkola

- City: Kokkola, Finland
- League: Mestis
- Founded: 1953
- Home arena: Kokkolan jäähalli
- Colours
- Owner: Edustus Hermes ry
- General manager: Hannu Myllymäki
- Head coach: Antti Karhula
- Captain: Jussi Nättinen
- Affiliates: Sport (Liiga); JHT (Suomi-sarja)
- Website: www.kokkolanhermes.fi

Kokkolan Hermes is a Finnish semi-professional ice hockey club based in Kokkola that plays in the Mestis, the second-tier men's league in Finland after Liiga. The club was founded in 1953 and plays their home games at the Kokkolan jäähalli, which has a capacity of 4,200 spectators.

The club also supports an active minor ice hockey department, which hosts junior teams in the men's U16 Mestis, U17 Mestis, U18 Mestis, U18 Aluesarja, and U20 Mestis. Hermes previously included women's teams in the U16 Naisten Aluesarja and, until 2019, the U20 Finnish Championship tournament (Finnish: U20 SM-turnaus).

== History ==
The club was founded in 1953 when the ice hockey players of GBK and KPV merged their operations and formed the new club Kokkolan Hermes. The team was named after the Greek Olympian messenger god Hermes who was also the god of sports and athletes.

Hermes played in the second top league of Finland from 1993–2006 before being regulated to Suomi-sarja where they remained until 2015 when they were promoted back to Mestis.

Hermes won the 1996 I-Divisioona championship, the only championship in the club's history.

During the 2008-09 season, Hermes ran into financial troubles and were forced to leave the Suomi-sarja.

== Retired numbers ==
- #1 - Tapio Salo
- #7 - Tuomo Valavaara
- 9 - Eino Pollari
- 23 - Jani Uski
- 91 - Jouni Kalliokoski
