= Timo Hirvonen =

Finnish ice hockey player (1973–2023)

- Born: 5 December 1973; Varkaus, Finland
- Died: 28 July 2023 (aged 49); Espoo, Finland
- Height: 5 ft 10 in (178 cm)
- Weight: 187 lb (85 kg; 13 st 5 lb)
- Position: Left wing
- Shot: Right
- Played for: Espoo Blues
- NHL draft: Undrafted
- Playing career: 1992–2006

Timo Olavi Hirvonen (5 December 1973 – 28 July 2023) was a Finnish professional ice hockey player. Hirvonen made his Liiga debut playing with Kiekko-Espoo during the 1992–93 SM-liiga season, and served as an assistant coach with the Espoo Blues.

Hirvonen died from complications from surgery in July 2023, at the age of 49.

== Career statistics ==
			Regular season					Playoffs
Season	Team	League	GP	G	A	Pts	PIM	GP	G	A	Pts	PIM
1990–91	Kiekko-Espoo	I-Divisioona	8	0	1	1	0	—	—	—	—	—
1990–91	Kiekko-Espoo U20	Jr. A SM-sarja	21	9	7	16	57	—	—	—	—	—
1991–92	Kiekko-Espoo	I-Divisioona	43	10	5	15	24	—	—	—	—	—
1992–93	Kiekko-Espoo	Liiga	22	4	4	8	8	—	—	—	—	—
1992–93	Kiekko-Espoo U20	Jr. A SM-liiga	5	2	4	6	8	—	—	—	—	—
1993–94	Kiekko-Espoo	Liiga	46	7	7	14	46	—	—	—	—	—
1993–94	Kiekko-Espoo U20	Jr. A SM-liiga	6	2	2	4	6	—	—	—	—	—
1994–95	Kiekko-Espoo	Liiga	28	1	3	4	16	4	0	1	1	2
1995–96	Kiekko-Espoo	Liiga	44	11	11	22	36	—	—	—	—	—
1996–97	Kiekko-Espoo	Liiga	44	8	13	21	59	4	1	0	1	2
1997–98	Kiekko-Espoo	Liiga	47	6	5	11	28	8	1	0	1	18
1998–99	Espoo Blues	Liiga	54	5	8	13	40	4	0	0	0	4
1999–00	Espoo Blues	Liiga	47	14	12	26	52	4	0	0	0	8
2000–01	Espoo Blues	Liiga	56	8	8	16	44	—	—	—	—	—
2001–02	Espoo Blues	Liiga	56	6	9	15	42	3	0	0	0	0
2002–03	Espoo Blues	Liiga	23	0	1	1	2	7	0	0	0	0
2003–04	SaiPa	Liiga	42	10	16	26	61	—	—	—	—	—
2004–05	SaiPa	Liiga	44	11	17	28	44	—	—	—	—	—
2004–05	Malmö Redhawks	SHL	7	0	1	1	4	10	0	2	2	2
2005–06	Espoo Blues	Liiga	54	7	3	10	54	9	0	0	0	8
Liiga totals			607	98	117	215	532	43	2	1	3	42
