= Joonas Jääskeläinen =

Finnish ice hockey player

- Born: July 14, 1973 (age 52) Helsinki, Finland
- Height: 6 ft 1 in (185 cm)
- Weight: 190 lb (86 kg; 13 st 8 lb)
- Position: Right wing
- Shot: Left
- Played for: Espoo Blues; Lahti Pelicans; Leksands IF
- Playing career: 1993–2004

Joonas Jääskeläinen (born July 14, 1973) is a Finnish former professional ice hockey winger.

== Career statistics ==
			Regular season					Playoffs
Season	Team	League	GP	G	A	Pts	PIM	GP	G	A	Pts	PIM
1992–93	Karhu-Kissat	I-Divisioona	7	0	1	1	2	—	—	—	—	—
1993–94	Karhu-Kissat	I-Divisioona	36	15	26	41	12	—	—	—	—	—
1993–94	Kiekko-Espoo U20	Jr. A SM-liiga	1	0	0	0	0	—	—	—	—	—
1993–94	Espoo Blues	Liiga	10	1	2	3	0	—	—	—	—	—
1994–95	Espoo Blues	Liiga	50	11	6	17	14	4	1	0	1	0
1995–96	Espoo Blues	Liiga	50	12	10	22	10	—	—	—	—	—
1996–97	Espoo Blues	Liiga	44	22	6	28	10	1	0	0	0	2
1997–98	Espoo Blues	Liiga	47	19	13	32	20	8	1	0	1	2
1998–99	Espoo Blues	Liiga	50	16	12	28	10	4	0	1	1	0
1999–00	Espoo Blues	Liiga	37	13	8	21	16	4	0	2	2	2
2000–01	Espoo Blues	Liiga	48	5	11	16	10	—	—	—	—	—
2001–02	Lahti Pelicans	Liiga	51	23	11	34	32	4	0	0	0	2
2002–03	Lahti Pelicans	Liiga	36	9	4	13	4	—	—	—	—	—
2003–04	Leksands IF	SHL	24	6	4	10	2	2	0	0	0	0
Liiga totals			423	131	83	214	126	25	2	3	5	8
