= Tero Lehterä =

Finnish ice hockey player and coach (born 1972)

- Born: 21 April 1972 (age 54) Espoo, Finland
- Height: 1.83 m (6 ft 0 in)
- Weight: 87 kg (192 lb; 13 st 10 lb)
- Position: Centre
- Shot: Left
- Played for: Tappara; Jokerit; HPK; Espoo Blues; Malmö IF; Fort Wayne Komets; Neftekhimik Nizhnekamsk; EHC Basel; HC Ambri-Piotta
- Current coach: Finland
- Coached for: Espoo Blues; SaiPa; HK Dukla Trenčín; Västerås IK; Östersunds IK; IK Oskarshamn
- National team: Finland
- NHL draft: 232nd overall, 1994; Florida Panthers
- Playing career: 1992–2007
- Coaching career: 2011–present
Medal record
Olympic Games
Bronze medal – third place	1994 Lillehammer	Ice hockey
World Championship
Gold medal – first place	1995 Sweden

Tero Juhani Lehterä (born 21 April 1972) is a Finnish ice hockey coach and former professional ice hockey player. The majority of his playing career was spent with teams in the SM-liiga. He has served as head coach of the Finnish women's national team since May 2025.

== Playing career ==
Lehterä played with Tappara, Jokerit, HPK, and Espoo Blues in Finland. He also had stints in the Swedish Elitserien, the North American IHL, the Russian Superleague, the Swiss NLA, the German DEL, and the Danish Superisligaen.

As a member of the Finnish national team, he won a bronze medal in the ice hockey tournament at the 1994 Winter Olympics, and a gold medal at the Ice Hockey World Championship in 1995.

== Coaching career ==
Lehterä switched into coaching after retiring from professional play in 2007. He has been the head coach of SaiPa of the Finnish Liiga. He has also coached several Espoo Blues junior teams and worked as an assistant coach for Blues' first team during the 2015-16 season. He was supposed to become the head coach of Blues, but the team went bankrupt in 2016.

During the 2022–23 season of HockeyAllsvenskan he took over mid-season as head coach for Västerås IK after the team had a rough start and hadn't met the high expectations that the relatively high-end lineup had amassed. Lehterä succeeded in taking the team to the quarterfinals where they lost to Björklöven IF. Tero became known as "Tero the Hero" amongst the Västerås fanbase and many people still hope for his return. One of the main reasons for the instant improvement in play for Västerås was his use of neutral zone trap play.

During the 2023–24 HockeyAllsvenskan season he coached Östersunds IK and cemented his finish style of trap play in HockeyAllsvenskan.

Lehterä was announced as the new head coach of the Finnish women's national team in May 2025, succeeding Juuso Toivola, who had held the role during the previous three seasons. Lehterä had no experience coaching women prior to accepting the position and shared that he was "not very well informed about women's ice hockey" in an interview following the hiring announcement. Lehterä was also coaching the Finnish team at the 2026 Winter Olympics in Women's ice hockey tournament.

== Personal life ==
Lehterä has also worked as a television ice hockey analyst for MTV3 and Nelonen.

His nephew, Jori Lehterä, was drafted by the St. Louis Blues and also played for the Philadelphia Flyers. His daughter, Nea Lehterä, was in the winning team in the cheerleading world championships in 2022.

== Career statistics ==
=== Regular season and playoffs ===
			Regular season					Playoffs
Season	Team	League	GP	G	A	Pts	PIM	GP	G	A	Pts	PIM
1989–90	Kiekko-Espoo	FIN U20	28	14	26	40	2	5	3	1	4	0
1989–90	Kiekko-Espoo	FIN.2	7	2	2	4	0	—	—	—	—	—
1990–91	Kiekko-Espoo	FIN U20	4	0	3	3	4	—	—	—	—	—
1990–91	Kiekko-Espoo	FIN.2	34	17	14	31	2	—	—	—	—	—
1991–92	Kiekko-Espoo	FIN U20	7	6	8	14	0	—	—	—	—	—
1991–92	Kiekko-Espoo	FIN.2	41	23	33	56	10	5	2	2	4	0
1992–93	Kiekko-Espoo	FIN U20	4	1	7	8	0	—	—	—	—	—
1992–93	Kiekko-Espoo	SM-l	47	17	14	31	4	—	—	—	—	—
1993–94	Kiekko-Espoo	SM-l	48	19	27	46	2	—	—	—	—	—
1994–95	Malmö IF	SEL	37	12	11	23	10	9	0	0	0	0
1995–96	Jokerit	SM-l	48	11	12	23	27	11	2	5	7	2
1996–97	Jokerit	SM-l	47	11	10	21	4	9	2	3	5	0
1997–98	Kiekko-Espoo	SM-l	47	9	13	22	4	8	1	1	2	0
1998–99	Fort Wayne Komets	IHL	69	15	24	39	8	2	0	1	1	0
1999–2000	Jokerit	SM-l	52	11	11	22	6	11	4	2	6	0
2000–01	Tappara	SM-l	55	6	17	23	20	10	1	5	6	0
2001–02	Espoo Blues	SM-l	50	6	13	19	6	2	0	0	0	0
2002–03	HPK	SM-l	55	7	8	15	2	13	1	4	5	2
2003–04	Neftekhimik Nizhnekamsk	RSL	55	16	11	27	8	5	0	1	1	2
2004–05	Neftekhimik Nizhnekamsk	RSL	23	2	5	7	2	—	—	—	—	—
2004–05	HC Salamat	FIN.2	3	0	0	0	0	—	—	—	—	—
2004–05	Torpedo Nizhny Novgorod	VHL	17	3	3	6	0	—	—	—	—	—
2005–06	EHC Basel	NLA	18	1	6	7	6	—	—	—	—	—
2005–06	Füchse Duisburg	DEL	5	0	0	0	4	—	—	—	—	—
2006–07	HC Ambrì-Piotta	NLA	3	0	1	1	0	—	—	—	—	—
2006–07	Odense Bulldogs	DNK	13	1	1	2	0	6	1	1	2	0
SM-l totals			449	94	128	222	75	64	11	20	31	4

=== International ===
Year	Team	Event	GP	G	A	Pts	PIM
1990	Finland	EJC	6	3	3	6	0
1991	Finland	WJC	6	0	3	3	2
1992	Finland	WJC	6	2	0	2	0
1994	Finland	OG	4	0	1	1	0
1995	Finland	WC	8	1	0	1	0
Junior totals			18	5	6	11	2
Senior totals			12	1	1	2	0
