= Lasse Pirjetä =

Finnish ice hockey player

- Born: April 4, 1974 (age 52) Oulu, Finland
- Height: 6 ft 4 in (193 cm)
- Weight: 225 lb (102 kg; 16 st 1 lb)
- Position: Centre
- Shot: Left
- Played for: TPS; Frölunda HC; Tappara; HIFK; Kärpät; Columbus Blue Jackets; Pittsburgh Penguins; Kloten Flyers; Malmö Redhawks; Pelicans
- National team: Finland
- NHL draft: 133rd overall, 2002; Columbus Blue Jackets
- Playing career: 1991–2009

Lasse Pirjetä (born April 4, 1974) is a Finnish former professional ice hockey forward. He represented several teams in the Finnish SM-liiga, Frölunda HC in the Swedish Elitserien and the Columbus Blue Jackets and Pittsburgh Penguins in the NHL.

== Playing career ==
Pirjetä spent the majority of his first nine years of his professional career playing in his native Finnish league the SM-Liiga. After nominating, Pirjetä was selected by the Columbus Blue Jackets as their fifth-round pick, 133rd overall, in the 2002 NHL entry draft, as an overage draftee. Pirjetä made the jump to the NHL immediately in 2002–03 season with the Blue Jackets, appearing in 51 games with a solid 21 points. In the following 2003–04 season, Pirjetä struggled to maintain his form from his debut season and was traded by the Blue Jackets, to the Pittsburgh Penguins, for Brian Holzinger on March 10, 2004.

After starting the 2005–06 season with Pittsburgh, he was sent down to the Penguins' AHL team, the Wilkes-Barre/Scranton Penguins on December 15, 2005. After playing only 8 games with Wilkes-Barre on January 20, Pirjetä returned to Europe to play for the Kloten Flyers in the Swiss NLA.

== Career statistics ==
=== Regular season and playoffs ===
| | | | Regular season | | | | | Playoffs |
| Season | Team | League | GP | G | A | Pts | PIM | GP | G | A | Pts | PIM |
|---|---|---|---|---|---|---|---|---|---|---|---|---|
| 1989–90 | Kärpät | FIN U20 | 1 | 0 | 0 | 0 | 0 | — | — | — | — | — |
| 1990–91 | Kärpät | FIN U20 | 43 | 9 | 9 | 18 | 14 | 11 | 4 | 0 | 4 | 2 |
| 1991–92 | Kärpät | FIN–2 | 2 | 0 | 0 | 0 | 0 | — | — | — | — | — |
| 1991–92 | Tacoma Rockets | WHL | 16 | 5 | 2 | 7 | 4 | — | — | — | — | — |
| 1992–93 | Kärpät | FIN U20 | 24 | 13 | 19 | 32 | 34 | — | — | — | — | — |
| 1992–93 | Kärpät | FIN–2 | 20 | 4 | 3 | 7 | 6 | — | — | — | — | — |
| 1993–94 | Kärpät | FIN U20 | 6 | 2 | 2 | 4 | 2 | 4 | 6 | 2 | 8 | 8 |
| 1993–94 | TPS | SM-l | 43 | 9 | 9 | 18 | 14 | 11 | 4 | 0 | 4 | 2 |
| 1993–94 | Kiekko–67 | FIN–2 | 2 | 2 | 1 | 3 | 0 | — | — | — | — | — |
| 1994–95 | TPS | FIN U20 | 1 | 0 | 0 | 0 | 0 | — | — | — | — | — |
| 1994–95 | TPS | SM-l | 49 | 7 | 13 | 20 | 64 | 8 | 0 | 1 | 1 | 29 |
| 1995–96 | TPS | SM-l | 45 | 13 | 14 | 27 | 34 | 11 | 6 | 3 | 9 | 4 |
| 1996–97 | Frölunda HC | SEL | 50 | 14 | 8 | 22 | 36 | 3 | 0 | 1 | 1 | 4 |
| 1997–98 | Tappara | SM-l | 48 | 24 | 22 | 46 | 20 | 4 | 1 | 1 | 2 | 2 |
| 1998–99 | Tappara | SM-l | 54 | 22 | 19 | 41 | 32 | — | — | — | — | — |
| 1999–00 | HIFK | SM-l | 54 | 18 | 25 | 43 | 24 | 9 | 2 | 3 | 5 | 10 |
| 2000–01 | HIFK | SM-l | 56 | 15 | 18 | 33 | 20 | — | — | — | — | — |
| 2001–02 | Kärpät | SM-l | 55 | 15 | 26 | 41 | 24 | 4 | 2 | 2 | 4 | 2 |
| 2002–03 | Columbus Blue Jackets | NHL | 51 | 11 | 10 | 21 | 12 | — | — | — | — | — |
| 2003–04 | Columbus Blue Jackets | NHL | 57 | 2 | 8 | 10 | 20 | — | — | — | — | — |
| 2003–04 | Syracuse Crunch | AHL | 5 | 1 | 2 | 3 | 2 | — | — | — | — | — |
| 2003–04 | Pittsburgh Penguins | NHL | 13 | 6 | 6 | 12 | 0 | — | — | — | — | — |
| 2004–05 | HIFK | SM-l | 45 | 16 | 20 | 36 | 26 | 5 | 2 | 0 | 2 | 2 |
| 2005–06 | Pittsburgh Penguins | NHL | 25 | 4 | 3 | 7 | 18 | — | — | — | — | — |
| 2005–06 | Wilkes–Barre/Scranton Penguins | AHL | 8 | 1 | 4 | 5 | 6 | — | — | — | — | — |
| 2005–06 | Kloten Flyers | NLA | 7 | 1 | 2 | 3 | 2 | 9 | 0 | 2 | 2 | 2 |
| 2006–07 | Malmö Redhawks | SEL | 54 | 10 | 16 | 26 | 44 | — | — | — | — | — |
| 2007–08 | Malmö Redhawks | SWE–2 | 4 | 4 | 2 | 6 | 2 | 10 | 3 | 5 | 8 | 6 |
| 2008–09 | Pelicans | SM-l | 7 | 0 | 1 | 1 | 4 | — | — | — | — | — |
| SM-l totals | | | 456 | 139 | 167 | 306 | 260 | 52 | 17 | 10 | 27 | 51 |
| NHL totals | | | 146 | 23 | 27 | 50 | 50 | — | — | — | — | — |

=== International ===
| Year | Team | Event | GP | G | A | Pts | PIM |
|---|---|---|---|---|---|---|---|
| 1992 | Finland | EJC | 5 | 1 | 3 | 4 | 2 |
| 2002 | Finland | WC | 7 | 0 | 0 | 0 | 0 |
| 2003 | Finland | WC | 7 | 1 | 0 | 1 | 0 |
| 2004 | Finland | WC | 7 | 3 | 0 | 3 | 2 |
| Junior totals | | | 5 | 1 | 3 | 4 | 2 |
| Senior totals | | | 21 | 4 | 0 | 4 | 2 |
