= Rami Alanko =

Finnish ice hockey player

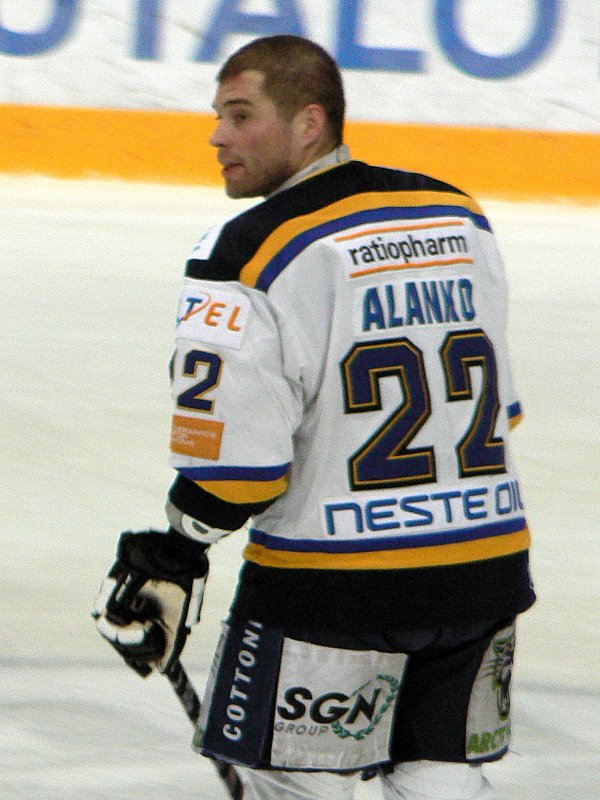
- Born: 31 December 1975 (age 49); Helsinki, Finland
- Height: 6 ft 0.5 in (184 cm)
- Weight: 183 lb (83 kg; 13 st 1 lb)
- Position: Defence
- Shot: Right
- Played for: Haukat; HPK; Jokerit; EHC Kloten; Espoo Blues; Färjestad BK; Frankfurt Lions
- National team: Finland
- Playing career: 1995–2010

Rami Alanko (born 31 December 1975) is a Finnish former professional ice hockey player.

He is former hockey player for the Espoo Blues in the Finnish SM-liiga. He joined the club in May 2007. He started his career in 1995 and has played with several Finnish clubs including HPK, Espoo Blues, Jokerit and Haukat. With Jokerit Alanko won Finnish championship and Continental Cup. He has also played a short stint in Switzerland for Kloten Flyers in 1997. He played with Swedish club Färjestad BK between 2005 and November 2006, during that time he won the Swedish Championship with them in April 2006. When he left Färjestad he signed with German club Frankfurt Lions and played with them until the end of the 2006/07 season. He then moved back home to Finland and signed for Espoo Blues. In August 2008, the Dutch continued to contract until spring 2011. He represented the Blues during the period 2008-2009 in the Champions League. Netherlands during the period was twice kuitekin bad concussion. He was awarded for the third year in a concussion for the period 2009-2010, however, in the second match against carp Oulu, when Mikko Alikoski tackled Alanko rules against the side. The match was the last of Alanko's career.

== Career statistics ==
			Regular season					Playoffs
Season	Team	League	GP	G	A	Pts	PIM	GP	G	A	Pts	PIM
1992–93	Jokerit U20	U20 I-Divisioona	8	2	2	4	6	—	—	—	—	—
1993–94	Jokerit U20	U20 SM-liiga	34	2	5	7	14	—	—	—	—	—
1994–95	Jokerit U20	U20 SM-liiga	22	3	3	6	61	—	—	—	—	—
1995–96	Jokerit U20	U20 SM-liiga	27	5	5	10	55	7	0	2	2	12
1995–96	Haukat	I-Divisioona	6	0	0	0	31	—	—	—	—	—
1996–97	HPK	SM-liiga	47	0	7	7	65	10	0	0	0	12
1997–98	Jokerit	SM-liiga	6	0	0	0	29	—	—	—	—	—
1997–98	EHC Kloten	NLA	3	1	0	1	4	—	—	—	—	—
1997–98	HPK	SM-liiga	18	3	1	4	16	—	—	—	—	—
1998–99	Jokerit	SM-liiga	52	1	4	5	54	3	0	0	0	6
1999–00	Jokerit	SM-liiga	45	2	1	3	34	11	0	0	0	10
2000–01	Jokerit	SM-liiga	56	4	6	10	40	5	0	0	0	0
2001–02	Jokerit	SM-liiga	32	1	2	3	18	6	0	0	0	29
2002–03	Espoo Blues	SM-liiga	54	4	6	10	64	7	0	2	2	6
2003–04	Espoo Blues	SM-liiga	53	7	5	12	38	8	1	1	2	2
2004–05	Espoo Blues	SM-liiga	50	1	7	8	26	—	—	—	—	—
2005–06	Färjestad BK	Elitserien	41	2	6	8	67	11	1	0	1	10
2006–07	Färjestad BK	Elitserien	18	0	2	2	20	—	—	—	—	—
2006–07	Frankfurt Lions	DEL	24	0	2	2	73	8	1	0	1	22
2007–08	Espoo Blues	SM-liiga	45	3	11	14	46	17	0	0	0	6
2008–09	Espoo Blues	SM-liiga	46	2	6	8	26	14	0	2	2	10
2009–10	Espoo Blues	SM-liiga	2	0	0	0	0	—	—	—	—	—
SM-liiga totals			506	28	56	84	456	81	1	5	6	81
