= Juha Ikonen =

Finnish ice hockey player

- Born: June 7, 1970 (age 55) Helsinki, FIN
- Height: 5 ft 10 in (178 cm)
- Weight: 189 lb (86 kg; 13 st 7 lb)
- Position: Right wing
- Shot: Left
- Played for: Espoo Blues; Västra Frölunda HC
- National team: Finland
- Playing career: 1988–2002

Juha Ikonen (born June 7, 1970) is a Finnish former professional ice hockey player, who last played in 2002.

Ikonen played in the SM-liiga for Espoo Blues and in the Elitserien for Västra Frölunda HC. He also played for Finland in the 1998 World Ice Hockey Championship.

== Career statistics ==
			Regular season					Playoffs
Season	Team	League	GP	G	A	Pts	PIM	GP	G	A	Pts	PIM
1988–89	Kiekko-Espoo	I-Divisioona	43	12	15	27	18	—	—	—	—	—
1989–90	Kiekko-Espoo	I-Divisioona	38	12	14	26	14	—	—	—	—	—
1990–91	GrlFK	I-Divisioona	37	6	13	19	2	—	—	—	—	—
1991–92	HJK	I-Divisioona	41	15	27	42	8	—	—	—	—	—
1992–93	HJK	I-Divisioona	24	11	22	33	18	—	—	—	—	—
1992–93	Kiekko-Espoo	SM-liiga	18	5	3	8	4	—	—	—	—	—
1993–94	Kiekko-Espoo	SM-liiga	48	9	15	24	12	—	—	—	—	—
1994–95	Kiekko-Espoo	SM-liiga	50	13	22	35	46	4	1	2	3	2
1995–96	Kiekko-Espoo	SM-liiga	49	11	18	29	44	—	—	—	—	—
1996–97	Kiekko-Espoo	SM-liiga	50	14	24	38	48	4	1	0	1	6
1997–98	Kiekko-Espoo	SM-liiga	48	8	27	35	34	8	2	4	6	0
1998–99	Espoo Blues	SM-liiga	52	11	34	45	44	4	1	1	2	4
1999–00	Västra Frölunda HC	Elitserien	49	12	20	32	38	5	1	2	3	4
2000–01	Västra Frölunda HC	Elitserien	50	12	21	33	36	4	0	1	1	25
2001–02	Västra Frölunda HC	Elitserien	6	0	1	1	2	10	0	0	0	4
SM-liiga totals			315	71	143	214	232	20	5	7	12	12
Elitserien totals			105	24	42	66	76	19	1	3	4	33
I-Divisioona totals			183	56	91	147	60	—	—	—	—	—
