= Arto Laatikainen =

Finnish ice hockey player

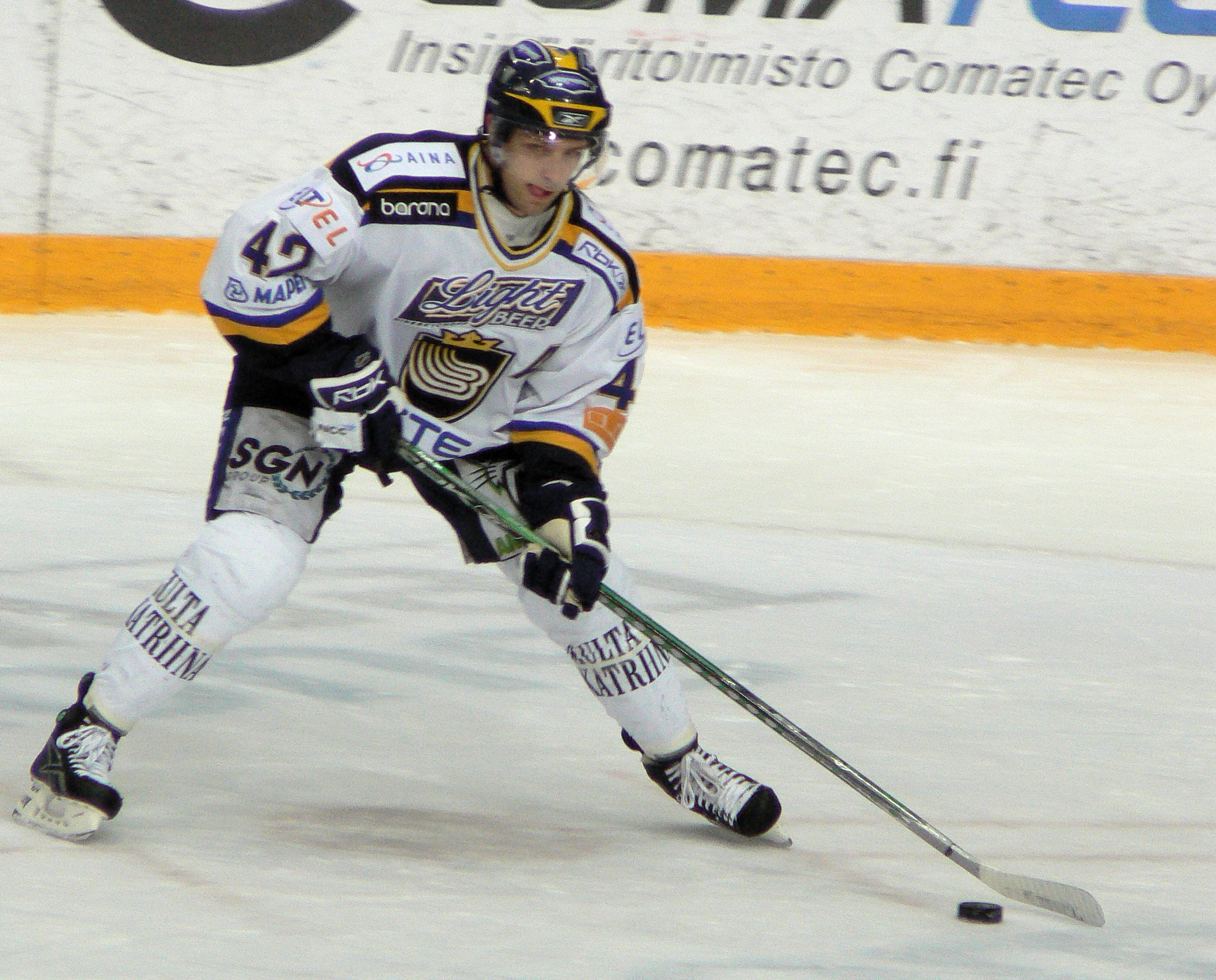
- Born: May 24, 1980 (age 45) Espoo, Finland
- Height: 5 ft 11 in (180 cm)
- Weight: 187 lb (85 kg; 13 st 5 lb)
- Position: Defence
- Shoots: Left
- Liiga team Former teams: Oulun Kärpät; Espoo Blues; Färjestad BK; Södertälje SK; JYP Jyväskylä
- National team: Finland
- NHL draft: 197th overall, 1999; New York Rangers
- Playing career: 1998–present

Arto Markus Laatikainen (born May 24, 1980) is a Finnish professional ice hockey defenceman. He is currently playing with HPK of the Finnish Liiga. Laatikainen was selected by the New York Rangers in the 7th round (197th overall) of the 1999 NHL entry draft.

Laatikainen played the 2013–14 season for hometown club, Espoo Blues in the Liiga. He played 614 league games for Espoo Blues, which is more than any other player ever played for the team.

== Notable awards and honours ==
- 2007-08: Pekka Rautakallio trophy for best defenceman of the season in the SM-liiga

== Career statistics ==
=== Regular season and playoffs ===
			Regular season					Playoffs
Season	Team	League	GP	G	A	Pts	PIM	GP	G	A	Pts	PIM
1996–97	Kiekko-Espoo	FIN U18	11	2	5	7	2	—	—	—	—	—
1996–97	Kiekko-Espoo	FIN U20	34	2	9	11	34	—	—	—	—	—
1997–98	Kiekko-Espoo	FIN U18	7	2	1	3	6	—	—	—	—	—
1997–98	Kiekko-Espoo	FIN U20	35	7	9	16	24	5	2	0	2	2
1998–99	Blues	FIN U20	3	0	1	1	4	1	1	1	2	0
1998–99	Blues	SM-l	48	0	6	6	14	4	0	2	2	2
1999–2000	Blues	FIN U20	1	0	0	0	2	—	—	—	—	—
1999–2000	Blues	SM-l	51	6	5	11	12	4	1	0	1	4
2000–01	Blues	SM-l	54	5	9	14	38	—	—	—	—	—
2000–01	Haukat	FIN.2	1	1	1	2	0	—	—	—	—	—
2001–02	Blues	SM-l	56	5	6	11	32	3	0	0	0	0
2002–03	Blues	SM-l	51	1	8	9	24	7	0	3	3	4
2003–04	Blues	SM-l	55	4	20	24	30	—	—	—	—	—
2004–05	Blues	SM-l	56	7	8	15	32	—	—	—	—	—
2005–06	Blues	SM-l	54	6	19	25	69	9	3	5	8	8
2006–07	Blues	SM-l	52	6	21	27	50	9	2	2	4	10
2007–08	Blues	SM-l	52	13	25	38	53	17	2	9	11	18
2008–09	Färjestad BK	SEL	39	2	14	16	18	9	0	2	2	6
2009–10	Färjestad BK	SEL	38	1	11	12	18	6	1	1	2	4
2010–11	Södertälje SK	SEL	54	6	16	22	28	—	—	—	—	—
2011–12	JYP	SM-l	47	5	17	22	46	14	0	4	4	4
2012–13	Blues	Liiga	36	2	8	10	18	—	—	—	—	—
2012–13	HC Keski-Uusimaa	FIN.2	2	0	0	0	0	—	—	—	—	—
2013–14	Blues	Liiga	49	4	10	14	51	7	0	3	3	4
2014–15	TPS	Liiga	5	0	0	0	4	—	—	—	—	—
2014–15	Kärpät	Liiga	42	6	17	23	18	19	0	17	17	20
2015–16	Kärpät	Liiga	50	3	13	16	10	13	1	4	5	6
2016–17	Ilves	Liiga	47	1	11	12	36	10	0	2	2	2
2017–18	Ilves	Liiga	40	0	6	6	28	—	—	—	—	—
2018–19	HPK	Liiga	55	2	13	15	14	15	3	4	7	27
SM-l/Liiga totals			900	76	222	298	579	131	12	55	67	109
SEL totals			131	9	41	50	64	15	1	3	4	10

=== International ===
Year	Team	Event	GP	G	A	Pts	PIM
1997	Finland	U17	3	1	0	1	4
1998	Finland	EJC	6	3	2	5	6
1999	Finland	WJC	6	0	2	2	6
2000	Finland	WJC	7	0	2	2	2
Junior totals			22	4	6	10	18
