= Erkki Rajamäki =

Finnish ice hockey player and scout

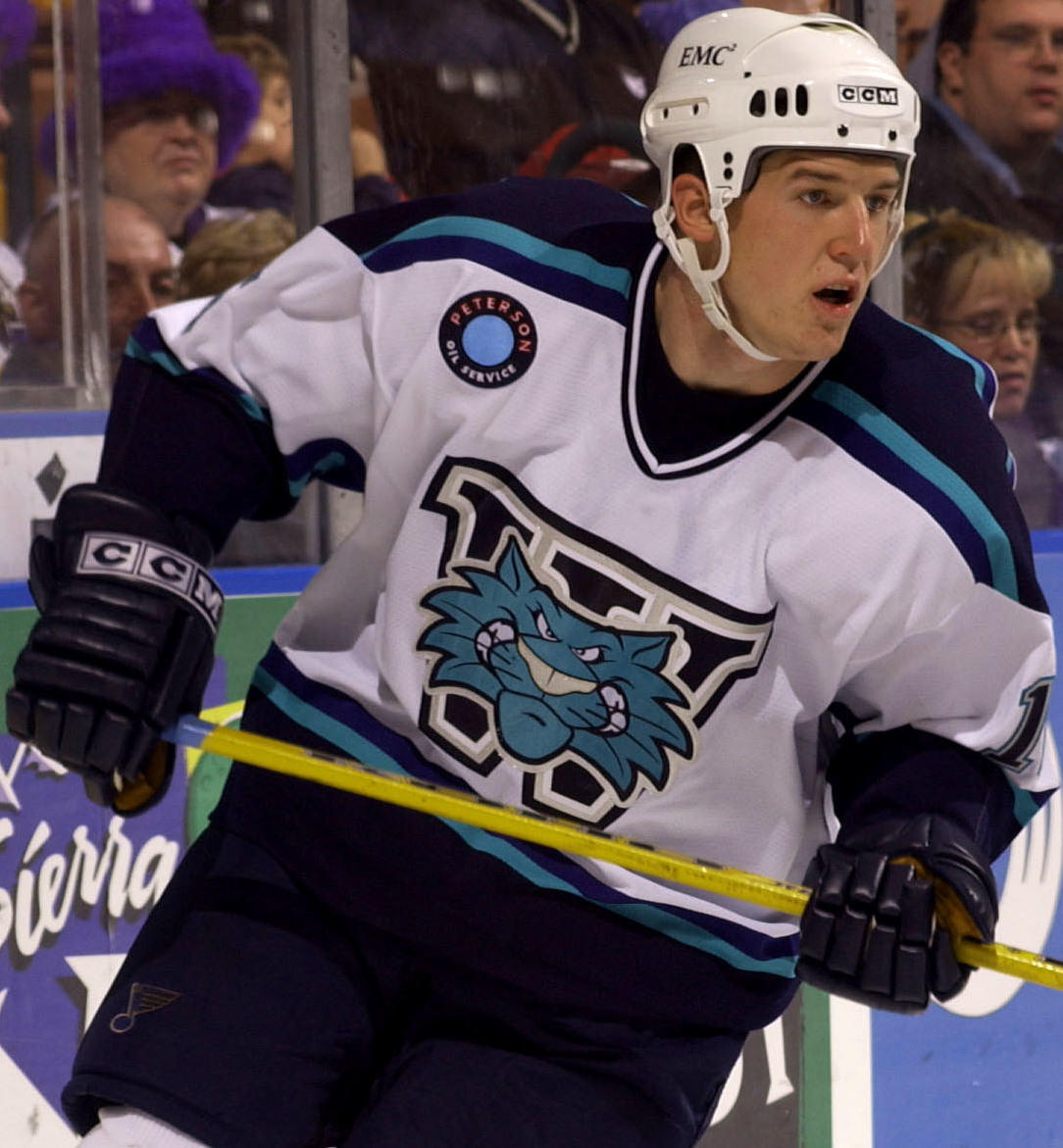
- Rajamäki with the Worcester IceCats during the 2004-05 season
- Born: October 30, 1978 (age 46); Vantaa, Finland
- Height: 6 ft 2 in (188 cm)
- Weight: 213 lb (97 kg; 15 st 3 lb)
- Position: Left wing
- Shot: Left
- Played for: HIFK; HPK; Ilves; Espoo Blues
- National team: Finland
- NHL draft: 216th overall, 1999; Tampa Bay Lightning
- Playing career: 1998–2013

Erkki Rajamäki (born October 30, 1978) is a Finnish former professional ice hockey left winger and currently the director of hockey operations for HPK of the Liiga. He was previously an amateur scout for the Pittsburgh Penguins from 2013 to 2015 and the Boston Bruins from 2015 to 2020.

== Career statistics ==
=== Regular season and playoffs ===
			Regular season					Playoffs
Season	Team	League	GP	G	A	Pts	PIM	GP	G	A	Pts	PIM
1998–99	HIFK	SM-liiga	14	0	0	0	2	—	—	—	—	—
1999–00	Colgate University	ECAC	31	1	6	7	20	—	—	—	—	—
2000–01	HIFK	SM-liiga	50	1	2	3	10	5	0	0	0	2
2000–01	Newcastle Jesters	ISL	11	1	0	1	0	—	—	—	—	—
2001–02	HPK	SM-liiga	56	12	7	19	75	8	1	2	3	2
2002–03	HPK	SM-liiga	40	4	3	7	100	10	1	0	1	36
2003–04	Ilves	SM-liiga	43	12	6	18	89	5	0	0	0	0
2004–05	Worcester IceCats	AHL	60	5	4	9	67	—	—	—	—	—
2005–06	Peoria Rivermen	AHL	1	0	0	0	0	—	—	—	—	—
2005–06	Utah Grizzlies	ECHL	5	1	1	2	2	—	—	—	—	—
2005–06	Blues	SM-liiga	24	1	3	4	100	8	0	1	1	28
2006–07	Blues	SM-liiga	45	1	3	4	131	9	0	2	2	6
2007–08	Blues	SM-liiga	49	16	12	28	118	17	4	2	6	14
2008–09	Blues	SM-liiga	31	11	3	14	126	14	1	0	1	18
2009–10	Blues	SM-liiga	53	15	8	23	124	3	0	0	0	0
2011–12	HIFK	SM-liiga	23	4	0	4	78	1	0	0	0	0
2012–13	Ilves	SM-liiga	47	5	2	7	100	5	1	0	1	2
SM-liiga totals			475	82	49	131	1053	85	8	7	15	108
