= Ville Viitaluoma =

Finnish ice kockey player

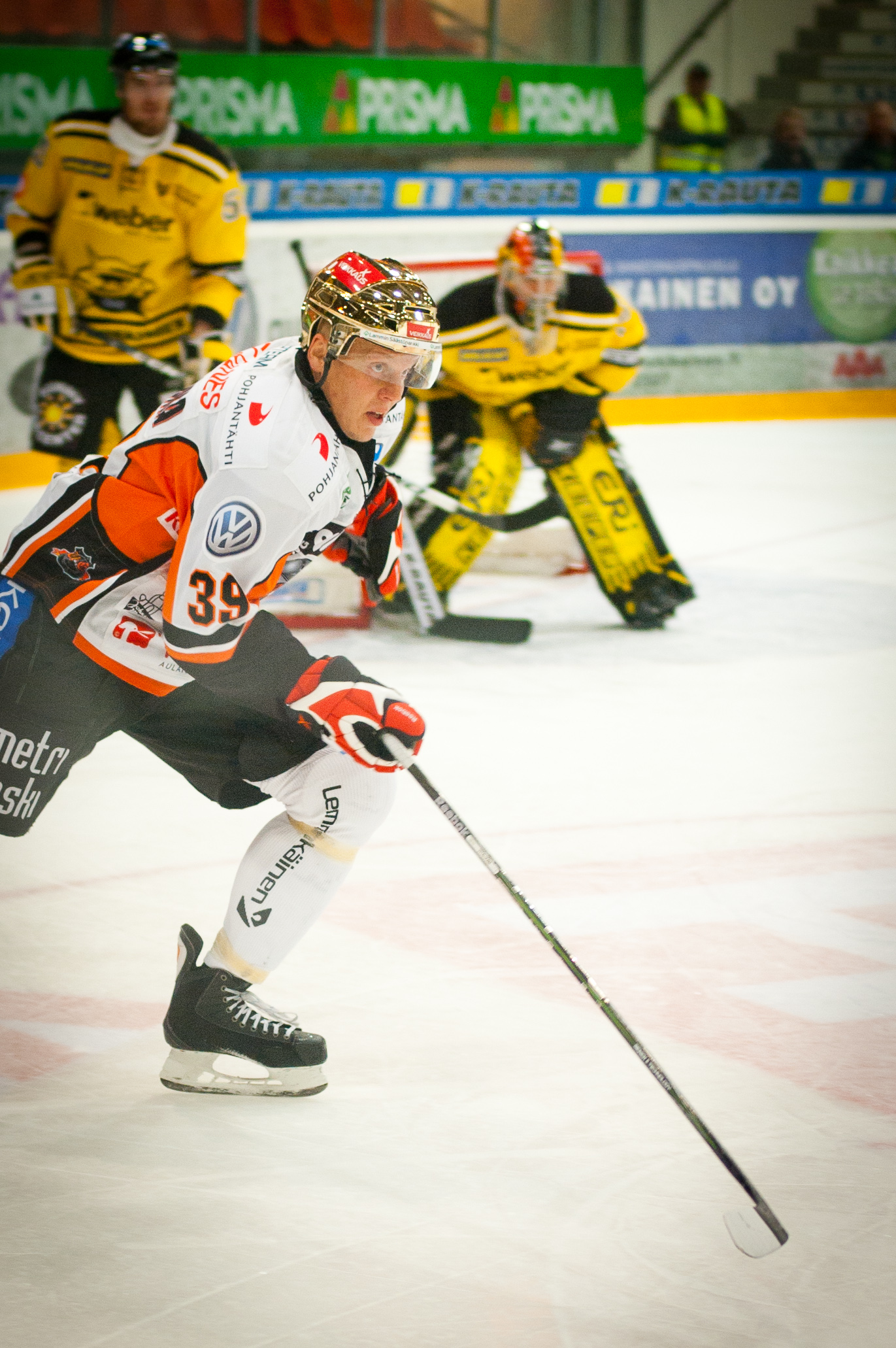
- Born: February 16, 1981; Espoo, Finland
- Height: 6 ft 0 in (183 cm)
- Weight: 187 lb (85 kg; 13 st 5 lb)
- Position: Centre
- Shoots: Left
- SM-liiga team Former teams: Vaasan Sport; HPK
- National team: Finland
- NHL draft: Undrafted
- Playing career: 2000–present

Ville Viitaluoma (born February 16, 1981) is a Finnish professional ice hockey forward who currently plays for Vaasan Sport of the SM-liiga.

== Career statistics ==
			Regular season					Playoffs
Season	Team	League	GP	G	A	Pts	PIM	GP	G	A	Pts	PIM
1996–97	Kiekko-Vantaa U16	U16 SM-sarja	30	10	11	21	76	—	—	—	—	—
1996–97	Kiekko-Vantaa U20	U20 I-Divisioona	4	3	1	4	2	—	—	—	—	—
1997–98	HIFK U18	U18 SM-sarja	29	1	3	4	24	—	—	—	—	—
1997–98	HIFK U20	U20 SM-liiga	1	0	0	0	0	—	—	—	—	—
1998–99	HIFK U18	U18 SM-sarja	33	5	11	16	58	3	0	0	0	0
1999–00	HIFK U20	U20 SM-liiga	30	11	10	21	91	3	0	0	0	0
2000–01	HIFK U20	U20 SM-liiga	37	30	47	77	65	9	3	3	6	10
2000–01	HIFK	SM-liiga	8	0	0	0	2	3	1	0	1	0
2000–01	Ahmat Hyvinkää	Mestis	1	0	0	0	0	—	—	—	—	—
2001–02	HIFK U20	U20 SM-liiga	4	3	6	9	0	5	4	3	7	4
2001–02	HIFK	SM-liiga	31	3	0	3	30	—	—	—	—	—
2001–02	KJT	Mestis	9	2	4	6	10	—	—	—	—	—
2002–03	HIFK	SM-liiga	55	8	17	25	55	4	0	0	0	4
2003–04	HIFK	SM-liiga	39	3	4	7	16	13	0	0	0	4
2003–04	Lahti Pelicans	SM-liiga	9	0	0	0	29	—	—	—	—	—
2004–05	SaiPa	SM-liiga	55	5	9	14	40	—	—	—	—	—
2005–06	SaiPa	SM-liiga	51	18	27	45	58	8	3	4	7	14
2006–07	Espoo Blues	SM-liiga	54	21	15	36	74	9	3	3	6	12
2007–08	Espoo Blues	SM-liiga	50	15	23	38	50	17	3	6	9	14
2008–09	HPK	SM-liiga	58	16	12	28	78	6	0	1	1	12
2009–10	HPK	SM-liiga	58	16	27	43	34	17	4	5	9	16
2010–11	HPK	SM-liiga	55	11	34	45	22	2	0	2	2	2
2011–12	Luleå HF	Elitserien	55	6	9	15	22	5	0	0	0	0
2012–13	HPK	SM-liiga	58	18	38	56	75	4	1	1	2	2
2013–14	HPK	Liiga	50	18	9	27	24	—	—	—	—	—
2013–14	Örebro HK	SHL	6	5	1	6	4	—	—	—	—	—
2014–15	Örebro HK	SHL	55	10	17	27	22	6	0	2	2	2
2015–16	Örebro HK	SHL	51	3	11	14	16	2	0	0	0	2
2016–17	Vaasan Sport	Liiga	55	13	17	30	28	—	—	—	—	—
2017–18	Vaasan Sport	Liiga	21	2	9	11	8	—	—	—	—	—
2017–18	HPK	Liiga	38	1	10	11	8	—	—	—	—	—
Liiga totals			745	168	251	419	631	83	15	22	37	80
SHL totals			167	24	38	62	64	13	0	2	2	4
