= Jan Långbacka =

Finnish ice hockey player

- Born: 12 April 1968 (age 57); Espoo, Finland
- Height: 5 ft 9 in (175 cm)
- Weight: 165 lb (75 kg; 11 st 11 lb)
- Position: Center
- Shot: Left
- Played for: Kiekko-Espoo; Jokerit
- Playing career: 1988–1996

Jan Långbacka (born April 12, 1968, in Espoo, Finland) is a retired professional ice hockey player who played in the SM-Liiga. He played for Espoo Blues and Jokerit. He has been captain of the Espoo Blues, who were named Kiekko-Espoo at that time, during two seasons between 1992 and 1994. He was a center.

== Career statistics ==
			Regular season					Playoffs
Season	Team	League	GP	G	A	Pts	PIM	GP	G	A	Pts	PIM
1988–89	Kiekko-Espoo U20	Jr. A SM-sarja	5	5	6	11	0	4	4	6	10	2
1988–89	Kiekko-Espoo	I-Divisioona	44	19	43	62	26	—	—	—	—	—
1988–89	PvUK	Jr. A SM-sarja	5	5	4	9	2	—	—	—	—	—
1989–90	Jokerit	SM-liiga	41	13	8	21	14	—	—	—	—	—
1990–91	Jokerit	SM-liiga	44	2	7	9	45	—	—	—	—	—
1991–92	Kiekko-Espoo	I-Divisioona	39	17	33	50	18	5	3	3	6	6
1992–93	Kiekko-Espoo	SM-liiga	46	12	20	32	24	—	—	—	—	—
1993–94	Kiekko-Espoo	SM-liiga	15	8	6	14	4	—	—	—	—	—
1994–95	Kiekko-Espoo	SM-liiga	48	9	15	24	18	4	2	0	2	4
1995–96	Kiekko-Espoo	SM-liiga	3	0	0	0	6	—	—	—	—	—
SM-liiga totals			197	44	56	100	111	4	2	0	2	4
