= Jere Lehtinen =

Finnish ice hockey player

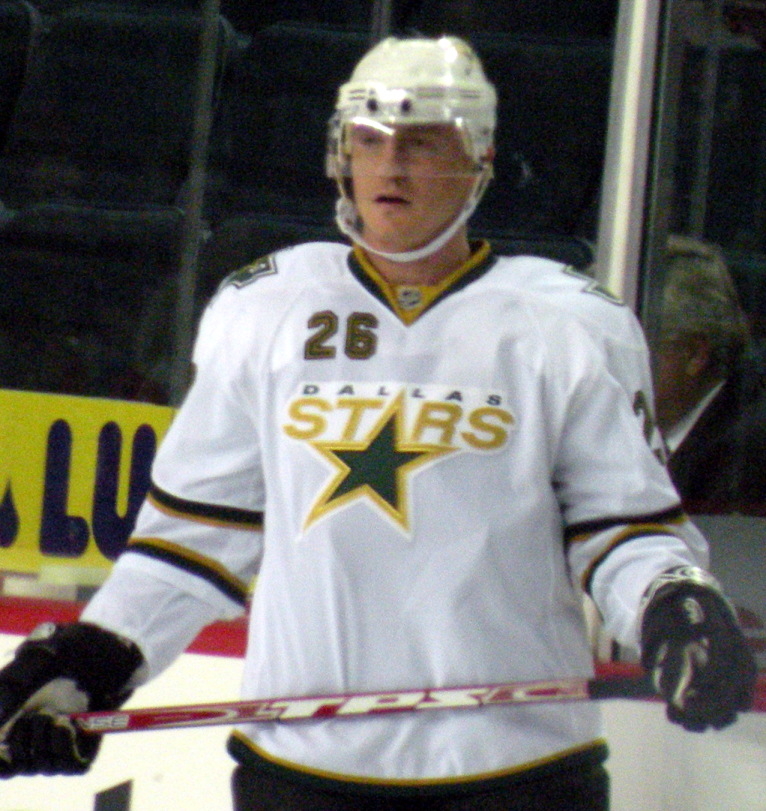
- Lehtinen with the Dallas Stars in March 2009
- Born: June 24, 1973 (age 53) Espoo, Finland
- Height: 6 ft 0 in (183 cm)
- Weight: 194 lb (88 kg; 13 st 12 lb)
- Position: Right wing
- Shot: Right
- Played for: Kiekko-Espoo; TPS; Dallas Stars
- National team: Finland
- NHL draft: 88th overall, 1992; Minnesota North Stars
- Playing career: 1990–2010
Medal record
Ice hockey
Representing Finland
Olympic Games
Silver medal – second place	2006 Turin
Bronze medal – third place	1994 Lillehammer
Bronze medal – third place	1998 Nagano
Bronze medal – third place	2010 Vancouver
World Cup
Silver medal – second place	2004 Toronto
World Championships
Gold medal – first place	1995 Sweden
Silver medal – second place	1992 Czechoslovakia
Silver medal – second place	1994 Italy
Silver medal – second place	2007 Russia

Jere Kalervo Lehtinen (born June 24, 1973) is a Finnish former professional ice hockey forward. A right winger, he was drafted in the third round, 88th overall, in the 1992 NHL entry draft by the Minnesota North Stars. Lehtinen played his entire 15-year National Hockey League (NHL) career with the organization after the franchise moved to Dallas in 1993. A two-way forward, Lehtinen is perhaps best known for his defensive responsibilities, for which he won the Frank J. Selke Trophy three times as the NHL's top defensive forward. After his retirement, he has served as the general manager of the Finnish national ice hockey team. He was inducted into the IIHF Hall of Fame in 2018.

== Playing career ==
=== Finland ===
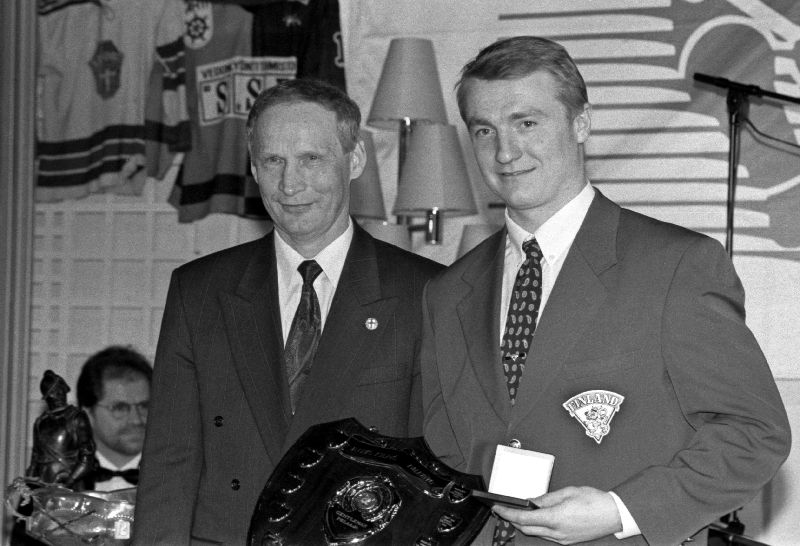
Raimo Kilpiö and Jere Lehtinen

Lehtinen played in the 1987 Quebec International Pee-Wee Hockey Tournament with a youth team from Espoo.

Lehtinen started his professional career with his hometown team, Kiekko-Espoo. The team was jammed in first division in 1991 but they managed to win the division and gained a spot in the Finnish SM-liiga, from there Lehtinen started his professional career. He spent another year with Kiekko-Espoo, but the team struggled, and after one season, Lehtinen received an offer from one of the biggest clubs in Finland at the time, TPS in Turku. He signed with TPS in the summer of 1993 and once the season started, he soon blossomed offensively. Lehtinen was immediately paired with another future NHLer, Saku Koivu, and the two formed an integral part of TPS's great season. Although they won the regular season title by a large margin, they lost to Jokerit in the finals.

The following season, TPS and Lehtinen went all the way again, this time defeating Jokerit in the final series, 3–2. After the SM-liiga season was over, Lehtinen received an invite to the 1995 World Championships. Finland progressed to the final, defeating Sweden 4–1, winning Finland's first IIHF World Championship gold medal. Lehtinen was part of the renowned Finnish top line, dubbed by Finnish fans as the "Ankkalinnan pojat" ("The boys of Duckburg," a reference to their nicknames "Tupu, Hupu, Lupu"; "Huey, Dewey, Louie") with Saku Koivu and Ville Peltonen, another future NHLer. The three also made up the tournament's all-star line.

=== Dallas Stars ===
==== 1995–2003 ====
After an impressive year in 1995, where Lehtinen won both the SM-liiga and World Championship, he went overseas to play in the NHL. He saw only one game in the minors and was part of the Dallas Stars organization instantly. Lehtinen worked his way up in three years to join Mike Modano on the team's first line and was nominated for the Frank J. Selke Trophy for the first time in 1996–97 season. During 1997–98 season, he was voted to the 1998 NHL All-Star Game. It was the first year the NHL introduced a new system in which European players play against North American players. Lehtinen's fellow countrymen Saku Koivu, Teemu Selänne and Jari Kurri were also voted to the Game. The same year, Lehtinen was again a nominee for the Selke Trophy as the best defensive forward and eventually won the prestigious award. He is the first Finnish player to have won the award. Lehtinen was also part of the bronze-winning Finnish team at the 1998 Winter Olympics in Nagano, Japan.

In 1999, the Stars progressed to the Stanley Cup Final, where they defeated the Buffalo Sabres in six games, winning the Stanley Cup. In the series, Lehtinen scored the first goal in the decisive game six, then assisted on Brett Hull's Cup-winning goal in overtime. That year, Lehtinen set career-high statistics and also captured the Selke Trophy, becoming just the third player in NHL history to win the award in consecutive seasons.

Despite the highs of the previous season, the 1999–2000 campaign was a tough one for Lehtinen. He played in only 17 regular season games due to ankle problems, fracturing it early in the season and sidelining for 30 games. After he had seemingly recovered from the injury, he returned to the lineup, but was again sidelined after playing just eight games, forcing him out of Dallas' lineup for an additional 35 games. However, he returned to help his team in the 2000 playoffs, where the Stars again progressed to the Final, but were defeated by the New Jersey Devils in six games.

Lehtinen bounced back to his old form in 2000–01 season, putting up a strong season statistics-wise. Although they again made the playoffs, the Stars, however, did not progress go as deep as they had in previous years and were dispatched in the second round by the St. Louis Blues in a four-game sweep.

In 2001–02, Lehtinen had a stellar season. Although the Stars failed to qualify for the 2002 playoffs, Lehtinen managed to score 25 goals, 24 assists and finished first on the team in plus-minus with +27. He was again voted to the NHL All-Star Game, but was unable to play due to injury. He ranked seventh in Lady Byng Memorial Trophy voting and was again nominated for the Selke Trophy, though he came in short; Michael Peca was honored with the award for second time in his career.

After an impressive 2001–02, Lehtinen continued his fine form in 2002–03. He led the Stars in goals with 31, a new career high, as well as in plus-minus (+39), which ranked fourth in the NHL. He also recorded his second career NHL hat-trick, coming against the Los Angeles Kings. Moreover, Lehtinen became only the third player in League history to win the Selke Trophy three times, tying Guy Carbonneau for three and just one behind Bob Gainey, who has won it four times.

==== 2003–2010 ====
The 2003–04 season, was a disappointment to Lehtinen, as injury problems to his knee allowed him to play just 58 games, where he scored 26 points. The Stars were knocked out by the Colorado Avalanche in the first playoff round.

Before the NHL lockout for the 2004–05 season, the World Cup of Hockey was played. Lehtinen once again represented Finland and the Finns met Canada in the final; the latter won the gold with a 3–2 win over Finland.

Lehtinen underwent knee surgery during the lockout season. After successful surgery and rehabilitation, he excelled when NHL play resumed for the 2005–06 season, tying a career-high in points (52) and setting a new career-high in goals (33). The Stars won the Pacific Division title, their seventh in past ten seasons. However, Dallas was once again eliminated in the first playoff round, again at the hands of the Colorado Avalanche. Lehtinen was again a nominee for the Selke Trophy, but ultimately finished third in voting.

The 2006 Winter Olympics in Turin took place in the middle of the 2005–06 NHL season. Lehtinen was again a vital part of Team Finland's journey to the gold medal game. Like in previous international tournaments, Lehtinen was placed in a line with Saku Koivu and Teemu Selänne. However, Finland lost the final bitterly 3–2 to their nemesis, Team Sweden. Koivu and Selänne were the tournament's joint top scorer; Lehtinen finished tied for seventh. Had Finland won the final, Lehtinen would have become the first Finn to join the Triple Gold Club.

In the 2006–07 season, Lehtinen scored 26 goals and led the team in goals for second consecutive season. The Stars, however, failed to progress from the first round of the playoffs for the third season in a row, falling to the Vancouver Canucks. Despite the series stretched to seven games, Lehtinen failed to contribute a single point for his team.

Lehtinen began the 2007–08 season strongly, posting six goals and 13 assists (19 points) in just 21 games before suffering a sports hernia. He returned on February 1, 2008, in a game against the Edmonton Oilers after a 33-game layoff. He marked his return with an assist on a Jussi Jokinen goal in the game.

Lehtinen became one of just six players in Olympic ice hockey history to win four tournament medals when Finland defeated Slovakia 5–3 at the 2010 Winter Olympics in Vancouver on February 27, 2010. Lehtinen also is one of only seven ice hockey players who have appeared in at least five Olympic games.

On December 8, 2010, Lehtinen officially announced his retirement from professional hockey, finishing with 243 goals and 271 assists and a career plus-minus rating of +176 in 875 NHL games, all with the Stars. Impressively, he never finished a season with a negative plus-minus until his final season in the NHL.

On February 11, 2017, the Stars announced that they would retire Lehtinen's No. 26 jersey in the 2017–18 season as part of their 25th anniversary in Dallas; it was retired on November 24, 2017, before the Stars' game against the Calgary Flames.

== Personal life ==
Lehtinen met his wife, Jaana, at the 1994 Olympics in Lillehammer, Norway. The two were married in June 1998 and since the ceremony was only a few days after the NHL Awards, Lehtinen was not present to accept the first Frank J. Selke Trophy of his career. The couple has twin girls, Anna and Sofia, and one son, Joel.

== Awards ==
- Played in SM-liiga All-Star Game – 1995
- Raimo Kilpiö Trophy – 1995
- Kanada-malja (Turun Palloseura) — 1995
- Ice Hockey World Championships Tournament All-Star – 1995
- NHL Rookie of the Month – February, 1996
- Stars Rookie of the Year – 1996
- Voted to the NHL All-Star Game – 1998, 2002 (didn't play due to injury)
- Frank J. Selke Trophy – 1998, 1999, 2003
- Stanley Cup champion (Dallas Stars) — 1999
- Espoo Blues #10 jersey retired – 2014
- Dallas Stars #26 jersey retired – 2017
- IIHF Hall of Fame – 2018

== Career statistics ==
=== Regular season and playoffs ===
			Regular season					Playoffs
Season	Team	League	GP	G	A	Pts	PIM	GP	G	A	Pts	PIM
1989–90	Kiekko–Espoo	FIN U20	32	23	23	46	6	5	0	3	3	0
1990–91	Kiekko–Espoo	FIN U20	3	3	1	4	0	—	—	—	—	—
1990–91	Kiekko–Espoo	FIN.2	32	15	9	24	12	—	—	—	—	—
1991–92	Kiekko–Espoo	FIN U20	8	5	4	9	2	—	—	—	—	—
1991–92	Kiekko–Espoo	FIN.2	43	32	17	49	6	5	2	4	6	2
1992–93	Kiekko–Espoo	FIN U20	4	5	3	8	8	—	—	—	—	—
1992–93	Kiekko–Espoo	SM-l	45	13	14	27	6	—	—	—	—	—
1993–94	TPS	SM-l	42	19	20	39	6	11	11	2	13	2
1994–95	TPS	SM-l	39	19	23	42	33	13	8	6	14	4
1995–96	Michigan K–Wings	IHL	1	1	0	1	0	—	—	—	—	—
1995–96	Dallas Stars	NHL	57	6	22	28	16	—	—	—	—	—
1996–97	Dallas Stars	NHL	63	16	27	43	2	7	2	2	4	0
1997–98	Dallas Stars	NHL	72	23	19	42	20	12	3	5	8	2
1998–99	Dallas Stars	NHL	74	20	32	52	18	23	10	3	13	2
1999–2000	Dallas Stars	NHL	17	3	5	8	0	13	1	5	6	2
2000–01	Dallas Stars	NHL	74	20	25	45	24	10	1	0	1	2
2001–02	Dallas Stars	NHL	73	25	24	49	14	—	—	—	—	—
2002–03	Dallas Stars	NHL	80	31	17	48	20	12	3	2	5	0
2003–04	Dallas Stars	NHL	58	13	13	26	20	5	0	0	0	0
2005–06	Dallas Stars	NHL	80	33	19	52	30	5	3	1	4	0
2006–07	Dallas Stars	NHL	73	26	17	43	16	7	0	0	0	2
2007–08	Dallas Stars	NHL	48	15	22	37	14	14	4	4	8	2
2008–09	Dallas Stars	NHL	48	8	16	24	8	—	—	—	—	—
2009–10	Dallas Stars	NHL	58	4	13	17	8	—	—	—	—	—
SM-l totals			126	51	57	108	45	24	19	8	27	6
NHL totals			875	243	271	514	210	108	27	22	49	12

=== International ===
Year	Team	Event	GP	G	A	Pts	PIM
1990	Finland	EJC	6	4	2	6	0
1991	Finland	WJC	4	2	0	2	0
1991	Finland	EJC	6	5	4	9	6
1992	Finland	WJC	7	0	2	2	2
1992	Finland	WC	7	1	1	2	0
1993	Finland	WJC	7	6	8	14	10
1994	Finland	OG	8	3	0	3	0
1994	Finland	WC	8	3	5	8	4
1995	Finland	WC	8	2	5	7	4
1996	Finland	WCH	4	2	2	4	0
1998	Finland	OG	6	4	2	6	2
2002	Finland	OG	4	1	2	3	2
2004	Finland	WCH	6	1	3	4	2
2006	Finland	OG	8	3	5	8	0
2007	Finland	WC	7	2	2	4	0
2010	Finland	OG	6	0	0	0	0
Junior totals			30	17	16	33	18
Senior totals			72	22	27	49	14

Preceded by Tero Lehterä	Winner of the Raimo Kilpiö trophy 1994–95	Succeeded by Waltteri Immonen
Preceded by Michael Peca	Winner of the Frank J. Selke Trophy; 1998, 1999	Succeeded by Steve Yzerman
Preceded by Michael Peca	Winner of the Frank J. Selke Trophy; 2003	Succeeded by Kris Draper
