= 2023–24 Mestis season =

- League: Mestis
- Sport: Ice hockey
- Duration: September 2023 – April 2024
- Number of teams: 13
- TV partner(s): C More

Regular Season
- Best record: IPK
- Runners-up: Ketterä
- Promoted to Liiga: Kiekko-Espoo
- Relegated to Suomi-sarja: FPS

Playoffs
- Champions: IPK
- Runners-up: Ketterä

Mestis seasons
- ← 2022–23 2024–25 →

The 2023–24 Mestis season was the 24th season of Mestis, the second level of ice hockey in Finland. 13 teams participated in the league. This season marked the return of Jokerit to Finnish hockey after 10 years in the KHL.

== Clubs ==
Updated 25 July 2023.

Team	City	Home arena, capacity	Founded	Head coach
FPS	Forssa	Forssa Ice Hall, 3,000	1931	(Finland) Asko Rantanen
Hermes	Kokkola	Kokkolan jäähalli, 4,200	1953	(Finland) Tuukka Poikonen
Hokki	Kajaani	Kajaanin jäähalli, 2,372	1968	(Finland) Pasi Räsänen
IPK	Iisalmi	Kankaan jäähalli, -	1966	(Finland) Niko Härkönen
Jokerit	Helsinki	Keravan jäähalli, 2,000 Helsinki Ice Hall, 8,200	1967	(Finland) Tero Määttä
JoKP	Joensuu	Mehtimäki Ice Hall, 4,800	1953	(Finland) Kari Martikainen
Kiekko-Espoo	Espoo	Espoo Metro Areena, 6,900	2018	(Finland) Tomas Westerlund
Ketterä	Imatra	Imatra Spa Areena, 1,300	1957	(Finland) Tuomo Ropo
KeuPa HT	Keuruu	Keuruun Jäähalli, 1,100	1995	(Finland) Sami Ryhänen
KOOVEE	Tampere	Tampere Ice Stadium, 7,300	1929	(Finland) Miikka Kuusela
Kiekko-Vantaa	Vantaa	Trio Areena, 3,700	1994	(Finland) Jani Manninen
RoKi	Rovaniemi	Lappi Areena, 3,500	1979	(Finland) Maso Lehtonen
TUTO Hockey	Turku	Rajupaja Areena, 3,000	1929	(Finland) Hermanni Vidman

== Team changes ==
The following team changes have happened for the 2023–24 season:

=== To Mestis ===
Promoted from Suomi-sarja

- None

Relegated from Liiga

- None as Liiga is closed

Other

- Jokerit from the KHL

=== From Mestis ===
Promoted to Liiga

- None as Liiga is closed

Relegated to Suomi-sarja

- None

Other

- HK Zemgale/LLU did not receive a license
- Peliitat went bankrupt and thus did not receive a license

== Regular season ==
The regular season consists of 48 matches.

Pos	Team	Pld	W	OTW	OTL	L	GF	GA	GD	Pts	Final Result
1	IPK	48	32	4	4	8	205	123	+82	108	Advance to Quarterfinals
2	Ketterä	48	29	5	1	13	192	115	+77	98	Advance to Quarterfinals
3	Jokerit	48	23	10	5	10	179	120	+59	94	Advance to Quarterfinals
4	K-Espoo	48	26	2	5	15	166	130	+36	87	Advance to Quarterfinals
5	TUTO Hockey	48	22	6	7	13	145	142	+3	85	Advance to Quarterfinals
6	Hermes	48	22	4	6	16	180	147	+33	80	Advance to Quarterfinals
7	JoKP	48	18	5	8	17	146	158	−12	72	Advance to Wild-card round
8	RoKi	48	18	6	5	19	165	177	−12	71	Advance to Wild-card round
9	K-Vantaa	48	19	3	7	19	164	158	+6	70	Advance to Wild-card round
10	KOOVEE	48	13	6	3	26	122	174	−52	54	Advance to Wild-card round
11	KeuPa HT	48	11	7	5	25	122	180	−58	52	
12	Hokki	48	9	4	6	29	112	166	−54	41	Qualification to relegation playoffs
13	FPS	48	5	3	3	37	95	203	−108	24	Qualification to relegation playoffs

Source: Mestis

Rules for classification: 1) Total points; 2) Goal difference; 3) Goals scored; 4) Head-to-head points; 5) Penalty minutes.

== Playoffs ==
Playoffs are being played in four stages. Wild-card round is a best-of-3 series, with the quarter-finals, the semifinals and the final being best-of-7 series. The teams are reseeded after the first two stages, so that the best team by regular season performance to make the quarter-finals and the semifinals faces the worst team in the corresponding stage.

=== Bracket ===
Wild-card round (best-of-3)
7	JoKP	2
10	KOOVEE	0
8	K-Vantaa	0
9	RoKi	2

Quarter-finals (best-of-7)
1	IPK	4
8	RoKi	2
2	Ketterä	4
7	JoKP	1
3	Jokerit	2
6	Hermes	4
4	K-Espoo	3
5	TUTO Hockey	3

Semi-finals (best-of-7)
1	IPK	4
2	Hermes	3
(Pairings are re-seeded after the first and second round)
3	Ketterä	4
4	K-Espoo	0

Finals (best-of-7)
1	IPK	4
2	Ketterä	3
Bronze medal game
3	K-Espoo	3
4	Hermes	1

== Promotion and relegation ==
=== Promotion ===
As the champion of Mestis in season 2022-23, Liiga decided to promote Kiekko-Espoo for the Liiga Season 2024-25.

=== Relegation ===
In the first round of relegation playoffs the 12th and 13th seated teams will play against each other. The loser will be relegated to the Suomi-sarja for next season.

In the second round of relegation playoffs, the winner of the first round will play against the champion of Suomi-sarja. The winner of this round will play next season in Mestis and the loser will be in Suomi-sarja.

Both 1st and 2nd rounds are played as a best-of-7 series.

1st round of relegation playoffs			2nd round of relegation playoffs
			1	Hokki (Stays in Mestis)	4
12	Hokki	4	2	Pyry (Stays in Suomi-sarja)	0
13	FPS (relegated)	1
