= 2022–23 Mestis season =

2022–23 Mestis
- League: Mestis
- Sport: Ice hockey
- Duration: September 2022 – April 2023
- Number of teams: 14
- TV partner(s): C More

Regular season
- Best record: K-Espoo
- Runners-up: Ketterä

Playoffs
- Finals champions: Kiekko-Espoo (1st Mestis title)
- Runners-up: Ketterä

Mestis seasons
- ← 2021–22 2023–24 →

The 2022–23 Mestis season was the 23rd season of Mestis, the second highest level of ice hockey in Finland after Liiga. This season there was 14 teams when the Latvian team HK Zemgale/LLU joined Mestis.

== Clubs ==
Team	City	Home arena, capacity	Founded
FPS	Forssa	Forssa Ice Hall, 3,000	1931
Hermes	Kokkola	Kokkolan jäähalli, 4,200	1953
HK Zemgale/LLU	Jelgava, Latvia	Jelgava Ice hall, 1,500	2002
Hokki	Kajaani	Kajaanin jäähalli, 2,372	1968
IPK	Iisalmi	Kankaan jäähalli, 1,358	1966
JoKP	Joensuu	PKS Areena, 4,800	1953
Ketterä	Imatra	Imatra Spa Areena, 1,200	1957
KeuPa HT	Keuruu	Keuruun Jäähalli, 1,100	1995
K-Espoo	Espoo	Espoo Metro Areena, 6,982	2018
K-Vantaa	Vantaa	Trio Areena, 2,004	1994
KOOVEE	Tampere	Tampere Ice Stadium, 7,300	1929
Peliitat	Heinola	Versowood Areena, 2,686	1984
RoKi	Rovaniemi	Lappi Areena, 3,500	1979
TUTO Hockey	Turku	Kupittaan jäähalli, 3,000	1929

== Regular season ==
Pos	Team	Pld	W	OTW	OTL	L	GF	GA	GD	Pts	Final Result
1	K-Espoo	52	36	6	2	8	222	111	+111	122	Advance to Quarterfinals
2	Ketterä	52	34	1	6	11	197	115	+82	110	Advance to Quarterfinals
3	RoKi	52	27	6	3	16	179	135	+44	96	Advance to Quarterfinals
4	Hermes	52	25	6	4	17	176	149	+27	91	Advance to Quarterfinals
5	JoKP	52	24	5	6	17	188	174	+14	88	Advance to Quarterfinals
6	IPK	52	23	5	5	19	163	153	+10	84	Advance to Quarterfinals
7	KeuPa HT	52	22	3	7	20	206	196	+10	79	Advance to Wild-card round
8	K-Vantaa	52	23	2	2	25	168	189	−21	75	Advance to Wild-card round
9	KOOVEE	52	19	5	8	20	143	179	−36	75	Advance to Wild-card round
10	TUTO Hockey	52	17	7	4	24	164	174	−10	69	Advance to Wild-card round
11	Hokki	52	15	5	4	28	163	219	−56	59	
12	HK Zemgale/LLU*	52	13	3	6	30	112	158	−46	51	
13	FPS	52	11	6	3	32	138	186	−48	48	Qualification to relegation playoffs
14	Peliitat	52	12	3	3	34	116	197	−81	45	Qualification to relegation playoffs

Rules for classification: 1) Points-per-game; 2) Goal difference; 3) Goals scored; 4) Head-to-head points; 5) Penalty minutes.

*HK Zemgale/LLU would not participate in the relegation playoffs

== Playoffs ==
Playoffs are being played in four stages. Wild-card round is a best-of-3 series, with the quarter-finals, the semifinals and the final being best-of-7 series. The teams are reseeded after the first two stages, so that the best team by regular season performance to make the quarter-finals and the semifinals faces the worst team in the corresponding stage.

Wild-card round (best-of-3)
7	KeuPa HT	0
10	TUTO Hockey	2
8	K-Vantaa	1
9	KOOVEE	2

Quarter-finals (best-of-7)
1	K-Espoo	4
8	TUTO Hockey	2
2	Ketterä	4
7	KOOVEE	0
3	RoKi	4
6	IPK	0
4	Hermes	2
5	JoKP	4

Semi-finals (best-of-7)
1	K-Espoo	4
6	JoKP	0
(Pairings are re-seeded after the first and second round)
2	Ketterä	4
4	RoKi	1

Finals (best-of-7)
1	K-Espoo	4
2	Ketterä	2
Bronze medal game
6	RoKi	1
4	JoKP	0

=== Promotion ===
None as SM-liiga is currently closed for promotion.

=== Relegation ===
For the season 2022-2023 the relegation system was changed. The relegation playoffs were done so that the last Finnish team from Mestis faced the winner of Suomi-sarja and the second last team from Mestis faced the runner-up from Suomi-sarja. The series were best-of-7 and winners of the pairs would play in Mestis in season 2023–2024.

Mestis last team	Peliitat	4
Suomi-sarja winner	Pyry	0

Mestis 2nd last team	FPS	4
Suomi-sarja runner-up	JHT	2

== Final rankings ==
Gold medal	K-Espoo
Silver medal	Ketterä
Bronze medal	RoKi
4	JoKP
5	Hermes
6	IPK
7	KOOVEE
8	TUTO Hockey
9	KeuPa HT
10	K-Vantaa
11	Hokki
12	HK Zemgale/LLU
13	FPS
14	Peliitat
