= Kiekko-Espoo =

Ice hockey club in Espoo, Finland

- Nickname: Kivikova (Finnish)
- City: Espoo, Finland
- League: Liiga
- Founded: 1984
- Home arena: Espoo Metro Areena (capacity: 6,982)
- Colours
- General manager: Kim Hirschovits (2024–25)
- Head coach: Jyrki Aho (2024–25)
- Affiliates: Porvoo Hunters; Jäähonka
- Website: kiekko-espoo.com

Franchise history
- 1984–1998: Kiekko-Espoo
- 1998–2016: Espoo Blues
- 2018–present: Kiekko-Espoo

Championships
- Mestis championship: 1 (2022–23)

Kiekko-Espoo is a Finnish professional ice hockey club founded in 2018 as a continuation of the Kiekko-Espoo team originally founded in 1984. Kiekko-Espoo men's team plays in the Liiga, where they were promoted for the 2024–25 season, and the women's team plays in the Auroraliiga, where they hold the most championships of any club.

Kiekko-Espoo's junior teams play at national league levels in U16, U18 and U20 juniors. The junior teams of Espoo Blues and Kiekko-Espoo played under Kiekko-Espoo Juniorit ry until 2014.

In 2017, Espoon Kiekkoseura and Espoon Palloseura, which split from the Espoo Blues junior organization, launched their own junior representative team and founded Kiekko-Espoo ry. The team plays in U16, U18 and U20 junior leagues under the name Kiekko-Espoo. When Espoo United collapsed in the spring of 2018, the organization decided to also establish a representative team for adults in Kiekko-Espoo. It started playing in the 2018–2019 season in the Suomi-sarja. In the 2019–2020 season, the Blues women's representative team also moved to Kiekko-Espoo.

== History ==
=== Establishment and first seasons (1984–1998) ===
The club was established in February 1984 as Kiekko-Espoo and played their first season in 1984–85 in the Finnish Second Division. In 1988, they achieved promotion to the Finnish First Division and in 1992, they celebrated their promotion to the SM-liiga by beating Joensuun Kiekkopojat with a 3–2 series win in a best-of-five format. Tero Lehterä scored the winning goal and Jere Lehtinen assisted.

Kiekko-Espoo ended its first two seasons in SM-liiga in 11th place out of 12 teams. In the 1994–95 season, the team made the playoffs for the first time, losing to Lukko in quarter-finals. In 1997–98, Kiekko-Espoo caused a huge upset by beating regular season winner TPS in the quarter-finals. Kiekko-Espoo ended the season in fourth place.

=== Name change, rebrand and bankruptcy (1998–2016) ===
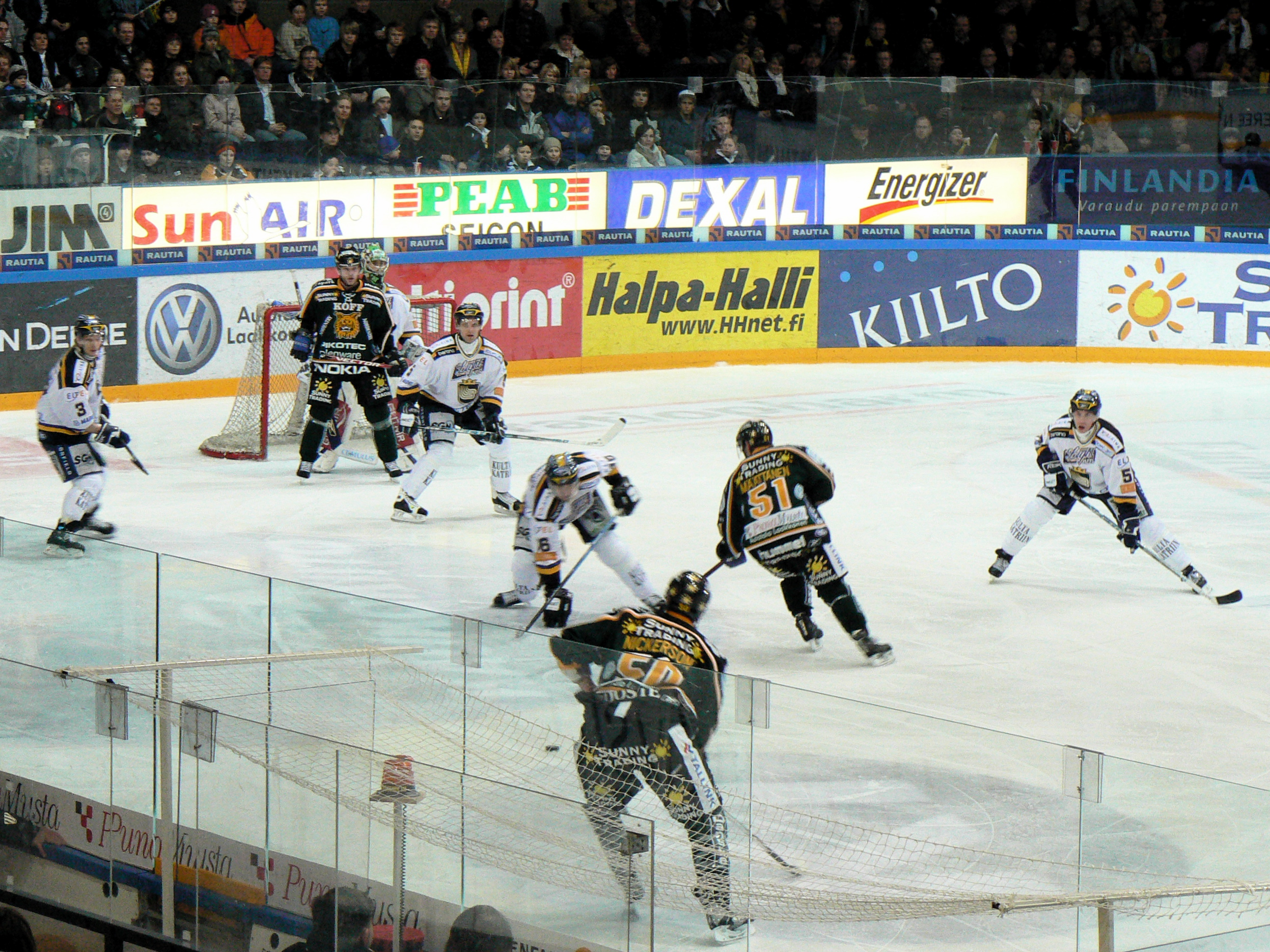
Blues against Ilves in February 2008.

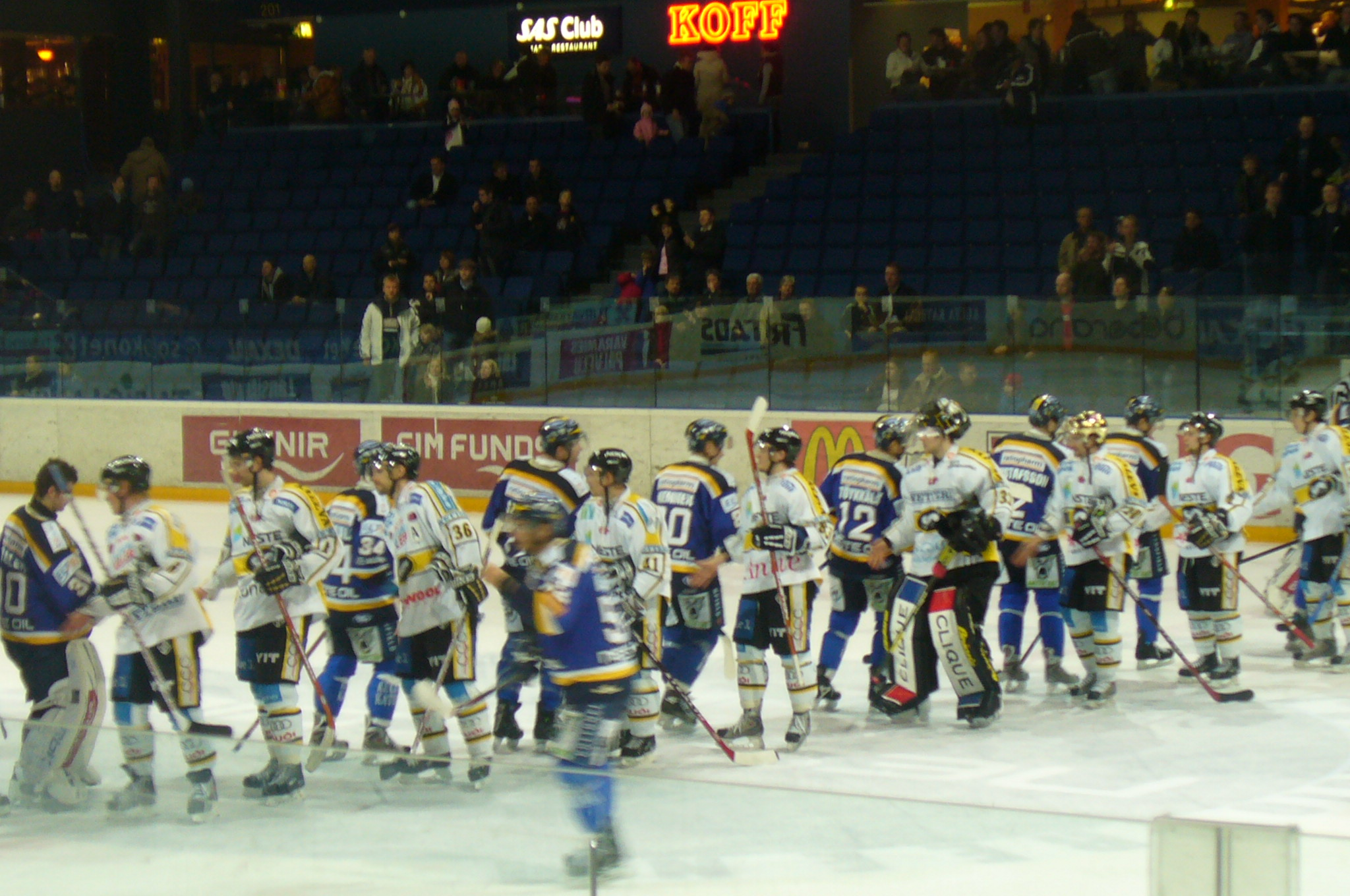
Blues met Kärpät in the 2008 SM-liiga final series.

The following summer, the team name was changed to Espoo Blues. The name came from the dominant colour of their home jersey.

During the 1998–99 season, the team moved to its current home, LänsiAuto Areena (renamed in 2009 to Barona Areena due to sponsorship change). The first seasons in their new home were difficult despite the team signing many big names. The Blues missed the playoffs in 2001 and 2005. In 2002–03, the Blues had their best regular season, finishing in fourth place, only to lose against eventual champion Tappara in overtime of the seventh quarter-final.

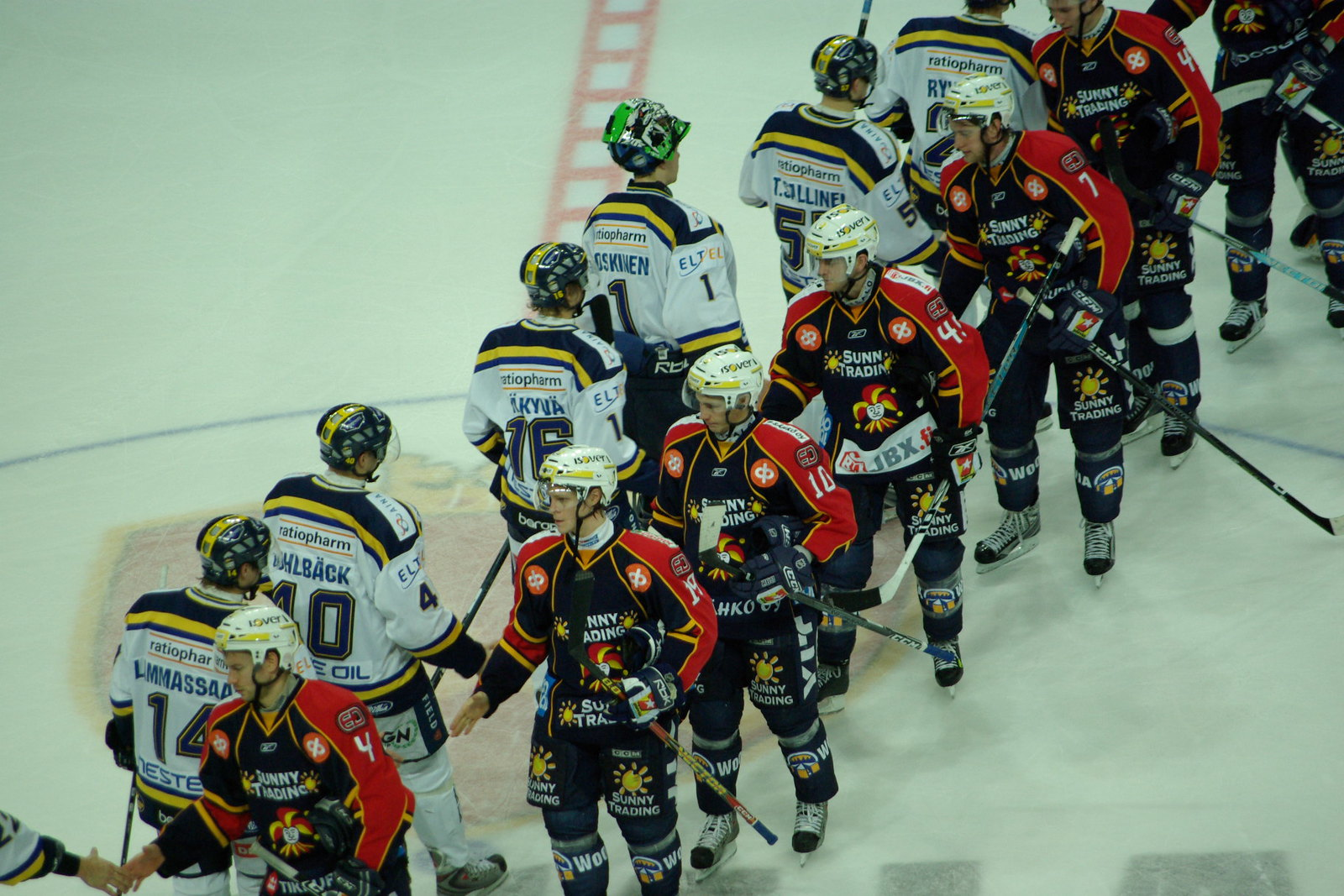
Blues against local rivals Jokerit in November 2008

The team took a step forward in 2006–07 when they reached the semi-finals for the first time, although they lost against Kärpät in three straight games, and lost the bronze medal game against HPK. During the 2007–08 season, the Blues set a new team record by winning 12 games in a row. They finally ended the regular season in second place and beat local rivals HIFK in the quarter-finals and other local rivals Jokerit in the semi-finals, proceeding to the finals and thus ensuring their first medal ever. The team eventually ended up second after losing in the finals to Kärpät.

In the next season, the team was again second after the regular season, but lost against Kärpät in the semi-finals, as well as the bronze medal game against KalPa. The season also included participation in the Champions Hockey League, where the Blues lost in the semi-finals against eventual champion ZSC Lions of Switzerland. The 2009–10 season was difficult for the team, and the Blues failed to reach the quarter-finals. In 2010–11, the team ended the regular season in ninth place and then beat eighth-placed Kärpät in the wild card round of the playoffs. The team then made history by becoming the first team in the SM-liiga to advance from the wild card round to the semi-finals, eventually beating Ässät in six games. In the semi-finals, the Blues continued their string of upsets and beat regular season winners JYP in five games. In the finals, HIFK swept the series in four games, and the Blues were awarded the silver medal for the second time in team history.

In the 2011–12 season, the Blues finished eighth in the regular season. After beating Lukko in the wild card round, the team faced KalPa in the quarter-finals. The Blues made history again, becoming the first team in SM-liiga history to win the series after being down 0–3. In the semi-finals, the Pelicans beat the Blues 4–1.

After declining ticket income and increasing expenses after a reacquisition by Jääkiekko Espoo Oy in 2012, the Blues were declared bankrupt in March 2016. Their final ranking in the 2015–2016 season was 15th, the lowest in the league.

=== Continuing the legacy: From the Suomi-sarja to the Liiga (2018–present) ===
After the collapse of the Espoo Blues and Espoo United, Kiekko-Espoo was established in 2018. The new Kiekko-Espoo played its first season in Suomi-sarja from where it got promoted to Mestis.

Kiekko-Espoo made it to the Mestis finals in the 2021–22 season but lost to Imatran Ketterä in 5 games. The team made to the Mestis finals again in the 2022–23, this time defeating Imatran Ketterä to become champions. Kiekko-Espoo will try to enter SM-liiga in the 2024–2025 season, and applied for the license on 30 October 2023. The license for the 2024–25 season got accepted on 20 December 2023. Kiekko-Espoo won the Mestis bronze medal in 2024.

== Season by season record ==
Season	League	GP	W	T	L	OTW	OTL	Pts	GF	GA	Finish	Playoffs
1986–87	II-Divisioona	?	?	?	?	—	—	?	?	?	?	—
1987–88	II-Divisioona	28	24	2	2	—	—	50	214	82	1st	Promoted
1988–89	I-Divisioona	44	28	0	16	—	—	56	228	177	3rd	—
1989–90	I-Divisioona	44	17	1	26	—	—	35	214	229	7th	—
1990–91	I-Divisioona	44	?	?	?	—	—	49	186	166	5th	—
1991–92	I-Divisioona	44	32	5	7	—	—	69	222	121	1st	Promoted
1992–93	SM-liiga	48	11	7	29	—	—	31	122	194	11th	Did not make playoffs
1993–94	SM-liiga	48	13	5	27	—	—	31	138	197	11th	Did not make playoffs
1994–95	SM-liiga	50	20	4	26	—	—	44	154	169	7th	Quarterfinal loss
1995–96	SM-liiga	50	18	6	26	—	—	42	131	164	9th	Did not make playoffs
1996–97	SM-liiga	50	21	9	20	—	—	51	154	163	6th	Quarterfinal loss
1997–98	SM-liiga	48	20	6	22	—	—	46	153	139	4th	Bronze game loss
1998–99	SM-liiga	54	21	7	26	—	—	49	146	183	7th	Quarterfinal loss
1999–00	SM-liiga	54	19	10	25	—	—	48	163	165	7th	Quarterfinal loss
2000–01	SM-liiga	56	22	8	26	—	—	52	154	152	9th	Did not make playoffs
2001–02	SM-liiga	56	24	—	23	1	8	58	156	171	8th	Quarterfinal loss
2002–03	SM-liiga	56	24	10	15	4	2	68	168	145	5th	Quarterfinal loss
2003–04	SM-liiga	56	18	7	23	5	3	56	134	139	8th	Quarterfinal loss
2004–05	SM-liiga	56	15	—	30	5	6	61	139	159	11th	Relegation win
2005–06	SM-liiga	56	23	—	22	4	7	84	152	135	8th	Quarterfinal loss
2006–07	SM-liiga	56	24	—	17	5	10	92	156	135	3rd	Bronze game win
2007–08	SM-liiga	56	33	—	12	5	6	115	165	114	2nd	Final loss
2008–09	SM-liiga	58	28	—	18	4	8	100	159	135	4th	Bronze game loss
2009–10	SM-liiga	58	19	—	23	9	7	82	145	155	9th	Wild Card loss
2010–11	SM-liiga	60	21	—	24	8	7	86	142	151	2nd	Final loss
2011–12	SM-liiga	60	18	—	23	9	10	82	148	165	4th	Bronze game loss
2012–13	SM-liiga	60	21	—	28	6	5	80	151	164	12th	Did not make playoffs
2013–14	SM-liiga	60	28	—	26	3	3	93	137	146	6th	Quarterfinal loss
2014–15	SM-liiga	60	25	—	21	11	3	100	166	149	5th	Quarterfinal loss
2015–16	SM-liiga	60	13	—	33	6	8	59	108	168	15th	Did not make playoffs
2016–17	Did not play											
2017–18	Did not play											
2018–19	Suomi-sarja	39	24	—	10	4	1	81	167	108	3rd	—
2019–20	Suomi-sarja	37	31	—	3	4	1	98	221	70	1st	Promoted
2020–21	Mestis	31	17	6	8	—	—	60	108	84	5th	Quarterfinal loss
2021–22	Mestis	52	26	—	13	9	4	99	158	126	2nd	Final loss
2022–23	Mestis	52	36	—	8	6	2	122	222	111	1st	Final win
2023–24	Mestis	48	26	—	15	2	5	87	166	130	3rd	Promoted
2024–25	SM-liiga			—								

== Home arena ==
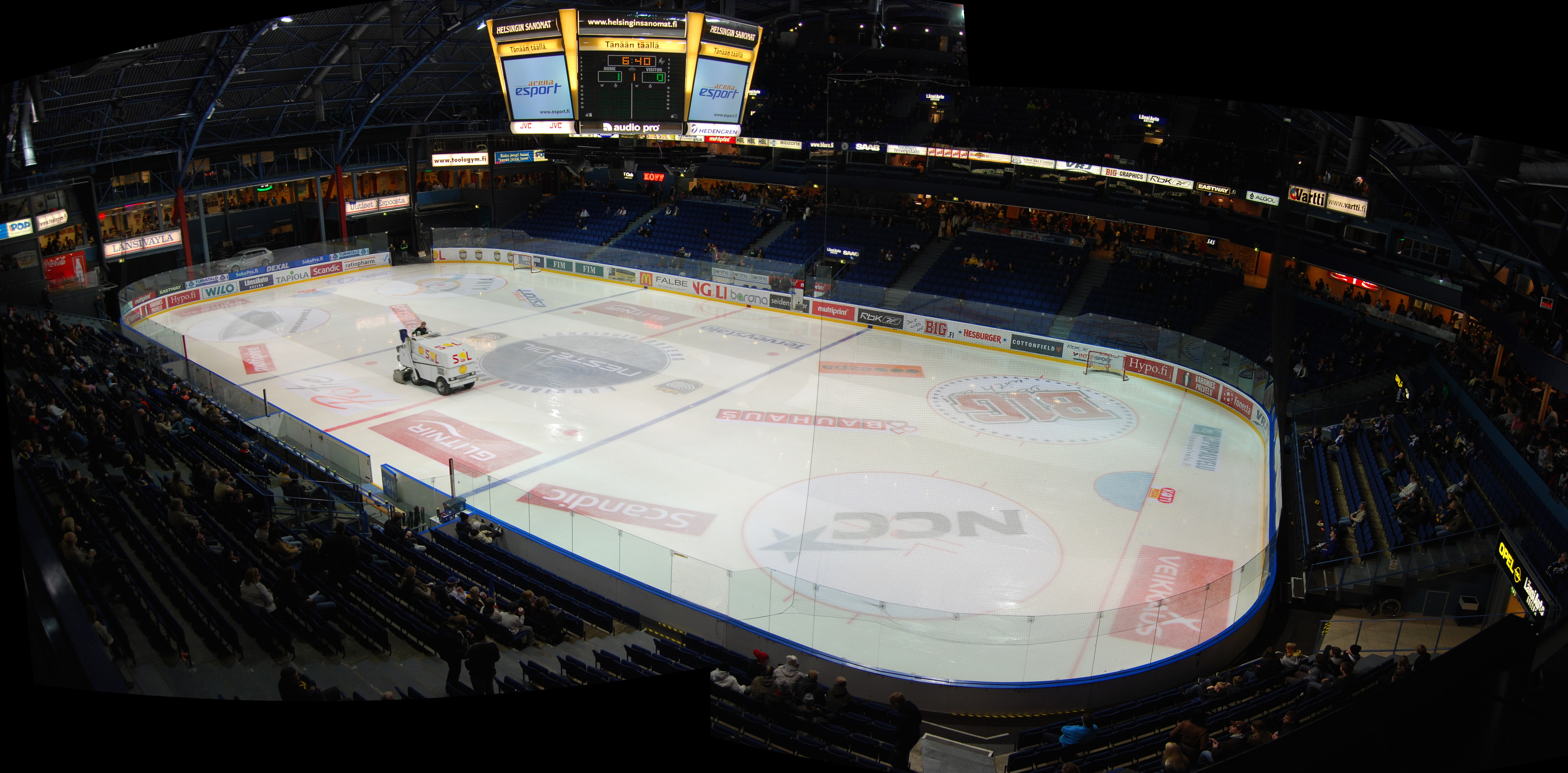
Espoo Metro Areena from the inside.

Kiekko-Espoo plays their home games in the 1999 built Espoo Metro Areena located in the Tapiola sporting park in Espoo. The arena has a capacity of 6,982.

== Honours ==
=== Liiga ===
The 2018 established Kiekko-Espoo does not claim any achievements before the year 2018.

(gold) Aaro Kivilinna Memorial Trophy (7): 2007, 2009, 2011, 2012, 2013, 2014, 2015

(silver) Kanada-malja: Finnish championship (2): 2008, 2011

=== Mestis ===
- (gold) Winner (1) : 2022–23
- (silver) Runner-up (1) : 2021–22
- (bronze) Third place (1) : 2023–24

=== Finnish Cup ===
(gold) Winner (1): 2022
(silver) Runner-up (1): 2021

=== Junior champions ===
- A-juniors (20-year-olds) (4): 1989, 1990, 2009, 2014
- B-juniors (18-year-olds) (3): 1988, 1993, 2011
- C-juniors (16-year-olds) (3): 2011, 2012, 2014

== Players ==
=== Current squad ===
No.	Nat	Player	Pos	S/G	Age	Acquired	Birthplace
24	(Sweden)	Arvid Degerstedt	C	L	26	2024	Norrköping, Sweden
31	(Sweden)	Marcus Hellgren-Smed	G	L	32	2024	Mora, Sweden
8	(Canada)	Cameron Hillis	C	R	25	2024	Oshawa, Ontario, Canada
28	(Finland)	Janne Hämäläinen	LW	L	28	2022	Nurmijärvi, Finland
16	(Finland)	Joni Ikonen	C	R	26	2024	Espoo, Finland
71	(Finland)	Matti Järvinen (A)	C	L	36	2024	London, England
46	(Denmark)	Anders Koch	D	L	28	2024	Esbjerg, Denmark
90	(Finland)	Juho Koivusaari	LW	R	27	2022	Helsinki, Finland
26	(Finland)	Kasper Kulonummi	D	R	22	2024	Helsinki, Finland
34	(Finland)	Aleksi Laakso	D	L	36	2024	Seinäjoki, Finland
47	(Finland)	Ville Lajunen (C)	D	R	38	2024	Helsinki, Finland
18	(Finland)	Ottoville Leppänen	LW	L	27	2024	Espoo, Finland
7	(Finland)	Eelis Marila	D	L	19	2024	Espoo, Finland
12	(Finland)	Joni Piipponen	LW	L	31	2022	Nurmijärvi, Finland
89	(Canada)	Peter Quenneville	C	R	32	2024	Edmonton, Alberta, Canada
30	(Finland)	Petteri Rimpinen	G	L	19	2023	Kirkkonummi, Finland
30	(Sweden)	Joachim Rohdin	RW	R	34	2024	Gävle, Sweden
41	(Finland)	Tomi Sallinen (A)	C	L	37	2024	Espoo, Finland
85	(Finland)	Niko Seppälä	D	L	27	2023	Helsinki, Finland
29	(Finland)	Tuomas Suoniemi	C	L	19	2023	Stavanger, Norway
21	(Finland)	Rasmus Toivainen	LW	L	21	2023	Espoo, Finland
82	(Finland)	Venni Tolppola	C	R	21	2024	Nurmijärvi, Finland
78	(Finland)	Arttu Tuomaala	C	L	24	2021	Oulu, Finland
75	(Finland)	Santeri Virtanen	C	L	26	2024	Kirkkonummi, Finland

Updated 21 September 2024

=== Honored members ===
List of retired numbers:

Kiekko-Espoo retired numbers
No.	Player	Position	Tenure	Date of retirement	References
10	Jere Lehtinen	LW	1990–1993	30 September 2014	
33	Timo Hirvonen	LW	1990–2003 2005–2006 (player) 2011–2015 (coach)	6 March 2007	

=== Notable alumni ===
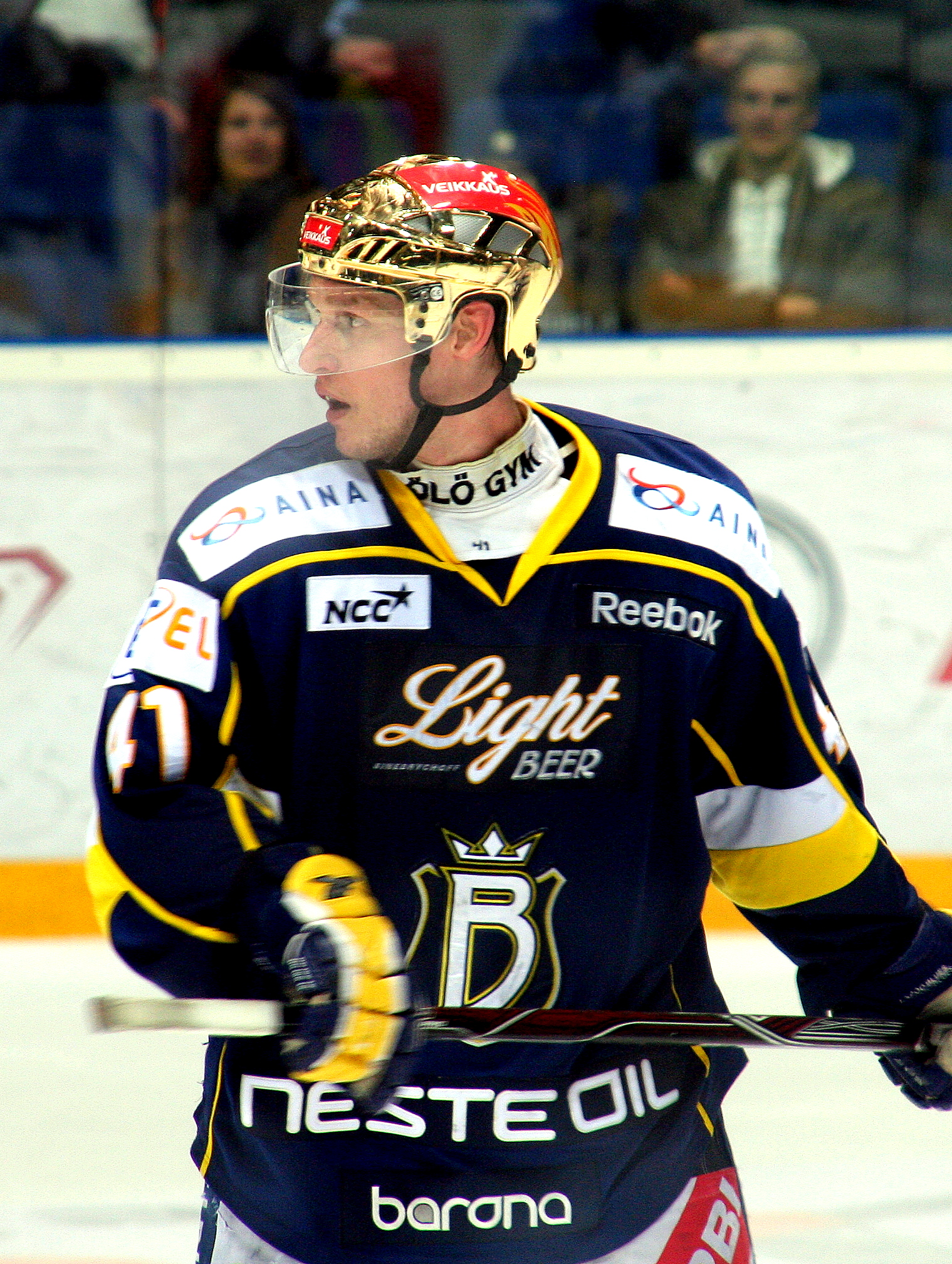
Stefan Öhman with the Espoo Blues carrying the golden helmet in 2010.

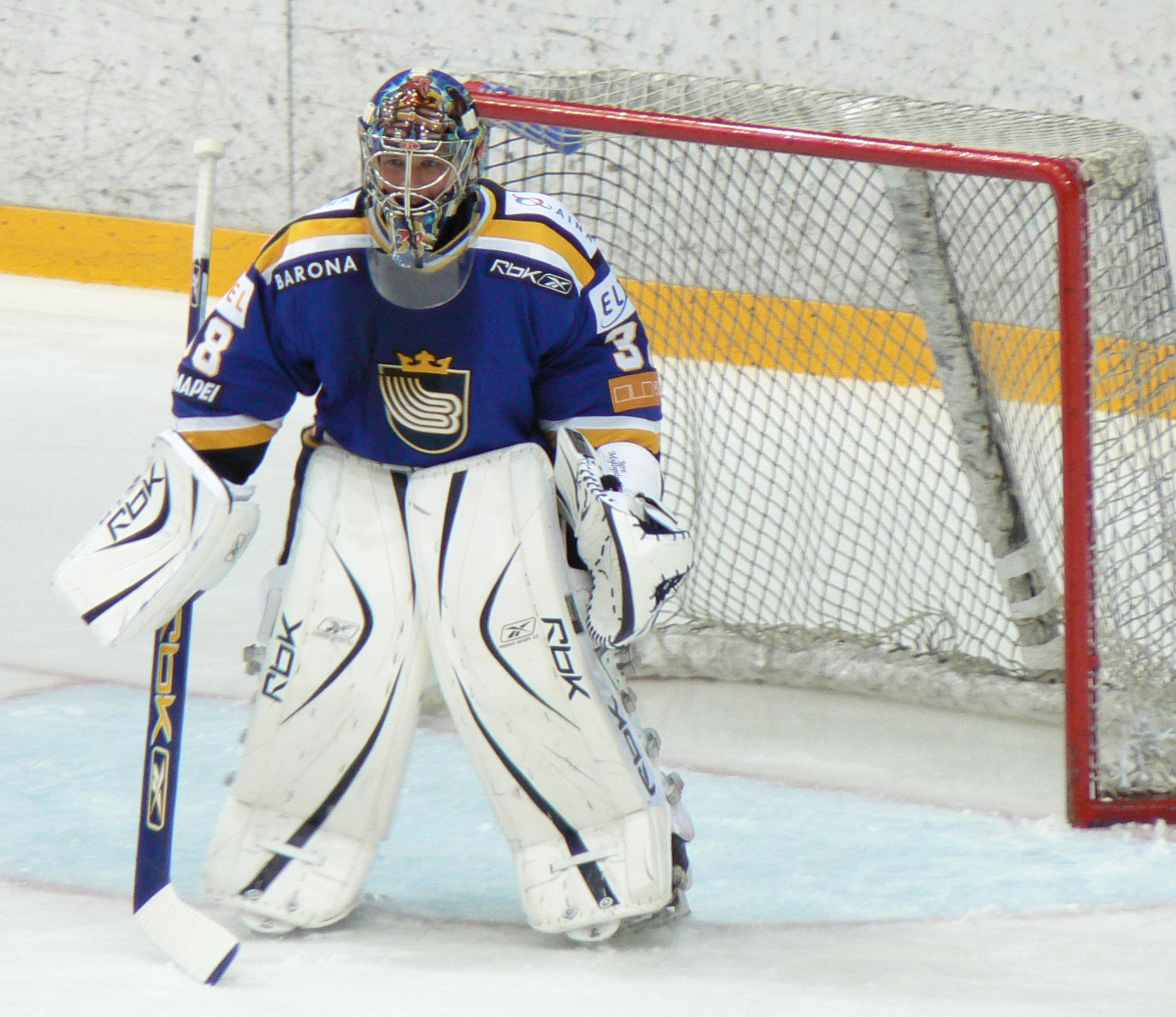
Jere Myllyniemi

- (Finland) Peter Ahola
- (United States) Tyler Arnason
- (Canada) Frank Banham
- (Finland) Timo Blomqvist
- (Canada) Scott Brower
- (Austria) Bernd Brückler
- (Czech Republic) Jan Čaloun
- (Poland) Mariusz Czerkawski
- (Sweden) Johan Davidsson
- (Canada) Tom Draper
- (United States) Ben Eaves
- (Sweden) Nils Ekman
- (Finland) Jere Elo
- (Sweden) Joakim Eriksson
- (Finland) Kari Haakana
- (Finland) Niklas Hagman
- (Finland) Santeri Heiskanen
- (Finland) Timo Hirvonen
- (Finland) Juha Ikonen
- (Czech Republic) Otakar Janecký
- (Finland) Joonas Jääskeläinen
- (Finland) Jere Karalahti
- (Canada) Martin Kariya
- (Canada) Steve Kariya
- (Canada) Ryan Keller
- (Czech Republic) Ladislav Kohn
- (Canada) Krys Kolanos
- (Slovakia) Ľubomír Kolník
- (Finland) Arto Kuki
- (Finland) Arto Laatikainen
- (Finland) Jani Lajunen
- (Finland) Tero Lehterä
- (Finland) Jere Lehtinen
- (Finland) Jan Långbacka
- (Finland) Mikko Lehtonen
- (Canada) Donald MacLean
- (United States) Ryan Malone
- (Canada) Kent Manderville
- (United States) Shawn McEachern
- (Canada) Kurtis McLean
- (Canada) Dale McTavish
- (Slovakia) Branislav Mezei
- (Canada) Cory Murphy
- (Finland) Jarmo Myllys
- (Finland) Sami Nuutinen
- (Sweden) / (Finland) Stefan Öhman
- (Finland) Oskar Osala
- (Finland) Antti Pihlström
- (Finland) Esa Pirnes
- (Russia) Sergei Pryakhin
- (Finland) Erkki Rajamäki
- (Canada) Mike Ribeiro
- (Canada) Nathan Robinson
- (Finland) Christian Ruuttu
- (Finland) Ilkka Sinisalo
- (Finland) Petri Skriko
- (Finland) Iiro Tarkki
- (Czech Republic) Petr Ton
- (Finland) Lauri Tukonen
- (Finland) Antti Törmänen
- (Czech Republic) Jiří Vykoukal
- (United States) Landon Wilson
- (Finland) Juha Ylönen

=== Captains history ===
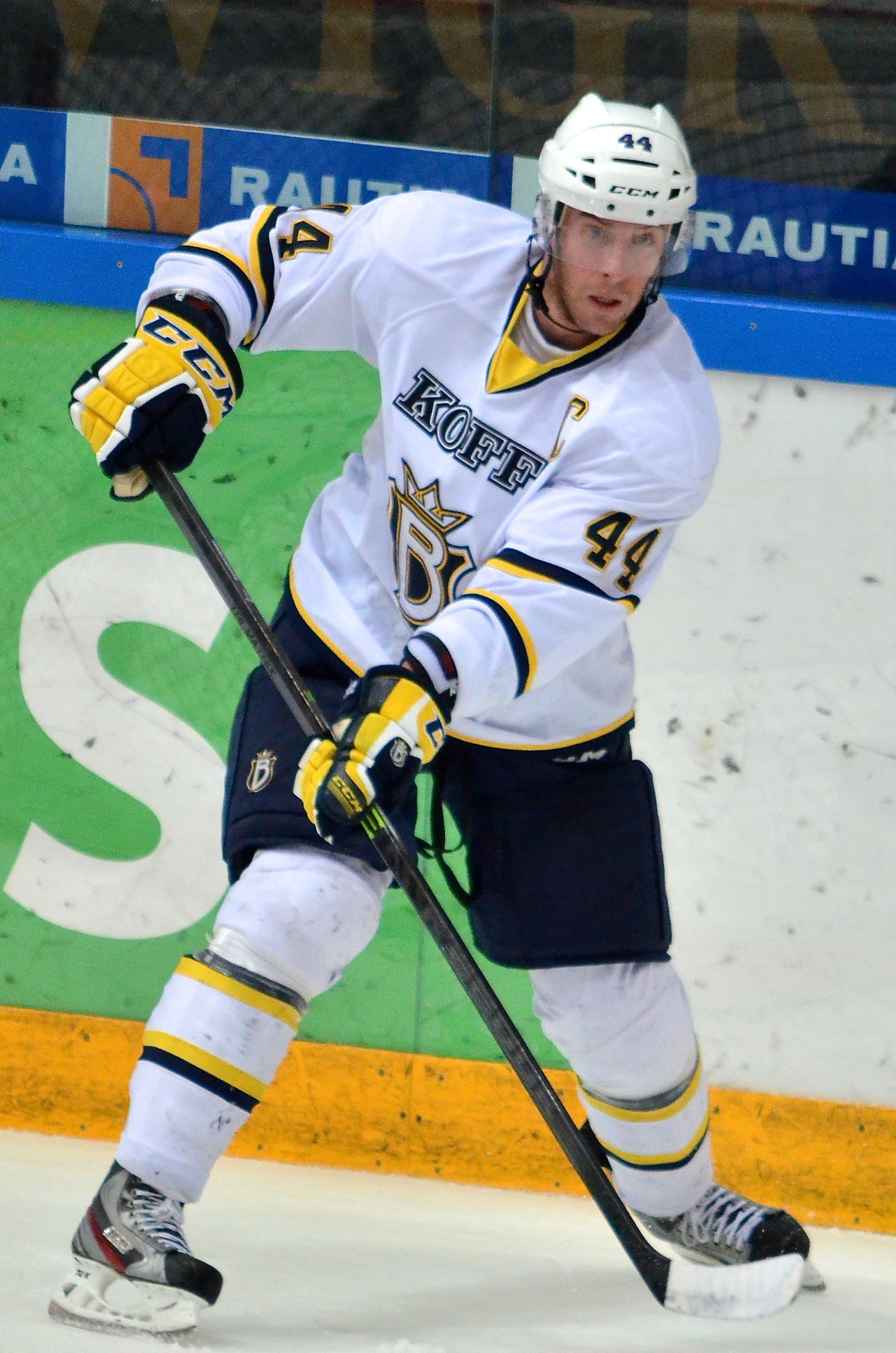
Kim Hirschovits wearing the captain's "C" with the Espoo Blues.

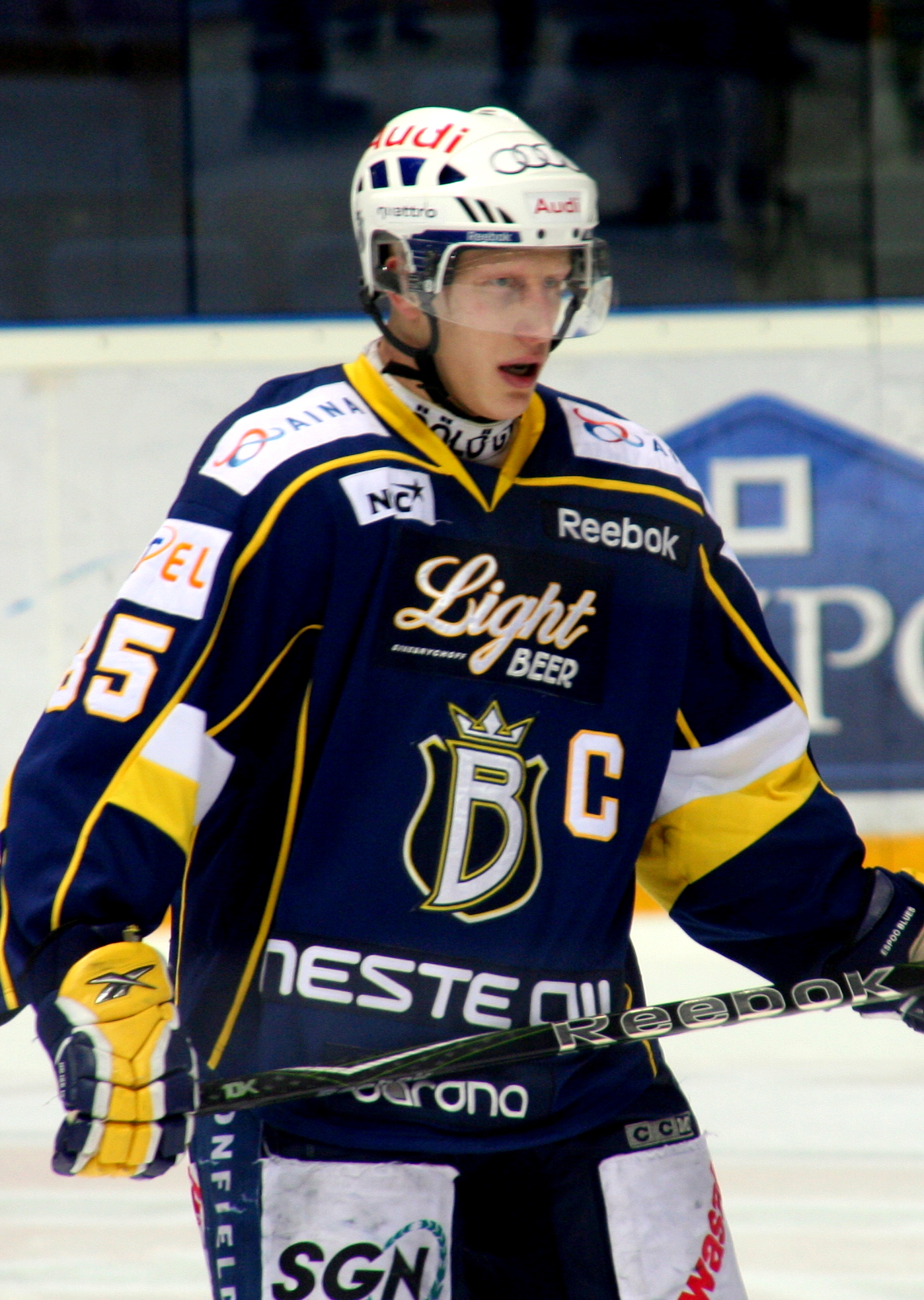
Toni Kähkönen as the Blues captain.

Kiekko-Espoo (1984–1998)

- (Finland) Jan Långbacka (1992–1994)
- (Finland) Hannu Järvenpää (1994)
- (Finland) Peter Ahola (1994–95)
- (Finland) Jarmo Muukkonen (1995–96)
- (Finland) Teemu Sillanpää (1996–97)
- (Finland) Juha Ikonen (1997–98)

Espoo Blues

- (Finland) Juha Ikonen (1998–99)
- (Finland) Peter Ahola (1999–2001)
- (Finland) Valeri Krykov (2001–02)
- (Finland) Juha Ylönen (2002–03)
- (Finland) Rami Alanko (2003–2005)
- (Finland) Timo Hirvonen (2005, stepped down as captain in November 2005)
- (Finland) Markku Hurme (2005–06, replaced Hirvonen as captain mid-season)
- (Sweden) Joakim Eriksson (2006)
- (Finland) Markku Hurme
  (Finland) Ville Viitaluoma
  (Finland) Erkki Rajamäki
  (Canada) Kent Manderville (2006–07, rotating captaincy)
- (Finland) Rami Alanko (2007–2009)
- (Finland) Toni Kähkönen (2009–2012)
- (Finland) Arto Laatikainen (2012–13)
- (Finland) Kim Hirschovits (2013–2016)

Kiekko-Espoo

- (Finland) Nikke Kettukangas (2018–19)
- (Finland) Juuso Hämäläinen (2019–20)
- (Finland) Arto Laatikainen (2020–21)
- (Finland) Toni Kähkönen (2021–22)
- (Finland) Miro Keskitalo (2022–2024)

== Head coaches ==
Kiekko-Espoo (1984–1998)

- (Finland) Martti Merra (1992–1994, replaced in January)
- (Finland) Hannu Saintula (1994, mid-season replacement)
- (Finland) Harri Rindell (1994–1996)
- (Sweden) Håkan Nygren (1996–1998, replaced in February)
- (Finland) Hannu Saintula (1998, mid-season replacement)

Espoo Blues

- (Finland) Pekka Rautakallio (1998, replaced in November)
- (Finland) Hannu Saintula (1998–1999, mid-season replacement)
- (Finland) Jukka Holtari (1999–2000, replaced in January)
- (Finland) Jari Härkälä (2000, mid-season replacement)
- (Finland) Timo Tuomi (2000–01, replaced in September of second season)
- (Finland) Hannu Kapanen (2001–2003, mid-season replacement, continued in the next season)
- (United States) Ted Sator (2003, replaced in October)
- (Finland) Hannu Virta (2003–04, mid-season replacement, replaced in the October of second season)
- (Finland) Pekka Rautakallio (2004–05)
- (Finland) Kari Heikkilä (2005–2007)
- (Finland) Petri Matikainen (2007–2011)
- (Finland) Lauri Marjamäki (2011–2013, replaced in February)
- (Finland) Mikko Saarinen (2013, mid-season replacement)
- (Finland) Jyrki Aho (2013–2016)

Kiekko-Espoo

- (Finland) Mikko Juutilainen (2018–19)
- (Finland) Kim Hirschovits (2019–20)
- (Finland) Janne Tuunanen (2020–21)
- (Finland) Kim Hirschovits (2021–22)
- (Finland) Tomas Westerlund (2022–2024)
- (Finland) Jyrki Aho (2024–)

== Logo history ==
Logo used by Kiekko-Espoo 1984–98

Logo used by the Espoo Blues 1998–03

Logo used by the Espoo Blues 2003–05

Logo used by the Espoo Blues 2005–09

Logo used by the Espoo Blues 2009–16

Current Kiekko-Espoo logo 2018–
