= Forssa Ice Hall =

Indoor ice hockey venue in Forssa, Finland

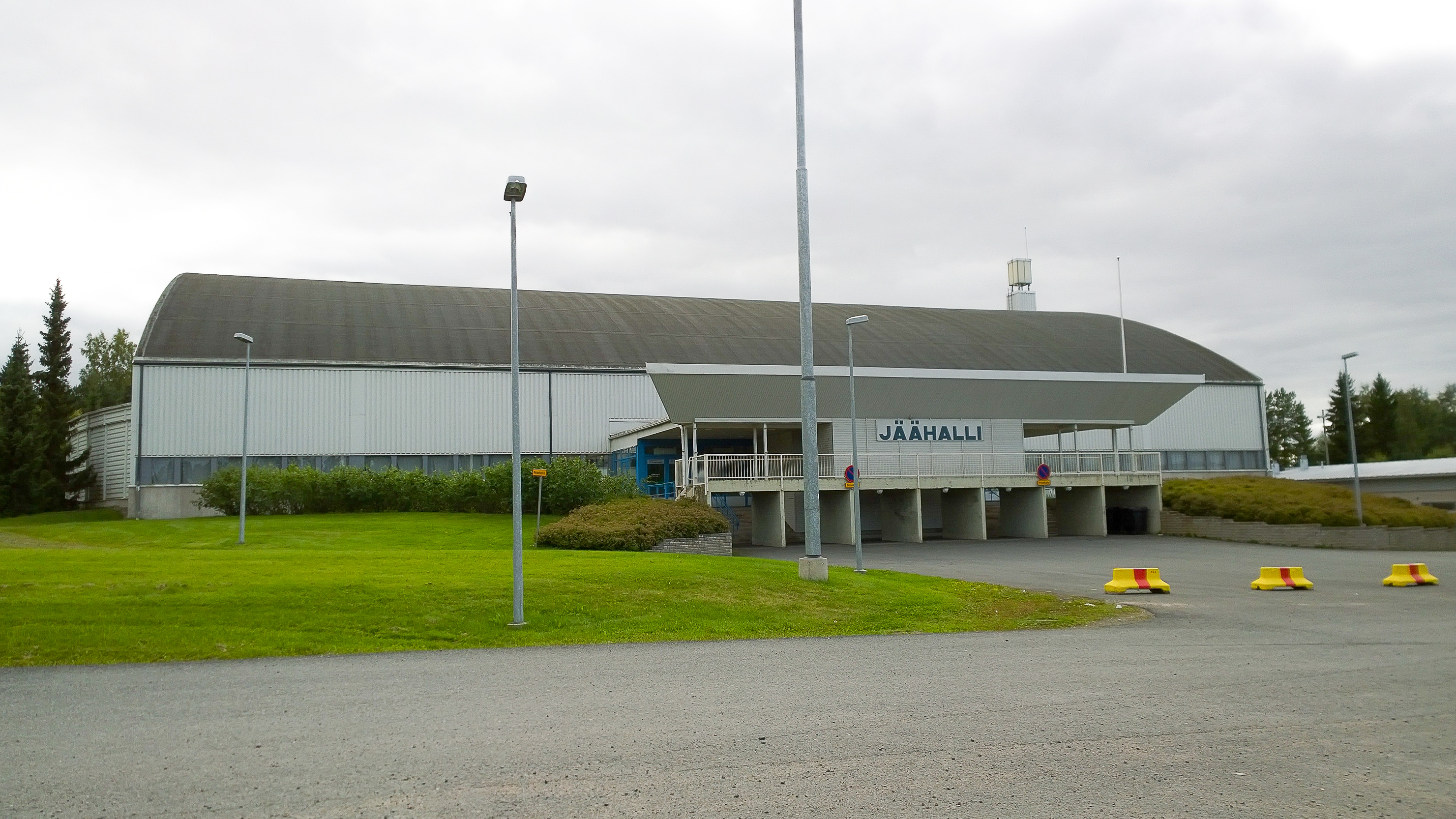
- Interactive map of Forssa Ice Hall
- Address: Urheilukentänkatu 6
- Location: Forssa, Finland
- Coordinates: 60°49′19.4″N 23°38′06.3″E
- Capacity: 3000
- Surface: Versatile

Tenant
- FPS

Forssan Ice Hall is an indoor ice hockey sports venue in Forssa, Finland.
