= 1994–95 SM-liiga season =

Finnish ice hockey season

The 1994–95 SM-liiga season was the 20th season of the SM-liiga, the top level of ice hockey in Finland. 12 teams participated in the league, and TPS Turku won the championship.

== Standings ==
	Team	GP	W	T	L	GF	GA	Diff	Pts
1	Jokerit	50	34	6	10	202	122	+80	74
2	Lukko	50	29	9	12	210	134	+76	67
3	HIFK	50	32	3	15	203	141	+62	67
4	TPS	50	30	3	17	219	149	+70	63
5	JYP	50	22	8	20	164	181	-17	52
6	Ässät	50	20	11	19	164	166	-2	51
7	Kiekko-Espoo	50	20	4	26	154	169	-15	44
8	KalPa	50	17	8	25	154	195	-41	42
9	HPK	50	16	7	27	170	197	-27	39
10	Tappara	50	16	4	30	154	221	-67	36
11	TuTo	50	18	0	32	152	227	-75	36
12	Ilves	50	12	5	33	152	196	-44	29

Source: Elite Prospects

== Playoffs ==
=== Quarterfinals ===
- Jokerit - KalPa 3:0 (6:3, 6:0, 5:1)
- Lukko - Kiekko-Espoo 3:1 (4:3 P, 2:4, 2:1 P, 4:3)
- HIFK - Ässät 0:3 (1:2, 0:3, 0:3)
- TPS - JYP 3:1 (2:1 P, 2:4, 4:3 P, 8:0)

=== Semifinals ===
- Jokerit - Ässät 3:0 (6:0, 4:3, 7:0)
- Lukko - TPS 1:3 (6:4, 3:4, 4:6, 3:4)

=== 3rd place ===
- Ässät - Lukko 3:0

=== Final ===
- Jokerit - TPS 2:3 (2:1, 1:3, 5:2, 2:5, 1:5)
- Jokerit - TPS - 2:1 (0:0, 1:1, 1:0). 8 276 .

Koivu (Summanen, 35:11) - 0:1. Terjavainen (Termenen, 39:28) - 1:1. Termenen (Strömberg, 56:55) - 2:1.

- TPS - Jokerit - 3:1 (2:1, 0:0, 1:0).11 000.

Lind (Sormunen, Koivisto, 10:08) - 0:1. Lehtinen (Summanen, Koivu, 12:23) - 1:1. Sillgren (Pirjetä, 13:02) - 2:1. Fanduls (Suvanto, 49:35) - 3:1.

- Jokerit - TPS - 5:2 (1:0, 1:1, 3:1). 8 276.
