= 2003–04 SM-liiga season =

- TV partner: MTV3
- Finals champions: Oulun Kärpät
- Runners-up: HC TPS

SM-liiga seasons
- ← 2002–03 2004–05 →

The 2003–04 SM-liiga season was the 29th season of the SM-liiga, the top level of ice hockey in Finland. 13 teams participated in the league, and Kärpät Oulu won the championship.

== Regular season ==
Rank	Team	GP	W	OTW	T	OTL	L	GF	GA	Diff	Pts
1.	TPS	56	30	5	7	3	11	169	112	+57	80
2.	Kärpät	56	29	6	4	4	13	194	129	+65	78
3.	HIFK	56	30	3	5	1	17	181	142	+39	72
4.	HPK	56	27	3	7	2	17	162	122	+40	69
5.	Lukko	56	24	3	8	3	18	154	127	+27	65
6.	Ilves	56	24	5	3	4	20	159	148	+11	65
7.	Jokerit	56	23	4	7	3	19	131	120	+11	64
8.	Tappara	56	24	2	2	5	23	158	145	+13	59
9.	Blues	56	18	5	7	3	23	134	139	-5	56
10.	JYP	56	18	2	7	5	24	138	166	-28	52
11.	Ässät	56	17	4	5	3	27	140	186	-46	50
12.	SaiPa	56	11	2	5	5	27	127	194	-67	36
13.	Pelicans	56	7	1	7	4	37	110	227	-117	27

== Playoffs ==
=== Preliminary round ===
- Jokerit - JYP 2:0 (5:2, 3:2)
- Tappara - Blues 1:2 (1:2 P, 4:1, 0:2)

=== Quarterfinals ===
- TPS - Blues 4:2 (3:2, 2:4, 4:0, 2:3, 4:2, 2:0)
- Kärpät - Jokerit 4:2 (3:2, 3:2, 2:5, 2:1, 1:2, 2:1)
- HIFK - Ilves 4:3 (3:1, 2:3, 0:3, 2:4, 3:0, 1:0, 4:3)
- HPK - Lukko 4:0 (3:2, 5:0, 4:0, 3:1)

=== Semifinals ===
- TPS - HPK 3:0 (2:0, 4:3 P, 3:1)
- Kärpät - HIFK 3:2 (3:2 P, 2:4, 0:5, 3:2 P, 3:2 P)

=== 3rd place ===
- HIFK - HPK 3:1

=== Final ===
- TPS - Kärpät 1:3 (1:2, 3:4 P, 5:0, 0:1 P)
