= 1995–96 SM-liiga season =

Finnish ice hockey season

SM-liiga introduced this logo for the 1995–96 season. It was used until 2005.

The 1995–96 SM-liiga season was the 21st season of the SM-liiga, the top level of ice hockey in Finland. 12 teams participated in the league, and Jokerit Helsinki won the championship.

== Standings ==
	Team	GP	W	T	L	GF	GA	Diff	Pts
1	Jokerit	50	31	11	8	190	91	+99	73
2	TPS	50	33	5	12	216	141	+75	71
3	Lukko	50	25	9	16	205	177	+28	59
4	Tappara	50	24	7	19	172	161	+11	55
5	HPK	50	23	7	20	160	151	+9	53
6	HIFK	50	21	10	19	142	158	-16	52
7	Ässät	50	22	5	23	140	160	-20	49
8	Ilves	50	18	7	25	153	183	-30	43
9	Kiekko-Espoo	50	18	6	26	131	164	-33	42
10	JYP	50	13	11	26	132	155	-23	37
11	KalPa	50	13	10	27	126	162	-36	36
12	TuTo	50	12	6	32	140	204	-64	30

Source: Elite Prospects

== Playoffs ==
=== Quarterfinals ===
- Jokerit - Ilves 3:0 (11:2, 7:2, 3:1)
- TPS - Ässät 3:0 (4:0, 4:2, 6:3)
- Lukko - HIFK 3:0 (2:1, 6:4, 4:1)
- Tappara - HPK 1:3 (1:3, 3:5, 7:2, 1:7)

=== Semifinals ===
- Jokerit - HPK 3:1 (2:3, 3:0, 4:1, 6:0)
- TPS - Lukko 3:1 (2:3, 3:1, 4:2, 4:2)

=== 3rd place ===
- Lukko - HPK 2:1

=== Final ===
- Jokerit - TPS 3:1 (0:1, 6:1, 5:1, 4:1)
