= 1999–2000 SM-liiga season =

- TV partner: MTV3
- Finals champions: HC TPS
- Runners-up: Jokerit

SM-liiga seasons
- ← 1998–99 2000–01 →

The 1999–2000 SM-liiga season was the 25th season of the SM-liiga, the top level of ice hockey in Finland. 12 teams participated in the league, and TPS Turku won the championship.

== Standings ==
	Club	GP	W	T	L	GF	GA	Diff	Pts
1	TPS	54	39	5	10	232	118	+114	83
2	HPK	54	32	7	15	209	161	+48	71
3	Tappara	54	31	8	15	187	148	+39	70
4	Lukko	54	28	9	17	159	125	+34	65
5	Jokerit	54	27	9	18	147	131	+16	63
6	HIFK	54	23	10	21	171	162	+9	56
7	Blues	54	19	10	25	163	165	-2	48
8	Ilves	54	19	9	26	151	190	-39	47
9	SaiPa	54	16	13	25	154	185	-31	45
10	JYP	54	13	13	28	158	211	-53	39
11	Ässät	54	14	9	31	171	217	-46	37
12	Pelicans	54	8	8	38	108	197	-89	24

Source: Elite Prospects

== Playoffs ==
=== Quarterfinals ===
- TPS - Ilves 3:0 (6:3, 7:1, 4:3 P)
- HPK - Blues 3:1 (5:2, 3:4 P, 8:1, 4:1)
- Tappara - HIFK 1:3 (1:3, 2:3 P, 5:3, 4:5)
- Lukko - Jokerit 1:3 (1:0, 2:3 P, 0:1, 1:3)

=== Semifinals ===
- TPS - HIFK 3:1 (4:5, 3:1, 6:1, 4:2)
- HPK - Jokerit 0:3 (3:4 P, 0:7, 3:4)

=== 3rd place ===
- HPK - HIFK 5:2

=== Final ===
- TPS - Jokerit 3:1 (4:2, 4:1, 2:3, 2:1)

== Qualification ==
=== 1st round ===
Pelicans – Diskos
25. March	Pelicans	Diskos	9-2
26. March	Diskos	Pelicans	2-6
28. March	Pelicans	Diskos	6-2
Pelicans wins 3-0

Kärpät – Sport
1. April	Kärpät	Sport	4-2
3. April	Sport	Kärpät	1-4
4. April	Kärpät	Sport	5-2
Kärpät wins 3-0

=== 2nd round ===
Pelicans – Kärpät
4. April	Pelicans	Kärpät	4-5 OT
6. April	Kärpät	Pelicans	1-5
8. April	Pelicans	Kärpät	0-1 OT
11. April	Kärpät	Pelicans	4-1
Kärpät wins 3-1
