= 1991–92 I-Divisioona season =

The 1991–92 I-Divisioona season was the 18th season of the I-Divisioona, the second level of Finnish ice hockey. 12 teams participated in the league, and Kiekko Espoo won the championship and was promoted to the SM-liiga as a result.

== Regular season ==
	Club	GP	W	T	L	GF–GA	Pts
1.	Kiekko-Espoo	44	32	5	7	222:121	69
2.	Kärpät Oulu	44	31	3	10	208:119	65
3.	KooKoo Kouvola	44	29	3	12	238:176	61
4.	FoPS Forssa	44	26	2	16	250:181	54
5.	Kiekko-67 Turku	44	20	4	20	185:182	44
6.	SaiPa Lappeenranta	44	19	5	20	178:154	43
7.	TuTo Hockey	44	18	5	21	154:180	41
8.	Centers Pietarsaari	44	20	1	23	176:203	41
9.	Vantaa HT	44	17	3	24	202:217	37
10.	HJK Helsinki	44	14	7	23	174:230	35
11.	Karhu-Kissat	44	11	6	27	175:216	28
12.	Vaasan Sport	44	4	2	38	125:308	10
