= 1997–98 SM-liiga season =

Finnish ice hockey season

The 1997–98 SM-liiga season was the 23rd season of the SM-liiga, the top level of ice hockey in Finland. 12 teams participated in the league, and HIFK Helsinki won the championship.

== Standings ==
	Club	GP	W	T	L	GF	GA	Diff	Pts
1	TPS	48	30	6	12	162	111	+51	66
2	HIFK	48	29	5	14	179	115	+64	63
3	Ilves	48	27	6	15	184	138	+46	60
4	Jokerit	48	24	5	19	139	137	+2	53
5	Tappara	48	22	7	19	157	147	+10	53
6	SaiPa	48	21	7	20	135	142	-7	49
7	Ässät	48	20	8	20	163	156	+7	48
8	Kiekko-Espoo	48	20	6	22	153	139	+14	46
9	Lukko	48	20	6	22	131	143	-12	46
10	HPK	48	18	5	25	148	181	-33	41
11	JYP	48	17	3	28	135	167	-32	37
12	KalPa	48	6	4	38	91	201	-110	16

Source: Elite Prospects

== Playoffs ==
=== Quarterfinals ===
- Jokerit - Tappara 3:1 (6:3, 5:7, 3:1, 4:0)
- TPS - Kiekko-Espoo 1:3 (5:1, 0:6, 1:4, 1:2)
- HIFK - Ässät 3:0 (5:4, 8:2, 6:3)
- Ilves - SaiPa 3:0 (10:2, 1:0, 5:1)

=== Semifinals ===
- HIFK - Kiekko-Espoo 3:0 (3:0, 7:3, 6:0)
- Ilves - Jokerit 3:0 (4:3, 4:2, 3:2)

=== 3rd place ===
- Jokerit - Kiekko-Espoo 8:0

=== Final ===
- HIFK - Ilves 3:0 (2:0, 7:1, 2:1 OT)

== Qualification ==
=== First round ===
KalPa – Pelicans
21. March	KalPa	Pelicans	0–1
22. March	Pelicans	KalPa	2–3
24. March	KalPa	Pelicans	2–4
26. March	Pelicans	KalPa	2–3
28. March	KalPa	Pelicans	3-2 OT
KalPa wins 3–2

Kärpät – Hermes
21. March	Kärpät	Hermes	8–3
22. March	Hermes	Kärpät	4–1
24. March	Kärpät	Hermes	3-2 OT
26. March	Hermes	Kärpät	5-4 OT
28. March	Kärpät	Hermes	6–2
Karpat wins 3–2

=== Second round ===
KalPa – Kärpät
31. March	KalPa	Kärpät	3–1
2. April	Kärpät	KalPa	3–1
3. April	KalPa	Kärpät	3-2 OT
5. April	Kärpät	KalPa	2–4
KalPa wins 3–1
