= 2002–03 SM-liiga season =

- TV partner: MTV3
- Finals champions: Tampereen Tappara
- Runners-up: Oulun Kärpät

SM-liiga seasons
- ← 2001–02 2003–04 →

The 2002–03 SM-liiga season was the 28th season of the SM-liiga, the top level of ice hockey in Finland. 13 teams participated in the league, and Tappara Tampere won the championship.

== Regular season ==
Rank	Team	GP	W	OTW	T	OTL	L	GF	GA	Diff	Pts
1.	HPK	56	35	4	7	2	8	209	125	+84	87
2.	Jokerit	56	32	3	6	0	15	154	108	+46	76
3.	Kärpät	56	27	5	8	1	15	186	141	+45	73
4.	Blues	56	25	2	10	4	15	168	145	+23	68
5.	Tappara	56	25	4	5	2	20	156	119	+37	65
6.	JYP	56	25	3	7	2	19	151	146	+5	65
7.	HIFK	56	19	4	9	2	22	177	165	+12	57
8.	TPS	56	24	0	6	2	24	138	138	±0	56
9.	Lukko	56	18	3	8	5	22	130	153	-23	55
10.	Ässät	56	17	2	8	4	25	125	154	-29	50
11.	SaiPa	56	17	2	6	4	27	134	171	-37	48
12.	Pelicans	56	13	2	2	4	35	120	181	-61	36
13.	Ilves	56	7	3	4	5	37	111	211	-100	29

== Playoffs ==
=== Quarterfinals ===
- HPK - TPS 4:3 (1:2, 3:1, 2:3 P, 0:4, 3:1, 7:0, 6:1)
- Jokerit - HIFK 4:0 (2:1, 4:2, 5:2, 4:1)
- Kärpät - JYP 4:3 (2:5, 4:1, 2:3 P, 2:4, 6:2, 4:1, 3:1)
- Blues - Tappara 3:4 (4:1, 4:2, 2:3 P, 1:4, 4:3 P, 0:2, 1:2 P)

=== Semifinals ===
- HPK - Tappara 2:3 (3:2 P, 1:2, 3:2 P, 1:2 P, 2:4)
- Jokerit - Kärpät 2:3 (1:0, 2:4, 3:0, 1:2, 0:2)

=== 3rd place ===
- HPK - Jokerit 3:0

=== Final ===
- Kärpät - Tappara 0:3 (2:3 P, 0:3, 3:4 P)
