= 1993–94 SM-liiga season =

Finnish ice hockey season

The 1993–94 SM-liiga season was the 19th season of the SM-liiga, the top level of ice hockey in Finland. 12 teams participated in the league, and Jokerit Helsinki won the championship.

== Standings ==
Rank	Club	GP	W	T	L	GF	GA	Diff	P
1.	TPS	48	34	0	14	227	124	+103	68
2.	Ässät	48	25	7	16	185	148	+37	57
3.	Jokerit	48	26	4	18	181	131	+50	56
4.	Lukko	48	26	4	18	165	142	+23	56
5.	JyP HT	48	26	4	18	157	135	+22	56
6.	Ilves	48	21	9	18	153	144	+9	51
7.	Tappara	48	23	5	20	175	175	0	51
8.	HIFK	48	23	4	21	167	161	+6	50
9.	HPK	48	23	3	22	167	170	-3	49
10.	KalPa	48	16	5	27	143	170	-27	37
11.	K-Espoo	48	13	5	30	138	197	-59	31
12.	Reipas	48	6	2	40	119	280	-161	14

Source: Elite Prospects

== Playoffs ==
=== Quarterfinals ===
- TPS - HIFK 3:0 (4:1, 2:1, 7:3)
- Ässät - Tappara Tampere 2:3 (3:4, 2:5, 7:4, 5:4, 1:4)
- Jokerit - Ilves 3:1 (6:1, 4:1, 2:3, 5:1)
- Lukko - JYP 3:1 (3:1, 1:2, 4:1, 4:1)

=== Semifinal ===
- TPS - Tappara Tampere 3:1 (6:4, 1:3, 6:3, 4:2)
- Jokerit - Lukko 3:1 (2:0, 5:0, 0:4, 2:1 P)

=== 3rd place ===
- Lukko - Tappara Tampere 3:2 P

=== Final ===
- TPS - Jokerit 1:3 (4:1, 0:3, 1:2, 2:3 P)

== Relegation ==
Rank	Club	GP	W	T	L	GF	GA	Diff	P
1.	TuTo	6	4	0	2	24	25	-1	8
2.	SaiPa	6	3	0	3	24	22	+2	6
3.	Jokipojat	6	2	1	3	28	25	+3	5
4.	Reipas	6	2	1	3	19	23	-4	5
