= 2001–02 SM-liiga season =

- TV partner: MTV3
- Finals champions: Jokerit
- Runners-up: Tampereen Tappara

SM-liiga seasons
- ← 2000–01 2002–03 →

The 2001–02 SM-liiga season was the 27th season of the SM-liiga, the top level of ice hockey in Finland. 13 teams participated in the league, and Jokerit Helsinki won the championship.

== Regular season ==
Rank	Team	GP	W	OTW	T/OTL	L	GF	GA	Diff	Pts
1.	Tappara	56	34	2	7	13	173	109	+64	79
2.	HPK	56	33	3	6	14	221	138	+83	78
3.	Jokerit	56	29	2	9	16	160	102	+58	71
4.	TPS	56	31	1	5	19	154	111	+43	69
5.	Pelicans	56	27	4	6	19	157	152	+5	68
6.	Kärpät	56	25	1	8	22	156	148	+8	60
7.	Ilves	56	22	2	10	22	155	161	-6	58
8.	Blues	56	24	1	8	23	156	171	-15	58
9.	JYP	56	19	4	11	22	145	158	-13	57
10.	HIFK	56	19	0	11	26	148	168	-20	49
11.	Ässät	56	13	4	6	33	133	191	-58	40
12.	Lukko	56	13	0	9	34	10	181	-71	35
13.	SaiPa	56	13	1	3	39	124	202	-78	31

== Playoffs ==
=== Quarterfinals ===
- Tappara - Blues 3:0 (3:1, 5:2, 3:1)
- HPK - Ilves 3:0 (4:1, 6:1, 5:1)
- Jokerit - Kärpät 3:1 (6:2, 3:5, 3:0, 5:1)
- TPS - Pelicans 3:1 (4:1, 4:5 P, 3:2 P, 2:0)

=== Semifinals ===
- HPK - Jokerit 1:3 (4:3, 2:3, 2:3 P, 0:1)
- Tappara - TPS 3:0 (3:1, 3:1, 2:1 P)

=== 3rd place ===
- HPK - TPS 3:1 (

=== Final ===
- Tappara - Jokerit 1:3 (5:4, 1:3, 2:3, 1:2)
