= 2000–01 SM-liiga season =

Sports season

- TV partner: MTV3
- Finals champions: HC TPS
- Runners-up: Tampereen Tappara

SM-liiga seasons
- ← 1999–2000 2001–02 →

The 2000–01 SM-liiga season was the 26th season of the SM-liiga, the top level of ice hockey in Finland. 13 teams participated in the league, and TPS Turku won the championship.

== Standings ==
	Club	GP	W	T	L	GF	GA	Diff	Pts
1	Jokerit	56	35	7	14	184	127	+57	77
2	TPS	56	36	4	16	186	115	+71	76
3	Tappara	56	32	5	19	166	134	+32	69
4	HIFK	56	26	7	23	172	171	+1	59
5	Ilves	56	24	11	21	147	146	+1	59
6	Lukko	56	21	14	21	146	146	0	56
7	Pelicans	56	22	11	23	170	164	+6	55
8	Kärpät	56	23	8	25	165	178	-13	54
9	Blues	56	22	8	26	154	152	+2	52
10	SaiPa	56	24	3	29	152	154	-2	51
11	HPK	56	22	7	27	161	180	-19	51
12	JYP	56	15	9	32	136	185	-49	39
13	Ässät	56	11	8	37	141	228	-87	30

== Playoffs ==
=== Quarterfinals ===
- Jokerit - Kärpät 2:3 (2:1, 2:7, 1:2, 2:0, 0:1)
- TPS - Pelicans 3:0 (3:0, 4:0, 6:1)
- Tappara - Lukko 3:0 (3:2, 3:1, 5:3)
- HIFK - Ilves 2:3 (0:1 P, 4:2, 0:3, 3:0, 2:3)

=== Semifinal ===
- TPS - Kärpät 3:0 (6:1, 4:2, 4:1)
- Tappara - Ilves 3:0 (5:1, 4:1, 3:2 P)

=== 3rd place ===
- Ilves - Kärpät 2:0

=== Final ===
- TPS - Tappara 3:1 (4:3, 0:3, 2:1, 2:1 P)
