= Samuli Kankaanperä =

Finnish ice hockey player

- Born: March 4, 1992 (age 33); Jyväskylä, Finland
- Height: 6 ft 3 in (191 cm)
- Weight: 198 lb (90 kg; 14 st 2 lb)
- Position: Defence
- Shoots: Left
- Liiga team (P) Cur. team: JYP Jyväskylä; JYP-Akatemia (Mestis)
- NHL draft: Undrafted
- Playing career: 2010–present

Samuli Kankaanperä (born March 4, 1992) is a Finnish ice hockey defenceman. His is currently playing with JYP-Akatemia in the Finnish Mestis.

Kankaanperä made his SM-liiga debut playing with JYP Jyväskylä during the 2011–12 season.
