= JYP =

JYP may refer to:

- J.Y. Park (born 1971), South Korean singer-songwriter and record producer
  - JYP Entertainment, a K-pop record label, founded by J. Y. Park in 1997
- JYP Jyväskylä, a Finnish ice hockey team in the SM-liiga founded in 1977
  - JYP-Akatemia, an affiliated team in the Mestis league
