= Kultainen kypärä =

Finnish ice hockey award

Kultainen kypärä Golden Helmet
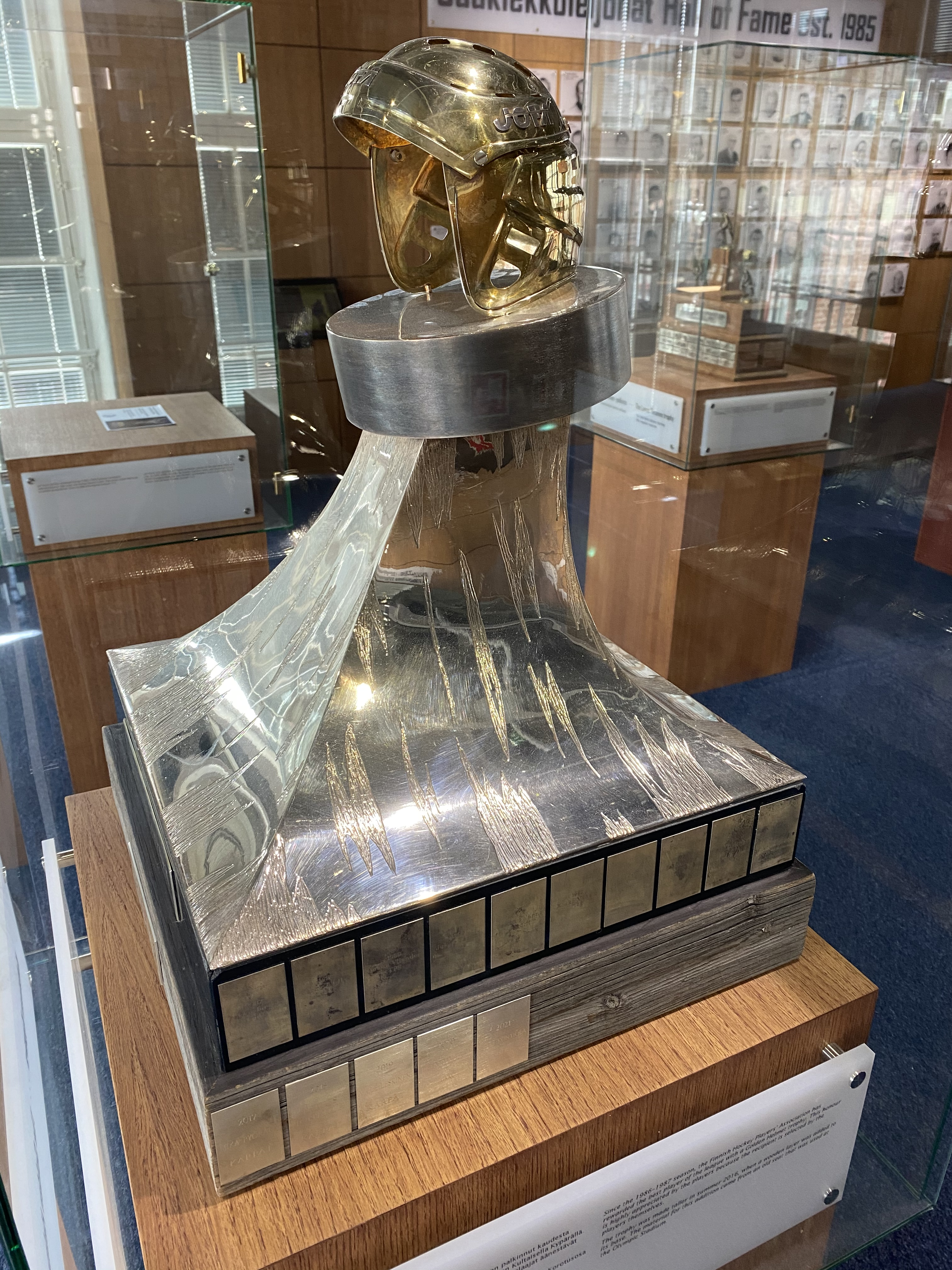
- Sport: Ice hockey
- League: Liiga & Auroraliiga
- Awarded for: Most valuable player
- Presented by: Suomen jääkiekkoilijat ry (SJRY)

History
- First award: 1987 (Liiga); 2022 (Auroraliiga)
- First winner: Liiga; Pekka Järvelä; Auroraliiga; Anni Keisala
- Most wins: Liiga; Juha Riihijärvi (2); Kimmo Rintanen (2); Auroraliiga; Elisa Holopainen (2); Emma Nuutinen (2)
- Most recent: Liiga; Benjamin Rautiainen, 2026; Auroraliiga; Emma Nuutinen, 2026

Kultainen kypärä (lit. 'the Golden Helmet') is an ice hockey award in Finland that is presented by the Suomen jääkiekkoilijat ry (SJRY; lit. 'Finnish Ice Hockey Players Association') to the most valuable player in the Liiga and Auroraliiga. Winners are selected via votes cast by each league's players. Kultainen kypärä has been awarded in the Liiga since 1987, and in the Auroraliiga since 2022.

In addition, a long running tradition by Veikkaus is for the current best scorer of a Liiga team to carry a golden helmet, also called kultainen kypärä or kultakypärä. The player that plays the most games carrying the golden helmet that also is in the top 20 of the league's scoreboard by the end of the regular season is awarded with €10,000 by Veikkaus.

== Award winners ==
=== Liiga ===
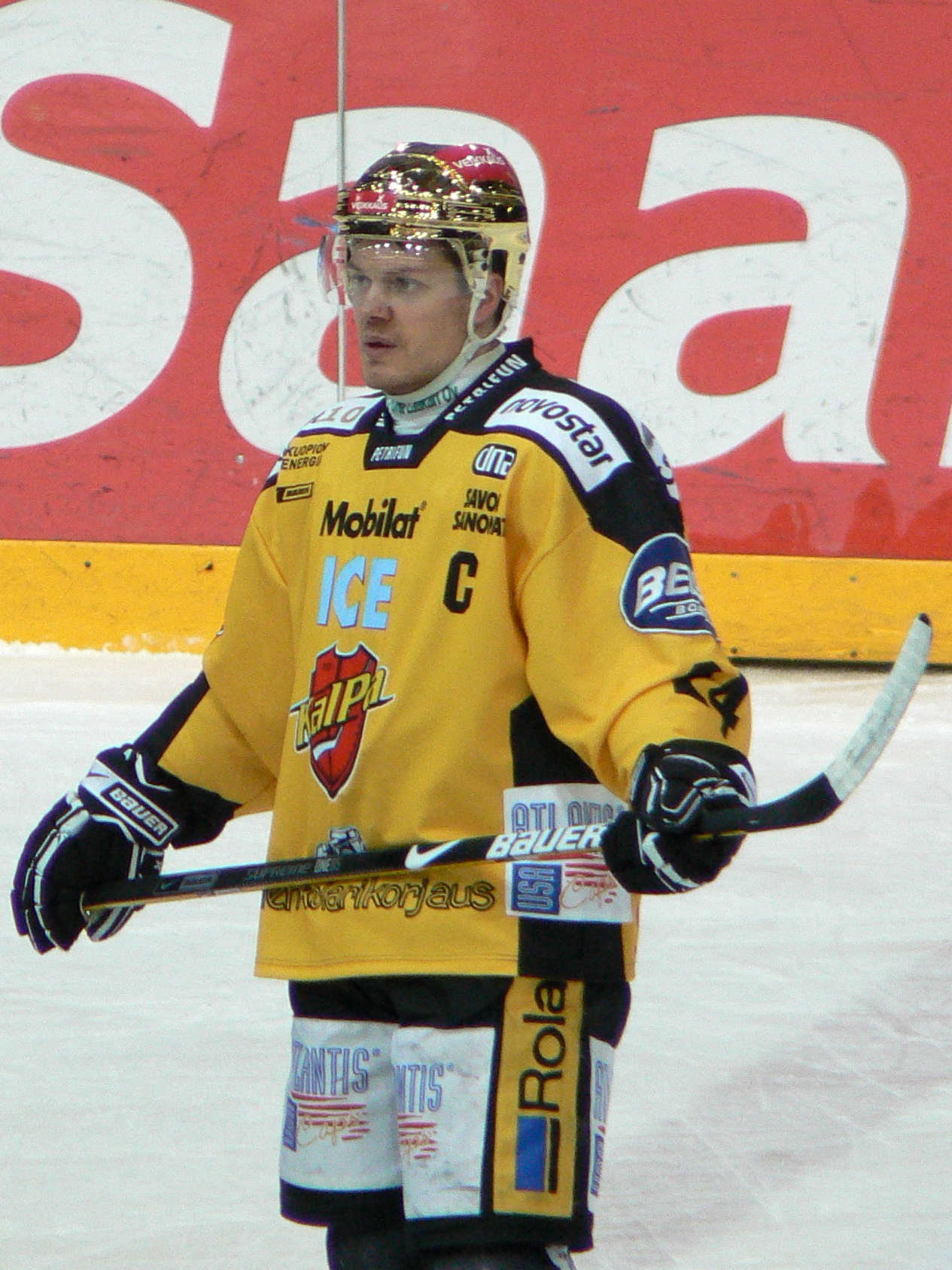
Sami Kapanen with golden helmet

- 1986-1987: (Finland) Pekka Järvelä (JYP)
- 1987-1988: (Finland) Jarmo Myllys (Lukko)
- 1988-1989: (Finland) Jukka Vilander (TPS)
- 1989-1990: (Finland) Jukka Tammi (Ilves)
- 1990-1991: (Finland) Teemu Selänne (Jokerit)
- 1991-1992: (Finland) Mikko Mäkelä (TPS)
- 1992-1993: (Finland) Juha Riihijärvi (JYP)
- 1993-1994: (Finland) Esa Keskinen (TPS)
- 1994-1995: (Finland) Saku Koivu (TPS)
- 1995-1996: (Finland) Juha Riihijärvi (Lukko)
- 1996-1997: (Finland) Kimmo Rintanen (TPS)
- 1997-1998: (Finland) Raimo Helminen (Ilves)
- 1998-1999: (United States) Brian Rafalski (HIFK)
- 1999-2000: (Finland) Kai Nurminen (TPS)
- 2000-2001: (Finland) Kimmo Rintanen, (TPS)
- 2001-2002: (Finland) Janne Ojanen (Tappara)
- 2002-2003: (Finland) Antti Miettinen (HPK)
- 2003-2004: (Finland) Timo Pärssinen (HIFK)
- 2004-2005: (United States) Tim Thomas, (Jokerit)
- 2005-2006: (Finland) Tony Salmelainen (HIFK)
- 2006-2007: (Canada) Cory Murphy (HIFK)
- 2007-2008: (Finland) Ville Leino (Jokerit)
- 2008-2009: (Finland) Juuso Riksman (Jokerit)
- 2009-2010: (Finland) Jori Lehterä (Tappara)
- 2010-2011: (Finland) Ville Peltonen (HIFK)
- 2011-2012: (Slovakia) Tomáš Záborský (Ässät)
- 2012-2013: (Finland) Ilari Filppula (Jokerit)
- 2013-2014: (Finland) Michael Keränen (Ilves)
- 2014-2015: (Finland) Kim Hirschovits (Blues)
- 2015-2016: (Finland) Kristian Kuusela (Tappara)
- 2016-2017: (Finland) Mika Pyörälä (Kärpät)
- 2017-2018: (Finland) Julius Junttila (Kärpät)
- 2018-2019: (Sweden) Malte Strömwall (KooKoo)
- 2019-2020: (Canada) Justin Danforth (Lukko)
- 2020-2021: (Finland) Petri Kontiola (HPK)
- 2021-2022: (Finland) Anton Levtchi (Tappara)
- 2022-2023: (Canada) Michael Joly (HPK)
- 2023-2024: (Finland) Jerry Turkulainen (JYP)
- 2024-2025: (Finland) Atro Leppänen (Sport)
- 2025-2026: (Finland) Benjamin Rautiainen (Tappara)

=== Auroraliiga ===
Note: Prior to the 2024–25 season, Auroraliiga was called Naisten Liiga (NSML).

- 2021–2022: (Finland) Anni Keisala (Ilves)
- 2022–2023: (Finland) Elisa Holopainen (KalPa)
- 2023–2024: (Finland) Elisa Holopainen (KalPa)
- 2024–2025: (Finland) Emma Nuutinen (Kiekko-Espoo)
- 2025–2026: (Finland) Emma Nuutinen (Kiekko-Espoo)
