= 2007 IIHF World Championship final =

Ice hockey match

	1	2	3	Total
Finland	0	0	2	2
Canada	2	1	1	4
- Date: May 13, 2007
- Arena: Khodynka Arena
- City: Moscow
- Attendance: 12,000

The 2007 IIHF World Championship final was an ice hockey match that took place on 13 May 2007 at the Khodynka Arena in Moscow, Russia, to determine the winner of the 2007 IIHF World Championship. Canada defeated Finland 4–2 to win its 24th championship.

== Background ==
The game marked the second time that Finland and Canada met in the final of a World Championship, the first time being in 1994. However only a year before in 2006 Finland had defeated Canada 5–0 in the bronze medal game. In 2007, Canada were looking on form, being undefeated coming into the playoff round, while Finland had registered two losses in the run-up to the finals.

== Venue ==
The Khodynka Arena in Moscow was determined to host the final of the championship. Previously at the tournament, the venue hosted both the semi-finals, and also the Bronze medal match. In the final, the attendance was 12,000.

== The Match ==
=== Summary ===
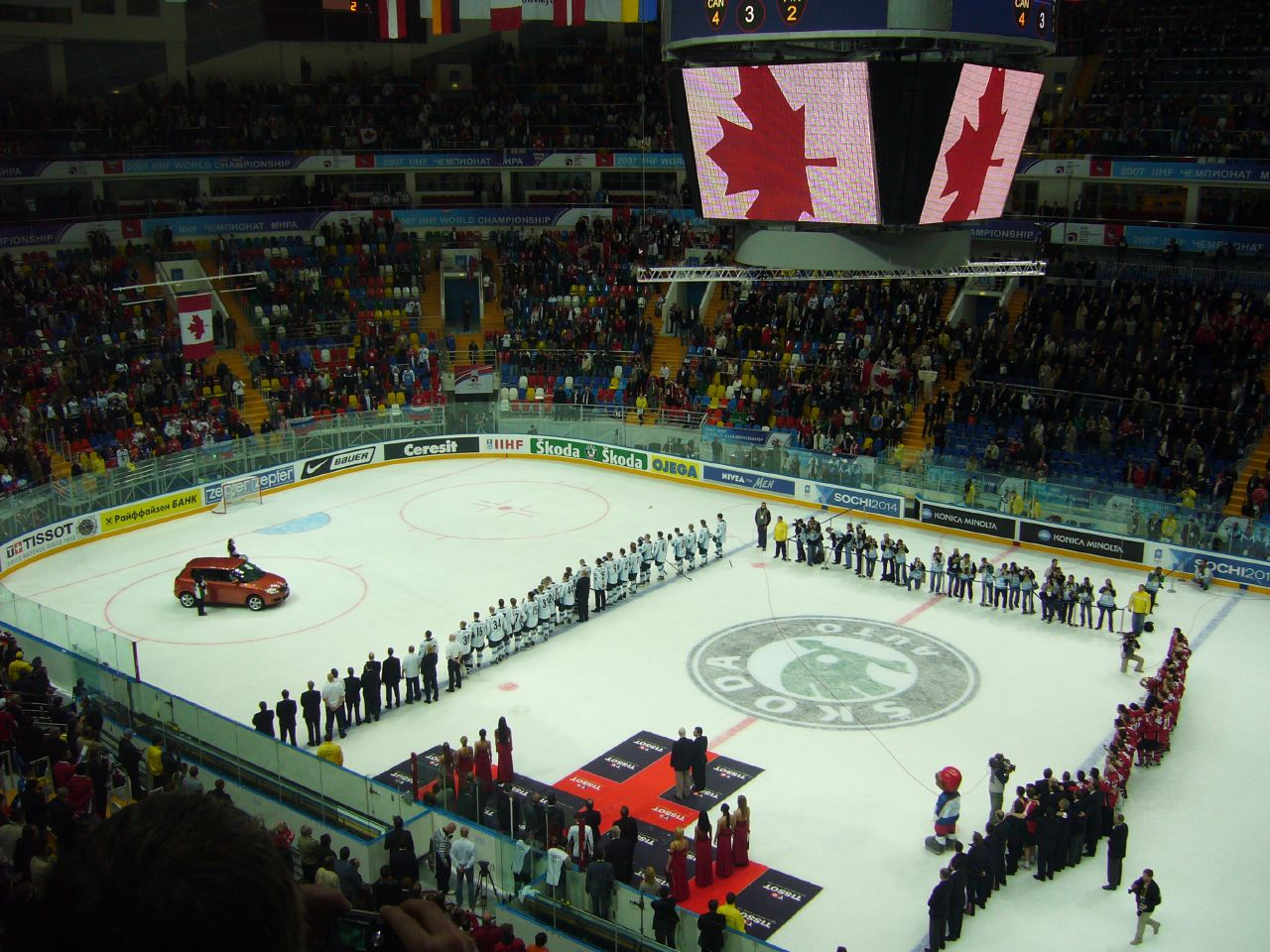
The national anthem of Canada being played after their victory.

Rick Nash scored on the powerplay at 6:10 into the first period on a one-timer from the point from a pass by Cory Murphy off of Matthew Lombardi, to put Canada up 1–0. Near the middle of the period, Eric Staal scored in similar fashion also on the powerplay, assisted by Justin Williams, and Mike Cammalleri.

9:11 into the second period, Colby Armstrong scored to give the Canadians a 3–0 lead. This goal ended up as the game winner. Finland had some discipline difficulty in the first two periods, taking 6 minutes apiece in penalties in both periods.

Finland started to bring up the pressure in the last ten minutes. Petri Kontiola scored a nice glove-side goal on Ward with 8:52 left in the third, assisted by Ville Peltonen, to put the Finns on the board. With only 2 minutes left Antti Miettinen scored to bring Finland within one, 3–2. However, only one minute later Rick Nash scored on a skillful breakaway to put the game away, 4–2 final for team Canada.

The Canadians were outshot 22–18, but the Canadian goaltender, Cam Ward, kept them in the game as he was solid between the pipes. They also were able to capitalize on the powerplay, which ended up being decisive in the Canadian win.

=== Details ===
May 13, 2007; 20:15 (MSD)	Canada	4–2 (2 – 0, 1 – 0, 1 – 2)	Finland	Khodynka Arena, Moscow; Attendance: 12,000

Game reference
R. Nash 06:10 (PP); E. Staal 13:48 (PP); C. Armstrong 29:11 (ES); R. Nash 58:54 (ES) / Goals / 51:08 (ES) P. Kontiola; 57:44 (ES) A. Miettinen

== See also ==
- 2007 IIHF World Championship
- Canada men's national ice hockey team
- Finland men's national ice hockey team
