= European Super Cup (disambiguation) =

The European Super Cup was the former name of the UEFA Super Cup, a European association football competition.

European Super Cup may also refer to:

- IIHF Super Cup, in ice hockey
- FIBA Europe Super Cup, in women's basketball

== See also ==
- Super Cup, other competitions outside Europe
