= Nummelin =

Nummelin is a Finnish surname. Notable people with the surname include:

- Petteri Nummelin (born 1972), Finnish ice hockey player
- Timo Nummelin (born 1948), Finnish footballer and ice hockey player
