= Esa Keskinen =

Finnish ice hockey player

- Born: 3 February 1965 (age 61) Ylöjärvi, Finland
- Height: 5 ft 10 in (178 cm)
- Weight: 194 lb (88 kg; 13 st 12 lb)
- Position: Center
- Shot: Right
- Played for: SM-liiga; TPS; Lukko; 1. Divisioona; FPS; Elitserien; HV71
- National team: Finland
- NHL draft: 101st overall, 1985; Calgary Flames
- Playing career: 1983–2000

Olympic medal record

Men's Ice hockey
Silver medal – second place	1988 Calgary	Ice hockey
Bronze medal – third place	1994 Lillehammer	Ice hockey

Esa Juhani Keskinen (born 3 February 1965 in Ylöjärvi, Finland) is a Finnish retired professional ice hockey forward.

== Playing career ==
Keskinen was drafted by the Calgary Flames as their fifth-round pick, 101st overall, in the 1985 NHL entry draft, but never played in the NHL anytime in his active playing career.

Playing for HV71 in the Swedish Elitserien, he won the Swedish national championship during the 1994–95 season. During the 1995–96 season Keskinen formed with his fellow Finn Kai Nurminen a proficient goal-scoring duo, still playing for HV71. During his years in HV71 he was a popular player among the fans and drew by himself large crowds to the club's, at the time, arena Rosenlundshallen.

Keskinen recorded 658 points (215 goals, 443 assists) and 130 penalty minutes in 478 games in SM-liiga playing for TPS and Lukko. In Elitserien he totalled 203 games with 209 points (61 goals, 148 assists) and 148 penalty minutes playing for HV71. He has been noted for most points in SM-liiga in seasons 1987-88 (69 points), 1992–93 (59 points) and 1993-94 (70 points).

== Awards ==
- Silver medal at the 1988 Winter Olympics.
- Awarded the Veli-Pekka Ketola trophy in 1988, 1993 and 1994.
- SM-liiga champion with TPS in 1993 and 2000.
- Awarded the Kultainen kypärä trophy in 1994.
- Awarded Lasse Oksanen trophy in 1994.
- SM-liiga Best Player of Regular Season 1993–94.
- Bronze medal at the 1994 Winter Olympics.
- Elitserien playoff winner with HV71 in 1995.
- Gold medal at the 1995 Ice Hockey World Championship.
- Awarded Guldhjälmen (Most Valuable Player) in 1996.

== Records ==
- HV71's club record for assists in one season (41)
- HV71's club record for points in one season (59)

== Career statistics ==
=== Regular season and playoffs ===
			Regular season					Playoffs
Season	Team	League	GP	G	A	Pts	PIM	GP	G	A	Pts	PIM
1980–81	KOOVEE	FIN U20	32	46	20	66	35	—	—	—	—	—
1981–82	FoPS	FIN.2	27	14	18	32	8	—	—	—	—	—
1982–83	FoPS	FIN.2	15	5	14	19	8	—	—	—	—	—
1983–84	TPS	SM-l	31	10	25	35	0	5	0	0	0	0
1984–85	TPS	SM-l	35	11	22	33	6	10	2	3	5	0
1985–86	TPS	SM-l	36	18	28	46	4	7	2	0	2	0
1986–87	TPS	SM-l	44	25	36	61	4	5	1	1	2	0
1987–88	TPS	SM-l	44	14	55	69	14	—	—	—	—	—
1988–89	Lukko	SM-l	41	24	46	70	12	—	—	—	—	—
1989–90	Lukko	SM-l	44	25	26	51	16	—	—	—	—	—
1990–91	Lukko	SM-l	44	17	51	68	14	—	—	—	—	—
1991–92	TPS	SM-l	44	24	45	69	12	3	1	1	2	0
1992–93	TPS	SM-l	44	16	43	59	12	12	1	6	7	4
1993–94	TPS	SM-l	47	23	47	70	28	11	5	4	9	4
1994–95	HV71	SEL	39	15	29	44	48	13	3	5	8	10
1995–96	HV71	SEL	39	18	41	59	18	4	0	5	5	2
1996–97	HV71	SEL	34	9	27	36	30	—	—	—	—	—
1997–98	HV71	SEL	46	16	29	45	24	3	0	4	4	0
1998–99	HV71	SEL	45	3	22	25	28	—	—	—	—	—
1999–2000	TPS	SM-l	22	8	19	27	8	11	2	5	7	4
SM-l totals			478	215	443	658	130	64	14	20	34	12
SEL totals			203	61	148	209	148	20	3	14	17	12

=== International ===
Year	Team	Event	GP	G	A	Pts	PIM
1981	Finland	EJC	5	1	2	3	19
1982	Finland	EJC	5	3	0	3	0
1983	Finland	EJC	5	5	2	7	2
1984	Finland	WJC	7	4	8	12	0
1985	Finland	WJC	7	6	14	20	2
1988	Finland	OG	8	1	1	2	2
1989	Finland	WC	10	1	8	9	2
1990	Finland	WC	10	0	4	4	8
1991	Finland	WC	10	2	5	7	4
1994	Finland	OG	8	2	4	6	6
1994	Finland	WC	7	2	3	5	2
1995	Finland	WC	8	1	5	6	6
1996	Finland	WC	6	1	3	4	2
Junior totals			29	19	26	45	23
Senior totals			67	10	33	43	32

Preceded by Juha Riihijärvi	Winner of the Kultainen kypärä trophy 1993-94	Succeeded by Saku Koivu
Preceded by Unto Wiitala	Winner of the Lasse Oksanen trophy 1993-94	Succeeded by Saku Koivu
Preceded by Kari Jalonen	Winner of the Veli-Pekka Ketola trophy 1987-88	Succeeded by Raimo Summanen
Preceded by Mikko Mäkelä	Winner of the Veli-Pekka Ketola trophy 1992-93 & 1993-94	Succeeded by Saku Koivu
