= Petri Varis =

Finnish ice hockey player

- Born: May 13, 1969 (age 57) Varkaus, Finland
- Height: 6 ft 1 in (185 cm)
- Weight: 200 lb (91 kg; 14 st 4 lb)
- Position: Left wing
- Shot: Left
- Played for: SM-l; Ässät; Jokerit; Tappara; NHL; Chicago Blackhawks; DEL; Kölner Haie; NLA; ZSC Lions
- National team: Finland
- NHL draft: 132nd overall, 1993; San Jose Sharks
- Playing career: 1988–2009

Petri Johannes Varis (born May 13, 1969) is a Finnish former professional ice hockey forward. He was drafted by the San Jose Sharks as their 6th-round pick in the 1993 NHL entry draft.

== Playing career ==
Starting his pro career with Karhu-Kissat in the Finnish first division, Varis played his first SM-liiga games with Ässät in the 1991–92 season. After two seasons with Ässät, Varis moved to Jokerit, where he finished his seventh full season in 2005.

With Jokerit, Varis won 4 Finnish championships and 2 European Cups.

In 1997, Varis moved to North America, where he played a season with the Indianapolis Ice in the IHL, as well as a single NHL game with the Chicago Blackhawks. He has also played in the German ice hockey league and the Swiss first and second leagues.

Varis has also represented Finland in international play.

Varis scored 268 goals in SM-Liiga. He also scored 7 goals in 7 games in European Cup.

== Awards ==
- Jarmo Wasama memorial trophy as Best Rookie - 1992
- Matti Keinonen trophy for best +/- in the regular season - 1996
- Jari Kurri trophy for best player during the playoffs - 1996
- Aarne Honkavaara trophy for best goal scorer - 1997
- Veli-Pekka Ketola trophy for most points scored - 1997 and 2001.

== Records ==
- SM-liiga record for most goals scored in the playoffs (12).
- Jokerit all-time scoring leader in points and goals. Second in assists.

== Career statistics ==
=== Regular season and playoffs ===
			Regular season					Playoffs
Season	Team	League	GP	G	A	Pts	PIM	GP	G	A	Pts	PIM
1986–87	Karhu-Kissat	FIN U18	16	9	15	24	24	—	—	—	—	—
1986–87	Karhu-Kissat	FIN U20	2	0	1	1	0	—	—	—	—	—
1987–88	Karhu-Kissat	FIN U20	8	7	3	10	6	—	—	—	—	—
1987–88	Karhu-Kissat	FIN.2	42	9	15	24	21	—	—	—	—	—
1988–89	Karhu-Kissat	FIN U20	7	4	5	9	10	—	—	—	—	—
1988–89	Karhu-Kissat	FIN.2	44	18	19	37	26	—	—	—	—	—
1989–90	Karhu-Kissat	FIN.2	42	30	24	54	44	—	—	—	—	—
1990–91	KooKoo	FIN.2	44	20	31	51	42	—	—	—	—	—
1991–92	Ässät	SM-l	36	13	23	36	24	8	2	2	4	6
1992–93	Ässät	SM-l	46	14	35	49	42	8	2	2	4	12
1993–94	Jokerit	SM-l	31	14	15	29	16	11	3	4	7	6
1994–95	Jokerit	SM-l	47	21	20	41	53	11	7	2	9	10
1994–95	Haukat	FIN.2	1	0	1	1	2	—	—	—	—	—
1995–96	Jokerit	SM-l	50	28	28	56	22	11	12	7	19	6
1996–97	Jokerit	SM-l	50	36	23	59	38	9	7	4	11	14
1997–98	Chicago Blackhawks	NHL	1	0	0	0	0	—	—	—	—	—
1997–98	Indianapolis Ice	IHL	77	18	54	72	32	5	3	4	7	4
1998–99	Kölner Haie	DEL	52	10	25	35	22	5	3	0	3	4
1999–2000	Jokerit	SM-l	53	21	25	46	44	10	0	5	5	14
2000–01	Jokerit	SM-l	56	27	43	70	38	5	0	2	2	4
2001–02	Jokerit	SM-l	6	2	0	2	0	—	—	—	—	—
2001–02	ZSC Lions	NLA	9	2	2	4	6	10	3	1	4	4
2001–02	GCK Lions	CHE.2	16	6	15	21	29	2	0	0	0	8
2002–03	GCK Lions	CHE.2	28	16	21	37	16	4	1	0	1	2
2003–04	Tappara	SM-l	55	9	19	28	38	3	1	1	2	0
2004–05	Jokerit	SM-l	56	13	17	30	28	12	3	4	7	10
2005–06	Jokerit	SM-l	56	18	13	31	56	—	—	—	—	—
2006–07	Jokerit	SM-l	54	17	28	45	56	10	0	4	4	4
2007–08	Jokerit	SM-l	28	3	8	11	16	13	3	2	5	0
2008–09	Jokerit	SM-l	14	0	0	0	4	3	0	0	0	2
SM-l totals			638	236	297	533	475	114	40	39	79	88

=== International ===
Year	Team	Event	GP	G	A	Pts	PIM
1994	Finland	OG	5	1	1	2	2
1997	Finland	WC	8	2	3	5	2
Senior totals			13	3	4	7	4

== See also ==
- List of players who played only one game in the NHL

Preceded by Janne Grönvall	Winner of the Jarmo Wasama memorial trophy 1991–92	Succeeded by Juha Lind
Preceded by Veli-Pekka Kautonen	Winner of the Matti Keinonen trophy 1995–96	Succeeded by Kimmo Timonen
Preceded by Juha Riihijärvi	Winner of the Veli-Pekka Ketola trophy 1996–97	Succeeded by Peter Larsson
Preceded by Kai Nurminen	Winner of the Veli-Pekka Ketola trophy 2000–01	Succeeded by Janne Ojanen
Preceded by Juha Riihijärvi	Winner of the Aarne Honkavaara trophy 1996–97	Succeeded by Dale McTavish
Preceded by Saku Koivu	Winner of the Jari Kurri trophy 1995–96	Succeeded by Otakar Janecký
Preceded by Juha Lind	Jokerit captains September 2005 - November 2005	Succeeded by Marko Jantunen
Preceded by Marko Jantunen	Jokerit captains December 2005 -	Succeeded by current
