= Juha Riihijärvi =

Finnish ice hockey player

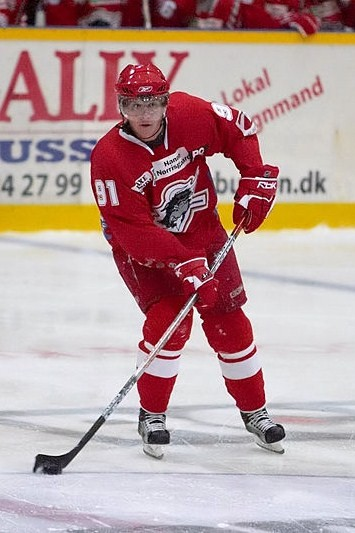
- Born: 15 December 1969 (age 56) Keminmaa, Finland
- Height: 6 ft 2 in (188 cm)
- Weight: 203 lb (92 kg; 14 st 7 lb)
- Position: Left winger
- Shot: Right
- Serie A team Former teams: Bolzano-Bozen Foxes; Oddset Ligaen; Rødovre Mighty Bulls; SM-liiga; Kärpät; JyP-HT; Lukko; Elitserien; Malmö IF; Nationalliga A HC Ambri-Piotta; Nationalliga B EHC Basel; IHL; Cape Breton Oilers
- NHL draft: 254th overall, 1991; Edmonton Oilers
- Playing career: 1987–2010

Juha Riihijärvi (born 15 December 1969 in Keminmaa, Finland) is a Finnish former professional ice hockey left winger who played his last season for Bolzano-Bozen Foxes in Italian Serie A.

== Playing career ==
=== Career in Finland ===
Juha Riihijärvi played 4 seasons for Kärpät which is a team based in Oulu, Finland. After Kärpät, Riihijärvi played 2 seasons for JYP, where he won one bronze and one silver during his time with the Jyväskylä team.

=== Short visit to North America ===
Riihijärvi was drafted to National Hockey League by Edmonton Oilers in 1991 and was part of the Oilers organization for one season, 1993–94.

Riihijärvi did not get a chance in the NHL and settled playing for Oilers-affiliate, Cape Breton Oilers in the IHL for the whole season. Riihijärvi scored 25 points in 57 games for Cape Breton.

=== Return to Finland ===
After his short-lived NHL-attempt, Riihijärvi returned to Finland and played two seasons for Lukko. During his second season in Rauma, Riihijärvi won the goalscoring, pointscoring and MVP trophies while Lukko won Bronze, making it the third medal for Riihijärvi in SM-liiga.

=== Career in Sweden ===
After his good 1995/96 season in Lukko, Riihijärvi moved to Sweden and started to play for Malmö IF in the Elitserien. Riihijärvi would go on and establish himself as one of the franchise names for the Malmö team as he played a total of 470 games for the Redhawks in 7 seasons.

=== Visit to Switzerland ===
Riihijärvi played the 2004/05 season in Switzerland and his teams were HC Ambri-Piotta in the Nationalliga A and EHC Basel in Nationalliga B.

=== Final seasons in Sweden ===
Riihijärvi returned to Sweden after he played the season in Switzerland and played two more seasons for Malmö IF.

Riihijärvi and Malmö Redhawks gained promotion from HockeyAllsvenskan to Elitserien in 2006, but were again in Relegation series in 2007.

=== Move to Denmark ===
For 2007/08 season, Riihijärvi was contracted to Danish Oddset Ligaen-team Rødovre Mighty Bulls. After playing for Bolzano-Bozen Foxes during season 2009/2010, Rihijärvi retired from hockey.

Eliteprospects - Riihijärvi classified as retired

== International career ==
Juha Riihijärvi
Medal record

Representing Finland

Men's ice hockey

World Championships
Silver medal – second place	1992 Czechoslovakia	Ice hockey

Riihijärvi has played for Finnish national team in 133 games.

Riihijärvi's international highlight came in 1992 World Championship tournament where he was part of the team which won Finland's first World Championship-medal, a silver one.

Riihijärvi also played in 1993 and 1996 tournaments but Finland did not get any medals from them. Riihijärvi's latest international call-up's are from 2000, when he played in the Euro Hockey Tour.

== Career statistics ==
=== Regular season and playoffs ===
			Regular season					Playoffs
Season	Team	League	GP	G	A	Pts	PIM	GP	G	A	Pts	PIM
1987–88	Kärpät	SM-l	1	0	0	0	0	—	—	—	—	—
1988–89	Kärpät	SM-l	44	11	23	34	22	—	—	—	—	—
1989–90	Kärpät	FIN.2	44	38	45	83	32	—	—	—	—	—
1990–91	Kärpät	FIN.2	42	29	41	70	34	—	—	—	—	—
1991–92	JYP	SM-l	38	29	33	62	37	10	4	4	8	10
1992–93	JYP	SM-l	41	25	31	56	38	9	4	2	6	2
1993–94	Cape Breton Oilers	AHL	57	10	15	25	26	—	—	—	—	—
1994–95	Lukko	SM-l	32	14	26	40	20	9	2	6	8	4
1995–96	Lukko	SM-l	50	28	44	72	58	8	3	6	9	4
1996–97	MIF Redhawks	SEL	49	27	24	51	28	4	1	0	1	8
1997–98	MIF Redhawks	SEL	45	14	25	39	26	—	—	—	—	—
1998–99	MIF Redhawks	SEL	37	13	15	28	24	8	5	5	10	6
1999–2000	MIF Redhawks	SEL	48	20	36	56	26	6	0	3	3	12
2000–01	MIF Redhawks	SEL	50	22	32	54	26	9	4	6	10	16
2001–02	MIF Redhawks	SEL	50	20	17	37	14	3	1	1	2	0
2002–03	MIF Redhawks	SEL	50	14	28	42	10	—	—	—	—	—
2003–04	Malmö Redhawks	SEL	50	13	22	35	32	—	—	—	—	—
2004–05	EHC Basel	CHE.2	30	22	20	42	22	10	10	10	20	6
2004–05	HC Ambrì–Piotta	NLA	2	0	1	1	0	—	—	—	—	—
2005–06	Malmö Redhawks	SWE.2	41	13	26	39	28	10	4	7	11	10
2006–07	Malmö Redhawks	SEL	51	11	14	25	18	—	—	—	—	—
2007–08	Rødovre Mighty Bulls	DNK	43	22	36	58	28	7	3	4	7	6
2008–09	Vienna Capitals	AUT	47	28	29	57	16	10	2	2	4	8
2009–10	HC Bolzano	ITA	31	11	16	27	14	8	2	5	7	2
SM-l totals			206	107	157	264	175	36	13	18	31	20
SEL totals			430	154	213	367	204	30	11	15	26	42

=== International ===
Year	Team	Event	GP	G	A	Pts	PIM
1992	Finland	WC	8	4	1	5	2
1993	Finland	WC	6	1	2	3	2
1996	Finland	WC	6	2	0	2	4
1996	Finland	WCH	4	0	4	4	0
Senior totals			24	7	7	14	8

Preceded by Mikko Mäkelä	Winner of the Kultainen kypärä 1992–93	Succeeded by Esa Keskinen
Preceded by Saku Koivu	Winner of the Kultainen kypärä 1995–96	Succeeded by Kimmo Rintanen
Preceded by Kai Nurminen	Winner of the Aarne Honkavaara trophy 1995–96	Succeeded by Petri Varis
Preceded by Saku Koivu	Winner of the Veli-Pekka Ketola trophy 1995–96	Succeeded by Petri Varis
Preceded by Saku Koivu	Winner of the Lasse Oksanen trophy 1995–96	Succeeded by Jani Hurme
