= Saku Koivu =

Finnish ice hockey player (born 1974)

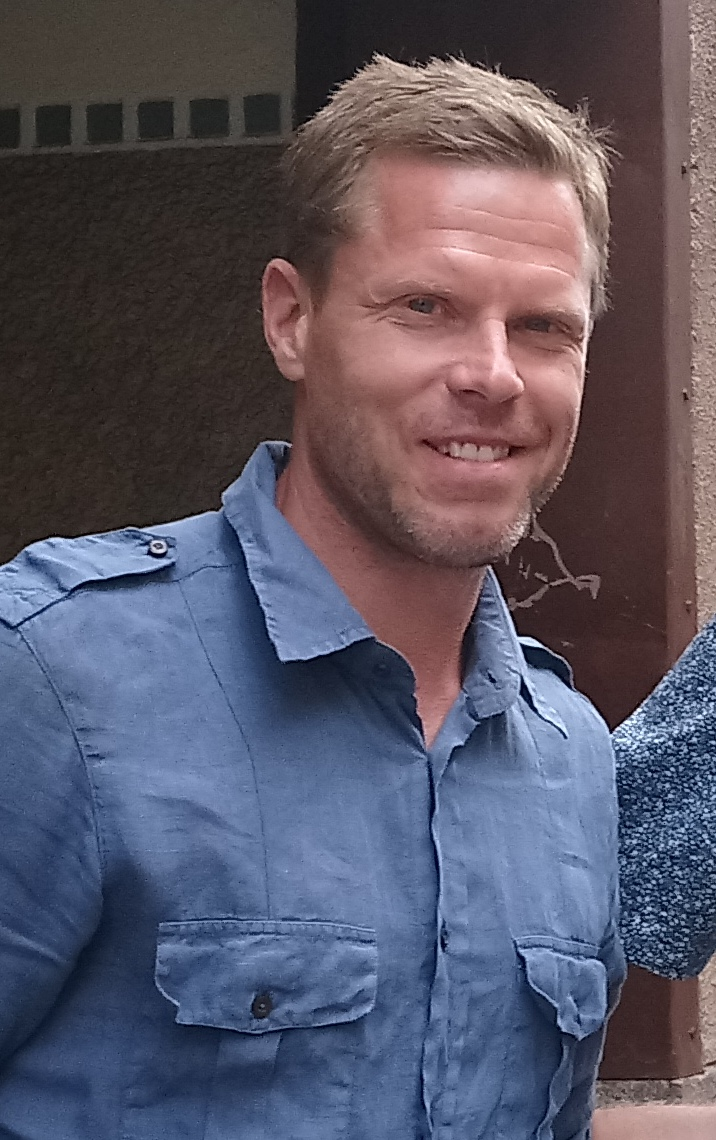
- Koivu in 2019
- Born: November 23, 1974 (age 51) Turku, Finland
- Height: 5 ft 10 in (178 cm)
- Weight: 181 lb (82 kg; 12 st 13 lb)
- Position: Centre
- Shot: Left
- Played for: TPS; Montreal Canadiens; Anaheim Ducks
- National team: Finland
- NHL draft: 21st overall, 1993; Montreal Canadiens
- Playing career: 1992–2014
Medal record
Men's ice hockey
Representing Finland
Olympic Games
Silver medal – second place	2006 Turin
Bronze medal – third place	1994 Lillehammer
Bronze medal – third place	1998 Nagano
Bronze medal – third place	2010 Vancouver
World Championships
Gold medal – first place	1995 Sweden
Silver medal – second place	1994 Italy
Silver medal – second place	1999 Norway
Bronze medal – third place	2008 Canada
World Cup
Silver medal – second place	2004 World Cup of Hockey

Saku Antero Koivu (pronounced [ˈsɑku ˈkoi̯ʋu]; born 23 November 1974) is a Finnish former professional ice hockey player who played in the National Hockey League (NHL). He began his NHL career with the Montreal Canadiens in 1995–96 after three seasons with TPS of the Finnish SM-liiga. Koivu served as the Canadiens' captain for ten of his 14 years with the club, making his captaincy tenure the longest in the team's history, tied with Jean Béliveau. Koivu was the first European player to captain the Canadiens. He also served as captain of the Finnish national men's ice hockey team from 1998 to 2010, and was inducted into IIHF Hall of Fame in 2017.HC TPS retired Saku's number 11 on 2026

== Playing career ==
=== TPS (SM-liiga) ===
Koivu began his professional ice hockey career playing for TPS in the Finnish SM-liiga, beginning in 1992–93. He posted ten points in his rookie season, including five points in the playoffs, to help TPS to a Kanada-malja championship. After improving to 53 points the following season, he put up a league-high 73 points in 1994–95. In addition to earning the Veli-Pekka Ketola trophy as league scoring champion, Koivu was awarded the Kultainen kypärä award as the players' choice for the best player and the Lasse Oksanen trophy as league MVP. He went on to record 17 points in 13 post-season games that year to earn the Jari Kurri trophy as playoff MVP and win his second Kanada-malja trophy in three years with TPS.

Koivu would return to the TPS squad during the 2004–05 NHL lockout, scoring eight goals and eight assists in 20 games.

=== Montreal Canadiens ===
Koivu was drafted by the Montreal Canadiens in the 1993 NHL entry draft, following his rookie season in the SM-liiga, as their first round selection, 21st overall. After two more seasons with TPS, Koivu moved to North America for the 1995–96 season to join the Canadiens. In his first season, Koivu ranked fourth in scoring amongst NHL rookies with 45 points in 82 games. The following season, he was amongst the NHL leading scorers (13 goals and 25 assists for 38 points) before suffering a knee injury on December 7, 1996, in a game against Chicago Blackhawks. He missed 32 games that season but returned to finish with 56 points in 50 games.

The next two seasons, Koivu continued to miss time with various leg injuries. In each year, however, he managed to play in more than 60 regular season games, scoring 57 and 44 points in 1997–98 and 1998–99 respectively. With the departure of team captain Vincent Damphousse in 1998–99, Koivu was named the 27th captain for the Canadiens on September 30, 1999. He also became the first European-born captain in team history. His first season as captain, however, was cut short due to a dislocated shoulder that took him off the ice for 40 games. Upon returning, he suffered another knee injury, resulting in a shortened 24-game season, in which Koivu recorded 21 points. The next season, in 2000–01, Koivu sat out another 28 games after undergoing arthroscopic surgery on his left knee, limiting him to 47 points.

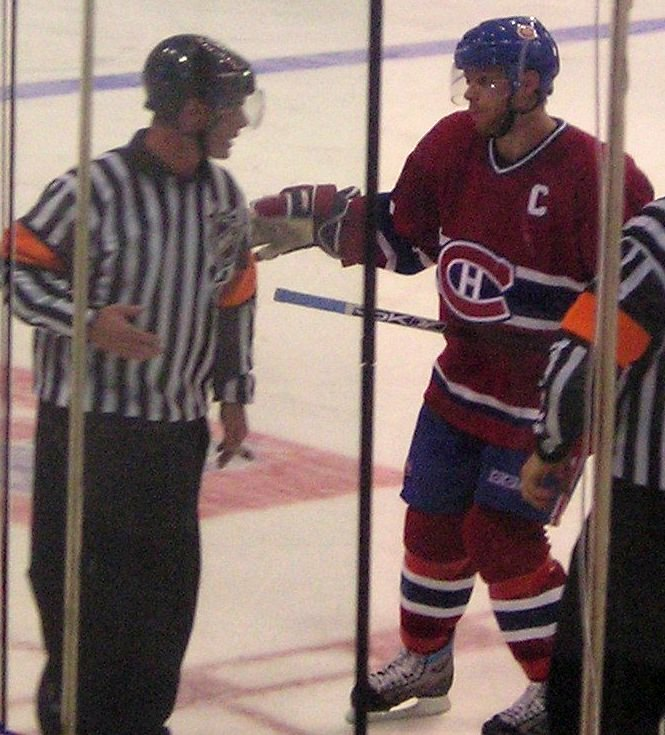
Koivu being escorted to the penalty box by two referees with the Montreal Canadiens

After six seasons in the NHL, Koivu was diagnosed with Burkitt's lymphoma, a non-Hodgkin's lymphoma. on September 6, 2001, and missed nearly the entire 2001–02 season. Koivu was on his way back from Finland with Canadiens teammate Brian Savage, who said he looked pale. He was suffering serious stomach pains and vomiting and went to see the Canadiens' physician David Mulder, who, after several tests, discovered the cancer. Koivu received large numbers of get-well e-mails and letters from fans and was also in touch with Mario Lemieux and John Cullen; hockey centres who had beaten cancer and made successful returns to the NHL.

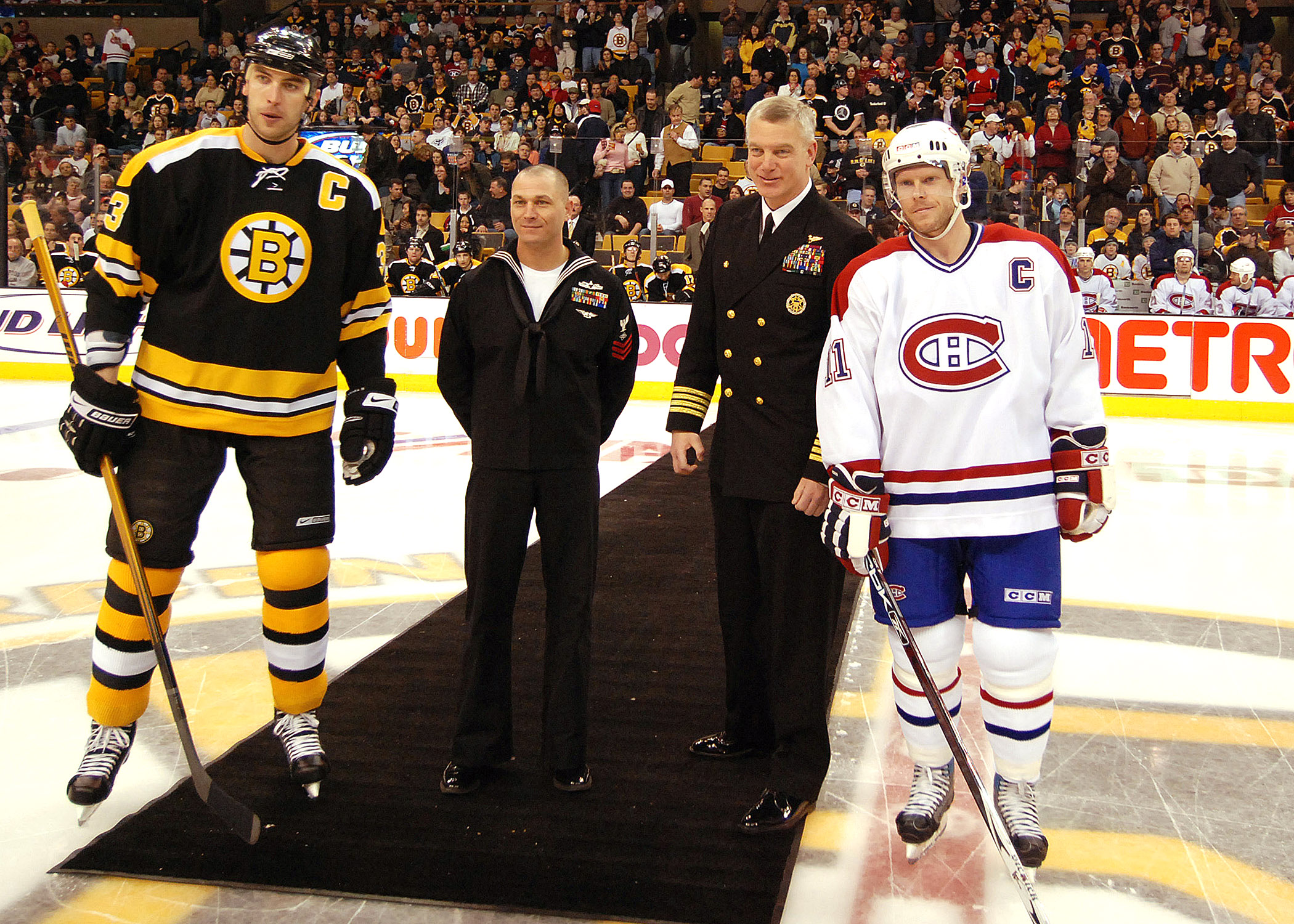
Zdeno Chára and Saku Koivu

Koivu was expected to be out for the season but made a remarkable comeback in time for the last few games. Fans gave Koivu an eight-minute standing ovation when he skated onto the Molson Centre ice for the first time on April 9, 2002, in the team's 80th game of the season. Koivu helped the team to gain a playoff spot and they went on to beat the top-seeded Boston Bruins in six games. For his courage and off-ice team leadership while undergoing cancer treatment, he was awarded the Bill Masterton Memorial Trophy following the 2002 playoffs. He followed up in 2002–03 by scoring what was then a career-best 71 points (21 goals and 50 assists).

Koivu suffered further knee problems in 2003–04 and was forced to miss 13 games. During the 2004–05 NHL lockout, he returned to Finland to play for TPS, whose head coach at the time was his father, Jukka Koivu. He was joined in Turku by Canadiens teammate Craig Rivet. When NHL play resumed in 2005–06, Koivu returned to the Canadiens to tally 62 points in 72 games. On April 26, 2006, however, during a home playoff game against the Carolina Hurricanes, Koivu sustained a serious injury to his left eye; Hurricanes forward Justin Williams attempted to lift Koivu's stick but instead struck him in the eye. Koivu was rushed to the hospital, where he would remain overnight and for the remainder of the playoffs. He remained out of the lineup for the rest of the series and underwent surgery to repair a detached retina during the off-season.

Koivu has admitted to having lost some degree of peripheral vision out of the injured eye which he will likely never regain. As well, a small cataract developed following the retinal re-attachment surgery that was later successfully removed. He has since opted to wear a larger style of visor than he had previously worn.

Koivu's play the next season demonstrated that he could still complement his linemates with seemingly no adverse impact to his performance. He reached the 500-point mark for his NHL career on January 9, 2007, in a game in which the Montreal Canadiens defeated the Atlanta Thrashers 4–2. With 2:47 remaining in regulation, Koivu fed Michael Ryder with a pass across the slot for a power play goal, prompting a standing ovation for Koivu from the sellout crowd of 21,273 in Montreal. He went on to score 22 goals and 53 assists in 81 games, totaling 75 points, to surpass his previous career-high. At the season's annual awards banquet, Koivu was announced as the winner of the King Clancy Trophy for his role in the cancer-fighting Saku Koivu Foundation. The Canadiens' team doctor, Dr. David Mulder, received the award on Koivu's behalf as he was not present. Waiting until the end of the season, Koivu underwent further surgery to his eye and also tried a contact lens design to counteract the cataract's effects.

Early in the 2007–08 season in October, Koivu was criticized by nationalist lawyer Guy Bertrand for not speaking French in a videotaped pre-game ceremony. Although Koivu is fluent in English, Swedish and Finnish, he speaks limited French and is apprehensive about using it in public. He replied to Bertrand's remarks that he is not perfect, and jokingly mentioned that he speaks French to his wife during intimate moments. Koivu introduced his team in the next pre-game video with the phrase "Ici Saku Koivu, voici mon équipe" ("Saku Koivu here, this is my team"). Later that season, in NHL.com's March 2008 edition of Impact! Magazine, Brian Compton listed the ten best captains of all-time since Steve Yzerman was first named captain of the Detroit Red Wings in 1986; Koivu was included in the article in tenth place, behind the likes of Mark Messier and Mario Lemieux. He finished the season with 56 points. In the subsequent 2008 playoffs, Koivu missed a few games with a broken foot. Nevertheless, he contributed 9 points in 7 games.

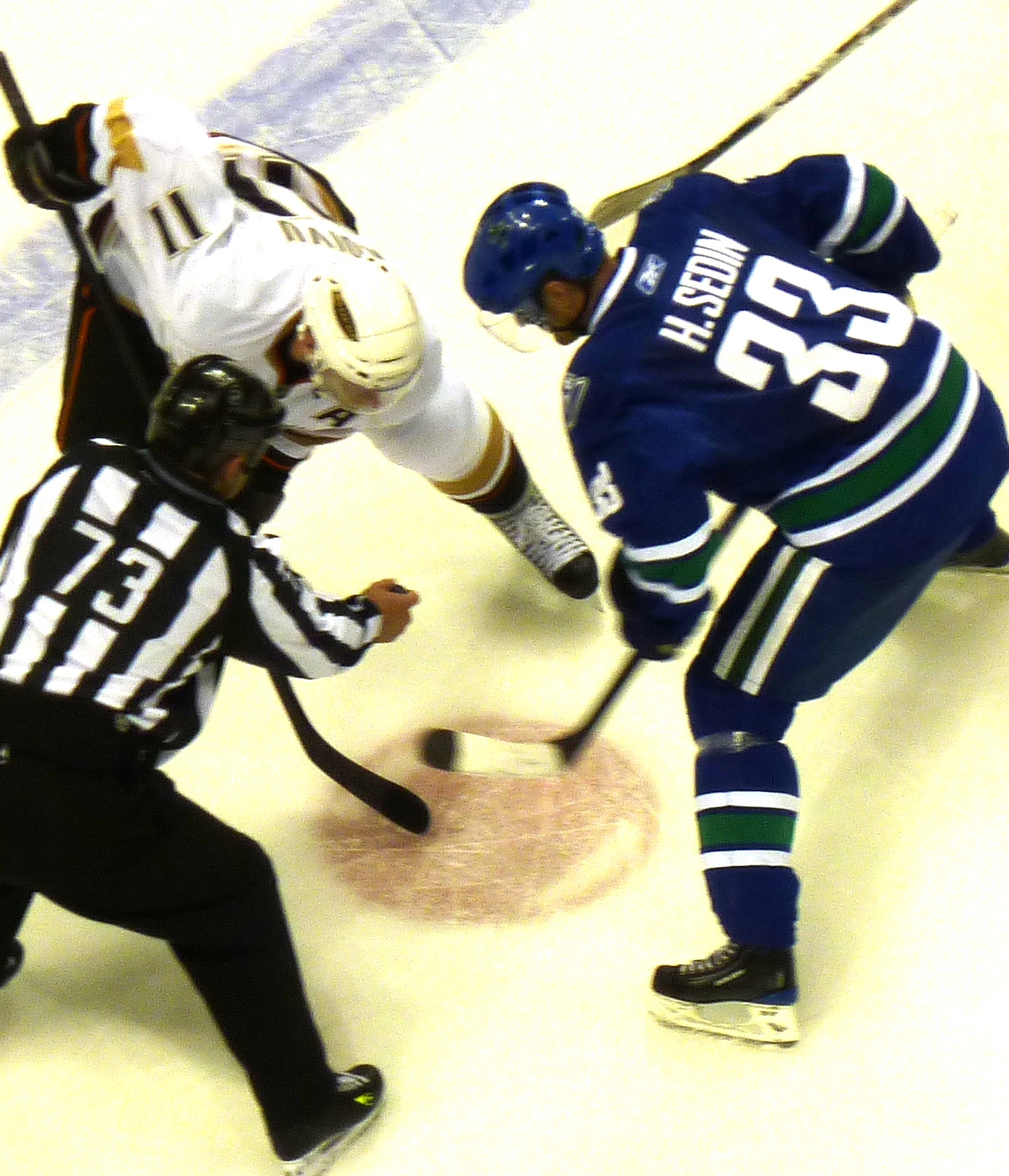
Koivu faces off with Henrik Sedin of the Vancouver Canucks in 2009

On October 18, 2008, Koivu moved up to seventh on the Canadiens' all-time assists list, surpassing Maurice "Rocket" Richard in a game against the Phoenix Coyotes; Koivu netted one and assisted on two from newly acquired linemate Alex Tanguay when the Habs beat Coyotes 4–1. Koivu reached another milestone with his 600th career point the following game against the Florida Panthers on October 20, 2008.

=== Anaheim Ducks ===
Upon the conclusion of the 2008–09 season, Koivu tied Jean Béliveau as the longest-serving captain in team history, having held the position for ten years. Koivu's tenure ended a ten-year period from 1999 to 2009 in which six Canadiens team captains had previously been traded away. Becoming an unrestricted free agent in the off-season, Koivu and the Canadiens parted ways after 14 years, where on July 8, 2009, he signed a one-year, $3.25 million deal with the Anaheim Ducks, playing alongside countryman and fellow NHL veteran Teemu Selänne. Koivu was named an alternate captain of the Ducks alongside Ryan Getzlaf before the 2009–10 season began. He made his Ducks debut on opening night, October 3, 2009, in a 4–1 loss to the San Jose Sharks. Koivu scored his first goal for Anaheim in the next game on October 6, a 4–3 loss to the Minnesota Wild. Koivu's goal came on the power play in the second period, assisted by James Wisniewski and Ryan Whitney. He registered his first multi-point game on November 5 in a 4–0 victory over the Nashville Predators.

Following the 2009–10 season in which Koivu registered his seventh straight 50-point season, Koivu re-signed with the Ducks for two more seasons. He continued to serve as an alternate captain for the Ducks alongside Selänne.

On January 22, 2011, during the 2010–11 season, Koivu made his first return to Montreal as a member of the Ducks, and was welcomed by a standing ovation.

On March 12, 2012, Koivu played in his 1,000th career NHL game, a 4–3 overtime loss to the Colorado Avalanche. He re-signed with the Ducks to a one-year contract on July 4, 2013.

On October 24, 2013, Koivu returned to Montreal for a second time as a Duck, and was once again welcomed by a standing ovation in what would be his last game at the Bell Centre. In the 2013–14 season, Koivu appeared in 65 regular season games while recording 29 points (11 goals and 18 assists). On June 19, 2014, the Ducks announced that they would not be offering Koivu a contract for the 2014–15 season, making him a free agent. On September 10, 2014, Koivu announced his retirement from the NHL after 18 seasons in the league.

== International play ==
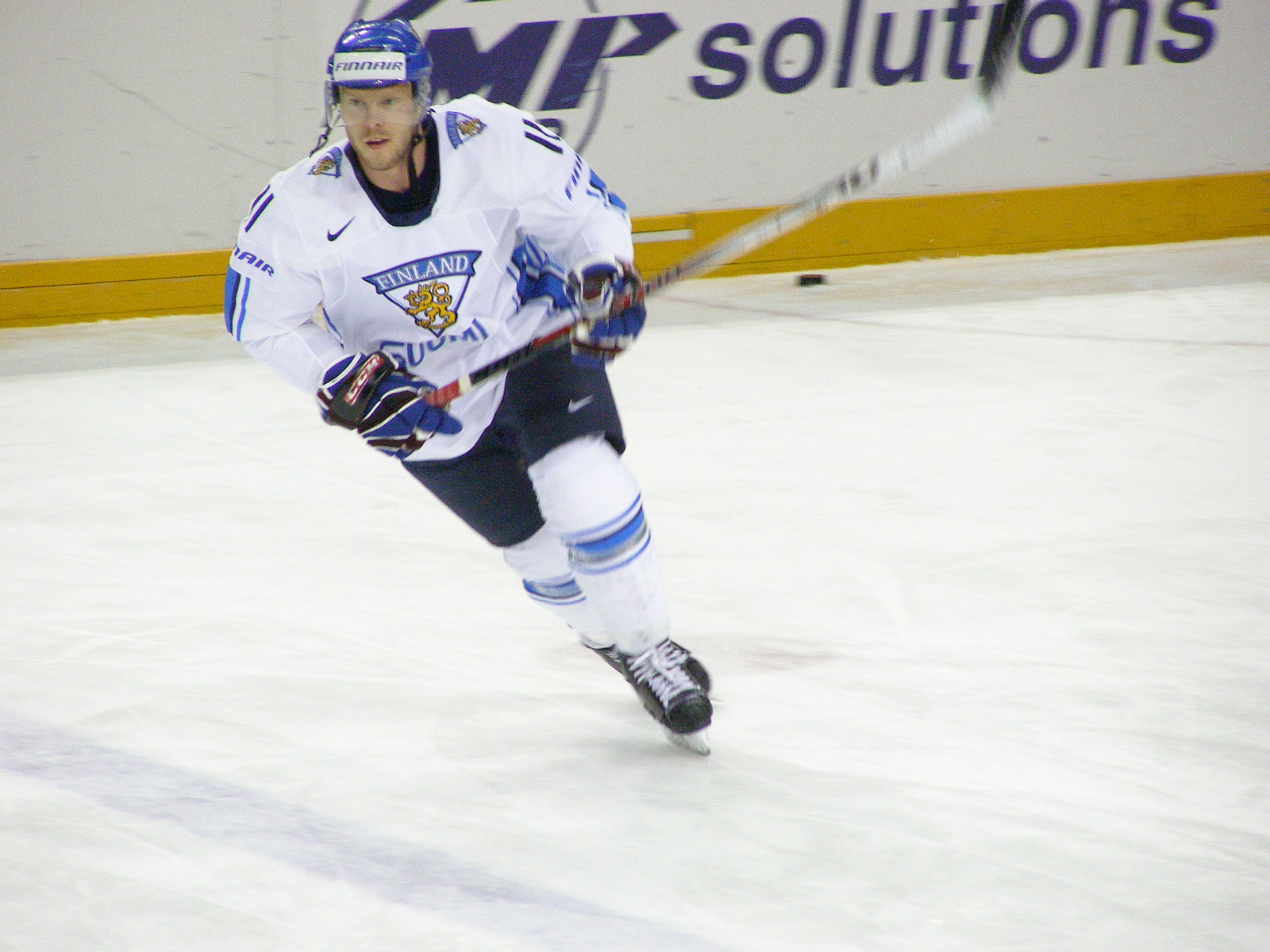
Koivu at the 2008 IIHF World Championship

Koivu has represented Finland on several occasions and was the national team's captain; he was named successor of long-time captain Timo Jutila after he retired from international play in 1997. Koivu's first duty came in 1998 when the 1998 Winter Olympics took place in Nagano. He has held the post ever since, with one exception—for the 2008 IIHF World Championship—when he joined the team in the middle of the tournament. He was offered the captaincy but declined, pleading, "It would only stir things up and the team has already a great captain, Ville Peltonen."

Koivu won a silver medal at the 2006 Winter Olympics and bronze medals at the 1994, 1998, and 2010 Winter Olympics. He was also on the 2004 World Cup team, which advanced to the final but lost against Canada, thus winning silver.

Koivu's most renowned achievement with Finland is as first line centre in the 1995 IIHF World Championship, where the Finns won their first IIHF men's gold medal. Koivu played in the first line with Jere Lehtinen and Ville Peltonen, the "Huey, Dewey and Louie" line, who were all selected as tournament all-stars.

Koivu was regularly partnered with Selänne ande Lehtinen in a line if all three were available. The trio has been a key factor to Finland's success at many bigger events. The line plays mainly to the excellent chemistry Koivu and Selänne seem to have and this has also affected the NHL; after 1999 World Championships, Selänne said in an interview on a Finnish TV program, "It would be great to play with Saku," which led to speculation about Koivu being traded to Anaheim. This finally became true a decade later when Koivu signed with Anaheim in July 2009.

On February 23, 2006, Koivu was elected by his fellow Olympic competitors as a member of the Athletes' Commission of the International Olympic Committee (IOC).

== Personal life ==
Koivu was born to Jukka and Tuire Koivu on November 23, 1974, in Turku. His younger brother Mikko is also a former ice hockey player, who played for the Minnesota Wild and the Columbus Blue Jackets. Saku Koivu and his wife Hanna have two children, a daughter, Ilona (born 2004) and a son, Aatos (born 2006). Aatos was drafted by the Canadiens in the third round (70th overall) of the 2024 NHL entry draft.

In 2008, the Montreal-based band Simple Plan featured Koivu in its video for the song "Save You." The song was about the battle with cancer of the brother of Simple Plan frontman Pierre Bouvier. Koivu is one of several cancer survivors appearing in the video.

== Awards and honors ==
=== SM-liiga ===
- Kanada-malja – 1993, 1995
- Kultainen kypärä award – 1995
- Jari Kurri trophy – 1995
- Lasse Oksanen trophy – 1995
- Veli-Pekka Ketola trophy – 1995
- President's Trophy – 1999
- Retired number 11 HC TPS 2026

=== NHL ===
- Voted to the NHL All-Star Game by the fans – 1998, 2003 (did not play due to injury)
- Bill Masterton Trophy – 2002
- King Clancy Memorial Trophy – 2007
- First ever European-born captain of the Montreal Canadiens – 1999–2009
- Longest-serving captain in Canadiens history (tied with Jean Béliveau)

=== International ===
- Ice Hockey World Championships Tournament All-Star – 1994, 1995, 1999
- Ice Hockey World Championships Tournament's Best Forward – 1995, 1999
- Ice Hockey World Championships Tournament's Top scorer – 1999
- Finnish Ice hockey player of the year – 1994, 1995
- 1998 Winter Olympics top scorer (tied with Teemu Selänne)
- 2006 Winter Olympics Tournament All-Star
- 2006 Winter Olympics top scorer (tied with Teemu Selänne)
- Captain of Finland national team – 1998–2010
- Inducted into IIHF Hall of Fame (2017)

== Career statistics ==
=== Regular season and playoffs ===
			Regular season					Playoffs
Season	Team	League	GP	G	A	Pts	PIM	GP	G	A	Pts	PIM
1990–91	TPS	FIN U20	12	3	7	10	6	—	—	—	—	—
1991–92	TPS	FIN U20	34	25	28	53	57	8	5	9	14	6
1992–93	TPS	SM-l	46	3	7	10	28	11	3	2	5	2
1993–94	TPS	SM-l	47	23	30	53	42	11	4	8	12	16
1994–95	TPS	SM-l	45	27	47	74	73	13	7	10	17	16
1995–96	Montreal Canadiens	NHL	82	20	25	45	40	6	3	1	4	8
1996–97	Montreal Canadiens	NHL	50	17	39	56	38	5	1	3	4	10
1997–98	Montreal Canadiens	NHL	69	14	43	57	48	6	2	3	5	2
1998–99	Montreal Canadiens	NHL	65	14	30	44	38	—	—	—	—	—
1999–00	Montreal Canadiens	NHL	24	3	18	21	14	—	—	—	—	—
2000–01	Montreal Canadiens	NHL	54	17	30	47	40	—	—	—	—	—
2001–02	Montreal Canadiens	NHL	3	0	2	2	0	12	4	6	10	4
2002–03	Montreal Canadiens	NHL	82	21	50	71	72	—	—	—	—	—
2003–04	Montreal Canadiens	NHL	68	14	41	55	52	11	3	8	11	10
2004–05	TPS	SM-l	20	8	8	16	28	6	3	2	5	30
2005–06	Montreal Canadiens	NHL	72	17	45	62	70	3	0	2	2	2
2006–07	Montreal Canadiens	NHL	81	22	53	75	74	—	—	—	—	—
2007–08	Montreal Canadiens	NHL	77	16	40	56	93	7	3	6	9	4
2008–09	Montreal Canadiens	NHL	65	16	34	50	44	4	0	3	3	2
2009–10	Anaheim Ducks	NHL	71	19	33	52	36	—	—	—	—	—
2010–11	Anaheim Ducks	NHL	75	15	30	45	36	6	1	6	7	6
2011–12	Anaheim Ducks	NHL	74	11	27	38	50	—	—	—	—	—
2012–13	Anaheim Ducks	NHL	47	8	19	27	18	7	1	2	3	6
2013–14	Anaheim Ducks	NHL	65	11	18	29	46	13	0	1	1	8
Liiga totals			158	61	92	153	171	41	17	22	39	64
NHL totals			1,124	255	577	832	809	79	18	41	59	60

=== International ===
Year	Team	Event	Result	GP	G	A	Pts	PIM
1992	Finland	EJC18	4th	6	3	5	8	18
1993	Finland	WJC	5th	7	1	8	9	6
1993	Finland	WC	7th	6	0	1	1	2
1994	Finland	WJC	4th	7	3	6	9	12
1994	Finland	OG	3rd place, bronze medalist(s)	8	4	3	7	12
1994	Finland	WC	2nd place, silver medalist(s)	8	5	6	11	4
1995	Finland	WC	1st place, gold medalist(s)	8	5	5	10	18
1996	Finland	WCH	QF	4	1	3	4	4
1997	Finland	WC	5th	6	2	2	4	2
1998	Finland	OG	3rd place, bronze medalist(s)	6	2	8	10	4
1999	Finland	WC	2nd place, silver medalist(s)	10	4	12	16	4
2003	Finland	WC	5th	7	1	10	11	4
2004	Finland	WCH	2nd place, silver medalist(s)	6	3	1	4	2
2006	Finland	OG	2nd place, silver medalist(s)	8	3	8	11	12
2008	Finland	WC	3rd place, bronze medalist(s)	6	0	3	3	4
2010	Finland	OG	3rd place, bronze medalist(s)	6	0	2	2	6
Junior totals				20	7	19	26	36
Senior totals				89	30	64	94	78

== See also ==
- List of NHL players with 1,000 games played
- List of family relations in the National Hockey League
- List of Olympic medalist families

Preceded by Vincent Damphousse	Montreal Canadiens captain 1999–2009	Succeeded by Brian Gionta
Preceded by Esa Keskinen	Winner of the Kultainen kypärä 1995	Succeeded by Juha Riihijärvi
Preceded by Adam Graves	Winner of the Bill Masterton Trophy; 2002	Succeeded by Steve Yzerman
Preceded by Olaf Kölzig	Winner of the King Clancy Memorial Trophy; 2007	Succeeded by Vincent Lecavalier
Preceded by David Wilkie	Montreal Canadiens first-round draft pick 1993	Succeeded by Brad Brown
Preceded by Ari Sulander	Winner of the Jari Kurri trophy 1995	Succeeded by Petri Varis
Preceded by Esa Keskinen	Winner of the Veli-Pekka Ketola trophy 1995	Succeeded by Juha Riihijärvi
Preceded by Teemu Selänne	Winner of the President's trophy 1999	Succeeded by Esa Tikkanen
