= IIHF Super Cup =

European ice hockey tournament

The IIHF Super Cup was an ice hockey event played between each winner of the two main European club tournaments of the previous season.

In 1997 it was played between the champion of the European Hockey League and the champion of the IIHF European Cup. The next three years it was played between the champion of the European Hockey League and the champion of the IIHF Continental Cup.

== IIHF Super Cup Finals ==
Season	Date	Winner	Score	Runner-up	Venue
1997	6 September 1997	(Finland) TPS	3–2	(Russia) Lada Togliatti	Turku, Finland
1998	15 November 1998	(Austria) VEU Feldkirch	4–0	(Slovakia) HC Košice	Feldkirch, Austria
1999	31 August 1999	(Switzerland) HC Ambrì-Piotta	2–0	(Russia) Metallurg Magnitogorsk	Ambrì, Switzerland
2000	29 August 2000	(Russia) Metallurg Magnitogorsk	3–2 (OT)	(Switzerland) HC Ambrì-Piotta	Magnitogorsk, Russia

== See also ==
- European Hockey League
- IIHF Continental Cup
