= Magnus Svensson (ice hockey, born 1963) =

Swedish ice hockey player

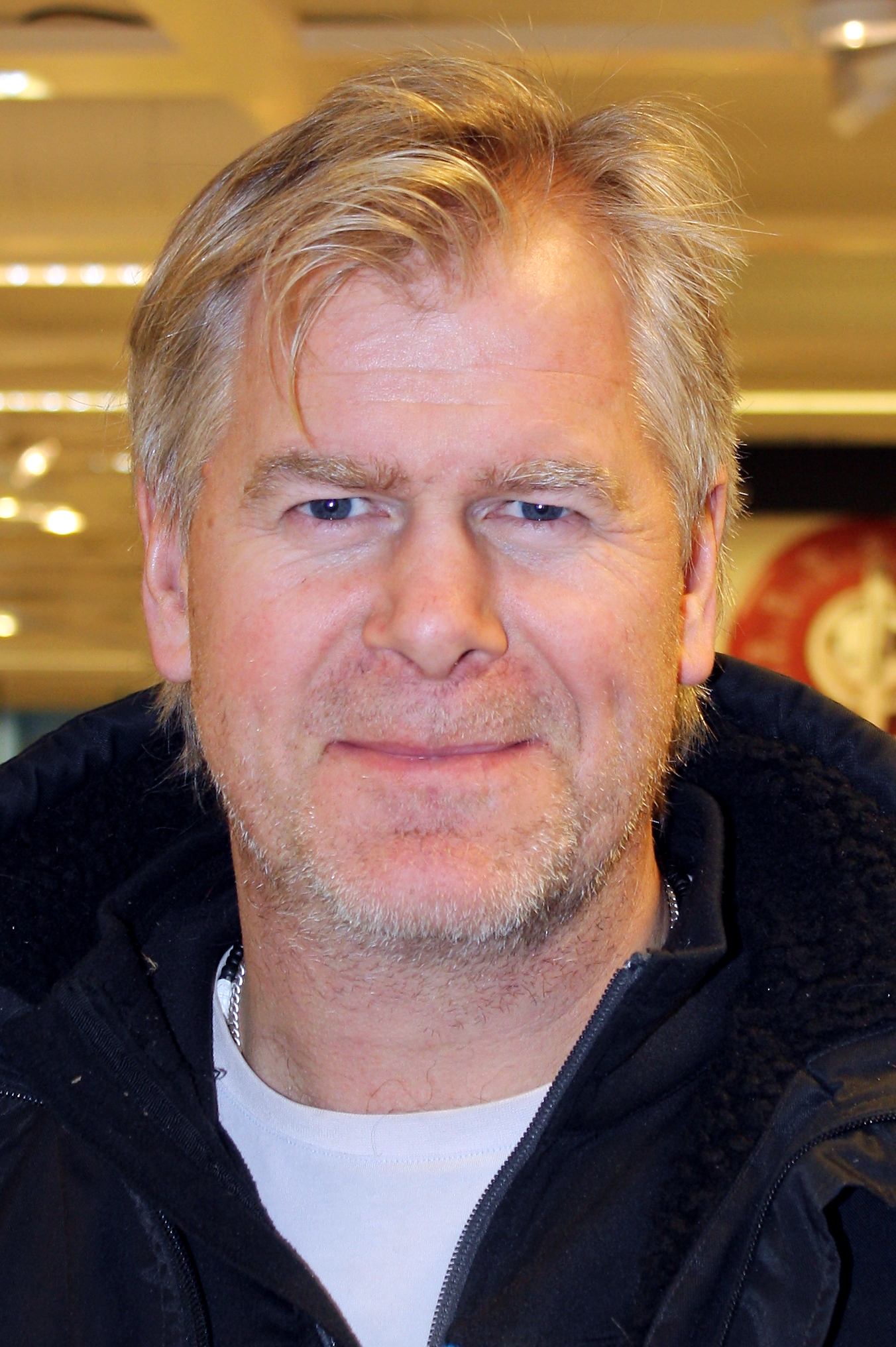
- Magnus Svensson in December 2011
- Born: 1 March 1963 (age 63) Tranås, Sweden
- Height: 5 ft 11 in (180 cm)
- Weight: 180 lb (82 kg; 12 st 12 lb)
- Position: Defence
- Shot: Left
- Played for: Leksands IF; HC Lugano; Florida Panthers; HC Davos; SC Rapperswil-Jona
- National team: Sweden
- NHL draft: 250th overall, 1987; Calgary Flames
- Playing career: 1983–2002

Olympic medal record

Men's ice hockey
Gold medal – first place	1994 Lillehammer	Ice hockey

Magnus Svensson (born 1 March 1963) is a Swedish former professional ice hockey player. He won a gold medal with Team Sweden at the 1994 Winter Olympics. He also played 46 games in the National Hockey League with the Florida Panthers.

== Career statistics ==
=== Regular season and playoffs ===
			Regular season					Playoffs
Season	Team	League	GP	G	A	Pts	PIM	GP	G	A	Pts	PIM
1980–81	Tranås AIF	SWE.2	16	0	1	1	6	—	—	—	—	—
1981–82	Tranås AIF	SWE.3	—	—	—	—	—	—	—	—	—	—
1982–83	Leksands IF	SWE U20	—	—	—	—	—	—	—	—	—	—
1983–84	Leksands IF	SEL	35	3	8	11	18	—	—	—	—	—
1984–85	Leksands IF	SEL	35	8	7	15	22	—	—	—	—	—
1985–86	Leksands IF	SEL	36	6	9	15	62	—	—	—	—	—
1986–87	Leksands IF	SEL	33	8	16	24	42	—	—	—	—	—
1987–88	Leksands IF	SEL	40	12	11	23	20	3	0	0	0	8
1988–89	Leksands IF	SEL	39	15	22	37	40	10	3	5	8	8
1989–90	Leksands IF	SEL	26	11	12	23	58	1	0	0	0	0
1990–91	HC Lugano	NDA	36	16	19	35	44	8	3	3	6	22
1991–92	Leksands IF	SEL	22	4	10	14	32	—	—	—	—	—
1991–92	Leksands IF	Allsv	18	8	8	16	28	11	7	4	11	22
1992–93	Leksands IF	SEL	37	10	17	27	36	2	0	2	2	0
1993–94	Leksands IF	SEL	39	13	16	29	22	4	3	1	4	8
1994–95	HC Davos	NDA	35	8	25	33	46	5	2	2	4	8
1994–95	Florida Panthers	NHL	19	2	5	7	10	—	—	—	—	—
1995–96	Florida Panthers	NHL	27	2	9	11	21	—	—	—	—	—
1996–97	Leksands IF	SEL	45	8	17	25	60	9	1	2	3	35
1997–98	Leksands IF	SEL	42	2	23	25	52	4	0	1	1	6
1998–99	Leksands IF	SEL	48	11	24	35	70	4	1	1	2	2
1999–2000	SC Rapperswil–Jona	NLA	42	7	25	32	44	—	—	—	—	—
2000–01	Leksands IF	SEL	50	4	6	10	52	—	—	—	—	—
2001–02	Leksands IF	Allsv	39	3	14	17	30	8	0	2	2	22
SEL totals			527	115	198	313	586	37	8	12	20	67
NDA/NLA totals			113	31	69	100	134	13	5	5	10	30
NHL totals			46	4	14	18	31	—	—	—	—	—

=== International ===
Year	Team	Event	GP	G	A	Pts	PIM
1987	Sweden	WC	2	0	0	0	4
1990	Sweden	WC	10	2	1	3	8
1994	Sweden	OG	7	4	1	5	6
1994	Sweden	WC	8	8	1	9	8
1997	Sweden	WC	10	0	6	6	16
Senior totals			37	14	9	23	42
