= Mika Lehtinen =

Finnish ice hockey player

- Born: 23 May 1975 (age 49); Turku, FIN
- Height: 5 ft 10 in (178 cm)
- Weight: 190 lb (86 kg; 13 st 8 lb)
- Position: Defence
- Shoots: Left
- Serie A team Former teams: HC Asiago; HC Milano Vipers
- Playing career: 1995–present

Mika Lehtinen (born 23 May 1975 in Turku) is a Finnish professional ice hockey defenceman currently playing for A. S. Asiago Hockey in Italy's Serie A league.

Lehtinen began his career with hometown team TPS in 1991 where he spent eleven seasons. In 2002, he moved to the Swedish Elitserien to play for Modo Hockey. He returned to Finland in 2004, signing for the Espoo Blues before returning to TPS the year after. In 2007, Lehtinen moved to Italy in the Serie A league and signed for the HC Milano Vipers and in 2008 he moved to HC Asiago.
