= 1994 Men's Ice Hockey World Championships =

1994 edition of the Men's World Ice Hockey Championships

Tournament details
- Host country: Italy
- Venues: 3 (in 3 host cities)
- Dates: 25 April – 8 May
- Teams: 12

Final positions
- Champions: Canada (20th title)
- Runners-up: Finland
- Third place: Sweden
- Fourth place: United States

Tournament statistics
- Games played: 39
- Goals scored: 267 (6.85 per game)
- Attendance: 154,210 (3,954 per game)
- Scoring leader: (Sweden) Mats Sundin 14 points

The 1994 Men's Ice Hockey World Championships was the 58th such event sanctioned by the International Ice Hockey Federation (IIHF). Teams representing 35 countries participated in several levels of competition, with an additional two national teams failing to advance from a mid-season preliminary qualifying tournament. The competition also served as qualifications for group placements in the 1995 competition.

The top Championship Group A tournament took place in Italy from 25 April to 8 May 1994, with games played in Bolzano, Canazei and Milan. Twelve teams took part, with the first round being split into two groups of six, with the four best teams from each group advancing to the quarter-finals. Canada beat Finland in a shootout to capture gold for the first time since 1961. This was Canada's 20th world title in ice hockey.

Great Britain returned to Group A for the first time since 1962, but failed to even earn a point. Slovakia, Belarus, Croatia, and Estonia all debuted in Group C, the Slovaks winning the top group, the Estonians winning the bottom group that would be called Group D in two years.

== World Championship Group A (Italy) ==
=== Group 1 ===
Pos	Team	Pld	W	D	L	GF	GA	GD	Pts
1	Canada	5	5	0	0	24	7	+17	10
2	Russia	5	4	0	1	30	7	+23	8
3	Italy	5	3	0	2	17	15	+2	6
4	Austria	5	1	1	3	15	15	0	3
5	Germany	5	1	1	3	9	14	−5	3
6	Great Britain	5	0	0	5	7	44	−37	0

25 April	Italy	1–4	Canada	Bolzano

25 April	Austria	2–2	Germany	Bolzano

26 April	Great Britain	3–12	Russia	Bolzano

26 April	Canada	6–1	Austria	Bolzano

27 April	Great Britain	0–4	Germany	Bolzano

27 April	Italy	0–7	Russia	Bolzano

28 April	Canada	3–2	Germany	Bolzano

29 April	Austria	1–4	Russia	Bolzano

29 April	Italy	10–2	Great Britain	Bolzano

30 April	Germany	0–6	Russia	Bolzano

30 April	Canada	8–2	Great Britain	Bolzano

1 May	Italy	3–1	Austria	Bolzano

2 May	Italy	3–1	Germany	Bolzano

2 May	Russia	1–3	Canada	Bolzano

3 May	Great Britain	0–10	Austria	Bolzano

=== Group 2 ===
Pos	Team	Pld	W	D	L	GF	GA	GD	Pts
1	Finland	5	4	1	0	29	11	+18	9
2	Sweden	5	3	1	1	22	11	+11	7
3	United States	5	3	0	2	21	19	+2	6
4	Czech Republic	5	1	2	2	15	17	−2	4
5	France	5	1	0	4	8	25	−17	2
6	Norway	5	0	2	3	9	21	−12	2

25 April	Sweden	3–3	Norway	Canazei

25 April	Finland	4–4	Czech Republic	Canazei

25 April	France	1–5	United States	Canazei

26 April	Czech Republic	5–2	France	Canazei

27 April	United States	7–2	Norway	Canazei

27 April	Sweden	3–5	Finland	Canazei

28 April	Czech Republic	3–5	United States	Canazei

28 April	France	0–6	Sweden	Canazei

29 April	Norway	1–5	Finland	Canazei

30 April	France	1–8	Finland	Canazei

30 April	Czech Republic	2–2	Norway	Canazei

30 April	United States	2–6	Sweden	Canazei

2 May	Norway	1–4	France	Canazei

2 May	United States	2–7	Finland	Canazei

- American Bill Lindsay tested positive for ephedrine so official records indicate a final score of 7–0, however they also still add the two goals into the team totals.

2 May	Sweden	4–1	Czech Republic	Canazei

=== Playoff round ===
Quarterfinals
5 May
Finland	10
Austria	0
5 May
Russia	1
United States	3
5 May
Sweden	7
Italy	2
5 May
Canada	3
Czech Republic	2

Semifinals
7 May
Finland	8
United States	0
7 May
Sweden	0
Canada	6

Final
8 May
Finland	1
Canada (GWS)	2
Third place
8 May
Sweden	7
United States	2

=== Quarterfinals ===
5 May	Russia	1–3	United States	Milan

5 May	Sweden	7–2	Italy	Milan

5 May	Canada	3–2	Czech Republic	Milan

5 May	Finland	10–0	Austria	Milan

=== Consolation round 11–12 place ===
6 May	Great Britain	2–5	Norway	Bolzano

Referee:
(United States) Daniel Murphy

	0–1	13:22 – Geir Hoff
	0–2	15:56 – Anders Myrvold
Ian Cooper – 28:09	1–2
Richard Fera – 36:38	2–2
	2–3	52:13 – Morten Finstad
	2–4	52:46 – Espen Knutsen
	2–5	53:51 – Jörgen Salsten

=== Semifinals ===
7 May	Finland	8–0	United States	Milan

7 May	Sweden	0–6	Canada	Milan

=== Match for third place ===
8 May	Sweden	7–2	United States	Milan

=== Final ===
8 May; 20:00	Finland	1–2 (GWS) (0–0, 0–0, 1–1)	Canada	Milan

	Referee: (Slovakia) Danko; Linesmen: (United States) Burt (Russia) Karabanov
Esa Keskinen – 46:51 / 1–0; / 1–1 / 55:17 − Rod Brind’Amour	Referee: (Slovakia) Danko; Linesmen: (United States) Burt (Russia) Karabanov

== World Championship Group B (Denmark) ==
Played in Copenhagen and Aalborg 7–17 April. As in Group C1, a two to one score on the final day sealed victory over a former Soviet nation. This time Switzerland narrowly defeated Latvia.

Pos	Team	Pld	W	D	L	GF	GA	GD	Pts
13	Switzerland	7	6	1	0	52	9	+43	13
14	Latvia	7	6	0	1	61	9	+52	12
15	Poland	7	5	1	1	45	21	+24	11
16	Japan	7	3	1	3	37	38	−1	7
17	Denmark	7	3	0	4	31	27	+4	6
18	Netherlands	7	2	1	4	23	33	−10	5
19	Romania	7	1	0	6	18	43	−25	2
20	China	7	0	0	7	11	98	−87	0

Switzerland was promoted to Group A while China was relegated to Group C1.

7 April	Latvia	12–0	Romania

7 April	Poland	6–1	Japan

7 April	Switzerland	20–1	China

7 April	Denmark	5–3	Netherlands

8 April	Latvia	22–0	China

8 April	Poland	6–4	Netherlands

8 April	Switzerland	10–3	Japan

9 April	Denmark	4–2	Romania

10 April	Netherlands	8–3	China

10 April	Denmark	2–5	Poland

10 April	Latvia	9–3	Japan

10 April	Switzerland	5–0	Romania

11 April	Switzerland	10–0	Netherlands

12 April	Denmark	12–2	China

12 April	Latvia	7–0	Poland

12 April	Romania	4–7	Japan

13 April	Denmark	1–2	Switzerland

13 April	Poland	10–2	Romania

14 April	Japan	14–2	China

14 April	Netherlands	2–4	Latvia

15 April	Romania	7–1	China

15 April	Denmark	2–6	Latvia

15 April	Switzerland	3–3	Poland

16 April	Netherlands	2–2	Japan

17 April	Poland	15–2	China

17 April	Denmark	5–7	Japan

17 April	Switzerland	2–1	Latvia

17 April	Netherlands	4–3	Romania

== World Championship Group C1 (Slovakia) ==
Played in Poprad and Spišská Nová Ves 18–27 March. The hosts, shortly after losing in the quarterfinals of the Olympics, were expected to have a relatively easy time playing in Group C. However, all three former Soviet republics gave them very tough games, and prevailing by a single goal in the final game sealed their victory. North Korea was supposed to be the eighth team in this tournament, but did not participate.

Pos	Team	Pld	W	D	L	GF	GA	GD	Pts
21	Slovakia	6	4	2	0	43	3	+40	10
22	Belarus	6	5	0	1	35	11	+24	10
23	Ukraine	6	3	2	1	49	7	+42	8
24	Kazakhstan	6	3	2	1	52	12	+40	8
25	Slovenia	6	2	0	4	26	27	−1	4
26	Hungary	6	1	0	5	14	47	−33	2
27	Bulgaria	6	0	0	6	3	115	−112	0

Slovakia was promoted to Group B while absent North Korea was relegated to Group C2

18 March	Slovakia	20–0	Bulgaria

18 March	Belarus	4–2	Ukraine

18 March	Slovenia	8–2	Hungary

19 March	Belarus	13–1	Bulgaria

19 March	Kazakhstan	14–5	Hungary

19 March	Slovakia	9–0	Slovenia

21 March	Belarus	6–3	Slovenia

21 March	Ukraine	8–0	Hungary

21 March	Slovakia	0–0	Kazakhstan

22 March	Belarus	6–3	Kazakhstan

22 March	Hungary	7–2	Bulgaria

22 March	Slovakia	2–2	Ukraine

24 March	Slovenia	13–0	Bulgaria

24 March	Ukraine	0–0	Kazakhstan

24 March	Slovakia	10–0	Hungary

25 March	Kazakhstan	31–0	Bulgaria

25 March	Belarus	5–0	Hungary

25 March	Ukraine	6–1	Slovenia

27 March	Ukraine	31–0	Bulgaria

27 March	Slovakia	2–1	Belarus

27 March	Kazakhstan	4–1	Slovenia

== World Championship Group C2 (Spain) ==
=== Qualifying round ===
Played in November 1993. Two groups played to qualify for the final two spots in Spain.

=== Group 1 (Estonia/Lithuania) ===
Pos	Team	Pld	W	D	L	GF	GA	GD	Pts
1	Estonia	2	2	0	0	16	4	+12	4
2	Lithuania	2	0	0	2	4	16	−12	0

7 November 1993	Estonia	8–3	Lithuania	Tallinn

20 November 1993	Lithuania	1–8	Estonia	Elektrenai

=== Group 2 (Croatia) ===
Played in Zagreb

Pos	Team	Pld	W	D	L	GF	GA	GD	Pts
1	Croatia	2	2	0	0	58	1	+57	4
2	Turkey	2	0	0	2	1	58	−57	0

19 November 1993	Croatia	34–1	Turkey

20 November 1993	Croatia	24–0	Turkey

Croatia and Estonia qualified for Group C2.

=== First round ===
Played in Barcelona

=== Group 1 ===
Pos	Team	Pld	W	D	L	GF	GA	GD	Pts
1	Spain	3	3	0	0	28	5	+23	6
2	Croatia	3	2	0	1	7	11	−4	4
3	Australia	3	1	0	2	8	9	−1	2
4	Israel	3	0	0	3	6	24	−18	0

13 March	Croatia	3–2	Australia

13 March	Spain	17–2	Israel

15 March	Australia	5–4	Israel

15 March	Spain	9–2	Croatia

16 March	Croatia	2–0	Israel

16 March	Spain	2–1	Australia

=== Group 2 ===
Pos	Team	Pld	W	D	L	GF	GA	GD	Pts
1	Estonia	3	3	0	0	49	1	+48	6
2	South Korea	3	2	0	1	9	14	−5	4
3	Belgium	3	1	0	2	15	16	−1	2
4	South Africa	3	0	0	3	4	46	−42	0

13 March	South Africa	2–6	South Korea

13 March	Belgium	0–12	Estonia

15 March	Belgium	13–1	South Africa

15 March	Estonia	10–0	South Korea

16 March	Belgium	2–3	South Korea

16 March	Estonia	27–1	South Africa

=== Final Round 28–31 Place ===
Pos	Team	Pld	W	D	L	GF	GA	GD	Pts
28	Estonia	3	3	0	0	27	0	+27	6
29	Spain	3	1	1	1	11	13	−2	3
30	South Korea	3	1	1	1	4	13	−9	3
31	Croatia	3	0	0	3	3	19	−16	0

Estonia was promoted to Group C1

18 March	Estonia	8–0	Croatia

18 March	Spain	2–2	South Korea

19 March	South Korea	2–1	Croatia

18 March	Spain	0–9	Estonia

=== Consolation round 32–35 place ===
Pos	Team	Pld	W	D	L	GF	GA	GD	Pts
32	Belgium	3	3	0	0	23	6	+17	6
33	Australia	3	2	0	1	17	11	+6	4
34	Israel	3	1	0	2	13	12	+1	2
35	South Africa	3	0	0	3	5	29	−24	0

18 March	Australia	9–2	South Africa

18 March	Belgium	5–2	Israel

19 March	South Africa	2–7	Israel

19 March	Australia	3–5	Belgium

== Ranking and statistics ==
1994 IIHF World Championship winners

Canada
20th title

=== Tournament awards ===
- Best players selected by the directorate:
  - Best Goaltender: (Canada) Bill Ranford
  - Best Defenceman: (Sweden) Magnus Svensson
  - Best Forward: (Canada) Paul Kariya
- Media All-Star Team:
  - Goaltender: (Canada) Bill Ranford
  - Defence: (Finland) Timo Jutila, (Sweden) Magnus Svensson
  - Forwards: (Canada) Paul Kariya, (Finland) Saku Koivu, (Finland) Jari Kurri

=== Final standings ===
The final standings of the tournament according to IIHF:

1st place, gold medalist(s)	Canada
2nd place, silver medalist(s)	Finland
3rd place, bronze medalist(s)	Sweden
4	United States
5	Russia
6	Italy
7	Czech Republic
8	Austria
9	Germany
10	France
11	Norway
12	Great Britain

=== Scoring leaders ===
List shows the top skaters sorted by points, then goals.

Player	GP	G	A	Pts	+/−	PIM	POS
(Sweden) Mats Sundin	8	5	9	14	+13	4	F
(Canada) Paul Kariya	8	5	7	12	+12	2	F
(Finland) Saku Koivu	8	5	6	11	+14	4	F
(Russia) Valeri Kamensky	6	5	5	10	+12	12	F
(Finland) Jari Kurri	8	4	6	10	+11	2	F
(Sweden) Magnus Svensson	8	8	1	9	+9	8	D
(Finland) Mikko Mäkelä	8	5	4	9	+13	6	F
(Russia) Igor Fedulov	6	4	5	9	+11	6	F
(Russia) Andrei Kovalenko	6	3	5	8	+10	2	F
(Finland) Jere Lehtinen	6	3	5	8	+14	4	F
(Sweden) Jonas Bergqvist	8	3	5	8	+8	4	F

=== Leading goaltenders ===
Only the top five goaltenders, based on save percentage, who have played 50% of their team's minutes are included in this list.

Player	MIP	GA	GAA	SVS%	SO
(Russia) Mikhail Shtalenkov	296	5	1.01	.962	2
(Canada) Bill Ranford	370	7	1.14	.956	1
(Finland) Jarmo Myllys	410	9	1.32	.942	2
(Austria) Michael Puschacher	271	9	1.99	.926	0
(United States) Guy Hebert	300	18	3.60	.907	0

== See also ==
- 1994 World Junior Ice Hockey Championships
- 1994 IIHF Women's World Championship
