= Antti Miettinen =

Finnish ice hockey player and coach

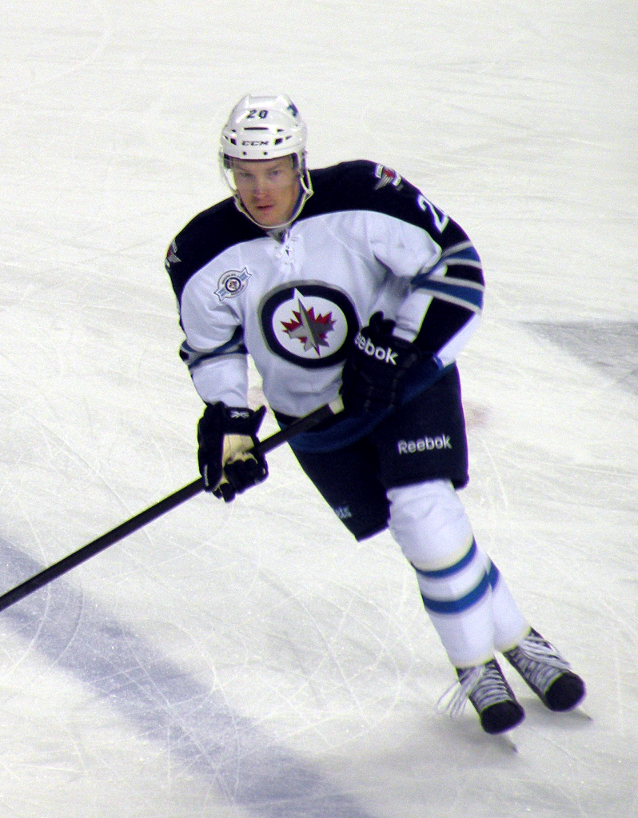
- Born: July 3, 1980 (age 46) Hämeenlinna, Finland
- Height: 6 ft 0 in (183 cm)
- Weight: 190 lb (86 kg; 13 st 8 lb)
- Position: Right wing
- Shot: Right
- Liiga team Former teams: HPK; Dallas Stars; Minnesota Wild; Ak Bars Kazan; Winnipeg Jets; HC Fribourg-Gottéron; Eisbären Berlin
- National team: Finland
- NHL draft: 224th overall, 2000; Dallas Stars
- Playing career: 1999–2016

Medal record

Men's ice hockey

Representing Finland

Olympic Games
Bronze medal – third place	2010 Vancouver	

Antti Markus Miettinen (born July 3, 1980) is a Finnish ice hockey coach and former professional forward, who last played professionally for HPK in Liiga. He had previously played in the National Hockey League (NHL) for the Dallas Stars, Minnesota Wild and Winnipeg Jets. As of 2026, he works for the New York Rangers as a player development assistant in Europe.

== Playing career ==
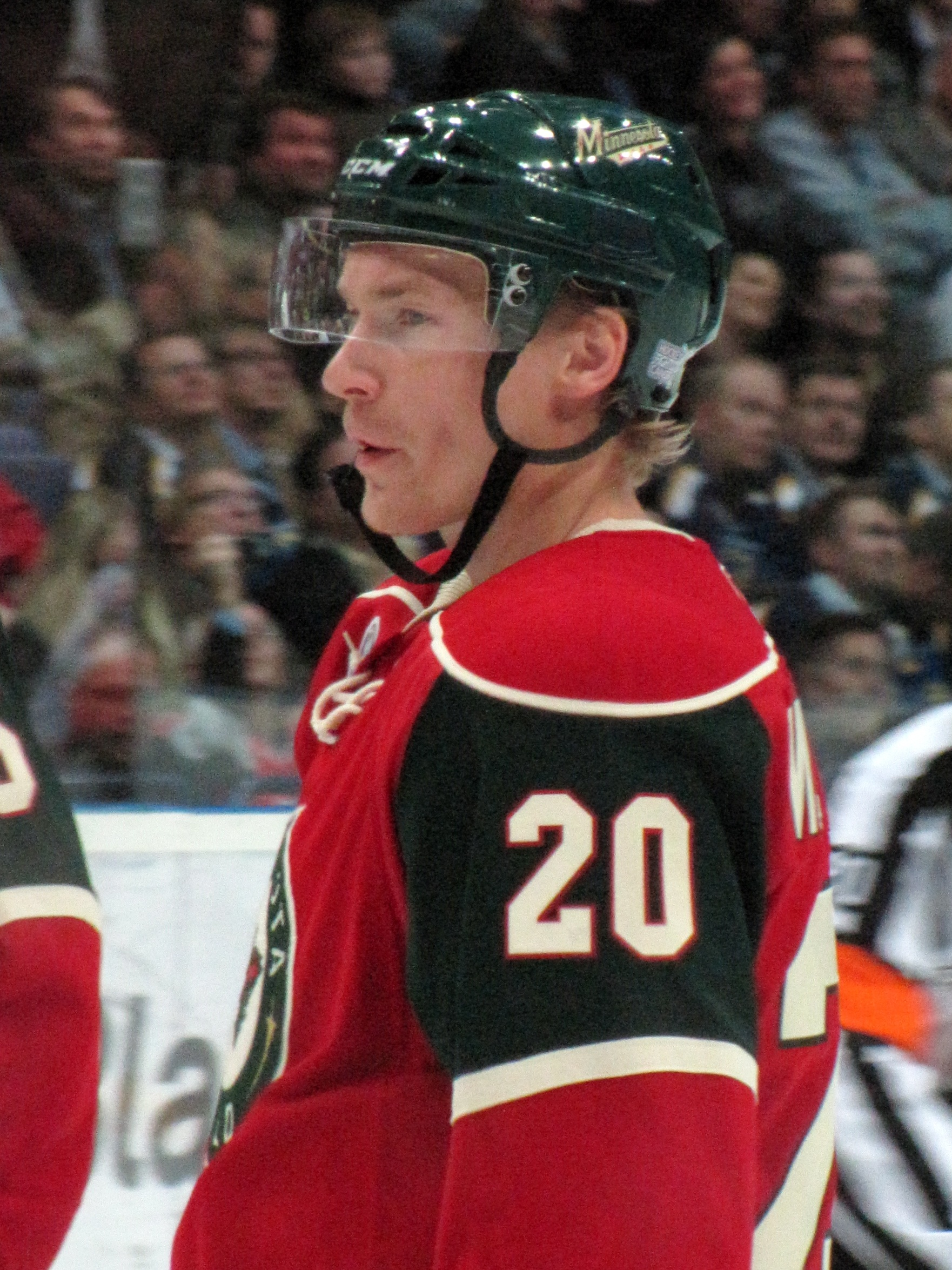
Miettinen with the Wild in 2010

Miettinen was drafted by the Dallas Stars as their seventh-round pick, 224th overall, in the 2000 NHL entry draft. Prior to playing in the NHL, he played for five years in the SM-Liiga with HPK Hämeenlinna, picking up the Kultainen kypärä and the Lasse Oksanen trophy in his final year in Finland.

Miettinen spent two-years in the American Hockey League (AHL) before playing his first full season in the NHL in the 2005–06 season with the Stars. He was chosen to play for Finland in the 2006 Winter Olympics but was unable to participate due to an upper body injury. He was replaced on the team by Stars teammate Niklas Hagman.

On July 3, 2008, Miettinen signed a 3-year $7 million contract with the Minnesota Wild. When the contract ended, he moved to the Kontinental Hockey League (KHL). Four months later on December 12, 2011, Miettinen agreed on a two-year deal to return to the NHL with the Tampa Bay Lightning. However, the following day he was claimed off re-entry waivers by the Winnipeg Jets.

A free agent at the conclusion of his two-year contract with the Jets, Miettinen once again left the NHL and signed a one-year contract with Swiss club HC Fribourg-Gottéron of the National League A on July 22, 2013. In the 2013–14 season, Miettinen was hampered again by injury but posted a credible 7 goals and 22 points in 34 games with Fribourg. After one season in Germany, he returned to HPK for one final season before retiring and becoming an assistant coach with the club.

== Personal life ==
Around 2006, Miettinen started a band called Cement with his friends. He played the guitar and wrote songs for the band. Although not very widely known, they did get one gig—at his wedding.

He and his wife, Johanna, have two children. The older, Noel, was born in 2009.

== Awards ==
- 2002–03 SM-Liiga Kultainen kypärä
- 2002–03 SM-Liiga Lasse Oksanen trophy

== Career statistics ==
=== Regular season and playoffs ===
			Regular season					Playoffs
Season	Team	League	GP	G	A	Pts	PIM	GP	G	A	Pts	PIM
1996–97	HPK	FIN U18	36	24	29	53	23	—	—	—	—	—
1997–98	HPK	FIN U18	34	13	28	41	63	—	—	—	—	—
1997–98	HPK	FIN U20	8	1	0	1	2	—	—	—	—	—
1998–99	HPK	FIN U20	21	5	8	13	20	—	—	—	—	—
1998–99	HPK	SM-l	13	0	0	0	2	4	0	0	0	0
1998–99	FPS	FIN.2	4	3	1	4	6	—	—	—	—	—
1999–2000	HPK	FIN U20	15	11	13	24	16	—	—	—	—	—
1999–2000	HPK	SM-l	39	2	1	3	8	7	1	0	1	0
2000–01	HPK	FIN U20	4	3	10	13	2	—	—	—	—	—
2000–01	HPK	SM-l	55	13	11	24	28	—	—	—	—	—
2001–02	HPK	SM-l	56	19	37	56	50	8	2	4	6	8
2002–03	HPK	SM-l	53	25	25	50	54	10	1	7	8	29
2003–04	Dallas Stars	NHL	16	1	0	1	0	—	—	—	—	—
2003–04	Utah Grizzlies	AHL	48	7	23	30	20	—	—	—	—	—
2004–05	Hamilton Bulldogs	AHL	35	8	20	28	21	4	1	1	2	6
2005–06	Dallas Stars	NHL	79	11	20	31	46	5	0	1	1	8
2006–07	Dallas Stars	NHL	74	11	14	25	38	4	1	1	2	2
2007–08	Dallas Stars	NHL	69	15	19	34	34	15	1	1	2	0
2008–09	Minnesota Wild	NHL	82	15	29	44	32	—	—	—	—	—
2009–10	Minnesota Wild	NHL	79	20	22	42	44	—	—	—	—	—
2010–11	Minnesota Wild	NHL	73	16	19	35	38	—	—	—	—	—
2011–12	Ak Bars Kazan	KHL	20	2	6	8	8	—	—	—	—	—
2011–12	Winnipeg Jets	NHL	45	5	8	13	0	—	—	—	—	—
2012–13	HPK	SM-l	15	4	4	8	10	—	—	—	—	—
2012–13	Winnipeg Jets	NHL	22	3	2	5	2	—	—	—	—	—
2013–14	HC Fribourg–Gottéron	NLA	34	7	15	22	8	—	—	—	—	—
2014–15	Eisbären Berlin	DEL	48	11	18	29	22	3	2	0	2	4
2015–16	HPK	Liiga	34	7	11	18	24	—	—	—	—	—
SM-l/Liiga totals			265	70	89	159	176	29	4	11	15	37
NHL totals			539	97	133	230	234	24	2	3	5	10

=== International ===
Year	Team	Event	GP	G	A	Pts	PIM
2000	Finland	WJC	7	4	1	5	2
2002	Finland	WC	9	2	4	6	4
2003	Finland	WC	6	0	1	1	0
2006	Finland	WC	9	2	2	4	10
2007	Finland	WC	8	1	1	2	6
2009	Finland	WC	7	3	5	8	6
2010	Finland	OG	6	1	0	1	0
2010	Finland	WC	6	0	2	2	4
Senior totals			51	9	15	24	30

Awards and achievements
Preceded by Janne Ojanen	Winner of the Kultainen kypärä trophy 2002–03	Succeeded by Timo Pärssinen
