= Timo Nummelin =

Finnish footballer and ice hockey player (born 1948)

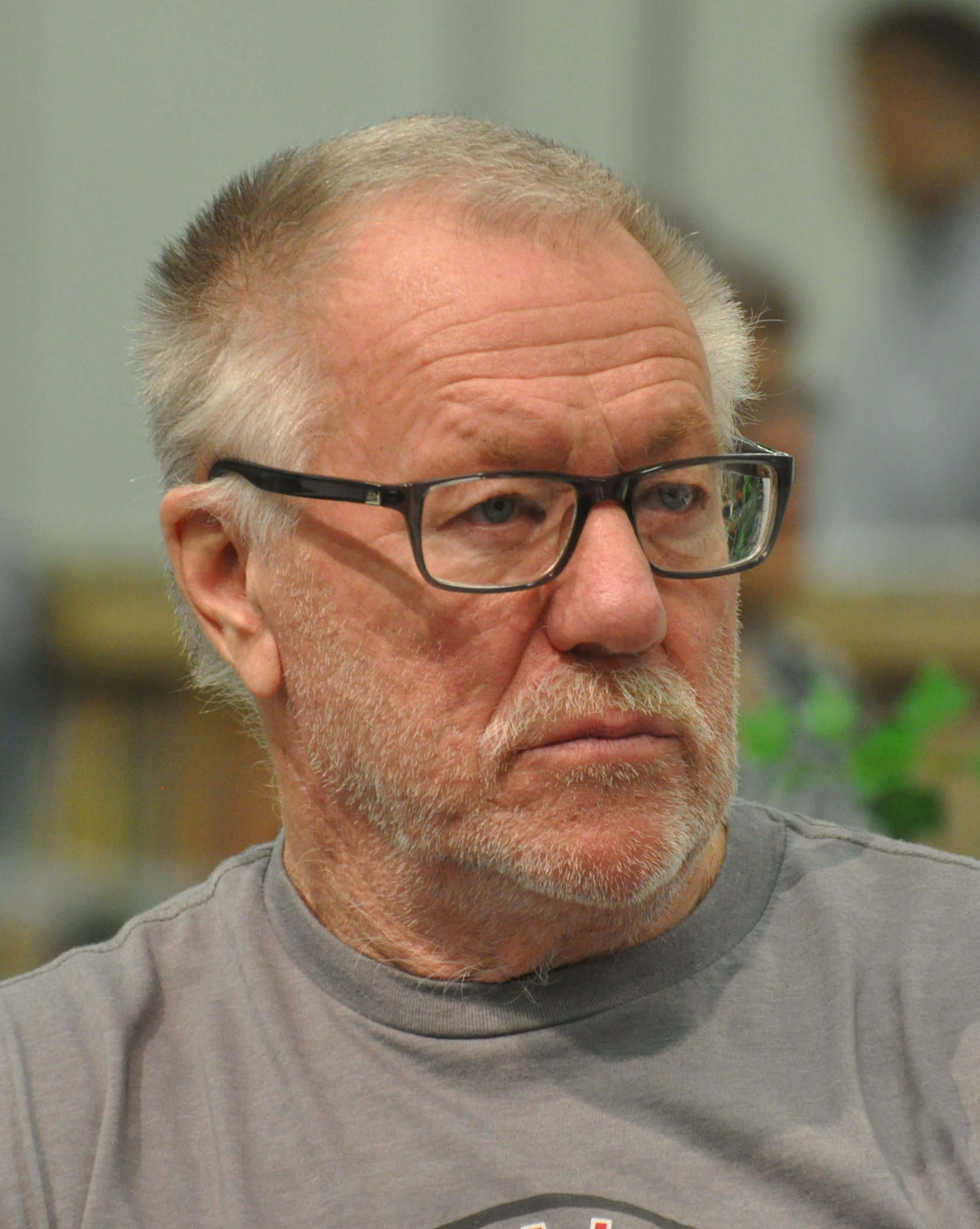
- Nummelin in 2016
- Born: 7 September 1948 (age 77) Turku, Finland
- Height: 5 ft 10 in (178 cm)
- Weight: 190 lb (86 kg; 13 st 8 lb)
- Position: Defence
- Shot: Left
- Played for: TPS
- National team: Finland
- Playing career: 1964–1987

Timo Kalevi Nummelin (born 7 September 1948) is a Finnish former professional football and ice hockey player who played in SM-liiga (ice hockey) and the predecessor of Veikkausliiga (football).

He played for TPS both in ice hockey and in football, and also has won the Finnish Championship in both sports (ice hockey 1976, football 1968, 1971 and 1972). He is the only Finnish sportsman to be named player of the year both in football (1968) and ice hockey (1981). He has also played in the Finland national team both in ice hockey (225 games, 18+22=40) and football (14 appearances), and appeared in eight Ice Hockey World Championships.

Nummelin is considered to be the biggest icon of the TPS hockey organization. His number 3 jersey has been retired and can only be used by his son Petteri Nummelin. Nummelin is also known for his goal celebration, in which he imitates playing a violin with his stick. This is mentioned in TPS's goal song "Hunajata" with the words "soi viulu" (the violin plays) in the chorus.

Nummelin was inducted into the Finnish Hockey Hall of Fame in 1991. In 2013–14, Nummelin played one match for Haka Hockey in the third league in Finland, becoming the oldest player, at age 65, to appear in an official ice hockey game played in Finland.

Nummelin is the father of the Finnish ice hockey player Petteri Nummelin and the father-in-law of the Finnish ice hockey player Antti Niemi.
