= HC TPS =

Finnish ice hockey team in the Liiga

TPS
- Nickname: Tepsi
- City: Turku
- League: Liiga
- Founded: 1922
- Home arena: Gatorade Center (capacity: 10,500)
- Colours: Black, white
- Owners: TPS Turku ry (37%); VMP Oy; Miikka Kiprusoff; TS-Yhtymä; Mikko and Saku Koivu
- CEO: Aki Holma
- Head coach: Toni Söderholm
- Captain: Tarmo Reunanen
- Website: hc.tps.fi
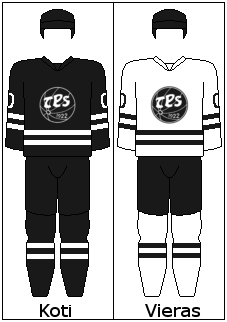

Franchise history
- 1922–present: TPS

Championships
- Playoff championships: 1956, 1976, 1989, 1990, 1991, 1993, 1995, 1999, 2000, 2001, 2010

TPS or Turun Palloseura is an ice hockey team and 10-time champion of SM-liiga and 1-time champion of SM-sarja. They play in Turku, Finland, at Gatorade Center. In terms of championships, TPS is the second all-time most successful team in SM-Liiga, right behind Tappara.

== Team history ==
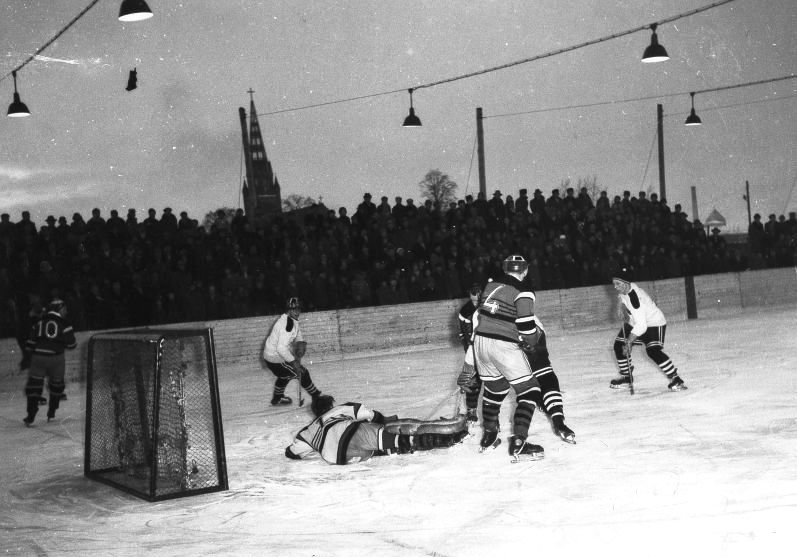
HC TPS (white jerseys) playing against Porin Kärpät sometime in the 1950s or 1960s

TPS was established in 1922 as Turun Palloseura, from which the acronym derives. The club began ice hockey activities after 1929. Today, the full name of the company that owns the ice hockey team is HC TPS Turku Oy.

TPS has won the Finnish Championship in ice hockey 11 times: 1956, 1976, 1989, 1990, 1991, 1993, 1995, 1999, 2000, 2001, and 2010. Only Tampere teams Ilves and Tappara have won more titles when SM-sarja also counts. Coach Hannu Jortikka led the club to a total of six championships in 1989–91 and 1999–2001. TPS have also won two Finnish Cups, a European Cup in 1994, the European Hockey League in 1997, and a Super Cup in 1997.

Vladimir Yurzinov used to be the coach of TPS in 1992–98. The team is currently coached by Tommi Miettinen.

NHL players from TPS include Saku Koivu, Mikko Koivu, Miikka Kiprusoff, Sami Salo, Petteri Nummelin, Niko Kapanen, Jere Lehtinen, Rasmus Ristolainen, Antero Niittymäki, Lauri Korpikoski, Mikko Rantanen, Artturi Lehkonen, Matias Maccelli, Juraj Slafkovský, Kaapo Kakko, Juuso Pärssinen and others.

== Honours ==
=== Finnish Champions ===
- (gold) SM-liiga, Kanada-malja (10): 1976, 1989, 1990, 1991, 1993, 1995, 1999, 2000, 2001, 2010
- (gold) SM-sarja (1): 1956

=== Runners-up ===
- (silver) SM-liiga (8): 1977, 1982, 1985, 1994, 1996, 1997, 2004, 2021, 2022
- (silver) SM-sarja (4): 1943, 1955, 1957, 1967
- (bronze) SM-liiga (3): 1978, 1979, 1981
- (bronze) SM-sarja (1): 1953

=== Finnish cup ===
- (gold) Finnish Cup (ice hockey) (2): 1955, 1956

=== European Cup ===
- (gold) IIHF European Cup (1): 1993
- (gold) European Hockey League (1): 1997

== Players ==
=== Current roster ===
Updated 23 September 2024

No.	Nat	Player	Pos	S/G	Age	Acquired	Birthplace
44	(Sweden)	Niklas Arell (A)	D	L	35	2021	Ekerö, Sweden
64	(Canada)	Jean-Christophe Beaudin	C	R	29	2024	Longueuil, Quebec, Canada
27	(Canada)	Aidan Dudas	LW	R	26	2023	Parry Sound, Ontario, Canada
77	(Finland)	Topias Haapanen	LW	L	28	2020	Pirkkala, Finland
41	(Finland)	Aarne Intonen	C	L	25	2019	Lieto, Finland
4	(Finland)	Mitja Jokinen	D	L	20	2024	Raisio, Finland
61	(Finland)	Casimir Jürgens (C)	D	L	31	2023	Helsinki, Finland
78	(Finland)	Robin Keihäs	RW	L	22	2024	Raisio, Finland
9	(Finland)	Aatos Koivu	C	R	20	2023	Turku, Finland
7	(Denmark)	Oliver Lauridsen (A)	D	L	37	2023	Gentofte, Denmark
40	(Finland)	Sisu-Petteri Lehtonen	D	L	26	2022	Turku, Finland
55	(Sweden)	Max Lindroth	D	L	30	2023	Sävedalen, Sweden
20	(Finland)	Viljami Marjala	LW	L	23	2022	Oulu, Finland
57	(Finland)	Vili Munkki	LW	L	24	2022	Naantali, Finland
29	(Finland)	Markus Nenonen	LW	L	33	2024	Jämsänkoski, Finland
1	(Finland)	Juho Nupponen	G	L	22	2024	Rauma, Finland
81	(Finland)	Markus Oden	F	R	25	2024	Pierce County, Washington, United States
52	(Finland)	Petrus Palmu (A)	RW	L	29	2023	Joensuu, Finland
82	(Finland)	Eetu Päkkilä	LW	L	27	2024	Oulu, Finland
33	(Finland)	Otto Salin	D	R	22	2023	Helsinki, Finland
48	(Canada)	Carter Savoie	LW	L	24	2024	St. Albert, Alberta, Canada
57	(Finland)	Roni Sevänen	D	L	31	2023	Eura, Finland
17	(Finland)	Aarne Talvitie (A)	C	L	27	2023	Espoo, Finland
98	(Finland)	Leevi Teissala	RW	R	25	2023	Turku, Finland
32	(Finland)	Noa Vali	G	L	21	2023	Forssa, Finland
49	(Sweden)	Lukas Wernblom	C	L	26	2023	Örnsköldsvik, Sweden
30	(Sweden)	Adam Werner	G	L	29	2024	Mariestad, Sweden

=== Staff ===
- Head Coach: Toni Solderholm (Finland)
- Assistant Coach: Kari Kalto (Finland)
- Assistant Coach: Sami Salo (Finland)
- Goaltending Coach: Ari Moisanen (Finland)
- Physical Coach: Risto Rosendahl (Finland)
- Video Coach: Vesa Petäjä (Finland)
- Sporting Director: Rauli Urama (Finland)

=== Honored numbers ===
- 3—Timo Nummelin
- 8—Juhani Wahlsten
- 11—Saku Koivu
- 12—Jukka Vikander
- 15—Reijo Leppänen
- 16—Rauli Tammelin
- 23—Hannu Virta

=== Notable alumni ===
- Antti Aalto
- Peter Ahola
- Mika Alatalo
- Marko Anttila
- Jim Bedard
- Aki-Petteri Berg
- Mal Davis
- Miika Elomo
- Mikko Eloranta
- Atte Engren
- Vjačeslavs Fanduļs
- Ilari Filppula
- Alexandar Georgiev
- Steve Graves
- Tuomas Grönman
- Mikko Haapakoski
- Michael Holmqvist
- Ivan Huml
- Jani Hurme
- Hannes Hyvönen
- Kari Jalonen
- Marko Jantunen
- Martti Jarkko
- Martti Järventie
- Joonas Järvinen
- Arto Javanainen
- Chris Joseph
- Olli Juolevi
- Tomi Kallio
- Niko Kapanen
- Esa Keskinen
- Markus Ketterer
- Marko Kiprusoff
- Miikka Kiprusoff
- Tom Koivisto
- Mikko Koivu
- Saku Koivu
- Lauri Korpikoski
- Teemu Laine
- Jere Lehtinen
- Mika Lehtinen
- Petteri Lehto
- Antero Lehtonen
- Reijo Leppänen
- Seppo Lindström
- Joni Lius
- Jouni Loponen
- Mikko Mäkelä
- Kent McDonell
- Tommi Miettinen
- Reijo Mikkolainen
- Tomáš Mojžíš
- Antero Niittymäki
- Petteri Nummelin
- Timo Nummelin
- Kai Nurminen
- Lasse Pirjetä
- Tomáš Plíhal
- Jukka Porvari
- Mikko Rantanen
- Seppo Repo
- Kimmo Rintanen
- Craig Rivet
- Alexander Salák
- Peter Schaefer
- Rob Shearer
- Andrei Skopintsev
- Karlis Skrastins
- Juraj Slafkovsky
- Aleksandr Smirnov
- Raimo Summanen
- Sami Salo
- Kai Suikkanen
- Niklas Sundblad
- Seppo Suoraniemi
- Toivo Suursoo
- Oldřich Svoboda
- Lee Sweatt
- Henrik Tallinder
- Juhani Tamminen
- Jussi Timonen
- Kimmo Timonen
- German Titov
- Pavel Torgayev
- Viktor Tyumenev
- Ville Vahalahti
- Jorma Valtonen
- Jarkko Varvio
- Jukka Vilander
- Hannu Virta
- Tony Virta
- Jukka Virtanen
- Jiří Vykoukal
- Juhani Wahlsten
- Urpo Ylönen
- Richard Žemlička

== Seasonal history ==
Season by Season records
Season	GP	W	L	D	OTW	P	GF	GA	Coach	Final position
1940–41	7	0	7	0	0	0	5	23		8th
1941–42 No season completed due to war										
1942–43	7	5	1	1	0	11	23	9		2nd
1943–44	7	5	1	1	0	11	29	8		No season completed due to war
1944–45	8	5	2	1	0	11	27	17		4th
1945–46	8	3	4	1	0	7	30	48		6th
1946–47	8	3	5	0	0	6	42	76		6th
1947–48	6	0	6	0	0	0	12	74		7th
1948–49 Didn't compete on the top level										
1949–50 Didn't compete on the top level										
1950–51 Didn't compete on the top level										
1951–52 Didn't compete on the top level										
1952–53	10	7	3	0	0	14	53	38		Bronze
1953–54	8	5	2	1	0	11	38	29		4th
1954–55	8	6	1	1	0	13	45	17	Esko Pekkalainen	Silver
1955–56	8	6	2	0	0	12	31	28	Pentti Lumikko	Gold
1956–57	8	6	2	0	0	12	40	22	Esko Pekkalainen	Silver
1957–58	8	3	3	2	0	8	43	39	Esko Pekkalainen	4th
1958–59	18	9	8	1	0	19	67	53	Esko Pekkalainen	5th
1959–60	18	8	7	3	0	19	68	81	Esko Pekkalainen	6th
1960–61	18	8	5	5	0	21	73	58		4th
1961–62	18	5	12	1	0	11	52	65		9th
1962–63 Didn't compete on the top level									Norwel Olsen	
1963–64	18	7	10	1	0	15	80	60	Norwel Olsen	8th
1964–65	18	9	7	2	0	20	51	63	Pertti Nieminen	4th
1965–66	20	10	7	3	0	23	66	58	Pertti Nieminen	4th
1966–67	22	15	6	1	0	31	91	56	Pertti Nieminen	Silver
1967–68	20	5	13	2	0	12	64	82		10th
1968–69 Didn't compete on the top level									Rauli Virtanen	
1969–70	22	13	5	4	0	30	107	67		4th
1970–71	22	6	14	2	0	14	71	101		9th
1971–72	32	17	13	2	0	36	141	104	Juhani Wahlsten	7th
1972–73	36	9	22	5	0	23	126	182	Matias Helenius	9th
1973–74	36	10	20	6	0	26	133	179	Matias Helenius	8th
1974–75	36	15	17	4	0	34	153	156	Reima Särös	5th
1975–76	36	25	6	5	0	55	194	113	Raimo Määttänen	Gold
1976–77	36	23	10	3	0	49	187	129	Raimo Määttänen	Silver
1977–78	36	22	11	3	0	47	180	123	Raimo Määttänen	Bronze
1978–79	36	18	14	4	0	40	144	123	Raimo Määttänen	Bronze
1979–80	36	26	6	4	0	56	210	123	Raimo Määttänen	4th
1980–81	36	22	9	5	0	49	213	141	Juhani Wahlsten	Bronze
1981–82	36	23	7	6	0	52	180	120	Juhani Wahlsten	Silver
1982–83	36	18	13	5	0	41	145	131	Juhani Wahlsten	5th
1983–84	37	23	13	1	0	47	150	117	Matti Keinonen	4th
1984–85	36	24	10	2	0	50	163	124	Matti Keinonen	Silver
1985–86	36	18	13	5	0	41	153	139	Juhani Tamminen	4th
1986–87	44	22	16	6	0	50	198	194	Juhani Tamminen	4th
1987–88	44	22	19	3	0	47	206	182	Juhani Tamminen	5th
1988–89	44	29	10	5	0	63	209	120	Hannu Jortikka	Gold
1989–90	44	31	10	3	0	65	175	100	Hannu Jortikka	Gold
1990–91	44	27	12	5	0	59	168	109	Hannu Jortikka	Gold
1991–92	44	29	14	1	0	59	181	153	Hannu Jortikka	5th
1992–93	48	28	12	8	0	64	178	138	Vladimir Yurzinov	Gold
1993–94	48	34	14	0	0	68	227	124	Vladimir Yurzinov	Silver
1994–95	50	30	17	3	0	63	219	149	Vladimir Yurzinov	Gold
1995–96	50	33	12	5	0	71	216	141	Vladimir Yurzinov	Silver
1996–97	50	32	11	7	0	71	191	105	Vladimir Yurzinov	Silver
1997–98	48	30	12	6	0	66	162	111	Vladimir Yurzinov	5th
1998–99	54	37	10	7	0	81	179	107	Hannu Jortikka	Gold
1999–00	54	39	10	5	0	83	232	118	Hannu Jortikka	Gold
2000–01	56	36	16	4	0	76	186	115	Hannu Jortikka	Gold
2001–02	56	32	21	3	0	69	154	111	Kari Jalonen	4th
2002–03	56	24	26	6	0	56	138	138	Kari Jalonen	8th
2003–04	56	35	14	7	0	80	169	112	Jukka Koivu	Silver
2004–05	56	22	16	18	8	92	146	142	Jukka Koivu	6th
2005–06	56	14	23	19	11	72	119	135	Hannu Jortikka	10th
2006–07	56	23	22	11	6	86	167	155	Hannu Jortikka	9th
2007–08	56	18	27	11	2	67	130	164	Hannu Virta	10th
2008–09	58	21	27	10	7	80	133	159	Hannu Virta until Oct 2008, after that Kai Suikkanen	8th
2009–10	58	25	25	8	6	89	169	169	Kai Suikkanen	Gold
2010–11	60	12	32	16	8	60	134	186	Heikki Leime until Oct 2010, then Riku-Petteri Lehtonen until Jan 2011, after that Jukka Koivu	13th
2011–12	60	21	30	9	6	78	134	180	Pekka Virta	10th
2012–13	60	12	28	20	8	64	144	181	Pekka Virta until Oct 2012, after that Juha Pajuoja	13th
2013–14	60	12	31	17	6	59	135	197	Kai Suikkanen	13th
2014–15	60	17	32	11	3	65	122	172	Kai Suikkanen until Nov 2014, then Miika Elomo until Feb 2015, after that Jarno Pikkarainen	13th
2015–16	60	23	22	15	6	90	150	152	Ari-Pekka Selin	7th
2016–17	60	30	14	16	8	114	167	123	Ari-Pekka Selin	5th
2017–18	60	30	15	15	7	112	187	147	Kalle Kaskinen	4th
2018–19	60	29	20	11	5	103	164	152	Kalle Kaskinen	6th
2019–20	59	17	29	13	5	69	149	185	Kalle Kaskinen until Oct 2019, after that Marko Virtanen	11th
2020–21	59	27	14	18	7	106	165	140	Raimo Helminen	Silver
GP=Games Played, W=Won, L=Lost, D=Draw, OTW=Wins after overtime/penalties, P=Points, GF=Goals for, GA=Goals against

== Liiga individual awards ==
=== Best coach ===
- 2010 Kai Suikkanen
- 2001 Hannu Jortikka
- 2000 Hannu Jortikka
- 1999 Hannu Jortikka
- 1995 Vladimir Yurzinov
- 1994 Vladimir Yurzinov
- 1993 Vladimir Yurzinov
- 1991 Hannu Jortikka
- 1990 Hannu Jortikka
- 1989 Hannu Jortikka

=== SM-liiga Best player of the season, MVP ===
As voted by the players.

- 2001 Kimmo Rintanen
- 2000 Kai Nurminen
- 1997 Kimmo Rintanen
- 1995 Saku Koivu
- 1994 Esa Keskinen
- 1992 Mikko Mäkelä
- 1989 Jukka Vilander

=== Best goalie ===
- 2010 Atte Engren
- 1999 Miikka Kiprusoff
- 1997 Jani Hurme
- 1991 Markus Ketterer
- 1989 Timo Lehkonen
- 1980 Jorma Valtonen
- 1979 Jorma Valtonen

=== Best defenceman ===
- 2010 Lee Sweatt
- 2001 Jouni Loponen
- 1995 Petteri Nummelin
- 1994 Petteri Nummelin
- 1991 Hannu Virta
- 1990 Hannu Virta
- 1987 Hannu Virta

=== League top goalscorer ===
- 2000 Kai Nurminen
- 1994 Marko Jantunen
- 1989 Jukka Vilander
- 1988 Arto Javanainen
- 1982 Reijo Leppänen

=== Most points in regular season ===
- 2000 Kai Nurminen
- 1995 Saku Koivu
- 1994 Esa Keskinen
- 1993 Esa Keskinen
- 1992 Mikko Mäkelä
- 1988 Esa Keskinen
- 1982 Reijo Leppänen
- 1981 Reijo Leppänen

=== Rookie of the Season ===
- 2019 Kaapo Kakko
- 2018 Petrus Palmu
- 2007 Tuomas Suominen
- 2000 Antero Niittymäki
- 1996 Jani Hurme
- 1982 Hannu Virta

=== Best plus/minus ===
- 2017 Jasper Lindsten
- 2001 Jouni Loponen
- 2000 Kai Nurminen
- 1997 Kimmo Timonen
- 1994 Aleksandr Smirnov
- 1990 Jukka Virtanen
- 1989 Jukka Vilander
- 1982 Timo Nummelin
- 1980 Reijo Leppänen

=== Regular season MVP ===
Awarded by the league.

- 2001 Tony Virta
- 2000 Kai Nurminen
- 1997 Jani Hurme
- 1995 Saku Koivu
- 1994 Esa Keskinen

=== Gentleman player ===
- 2012 Ville Vahalahti
- 2001 Kimmo Rintanen
- 2000 Kimmo Rintanen
- 1999 Marko Kiprusoff
- 1998 Kimmo Rintanen
- 1997 Kimmo Rintanen
- 1995 Jere Lehtinen
- 1993 Esa Keskinen
- 1989 Jukka Vilander
- 1988 Jukka Vilander
- 1987 Jukka Vilander
- 1985 Reijo Leppänen
- 1984 Esa Keskinen
- 1981 Timo Nummelin
- 1977 Jarmo Koivunen
- 1957 Aki Salonen

=== Playoffs MVP ===
- 2010 Ilari Filppula
- 2000 Tomi Kallio
- 1999 Miikka Kiprusoff
- 1995 Saku Koivu

== Former coaches ==
- Vladimir Yurzinov
- Jukka Koivu
- Hannu Jortikka
- Hannu Virta
- Pekka Virta
- Juha Pajuoja
- Heikki Leime
- Riku-Petteri Lehtonen
- Juhani Tamminen
- Kari Jalonen
- Matti Keinonen
- Juhani Wahlsten

== See also ==
- Category:HC TPS players
