= 1996–97 European Hockey League =

1997 edition of the European Hockey League

The 1996–97 European Hockey League was the first edition of the new tournament for European hockey clubs, the European Hockey League. The season started in September 1996, and finished on January 26, 1997.

The tournament was won by TPS, who beat HC Dynamo Moscow in the final.

== First round ==
=== Group A ===
Team #1	Score	Team #2
Manchester Storm (United Kingdom)	0–6	(Finland) TPS
Berlin Capitals (Germany)	1–5	(Sweden) Luleå HF
TPS (Finland)	4–2	(Germany) Berlin Capitals
Luleå HF (Sweden)	10–6	(United Kingdom) Manchester Storm
Manchester Storm (United Kingdom)	2–4	(Germany) Berlin Capitals
TPS (Finland)	3–3	(Sweden) Luleå HF
Berlin Capitals (Germany)	6–1	(United Kingdom) Manchester Storm
Luleå HF (Sweden)	0–3	(Finland) TPS
Manchester Storm (United Kingdom)	0–11	(Sweden) Luleå HF
Berlin Capitals (Germany)	0–2	(Finland) TPS
Luleå HF (Sweden)	1–3	(Germany) Berlin Capitals
TPS (Finland)	2–1	(United Kingdom) Manchester Storm

=== Group A standings ===
Rank	Team	Points
1	(Finland) TPS	11
2	(Sweden) Luleå HF	7
3	(Germany) Berlin Capitals	6
4	(United Kingdom) Manchester Storm	0

=== Group B ===
Team #1	Score	Team #2
HC Dynamo Moscow (Russia)	5–0	(Sweden) Färjestad BK
Vålerenga (Norway)	2–1	(Czech Republic) HC České Budějovice
HC České Budějovice (Czech Republic)	1–1	(Russia) HC Dynamo Moscow
Färjestad BK (Sweden)	7–2	(Norway) Vålerenga
Vålerenga (Norway)	1–8	(Russia) HC Dynamo Moscow
HC České Budějovice (Czech Republic)	3–3	(Sweden) Färjestad BK
HC Dynamo Moscow (Russia)	3–2	(Norway) Vålerenga
Färjestad BK (Sweden)	3–5	(Czech Republic) HC České Budějovice
Vålerenga (Norway)	1–4	(Sweden) Färjestad BK
HC Dynamo Moscow (Russia)	2–6	(Czech Republic) HC České Budějovice
HC České Budějovice (Czech Republic)	2–1	(Norway) Vålerenga
Färjestad BK (Sweden)	1–2	(Russia) HC Dynamo Moscow

=== Group B standings ===
Rank	Team	Points
1	(Russia) HC Dynamo Moscow	9
2	(Czech Republic) HC České Budějovice	8
3	(Sweden) Färjestad BK	5
4	(Norway) Vålerenga	2

=== Group C ===
Team #1	Score	Team #2
HC Sparta Praha (Czech Republic)	9–1	(Austria) CE Wien
HC Slovan Bratislava (Slovakia)	7–3	(Russia) HC CSKA Moscow
HC CSKA Moscow (Russia)	4–1	(Czech Republic) HC Sparta Praha
CE Wien (Austria)	0–9	(Slovakia) HC Slovan Bratislava
HC CSKA Moscow (Russia)	5–2	(Austria) CE Wien
HC Slovan Bratislava (Slovakia)	1–5	(Czech Republic) HC Sparta Praha
HC Sparta Praha (Czech Republic)	5–3	(Slovakia) HC Slovan Bratislava
CE Wien (Austria)	1–5	(Russia) HC CSKA Moscow
HC Sparta Praha (Czech Republic)	4–2	(Russia) HC CSKA Moscow
HC Slovan Bratislava (Slovakia)	6–5	(Austria) CE Wien
HC CSKA Moscow (Russia)	1–2	(Slovakia) HC Slovan Bratislava
CE Wien (Austria)	3–4	(Czech Republic) HC Sparta Praha

=== Group C standings ===
Rank	Team	Points
1	(Czech Republic) HC Sparta Praha	10
2	(Slovakia) HC Slovan Bratislava	8
3	(Russia) HC CSKA Moscow	6
4	(Austria) CE Wien	0

=== Group D ===
Team #1	Score	Team #2
HC Milano 24 (Italy)	1–6	(Germany) Kölner Haie
Jokerit (Finland)	3–1	(Switzerland) SC Bern
Kölner Haie (Germany)	0–1	(Finland) Jokerit
SC Bern (Switzerland)	8–4	(Italy) HC Milano 24
HC Milano 24 (Italy)	0–11	(Finland) Jokerit
Kölner Haie (Germany)	2–2	(Switzerland) SC Bern
Jokerit (Finland)	7–4	(Italy) HC Milano 24
SC Bern (Switzerland)	3–3	(Germany) Kölner Haie
Jokerit (Finland)	3–2	(Germany) Kölner Haie
HC Milano 24 (Italy)	3–4	(Switzerland) SC Bern
Kölner Haie (Germany)	3–0	(Italy) HC Milano 24
SC Bern (Switzerland)	2–3	(Finland) Jokerit

=== Group D standings ===
Rank	Team	Points
1	(Finland) Jokerit	12
2	(Germany) Kölner Haie	6
3	(Switzerland) SC Bern	6
4	(Italy) HC Milano 24	0

=== Group E ===
Team #1	Score	Team #2
Västra Frölunda HC (Sweden)	1–2	(Finland) Lukko
Rouen HC (France)	3–3	(Czech Republic) HC Litvínov
Lukko (Finland)	4–2	(France) Rouen HC
HC Litvínov (Czech Republic)	1–1	(Sweden) Västra Frölunda HC
Lukko (Finland)	3–5	(Czech Republic) HC Litvínov
Västra Frölunda HC (Sweden)	8–0	(France) Rouen HC
HC Litvínov (Czech Republic)	9–4	(Finland) Lukko
Rouen HC (France)	2–3	(Sweden) Västra Frölunda HC
Rouen HC (France)	7–7	(Finland) Lukko
Västra Frölunda HC (Sweden)	6–2	(Czech Republic) HC Litvínov
Lukko (Finland)	3–4	(Sweden) Västra Frölunda HC
HC Litvínov (Czech Republic)	4–2	(France) Rouen HC

=== Group E standings ===
Rank	Team	Points
1	(Sweden) Västra Frölunda HC	9
2	(Czech Republic) HC Litvínov	8
3	(Finland) Lukko	5
4	(France) Rouen HC	2

== Quarterfinals ==
Team #1	Score	Team #2
HC České Budějovice (Czech Republic)	2–2	(Czech Republic) HC Sparta Praha
HC Litvínov (Czech Republic)	0–2	(Finland) TPS
Västra Frölunda HC (Sweden)	1–1	(Finland) Jokerit
HC Slovan Bratislava (Slovakia)	1–5	(Russia) HC Dynamo Moscow
HC Sparta Praha (Czech Republic)	9–3	(Czech Republic) HC České Budějovice
TPS (Finland)	4–2	(Czech Republic) HC Litvínov
Jokerit (Finland)	1–2	(Sweden) Västra Frölunda HC
HC Dynamo Moscow (Russia)	3–1	(Slovakia) HC Slovan Bratislava

== Final stage ==
(Turku, Finland)

=== Semifinals ===
Team #1	Score	Team #2
TPS (Finland)	5–3	(Czech Republic) HC Sparta Praha
HC Dynamo Moscow (Russia)	3–2	(Sweden) Västra Frölunda HC

=== Third place match ===
Team #1	Score	Team #2
Västra Frölunda HC (Sweden)	4–3	(Czech Republic) HC Sparta Praha

=== Final ===
Team #1	Score	Team #2
TPS (Finland)	5–2	(Russia) HC Dynamo Moscow
