= Mikko Mäkelä (ice hockey) =

Finnish ice hockey player

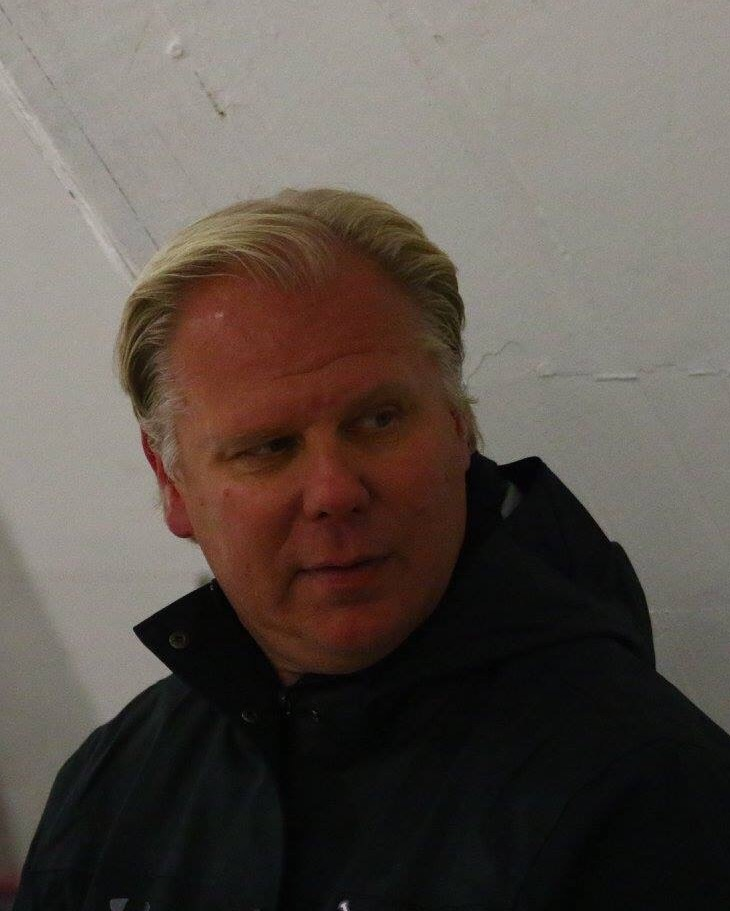
- Born: February 28, 1965 (age 61) Tampere, Finland
- Height: 6 ft 2 in (188 cm)
- Weight: 200 lb (91 kg; 14 st 4 lb)
- Position: Left wing
- Shot: Left
- Played for: New York Islanders; Los Angeles Kings; Buffalo Sabres; Boston Bruins
- National team: Finland
- NHL draft: 65th overall, 1983; New York Islanders
- Playing career: 1984–1999

Mikko Matti Mäkelä (born February 28, 1965) is a Finnish former professional ice hockey left wing. Known as the "Flying Finn", he was drafted in the fourth round, 65th overall, by the New York Islanders in the 1983 NHL entry draft.

Mäkelä made his NHL debut with the Islanders in the 1985–86 season. In four-plus seasons with the Islanders, Mäkelä scored 95 goals, including 37 in the 1987–88 season. The Islanders traded Mäkelä to the Los Angeles Kings during the 1989–90 season in exchange for Hubie McDonough and Ken Baumgartner.

After finishing the 1989–90 season with Los Angeles, Mäkelä was traded again before the 1990–91 season. This time, he went to the Buffalo Sabres in exchange for Mike Donnelly. After one season in Buffalo, Mäkelä returned to Europe, spending two-plus seasons playing in his native Finland and one in Sweden.

Mäkelä returned to the NHL following the 1994–95 NHL lockout, appearing in 11 games with the Boston Bruins during the shortened 1994–95 season. Mäkelä returned to Europe for the remainder of his career, playing two seasons in Germany's Deutsche Eishockey Liga before returning to Sweden and Finland for his final two seasons.

Mäkelä appeared in 423 NHL games in his career, scoring 118 goals and adding 147 assists. He also appeared in 18 Stanley Cup playoff games, scoring three goals and recording eight assists.

Since retiring from professional hockey, Mäkelä has moved to Lethbridge, Alberta, where he and his family currently reside.

Mäkelä served as the head coach for the Lethbridge Hurricanes of the Western Hockey League. With the hiring, Mäkelä was the first European born and bred head coach in the history of the Canadian Hockey League. Mäkelä would be relieved of his duties on January 13, 2004 and replaced by former London Knights head coach Lindsay Hofford.

He worked at the Warner Hockey School, a private girls' school located in Warner, Alberta where he served as both Head Coach and Director of Hockey Operations of the Warner Hockey School Warriors girls' hockey team of the Junior Women's Hockey League.

== Career statistics ==
=== Regular season and playoffs ===
			Regular season					Playoffs
Season	Team	League	GP	G	A	Pts	PIM	GP	G	A	Pts	PIM
1982–83	Ilves	FIN U20	23	29	11	40	28	4	2	5	7	2
1983–84	Ilves	FIN U20	1	0	0	0	0	—	—	—	—	—
1983–84	Ilves	SM-l	35	17	11	28	26	2	0	1	1	0
1984–85	Ilves	SM-l	36	34	25	59	24	9	4	7	11	10
1985–86	New York Islanders	NHL	58	16	20	36	28	—	—	—	—	—
1985–86	Springfield Indians	AHL	2	1	1	2	0	—	—	—	—	—
1986–87	New York Islanders	NHL	80	24	33	57	24	11	2	4	6	8
1987–88	New York Islanders	NHL	73	36	40	76	22	6	1	4	5	6
1988–89	New York Islanders	NHL	76	17	28	45	22	—	—	—	—	—
1989–90	Los Angeles Kings	NHL	45	7	14	21	16	1	0	0	0	0
1990–91	Buffalo Sabres	NHL	60	15	7	22	25	—	—	—	—	—
1991–92	TPS	SM-l	44	25	45	70	38	3	2	3	5	0
1992–93	TPS	SM-l	38	17	27	44	22	11	4	8	12	0
1993–94	Malmö IF	SEL	37	15	21	36	20	11	4	7	11	2
1994–95	Ilves	SM-l	18	3	11	14	4	—	—	—	—	—
1994–95	Boston Bruins	NHL	11	1	2	3	0	—	—	—	—	—
1994–95	Providence Bruins	AHL	—	—	—	—	—	7	2	4	6	2
1995–96	Düsseldorfer EG	DEL	47	17	37	54	16	13	0	14	14	12
1996–97	Düsseldorfer EG	DEL	40	4	14	18	0	4	1	1	2	0
1997–98	Södertälje SK	SEL	25	2	11	13	14	—	—	—	—	—
1998–99	Tappara	SM-l	41	4	6	10	14	—	—	—	—	—
SM-l totals			212	100	125	225	128	25	10	19	29	10
NHL totals			423	118	147	265	139	18	3	8	11	14

=== International ===
Year	Team	Event	GP	G	A	Pts	PIM
1982	Finland	EJC	5	3	0	3	4
1983	Finland	EJC	5	1	3	4	8
1984	Finland	WJC	7	1	2	3	0
1985	Finland	WJC	7	11	2	13	6
1985	Finland	WC	8	2	2	4	2
1987	Finland	CC	5	1	1	2	12
1992	Finland	OLY	5	3	3	6	0
1992	Finland	WC	8	2	8	10	0
1994	Finland	OLY	8	2	3	5	4
1994	Finland	WC	8	5	4	9	6
Junior totals			24	16	7	23	18
Senior totals			42	15	21	36	24

Preceded by Teemu Selänne	Winner of the Kultainen kypärä trophy 1991–92	Succeeded by Juha Riihijärvi
Preceded by Bryan Maxwell	Lethbridge Hurricanes head coach 2002–04	Succeeded by Lindsay Hofford
