= Kai Nurminen =

Finnish ice hockey player

- Born: 29 March 1969 (age 56) Turku, Finland
- Height: 6 ft 1 in (185 cm)
- Weight: 207 lb (94 kg; 14 st 11 lb)
- Position: Left wing
- Shot: Left
- Played for: TPS; HPK; HV71; Los Angeles Kings; Jokerit; Frölunda HC; HC Davos; Cleveland Lumberjacks; Minnesota Wild; Herlev Hornets
- National team: Finland
- NHL draft: 193rd overall, 1996; Los Angeles Kings
- Playing career: 1992–2009

Kai Ilmari Nurminen (born 29 March 1969) is a Finnish former professional ice hockey forward, who last played with Herlev Hornets in the Danish Oddset Ligaen.

== Career ==
Nurminen started and played most of his ice hockey career with TPS in SM-liiga. He has also played for two seasons in the Swedish Elitserien.

During the 1994–1995 season, he played successfully with Esa Keskinen for HV71, together making up a fearsome duo.

For the 1996–97 season, he was contracted by Los Angeles Kings in NHL. After only one season in NHL with 67 matches played (scoring 16 goals and 11 assists) he returned to Scandinavia. In the 2000–01 season, he played two games for the Minnesota Wild and registered one goal.

Nurminen also played for HPK and Jokerit in SM-liiga; HC Davos in Nationalliga A; and Frölunda HC and HV71 in Elitserien.

Nurminen won the Finnish Championship twice. He also won the 1993 European Champions Cup with TPS.

Nurminen scored 7 goals in 12 games in World Championships and 243 goals in SM-liiga. During the 1999–2000 season he played 64 games and scored 46 goals in SM-liiga.

Nurminen ended his active playing career with the Danish team Herlev Hornets.

== Career statistics ==
=== Regular season and playoffs ===
			Regular season					Playoffs
Season	Team	League	GP	G	A	Pts	PIM	GP	G	A	Pts	PIM
1986–87	TPS	FIN U18	15	13	17	30	12	—	—	—	—	—
1986–87	TPS	FIN U20	2	0	1	1	0	—	—	—	—	—
1987–88	TPS	FIN U20	32	9	7	16	16	—	—	—	—	—
1989–90	TPS	FIN U20	35	28	17	45	32	—	—	—	—	—
1990–91	TuTo	FIN.2	33	26	20	46	14	—	—	—	—	—
1991–92	Kiekko-67	FIN.2	44	44	19	63	34	—	—	—	—	—
1992–93	Kiekko-67	FIN.2	8	6	4	10	2	—	—	—	—	—
1992–93	TPS	SM-l	31	4	6	10	13	7	1	2	3	0
1993–94	TPS	SM-l	45	23	12	35	20	11	0	3	3	4
1994–95	HPK	SM-l	49	30	25	55	40	—	—	—	—	—
1995–96	HV71	SEL	40	31	24	55	30	4	3	1	4	8
1996–97	Los Angeles Kings	NHL	67	16	11	27	22	—	—	—	—	—
1997–98	Västra Frölunda HC	SEL	23	9	7	16	24	—	—	—	—	—
1997–98	Jokerit	SM-l	20	7	9	16	6	8	5	3	8	4
1998–99	HC Davos	NDA	42	26	14	40	26	—	—	—	—	—
1999–2000	TPS	SM-l	54	41	37	78	40	10	5	9	14	0
2000–01	Minnesota Wild	NHL	2	1	0	1	2	—	—	—	—	—
2000–01	Cleveland Lumberjacks	IHL	74	28	46	74	34	1	0	0	0	0
2001–02	TPS	SM-l	52	15	18	33	42	8	0	2	2	2
2002–03	TPS	SM-l	56	22	18	40	44	7	0	1	1	0
2003–04	TPS	SM-l	52	23	22	45	18	13	6	3	9	33
2004–05	TPS	SM-l	54	25	24	49	42	6	1	3	4	6
2005–06	TPS	SM-l	55	14	17	31	44	2	0	1	1	4
2006–07	TPS	SM-l	44	20	20	40	42	2	1	0	1	4
2007–08	HPK	SM-l	26	8	11	19	18	—	—	—	—	—
2008–09	Herlev Hornets	DNK	12	2	5	7	18	—	—	—	—	—
2010–11	PaKa	FIN.4	1	0	2	2	2	—	—	—	—	—
SM-l totals			538	232	219	451	369	74	19	27	46	57
SEL totals			63	40	31	71	54	4	3	1	4	8
NHL totals			69	17	11	28	24	—	—	—	—	—

=== International ===
Year	Team	Event	GP	G	A	Pts	PIM
1996	Finland	WC	6	4	2	6	6
1996	Finland	WCH	2	0	1	1	0
1997	Finland	WC	6	3	0	3	0
Senior totals			14	7	3	10	6
