= 2020–21 Liiga season =

2020–21 SM-liiga
- League: SM-liiga
- Sport: Ice hockey
- Duration: October 2020 – May 2021
- Teams: 15
- TV partner(s): Telia; C More

Regular season
- Best record: Lukko
- Runners-up: HIFK
- Season MVP: Robin Press (Lukko)
- Top scorer: Petri Kontiola (HPK)

Playoffs
- Playoffs MVP: Eetu Koivistoinen (Lukko)
- Finals champions: Lukko
- Runners-up: TPS

SM-liiga seasons
- ← 2019–20 2021–22 →

The 2020–21 SM-liiga season was the 46th season of the SM-liiga, the top level of ice hockey in Finland, since the league's formation in 1975. Due to the COVID-19 pandemic all the games had to be played to a very limited audience or no audience at all. Two teams have temporarily let go of their coaches due to financial reasons: JYP and SaiPa. The season was Hakametsä's last full season.

== Teams ==
Location of teams in 2020–2021 Liiga

Team	City	Head coach	Arena	Capacity	Captain
HIFK	Helsinki	Jarno Pikkarainen	Helsingin jäähalli	8,200	Jere Sallinen
HPK	Hämeenlinna	Matti Tiilikainen	Pohjantähti Areena	5,360	Markus Nenonen
Ilves	Tampere	Jouko Myrrä	Tampereen jäähalli	7,300	Eemeli Suomi
Jukurit	Mikkeli	~~Marko Kauppinen~~12.3.2021; Jari Kauppila	Ikioma Areena	4,200	Jesper Piitulainen
JYP	Jyväskylä	Mikko Viitanen (27.12.2020–); Jussi Tupamäki (21.10.2020–27.12.2020); Pekka Tirkkonen (furloughed 21.10.2020–31.3.2021)	LähiTapiola Areena	4,437	Jani Tuppurainen
KalPa	Kuopio	Tommi Miettinen	Olvi Areena	5,300	Tommi Jokinen
KooKoo	Kouvola	Jussi Ahokas	Lumon Areena	5,950	Alexander Bonsaksen
Kärpät	Oulu	Mikko Manner	Oulun Energia Areena	6,400	Mika Pyörälä
Lukko	Rauma	Pekka Virta	Kivikylän Areena	4,700	Heikki Liedes
Pelicans	Lahti	Tommi Niemelä	Isku Areena	5,371	Hannes Björninen
SaiPa	Lappeenranta	Ville Hämäläinen (8.11.2020–27.3.2021); Tero Lehterä (furloughed 8.11.2020–27.3.2021)	Lappeenrannan jäähalli	4,820	Jarno Koskiranta
Sport	Vaasa	Risto Dufva	Vaasan Sähkö Areena	4,164	Erik Riska
Tappara	Tampere	Jussi Tapola	Tampereen jäähalli	7,300	Jukka Peltola
TPS	Turku	Raimo Helminen	Gatorade Center	11,820	Lauri Korpikoski
Ässät	Pori	Ari-Pekka Selin	Isomäki Areena	6,350	Niklas Appelgren

== Regular season ==
Top six advanced straight to the quarter-finals, while teams between 7th and 10th positions played a wild card round for the final two spots. The SM-liiga is a closed series and thus there is no relegation. Due to several games having been cancelled due to COVID-19 cases in various teams in March 2021, not all teams got an even number of games, therefore SM-liiga decided that the rankings of the regular season will be determined by points per game average.

Pos	Team	Pld	W	D	L	GF	GA	GD	W+	Pts	PPG	Final Result
1	Lukko	60	38	7	15	204	114	90	6	127	2.12	Advance to Quarterfinals
2	HIFK	50	26	11	13	153	113	40	7	96	1.92	Advance to Quarterfinals
3	TPS	59	27	18	14	165	140	25	7	106	1.80	Advance to Quarterfinals
4	Tappara	59	26	13	20	171	151	20	8	99	1.68	Advance to Quarterfinals
5	KalPa	58	25	15	18	152	125	27	7	97	1.67	Advance to Quarterfinals
6	Pelicans	58	25	12	21	169	147	22	10	97	1.67	Advance to Quarterfinals
7	Kärpät	58	25	12	21	143	134	9	10	97	1.67	Advance to Wild-card round
8	Ilves	53	25	10	18	161	142	19	3	88	1.66	Advance to Wild-card round
9	KooKoo	55	25	11	19	165	125	40	5	91	1.65	Advance to Wild-card round
10	Sport	54	19	12	23	123	140	−17	6	75	1.39	Advance to Wild-card round
11	HPK	57	16	19	22	143	172	−29	6	73	1.28	
12	Ässät	58	15	15	28	150	193	−43	6	66	1.14	
13	SaiPa	53	13	9	31	95	147	−52	3	51	0.96	
14	Jukurit	57	13	10	34	120	199	−79	5	54	0.95	
15	JYP	59	13	12	34	139	211	−72	4	55	0.93	

Source: Liiga

Rules for classification: 1) Points per game; 2) 3-point wins 3) Goal difference; 4) Goals scored; 5) Head-to-head points.

== Playoffs ==
Contrary to the best of three format used in the past seasons, the wild-card round will take place in two games and the aggregate score decides the team which advances. The remaining rounds will be played in the best-of-5 format instead of the typical best-of-7 format

=== Bracket ===
Wild-card round (agg-of-2)
8	Ilves	6
9	KooKoo	4
7	Kärpät	7
10	Sport	3

Quarter-finals (best-of-5)
1	Lukko	3
8	Ilves	0
4	Tappara	3
5	KalPa	1
2	HIFK	3
7	Kärpät	0
3	TPS	3
6	Pelicans	2

Semi-finals (best-of-5)
1	Lukko	3
4	Tappara	1
(Pairings are re-seeded after the first and second round)
2	HIFK	1
3	TPS	3

Finals (best-of-5)
1	Lukko	3
3	TPS	1
Bronze medal game
2	HIFK	7
4	Tappara	1

=== Wild-card round ===
The worse ranked team will play the first game at home. The aggregate score of the two games decides the winner of the round. There will be no over-time or penalty shoot-outs in the first game even if the score is tied. If the aggregate score is tied after the second game, overtime will be played in 20 minute periods until a goal is scored.

Team 1	Agg.	Team 2	1st leg	2nd leg
Sport	3–7	Kärpät	2–4	1–3
KooKoo	4–6	Ilves	1–4	3–2

=== Quarter-finals ===
Lukko – Ilves 3-0
19.4.2021	Lukko	Ilves	5-3 ref
20.4.2021	Lukko	Ilves	4-1 ref
22.4.2021	Ilves	Lukko	2-5 ref
Lukko wins the series 3-0.

TPS – Pelicans 3-2
19.4.2021	TPS	Pelicans	3-5 ref
20.4.2021	TPS	Pelicans	2-0 ref
22.4.2021	Pelicans	TPS	2-3 ref
23.4.2021	Pelicans	TPS	5-3 ref
25.4.2021	TPS	Pelicans	2-1 ref
TPS wins the series 3-2.

HIFK – Kärpät 3-0
19.4.2021	HIFK	Kärpät	3-2 ref
20.4.2021	HIFK	Kärpät	5-4 OT2 ref
22.4.2021	Kärpät	HIFK	2-5 ref
HIFK wins the series 3-0.

Tappara – KalPa 3-1
19.4.2021	Tappara	KalPa	1-0 ref
20.4.2021	Tappara	KalPa	3-4 OT2 ref
22.4.2021	KalPa	Tappara	1-2 ref
23.4.2021	KalPa	Tappara	2-3 ref
Tappara wins the series 3-1.

=== Semi-finals ===
Lukko – Tappara 3-1
29.4.2021	Lukko	Tappara	3-2 OT1 ref
30.4.2021	Lukko	Tappara	1-4 ref
2.5.2021	Tappara	Lukko	1-4 ref
3.5.2021	Tappara	Lukko	0-1 ref
Lukko wins the series 3-1.

HIFK – TPS 1-3
29.4.2021	HIFK	TPS	4-1 ref
30.4.2021	HIFK	TPS	2-3 OT1 ref
2.5.2021	TPS	HIFK	3-0 ref
3.5.2021	TPS	HIFK	3-2 OT1 ref
TPS wins the series 3-1.

=== Bronze medal game ===
6 May 2021; 18:30	HIFK	7–1 (4–0, 3–0, 0–1)	Tappara	Helsinki Ice Hall, Helsinki

Game reference

Frans Tuohimaa
Goalies
Christian Heljanko
Dominik Hrachovina
Referees:
Antti Boman
Jani Luoma-aho
Linesmen:
Niko Jusi
Joni Pekkala

J. Saarinen (D. Bernhardt, J. Jääskä) – 04:37	1–0
J. Sallinen (V. Varakas, V. Leskinen) – 05:48	2–0
M-M Åsten (E. Teräväinen, J. Motin) (PP1) – 14:56	3–0
H. Borgström (V. Leskinen, A. Lundell) (PP1) – 15:44	4–0
J. Sallinen (V. Leskinen, A. Lundell) – 20:32	5–0
T. Tallberg (S. Dyk, A. Broadhurst) – 21:16	6–0
V. Varakas (A. Broadhurst, S. Dyk) – 24:26	7–0
	7–1	45:51 – J. Peltola (A. Levtchi, M. Moravčík)

2 min
Penalties
27 min
30
Shots
20

=== Finals ===
7 May 2021; 18:30	Lukko	1–4 (0–1, 1–1, 0–2)	TPS	Kivikylän Areena, Rauma

Game reference

Lassi Lehtinen
Goalies
Karri Rämö
Referees:
Lassi Heikkinen
Kristian Vikman
Linesmen:
Joona Elonen
Markus Hägerström

	0–1	11:55 – H. Larsson (R. Ishakov, J. Kestner) (PP1)
	0–2	23:16 – T. Haapanen (J. Pärssinen, L. Pajuniemi)
R. Press (T. Gregoire, A. Saarela) (PP1) – 33:45	1–2
	1–3	52:53 – L. Pajuniemi
	1–4	56:24 – L. Pajuniemi (M. Pyyhtiä)

42 min
Penalties
35 min
36
Shots
19

8 May 2021; 17:00	Lukko	4–0 (0–0, 2–0, 2–0)	TPS	Kivikylän Areena, Rauma

Game reference

Lassi Lehtinen
Goalies
Andrei Kareyev
Referees:
Antti Boman
Mikko Kaukokari
Linesmen:
Onni Hautamäki
Jussi Thomann

E. Koivistoinen (V. Saarijärvi, P. Skalický) – 34:35	1–0
A. Saarela (S. Repo, V. Saarijärvi) – 36:37	2–0
T. Gregoire (H. Liedes) – 51:18	3–0
S. Repo (V. Saarijärvi, E. Koivistoinen) (ENG) – 58:19	4–0

4 min
Penalties
8 min
41
Shots
13

10 May 2021; 16:00	TPS	1–3 (0–1, 0–0, 1–2)	Lukko	Gatorade Center, Turku

Game reference

Karri Rämö
Goalies
Lassi Lehtinen
Referees:
Antti Boman
Mikko Kaukokari
Linesmen:
Joona Elonen
Markus Hägerström

	0–1	17:21 – R. Press (PS)
	0–2	58:15 – S. Repo (A. Saarela) (ENG)
	0–3	58:46 – P. Skalický (H. Liedes, E. Koivistoinen) (ENG)
A. Intonen (T. Haapanen, J. Janatuinen) – 59:51	1–3

10 min
Penalties
8 min
22
Shots
29

11 May 2021; 16:00	TPS	2–6 (0–2, 2–2, 0–2)	Lukko	Gatorade Center, Turku

Game reference

Karri Rämö
Goalies
Lassi Lehtinen
Referees:
Antti Boman
Mikko Kaukokari
Linesmen:
Joona Elonen
Markus Hägerström

	0–1	11:01 – T. Koivisto (E. Koivistoinen, R. Press)
	0–2	16:08 – J. Mattila (K. Pospíšil, P. Skalický)
J. Kestner (H. Larsson) – 28:12	1–2
A. Anttalainen (J. Pärssinen) – 33:23	2–2
	2–3	34:57 – P. Skalický (K. Pospíšil)
	2–4	36:29 – E. Koivistoinen (A. Hakulinen, J. Tammela)
	2–5	56:05 – H. Liedes (V. Saarijärvi) (SH1, ENG)
	2–6	56:33 – E. Koivistoinen (S. Repo, L. Klok) (SH1, ENG)

8 min
Penalties
4 min
16
Shots
24

Lukko wins the finals 3–1.

== Final rankings ==
Gold medal	Lukko
Silver medal	TPS
Bronze medal	HIFK
4	Tappara
5	KalPa
6	Pelicans
7	Kärpät
8	Ilves
9	KooKoo
10	Sport
11	HPK
12	Ässät
13	SaiPa
14	Jukurit
15	JYP

== See also ==
- 2020–21 Mestis season
