= 2010 Stanley Cup playoffs =

Tournament details
- Dates: April 14–June 9, 2010
- Teams: 16
- Defending champions: Pittsburgh Penguins

Final positions
- Champions: Chicago Blackhawks
- Runners-up: Philadelphia Flyers

Tournament statistics
- Scoring leader(s): Daniel Briere (Flyers) (30 points)

Awards
- MVP: Jonathan Toews (Blackhawks)

The 2010 Stanley Cup playoffs of the National Hockey League (NHL) began on April 14, 2010, after the 2009–10 NHL regular season. The Final ended on June 9, 2010, with the Chicago Blackhawks defeating the Philadelphia Flyers in six games to win their fourth championship and their first since 1961. Blackhawks center and team captain Jonathan Toews was awarded the Conn Smythe Trophy as the playoffs' most valuable player.

The Washington Capitals made the playoffs as the Presidents' Trophy winners with the most points (i.e. best record) during the regular season. The Detroit Red Wings increased their postseason appearance streak to nineteen seasons, the longest active streak at the time.

This NHL post-season was noted for the unexpected playoff successes of two teams: the Philadelphia Flyers and Montreal Canadiens, who were the seventh and eighth seeds in their conference and were tied for points. The Flyers became the third NHL team to win a seven-game series after being down 3–0 (the others being the 1942 Toronto Maple Leafs and the 1975 New York Islanders). The Flyers went on to play in the Stanley Cup Final, losing to Chicago. Meanwhile, the Canadiens became the first eighth-seeded team in NHL history to win a series against the first-seeded team after being down 3–1 in a series, when they beat the Washington Capitals in the first round. After upsetting the defending Cup champions Pittsburgh Penguins in the second round, the Canadiens became the first eighth-seeded team to compete in the Eastern Conference Final since the current playoff format was implemented in 1994. Previously, only the eighth-seeded 2006 Edmonton Oilers had accomplished a similar feat, winning the 2006 Western Conference Final. As a result of the Canadiens having the eighth seed, the Flyers became the first seventh-seed to have home-ice advantage in the conference finals since the current playoff format was instituted.

== Playoff seeds ==
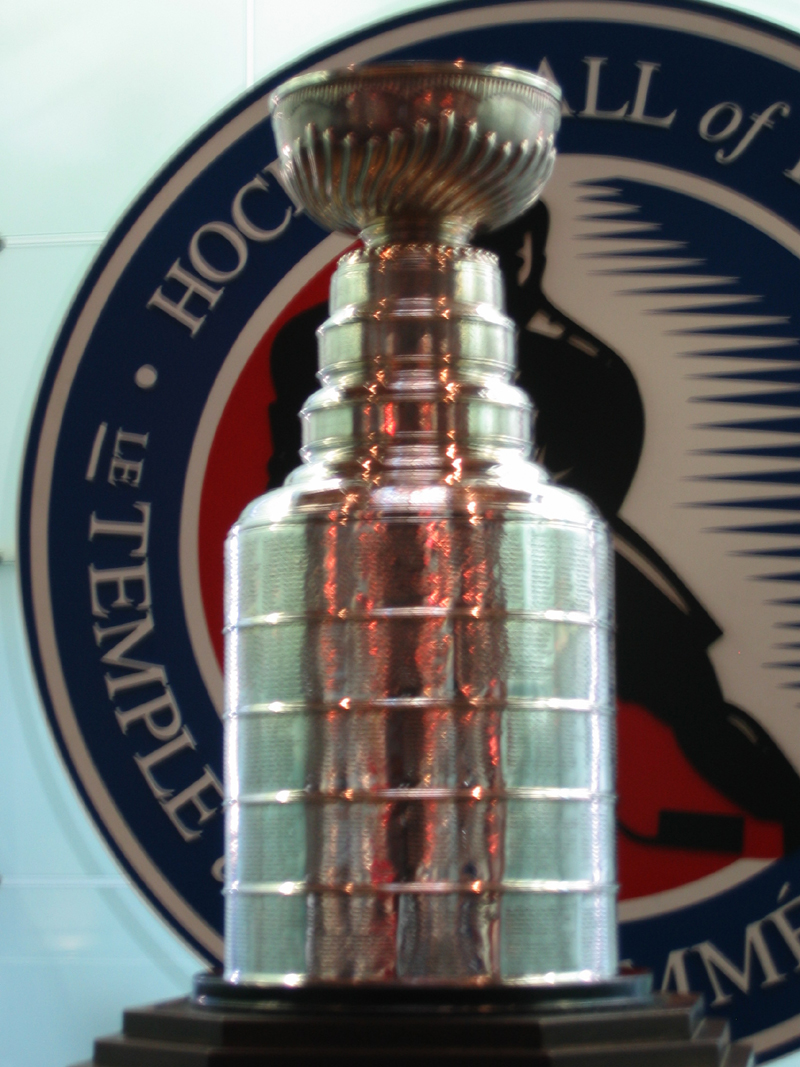
The Stanley Cup

The top eight teams in each conference qualified for the playoffs. The top three seeds in each conference were awarded to the division winners; while the five remaining spots were awarded to the highest finishers in their respective conferences.

The following teams qualified for the playoffs:

=== Eastern Conference ===
1. Washington Capitals, Southeast Division champions, Eastern Conference regular season champions, President's Trophy winners – 121 points
2. New Jersey Devils, Atlantic Division champions – 103 points
3. Buffalo Sabres, Northeast Division champions – 100 points
4. Pittsburgh Penguins – 101 points
5. Ottawa Senators – 94 points
6. Boston Bruins – 91 points
7. Philadelphia Flyers – 88 points (41 wins)
8. Montreal Canadiens – 88 points (39 wins)

=== Western Conference ===
1. San Jose Sharks, Pacific Division champions, Western Conference regular season champions – 113 points
2. Chicago Blackhawks, Central Division champions – 112 points
3. Vancouver Canucks, Northwest Division champions – 103 points
4. Phoenix Coyotes – 107 points
5. Detroit Red Wings – 102 points
6. Los Angeles Kings – 101 points
7. Nashville Predators – 100 points
8. Colorado Avalanche – 95 points

== Playoff bracket ==
In each round, teams competed in a best-of-seven series following a 2–2–1–1–1 format (scores in the bracket indicate the number of games won in each best-of-seven series). The team with home ice advantage played at home for games one and two (and games five and seven, if necessary), and the other team played at home for games three and four (and game six, if necessary). The top eight teams in each conference made the playoffs, with the three division winners seeded 1–3 based on regular season record, and the five remaining teams seeded 4–8.

The NHL used "re-seeding" instead of a fixed bracket playoff system. During the first three rounds, the highest remaining seed in each conference was matched against the lowest remaining seed, the second-highest remaining seed played the second-lowest remaining seed, and so forth. The higher-seeded team was awarded home ice advantage. The two conference winners then advanced to the Stanley Cup Final, where home ice advantage was awarded to the team that had the better regular season record.

Conference quarterfinals	Conference semifinals
1	Washington	3
8	Montreal	4
4	Pittsburgh	3
8	Montreal	4
5	Ottawa	2
4	Pittsburgh	4
Eastern Conference
3	Buffalo	2
6	Boston	4
6	Boston	3
7	Philadelphia	4
7	Philadelphia	4
2	New Jersey	1
1	San Jose	4
8	Colorado	2
1	San Jose	4
5	Detroit	1
2	Chicago	4
7	Nashville	2
Western Conference
3	Vancouver	4
6	Los Angeles	2
2	Chicago	4
3	Vancouver	2
4	Phoenix	3
5	Detroit	4

Conference finals
8	Montreal	1
7	Philadelphia	4
1	San Jose	0
2	Chicago	4

Stanley Cup Final
E7	Philadelphia	2
W2	Chicago	4

== Conference quarterfinals ==
=== Eastern Conference quarterfinals ===
==== (1) Washington Capitals vs. (8) Montreal Canadiens ====
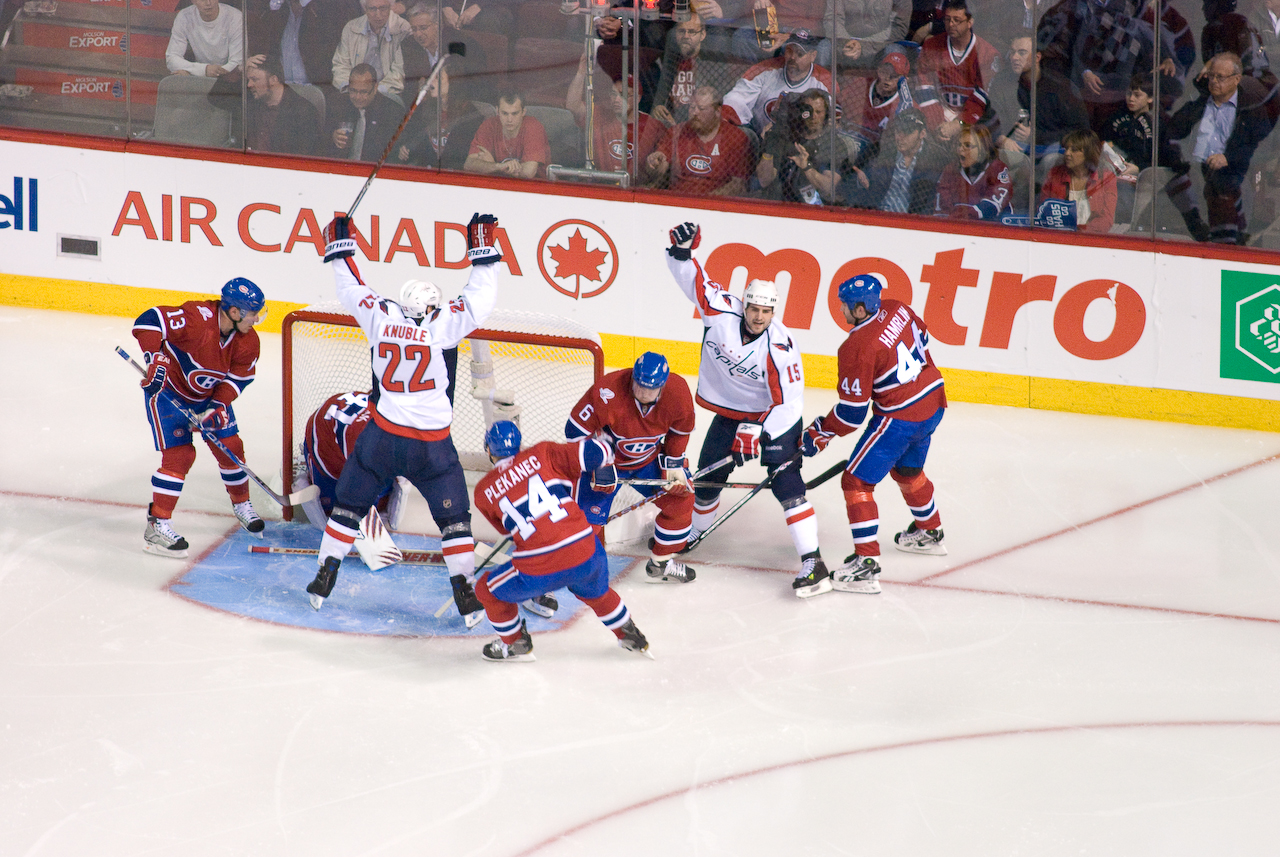
The Capitals playing the Canadiens in the 2010 playoffs

The Washington Capitals entered the playoffs as the Presidents' Trophy winner, earning the NHL's best regular season record with 121 points. The Montreal Canadiens qualified for the playoffs as the eighth seed with 88 points, losing the tiebreaker over Philadelphia on total wins (41 to 39). This was the first playoff meeting between the two teams, and the sole meeting until the 2025 Stanley Cup playoffs. The teams split this year's four-game regular season series.

Montreal's point difference in the series was the fifth largest point differential (33 points) for a lower-seeded team beating a higher-seeded team in playoff history. It was also the first time an eighth-seeded team came back against a number one seed after being down 3–1 in the series, and the only time until 2023 when the Florida Panthers did so against the Boston Bruins. Montreal goaltender Jaroslav Halak made 45 saves and Tomas Plekanec won game one for the Canadiens with his goal 13:19 into the first overtime period. Washington forward Nicklas Backstrom scored the overtime winner in game two and completed a hat-trick with his goal 31 seconds into the first overtime period to give Washington a 6–5 win; Andrei Kostitsyn also scored a hat-trick during this game in a losing effort for the Canadiens. After a scoreless opening period in game three, the Capitals scored four times in the second period as they earned a 5–1 victory. Washington forward Alexander Ovechkin recorded three points as the Capitals won game four 6–3. Jaroslav Halak returned in game five for Montreal after sitting out the previous game and posted 37 saves as the Canadiens avoided elimination with a 2–1 win. Michael Cammalleri scored twice in the opening period of game six for Montreal and Jaroslav Halak made 53 saves as the Canadiens forced a seventh-game with a 4–1 victory. Montreal forward Dominic Moore scored the series-clinching goal late in the third period of game seven as the Canadiens hung on to a 2–1 decision.

April 15	Montreal Canadiens	3–2	OT	Washington Capitals	Verizon Center	Recap
Michael Cammalleri (1) – pp – 12:36		First period		15:33 – Joe Corvo (1)
No scoring		Second period		No scoring
Scott Gomez (1) – 07:34		Third period		00:47 – Nicklas Backstrom (1)
Tomas Plekanec (1) – 13:19		First overtime period		No scoring
Jaroslav Halak 45 saves / 47 shots		Goalie stats		Jose Theodore 35 saves / 38 shots

April 17	Montreal Canadiens	5–6	OT	Washington Capitals	Verizon Center	Recap
Brian Gionta (1) – 01:00; Andrei Kostitsyn (1) – 07:58		First period		10:21 – Eric Fehr (1)
Andrei Kostitsyn (2) – 11:06; Andrei Kostitsyn (3) – pp – 17:44		Second period		18:23 – Nicklas Backstrom (2)
Tomas Plekanec (2) – 14:54		Third period		02:56 – Alexander Ovechkin (1); 09:47 – Nicklas Backstrom (3); 18:39 – John Carlson (1)
No scoring		First overtime period		00:31 – Nicklas Backstrom (4)
Jaroslav Halak 31 saves / 37 shots		Goalie stats		Jose Theodore 0 saves / 2 shots Semyon Varlamov 19 saves / 22 shots

April 19	Washington Capitals	5–1	Montreal Canadiens	Bell Centre	Recap
No scoring		First period	No scoring
Boyd Gordon (1) – sh – 01:06; Brooks Laich (1) – 04:42; Eric Fehr (2) – 08:33; Alexander Ovechkin (2) – 13:50		Second period	No scoring
Matt Bradley (1) – 19:15		Third period	02:25 – pp – Tomas Plekanec (3)
Semyon Varlamov 26 saves / 27 shots		Goalie stats	Jaroslav Halak 10 saves / 13 shots Carey Price 21 saves / 23 shots

April 21	Washington Capitals	6–3	Montreal Canadiens	Bell Centre	Recap
Alexander Ovechkin (3) – pp – 08:10		First period	09:12 – Michael Cammalleri (2)
Mike Knuble (1) – sh – 19:53		Second period	15:42 – pp – Brian Gionta (2)
Alexander Ovechkin (4) – 11:09; Jason Chimera (1) – 12:01; Mike Knuble (2) – en – 17:33; Nicklas Backstrom (5) – en – 19:49		Third period	18:42 – Dominic Moore (1)
Semyon Varlamov 36 saves / 39 shots		Goalie stats	Carey Price 32 saves / 36 shots

April 23	Montreal Canadiens	2–1	Washington Capitals	Verizon Center	Recap
Michael Cammalleri (3) – 01:30; Travis Moen (1) – 07:01		First period	No scoring
No scoring		Second period	03:52 – Alexander Ovechkin (5)
No scoring		Third period	No scoring
Jaroslav Halak 37 saves / 38 shots		Goalie stats	Semyon Varlamov 26 saves / 28 shots

April 26	Washington Capitals	1–4	Montreal Canadiens	Bell Centre	Recap
No scoring		First period	07:30 – pp – Michael Cammalleri (4); 09:09 – Michael Cammalleri (5)
No scoring		Second period	No scoring
Eric Fehr (3) – 15:10		Third period	04:17 – Maxim Lapierre (1); 19:03 – en – Tomas Plekanec (4)
Semyon Varlamov 18 saves / 21 shots		Goalie stats	Jaroslav Halak 53 saves / 54 shots

April 28	Montreal Canadiens	2–1	Washington Capitals	Verizon Center	Recap
Marc-Andre Bergeron (1) – pp – 19:30		First period	No scoring
No scoring		Second period	No scoring
Dominic Moore (2) – 16:24		Third period	17:44 – Brooks Laich (2)
Jaroslav Halak 41 saves / 42 shots		Goalie stats	Semyon Varlamov 14 saves / 16 shots

Montreal won series 4–3

==== (2) New Jersey Devils vs. (7) Philadelphia Flyers ====
The New Jersey Devils entered the playoffs as the second overall seed in the Eastern Conference after winning the Atlantic Division with 103 points. The Philadelphia Flyers qualified as the seventh seed with 88 points, winning the tiebreaker over Montreal on total wins (41 to 39). This was the fifth playoff meeting between these two teams, with the teams splitting the four previous series. They last met in the 2004 Eastern Conference quarterfinals where Philadelphia won in five games. Philadelphia won five of the six games during this year's regular season series.

The Flyers upset the Devils in five games. Philadelphia goaltender Brian Boucher made 23 saves in game one as the Flyers took the opening game 2–1. Devils forward Dainius Zubrus broke the tie in game two with just over four minutes remaining in the game as New Jersey evened the series with 5–3 victory. Daniel Carcillo scored the overtime winner for the Flyers in a 3–2 win in game three. Brian Boucher made 30 saves and Jeff Carter added two goals in game four as the Flyers pushed New Jersey to the brink of elimination with a 4–1 triumph. Philadelphia ended the series in game five with a 3–0 shutout; Boucher made 28 saves in the victory.

April 14	Philadelphia Flyers	2–1	New Jersey Devils	Prudential Center	Recap
No scoring		First period	No scoring
Chris Pronger (1) – pp – 09:25; Mike Richards (1) – 16:27		Second period	No scoring
No scoring		Third period	17:17 – Travis Zajac (1)
Brian Boucher 23 saves / 24 shots		Goalie stats	Martin Brodeur 12 saves / 14 shots

April 16	Philadelphia Flyers	3–5	New Jersey Devils	Prudential Center	Recap
Arron Asham (1) – 09:33; Claude Giroux (1) – pp – 15:30		First period	02:45 – sh – Zach Parise (1)
Chris Pronger (2) – pp – 18:48		Second period	03:44 – Colin White (1); 13:25 – pp – Andy Greene (1)
No scoring		Third period	15:56 – Dainius Zubrus (1); 19:27 – en – Ilya Kovalchuk (1)
Brian Boucher 28 saves / 32 shots		Goalie stats	Martin Brodeur 26 saves / 29 shots

April 18	New Jersey Devils	2–3	OT	Philadelphia Flyers	Wachovia Center	Recap
Brian Rolston (1) – pp – 07:15		First period		08:49 – pp – Claude Giroux (2)
Brian Rolston (2) – pp – 16:38		Second period		01:15 – Mike Richards (2)
No scoring		Third period		No scoring
No scoring		First overtime period		03:35 – Daniel Carcillo (1)
Martin Brodeur 31 saves / 34 shots		Goalie stats		Brian Boucher 17 saves / 19 shots

April 20	New Jersey Devils	1–4	Philadelphia Flyers	Wachovia Center	Recap
Ilya Kovalchuk (2) – pp – 12:24		First period	No scoring
No scoring		Second period	09:08 – pp – Jeff Carter (1); 17:27 – Daniel Briere (1)
No scoring		Third period	04:10 – Daniel Carcillo (2); 09:28 – Jeff Carter (2)
Martin Brodeur 24 saves / 28 shots		Goalie stats	Brian Boucher 30 saves / 31 shots

April 22	Philadelphia Flyers	3–0	New Jersey Devils	Prudential Center	Recap
Daniel Briere (2) – 03:16		First period	No scoring
Claude Giroux (3) – 11:48; Claude Giroux (4) – pp – 13:47		Second period	No scoring
No scoring		Third period	No scoring
Brian Boucher 28 saves / 28 shots		Goalie stats	Martin Brodeur 17 saves / 20 shots

Philadelphia won series 4–1

==== (3) Buffalo Sabres vs. (6) Boston Bruins ====
The Buffalo Sabres entered the playoffs as the third overall seed in the Eastern Conference after winning the Northeast Division title with 100 points. The Boston Bruins qualified as the sixth seed with 91 points. This was the eighth playoff meeting between these two teams, with Boston winning five of the seven previous series. They last met in the 1999 Eastern Conference semifinals where Buffalo won in six games. Boston won four of the six games during this year's regular season series.

The Bruins eliminated the Sabres in six games. Buffalo goaltender Ryan Miller made 38 saves as the Sabres took the opening game of the series. Michael Ryder and Zdeno Chara each scored twice in game two as the Bruins overcame a one-goal deficit entering the third period, taking the game 5–3. Boston broke the tie in game three with a goal from Patrice Bergeron with just over seven minutes remaining in regulation time. Buffalo squandered a two-goal lead in third period of game four as the Bruins forced overtime; at 7:41 of the second overtime period Miroslav Satan scored the game-winning goal for Boston, giving them a 3–1 series lead. The Sabres extended the series in game five with a 4–1 victory; at the end of the game, five players were assessed penalties after an altercation including Boston captain Zdeno Chara who was given an instigator penalty. As the penalty occurred in the final five minutes of the game Chara should have been suspended for game six, but the league rescinded the instigator penalty after the game, allowing Chara to avoid suspension. Miroslav Satan scored the series-winning goal in game six as Boston held on to a 4–3 win.

April 15	Boston Bruins	1–2	Buffalo Sabres	HSBC Arena	Recap
No scoring		First period	04:52 –Thomas Vanek (1)
Mark Recchi (1) – pp – 09:30		Second period	14:10 – Craig Rivet (1)
No scoring		Third period	No scoring
Tuukka Rask 30 saves / 32 shots		Goalie stats	Ryan Miller 38 saves / 39 shots

April 17	Boston Bruins	5–3	Buffalo Sabres	HSBC Arena	Recap
No scoring		First period	02:55 – Tyler Myers (1); 12:00 – Matt Ellis (1)
Michael Ryder (1) – 02:35; Zdeno Chara (1) – 09:54		Second period	16:41 – Jason Pominville (1)
Michael Ryder (2) – 05:23; Zdeno Chara (2) – 07:23; Mark Recchi (2) – en – 19:40		Third period	No scoring
Tuukka Rask 26 saves / 29 shots		Goalie stats	Ryan Miller 26 saves / 30 shots

April 19	Buffalo Sabres	1–2	Boston Bruins	TD Garden	Recap
Mike Grier (1) – 06:57		First period	15:17 – Dennis Wideman (1)
No scoring		Second period	No scoring
No scoring		Third period	12:57 – Patrice Bergeron (1)
Ryan Miller 27 saves / 29 shots		Goalie stats	Tuukka Rask 32 saves / 33 shots

April 21	Buffalo Sabres	2–3	2OT	Boston Bruins	TD Garden	Recap
Tim Kennedy (1) – 02:12		First period		No scoring
Steve Montador (1) – 06:59		Second period		No scoring
No scoring		Third period		02:07 – pp – David Krejci (1); 06:40 – Patrice Bergeron (2)
No scoring		Second overtime period		07:41 – pp – Miroslav Satan (1)
Ryan Miller 36 saves / 39 shots		Goalie stats		Tuukka Rask 35 saves / 37 shots

April 23	Boston Bruins	1–4	Buffalo Sabres	HSBC Arena	Recap
No scoring		First period	01:54 – Adam Mair (1); 18:54 – Jason Pominville (2)
No scoring		Second period	09:22 – Mike Grier (2)
Johnny Boychuk (1) – pp – 19:30		Third period	18:17 – en – Tyler Ennis (1)
Tuukka Rask 29 saves / 32 shots		Goalie stats	Ryan Miller 34 saves / 35 shots

April 26	Buffalo Sabres	3–4	Boston Bruins	TD Garden	Recap
No scoring		First period	13:39 – David Krejci (2)
Patrick Kaleta (1) – 06:34		Second period	01:01 – pp – Mark Recchi (3)
Nathan Gerbe (1) – 07:40; Thomas Vanek (2) – 18:47		Third period	07:18 – David Krejci (3); 14:49 – Miroslav Satan (2)
Ryan Miller 28 saves / 32 shots		Goalie stats	Tuukka Rask 27 saves / 30 shots

Boston won series 4–2

==== (4) Pittsburgh Penguins vs. (5) Ottawa Senators ====
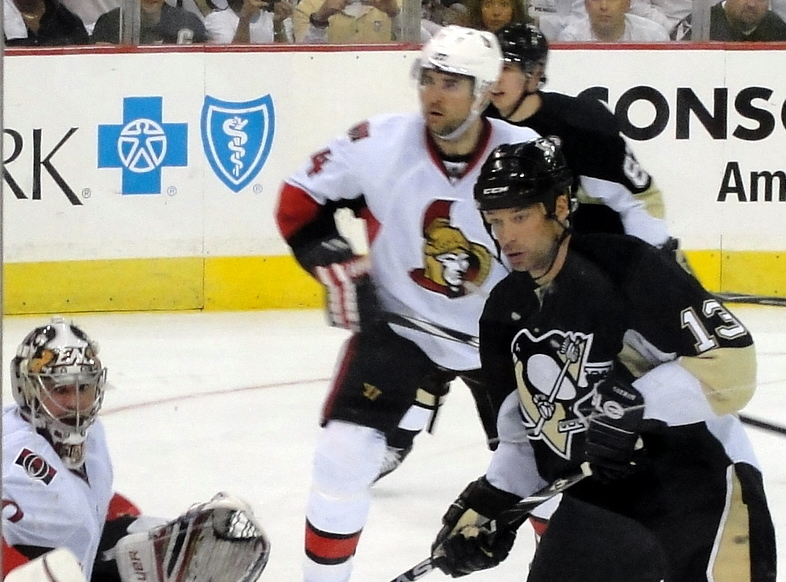
Pittsburgh's Bill Guerin plays in-front of the Senators net April 16.

The Pittsburgh Penguins entered the playoffs as the fourth seed in the Eastern Conference with 101 points. The Ottawa Senators qualified as the fifth seed with 94 points. This was the third playoff meeting between these two teams, with the teams splitting the two previous series. They last met in the 2008 Eastern Conference quarterfinals where Pittsburgh won in four games. The teams split this year's four-game regular season series.

The Penguins defeated the Senators in six games. Ottawa forward Jarkko Ruutu scored the game-winning goal in game one as the Senators took the opening game 5–4. Penguins captain Sidney Crosby had a goal and an assist as Pittsburgh evened the series with a 2–1 win. Evgeni Malkin broke the tie for the Penguins early in the second period of game three as they took the series lead with a 4–2 victory. Ottawa goaltender Brian Elliott was pulled in the second period of game four after allowing four goals; the Penguins won the game 7–4. Ottawa avoided elimination in game five thanks to a 56 save effort by Pascal Leclaire; Matt Carkner scored the game-winning goal at 7:06 of the third overtime period. Pittsburgh overcame a three-goal deficit in game six to force overtime, where Pascal Dupuis ended the series at 9:56 of the first overtime as the Penguins advanced past the opening round of the playoffs for the third straight year.

April 14	Ottawa Senators	5–4	Pittsburgh Penguins	Mellon Arena	Recap
Peter Regin (1) – 08:45; Chris Neil (1) – 14:08		First period	03:03 – pp – Evgeni Malkin (1)
Chris Kelly (1) – pp – 01:20; Erik Karlsson (1) – pp – 13:14		Second period	10:22 – pp – Evgeni Malkin (2)
Jarkko Ruutu (1) – 09:40		Third period	05:16 – Craig Adams (1); 17:36 – Alex Goligoski (1)
Brian Elliott 17 saves / 21 shots		Goalie stats	Marc-Andre Fleury 21 saves / 26 shots

April 16	Ottawa Senators	1–2	Pittsburgh Penguins	Mellon Arena	Recap
Peter Regin (2) – 00:18		First period	08:45 – Sidney Crosby (1)
No scoring		Second period	No scoring
No scoring		Third period	15:48 – Kris Letang (1)
Brian Elliott 29 saves / 31 shots		Goalie stats	Marc-Andre Fleury 19 saves / 20 shots

April 18	Pittsburgh Penguins	4–2	Ottawa Senators	Scotiabank Place	Recap
Alexei Ponikarovsky (1) – 01:17		First period	No scoring
Evgeni Malkin (3) – 05:57; Sidney Crosby (2) – pp – 19:15		Second period	01:53 – pp – Mike Fisher (1)
Bill Guerin (1) – 04:27		Third period	12:58 – pp – Matt Cullen (1)
Marc-Andre Fleury 20 saves / 22 shots		Goalie stats	Brian Elliott 20 saves / 24 shots

April 20	Pittsburgh Penguins	7–4	Ottawa Senators	Scotiabank Place	Recap
Evgeni Malkin (4) – pp – 11:50		First period	No scoring
Sidney Crosby (3) – 03:47; Matt Cooke (1) – 03:59; Sidney Crosby (4) –06:12; Maxime Talbot (1) – sh – 12:38; Chris Kunitz (1) – 18:11		Second period	07:06 – Chris Neil (2); 10:59 – Daniel Alfredsson (1); 13:19 – pp – Matt Cullen (2)
Jordan Staal (1) – pp – 12:27		Third period	07:37 – Jason Spezza (1)
Marc-Andre Fleury 26 saves / 30 shots		Goalie stats	Brian Elliott 15 saves / 19 shots Pascal Leclaire 20 saves / 23 shots

April 22	Ottawa Senators	4–3	3OT	Pittsburgh Penguins	Mellon Arena	Recap
Mike Fisher (2) – pp – 10:25; Jarkko Ruutu (2) – 11:33		First period		18:05 – pp – Kris Letang (2)
No scoring		Second period		18:34 – Chris Kunitz (2)
Peter Regin (3) – 10:24		Third period		09:01 – Sidney Crosby (5)
Matt Carkner (1) – 07:06		Third overtime period		No scoring
Pascal Leclaire 56 saves / 59 shots		Goalie stats		Marc-Andre Fleury 40 saves / 44 shots

April 24	Pittsburgh Penguins	4–3	OT	Ottawa Senators	Scotiabank Place	Recap
No scoring		First period		05:19 – Matt Cullen (3)
Matt Cooke (2) – 10:56		Second period		01:51 – Chris Neil (3); 09:48 – Daniel Alfredsson (2)
Bill Guerin (2) – pp – 07:03; Matt Cooke (3) – 12:24		Third period		No scoring
Pascal Dupuis (1) – 09:56		First overtime period		No scoring
Marc-Andre Fleury 28 saves / 31 shots		Goalie stats		Pascal Leclaire 39 saves / 43 shots

Pittsburgh won series 4–2

=== Western Conference quarterfinals ===
==== (1) San Jose Sharks vs. (8) Colorado Avalanche ====
The San Jose Sharks entered the playoffs as the Western Conference regular season champions with 113 points. The Colorado Avalanche qualified as the eighth seed with 95 points. This was the fourth playoff meeting between these two teams with Colorado winning two of the previous three series. They last met in the 2004 Western Conference semifinals where San Jose won in six games. San Jose won this year's four-game regular season series earning five of eight points.

The Sharks eliminated the Avalanche in six games. Chris Stewart scored for the Avalanche in the final minute of game one as they took the opening game 2–1. Sharks forward Joe Pavelski tied game two in the final minute of regulation time before Devin Setoguchi scored the game-winner on the power-play 5:22 into the first overtime period; evening the series at one game each. Colorado goaltender Craig Anderson made 51 saves and Ryan O'Reilly was credited with scoring the overtime winner after San Jose defenceman Dan Boyle scored on his own goal as the Avalanche won game three 1–0. For the third consecutive time in the series overtime was required to solve game four as Joe Pavelski won the game for the Sharks with his goal 10:24 into the first overtime period. Evgeni Nabokov made 28 saves to earn a shutout as the Sharks easily won game five 5–0. After falling behind early in the third period of game six San Jose scored four unanswered goals to close out the series with a 5–2 victory.

April 14	Colorado Avalanche	2–1	San Jose Sharks	HP Pavilion	Recap
No scoring		First period	No scoring
John-Michael Liles (1) – pp – 12:38		Second period	No scoring
Chris Stewart (1) – 19:10		Third period	07:59 – Ryane Clowe (1)
Craig Anderson 25 saves / 26 shots		Goalie stats	Evgeni Nabokov 28 saves / 30 shots

April 16	Colorado Avalanche	5–6	OT	San Jose Sharks	HP Pavilion	Recap
Kyle Cumiskey (1) – 01:10		First period		19:18 – pp – Manny Malhotra (1)
Chris Stewart (2) – 00:24; Milan Hejduk (1) – 04:08; Brandon Yip (1) – 17:30		Second period		03:43 – Rob Blake (1); 07:10 – Devin Setoguchi (1); 19:45 – Scott Nichol (1)
Chris Stewart (3) – 05:34		Third period		19:28 – Joe Pavelski (1)
No scoring		First overtime period		05:22 – pp – Devin Setoguchi (2)
Craig Anderson 46 saves / 52 shots		Goalie stats		Evgeni Nabokov 17 saves / 22 shots

April 18	San Jose Sharks	0–1	OT	Colorado Avalanche	Pepsi Center	Recap
No scoring		First period		No scoring
No scoring		Second period		No scoring
No scoring		Third period		No scoring
No scoring		First overtime period		00:51 – Ryan O'Reilly (1)
Evgeni Nabokov 16 saves / 17 shots		Goalie stats		Craig Anderson 51 saves / 51 shots

April 20	San Jose Sharks	2–1	OT	Colorado Avalanche	Pepsi Center	Recap
Dan Boyle (1) – pp – 01:12		First period		No scoring
No scoring		Second period		03:27 – pp – Paul Stastny (1)
No scoring		Third period		No scoring
Joe Pavelski (2) – 10:24		First overtime period		No scoring
Evgeni Nabokov 33 saves / 34 shots		Goalie stats		Craig Anderson 43 saves / 45 shots

April 22	Colorado Avalanche	0–5	San Jose Sharks	HP Pavilion	Recap
No scoring		First period	No scoring
No scoring		Second period	08:25 – Logan Couture (1); 10:21 – pp – Joe Pavelski (3); 15:30 – Dwight Helminen (1)
No scoring		Third period	10:37 – Logan Couture (2); 13:24 – pp – Patrick Marleau (1)
Craig Anderson 29 saves / 33 shots Peter Budaj 3 saves / 4 shots		Goalie stats	Evgeni Nabokov 28 saves / 28 shots

April 24	San Jose Sharks	5–2	Colorado Avalanche	Pepsi Center	Recap
Joe Pavelski (4) – 00:47		First period	No scoring
No scoring		Second period	06:14 – Marek Svatos (1)
Dan Boyle (2) – 07:33; Joe Pavelski (5) – 09:02; Devin Setoguchi (3) – en – 19:08; Douglas Murray (1) – en – 19:29		Third period	04:51 – Brandon Yip (2)
Evgeni Nabokov 16 saves / 18 shots		Goalie stats	Craig Anderson 29 saves / 32 shots

San Jose won series 4–2

==== (2) Chicago Blackhawks vs. (7) Nashville Predators ====
The Chicago Blackhawks entered the playoffs as the second overall seed in the Western Conference after winning the Central Division title with 112 points. The Nashville Predators qualified as the seventh seed with 100 points. This was the first playoff meeting between these two teams. Chicago won four of the six games during this year's regular season series.

The Blackhawks defeated the Predators in six games. Nashville scored four times in the third period of game one to earn their franchise's first-ever road playoff victory; they had lost all of their ten previous playoff road games. Blackhawks goaltender Antti Niemi made 23 saves in a 2–0 shutout in game two, as Chicago evened the series. After trading goals in the opening period of game three, the Predators struck three times in the final 40 minutes including a penalty shot goal by Martin Erat. Antti Niemi earned his second shutout of the series in game four as Chicago took the game 3–0. The Blackhawks tied game five late in the third period on a short-handed goal by Patrick Kane and Marian Hossa ended the game 4:07 into overtime, ten seconds after he finished serving a major penalty for boarding. Chicago captain Jonathan Toews capped the scoring in the first period of game six; that saw the teams exchange seven goals. The Blackhawks held on to win the series-clinching game 5–3.

April 16	Nashville Predators	4–1	Chicago Blackhawks	United Center	Recap
No scoring		First period	No scoring
No scoring		Second period	09:43 – Patrick Kane (1)
J.P. Dumont (1) – 01:31; J.P. Dumont (2) – 10:31; Jerred Smithson (1) – en – 19:12; Martin Erat (1) – en – 19:46		Third period	No scoring
Pekka Rinne 25 saves / 26 shots		Goalie stats	Antti Niemi 22 saves / 24 shots

April 18	Nashville Predators	0–2	Chicago Blackhawks	United Center	Recap
No scoring		First period	No scoring
No scoring		Second period	08:44 – pp – Dave Bolland (1)
No scoring		Third period	04:18 – Patrick Kane (2)
Pekka Rinne 31 saves / 33 shots		Goalie stats	Antti Niemi 23 saves / 23 shots

April 20	Chicago Blackhawks	1–4	Nashville Predators	Bridgestone Arena	Recap
Tomas Kopecky (1) – pp – 17:35		First period	13:00 – Joel Ward (1)
No scoring		Second period	04:00 – David Legwand (1); 09:52 – Shea Weber (1)
No scoring		Third period	14:25 – ps – Martin Erat (2)
Antti Niemi 31 saves / 35 shots		Goalie stats	Pekka Rinne 26 saves / 27 shots

April 22	Chicago Blackhawks	3–0	Nashville Predators	Bridgestone Arena	Recap
Patrick Sharp (1) – pp – 10:57		First period	No scoring
Jonathan Toews (1) – 12:55; Patrick Sharp (2) – 16:17		Second period	No scoring
No scoring		Third period	No scoring
Antti Niemi 33 saves / 33 shots		Goalie stats	Pekka Rinne 27 saves / 30 shots

April 24	Nashville Predators	4–5	OT	Chicago Blackhawks	United Center	Recap
David Legwand (2) – 06:23		First period		09:57 – Andrew Ladd (1); 14:53 – Niklas Hjalmarsson (1)
Joel Ward (2) – sh – 17:31		Second period		16:24 – Tomas Kopecky (2)
Martin Erat (3) – 01:34; Martin Erat (4) – 11:39		Third period		19:46 – sh – Patrick Kane (3)
No scoring		First overtime period		04:07 – Marian Hossa (1)
Pekka Rinne 27 saves / 32 shots		Goalie stats		Antti Niemi 17 saves / 21 shots

April 26	Chicago Blackhawks	5–3	Nashville Predators	Bridgestone Arena	Recap
Duncan Keith (1) – 06:38; Patrick Kane (4) – 09:54; Patrick Sharp (3) – 12:03; Jonathan Toews (2) – pp – 19:29		First period	08:50 – Shea Weber (2); 15:44 – pp – Jason Arnott (1); 19:05 – Jason Arnott (2)
No scoring		Second period	No scoring
John Madden (1) – en – 19:52		Third period	No scoring
Antti Niemi 25 saves / 28 shots		Goalie stats	Pekka Rinne 27 saves / 31 shots

Chicago won series 4–2

==== (3) Vancouver Canucks vs. (6) Los Angeles Kings ====
The Vancouver Canucks entered the playoffs as the third overall seed in the Western Conference after winning the Northwest Division title with 103 points. The Los Angeles Kings qualified as the sixth seed with 101 points, earning their first playoff berth since 2002. This was the fourth playoff meeting between these two teams, with Los Angeles winning two of the three previous series. They last met in the 1993 Smythe Division finals where Los Angeles won in six games. Vancouver won three of the four games during this year's regular season series.

The Canucks eliminated the Kings in six games. Mikael Samuelsson scored twice for the Canucks in game one including the overtime winner 8:52 into the first overtime period as Vancouver took the opening game 3–2. The Kings evened the series in game two when Anze Kopitar scored the game-winning goal in the first overtime period at 7:28. Los Angeles chased Vancouver starter Roberto Luongo from game three after he allowed four goals against on sixteen shots, the Kings held on to win 5–3. Vancouver forward Henrik Sedin broke the tie in game four with 2:52 remaining in regulation time as the Canucks evened the series with a 6–4 victory. Mikael Samuelsson extended his goal scoring streak to five games as the Canucks easily won game five 7–2. Canucks goaltender Roberto Luongo made 30 saves in game six and Daniel Sedin scored the series-winner for Vancouver late in the third period of a 4–2 win.

April 15	Los Angeles Kings	2–3	OT	Vancouver Canucks	General Motors Place	Recap
No scoring		First period		No scoring
Jarret Stoll (1) – pp – 00:54; Fredrik Modin (1) – pp – 13:06		Second period		03:09 – pp – Mikael Samuelsson (1); 08:31 – Daniel Sedin (1)
No scoring		Third period		No scoring
No scoring		First overtime period		08:52 – Mikael Samuelsson (2)
Jonathan Quick 41 saves / 44 shots		Goalie stats		Roberto Luongo 25 saves / 27 shots

April 17	Los Angeles Kings	3–2	OT	Vancouver Canucks	General Motors Place	Recap
No scoring		First period		07:33 – pp – Steve Bernier (1); 09:49 – Mikael Samuelsson (3)
Fredrik Modin (2) – pp – 10:58; Wayne Simmonds (1) – 11:33		Second period		No scoring
No scoring		Third period		No scoring
Anze Kopitar (1) – pp – 07:28		First overtime period		No scoring
Jonathan Quick 24 saves / 26 shots		Goalie stats		Roberto Luongo 29 saves / 32 shots

April 19	Vancouver Canucks	3–5	Los Angeles Kings	Staples Center	Recap
Mason Raymond (1) – 02:09		First period	11:00 – pp – Drew Doughty (1)
Mikael Samuelsson (4) – 14:53		Second period	04:06 – pp – Michal Handzus (1); 12:18 – pp – Michal Handzus (2); 13:21 – Brad Richardson (1)
Daniel Sedin (2) – 04:18		Third period	09:21 – Ryan Smyth (1)
Roberto Luongo 12 saves / 16 shots Andrew Raycroft 6 saves / 7 shots		Goalie stats	Jonathan Quick 25 saves / 28 shots

April 21	Vancouver Canucks	6–4	Los Angeles Kings	Staples Center	Recap
No scoring		First period	13:26 – pp – Drew Doughty (2)
Christian Ehrhoff (1) – pp – 03:36; Pavol Demitra (1) – 15:35		Second period	05:56 – pp – Dustin Brown (1); 17:09 – Anze Kopitar (2)
Mikael Samuelsson (5) – 07:29; Sami Salo (1) – pp – 12:16; Henrik Sedin (1) – 17:08; Ryan Kesler (1) – en – 19:43		Third period	13:18 – Wayne Simmonds (2)
Roberto Luongo 22 saves / 26 shots		Goalie stats	Jonathan Quick 31 saves / 36 shots

April 23	Los Angeles Kings	2–7	Vancouver Canucks	General Motors Place	Recap
Michal Handzus (3) – pp – 14:24		First period	08:50 – Steve Bernier (2); 17:32 – Alexander Edler (1)
No scoring		Second period	08:26 – Daniel Sedin (3); 13:31 – Mikael Samuelsson (6)
Fredrik Modin (3) – 05:02		Third period	04:38 – Pavol Demitra (2); 06:31 – pp – Mikael Samuelsson (7); 09:50 – Steve Bernier (3)
Jonathan Quick 21 saves / 26 shots Erik Ersberg 2 saves / 4 shots		Goalie stats	Roberto Luongo 24 saves / 26 shots

April 25	Vancouver Canucks	4–2	Los Angeles Kings	Staples Center	Recap
No scoring		First period	10:08 – Alexander Frolov (1)
Steve Bernier (4) – pp – 08:38		Second period	15:57 – Drew Doughty (3)
Kevin Bieksa (1) – 01:57; Daniel Sedin (4) – 17:57; Alex Burrows (1) – en – 18:53		Third period	No scoring
Roberto Luongo 30 saves / 32 shots		Goalie stats	Jonathan Quick 18 saves / 21 shots

Vancouver won series 4–2

==== (4) Phoenix Coyotes vs. (5) Detroit Red Wings ====
The Phoenix Coyotes entered the playoffs as the fourth seed in the Western Conference with 107 points. The Detroit Red Wings qualified as the fifth seed with 102 points. This was the second playoff meeting between these two teams. Their only previous meeting was in the 1998 Western Conference quarterfinals where Detroit won in six games. Detroit won this year's four-game regular season series earning six of eight points.

The Red Wings defeated the Coyotes in seven games. Phoenix went three for four on the power-play in game one as they took the opening game by a final score of 3–2. Red Wings forward Henrik Zetterberg scored a hat trick in game two as Detroit evened the series with a 7–4 win. Petr Prucha scored the game-winning goal for the Coyotes in game three as Phoenix took the game with a 4–2 victory. Detroit goaltender Jimmy Howard made 29 saves to shut out the Coyotes in game four as the Red Wings tied the series with a 3–0 win. The Red Wings broke the tie in game five just past the midway mark of the third period with two goals scored 70 seconds apart and held on to win 4–1. Phoenix forced a seventh game with a dominant special teams performance in game six recording three power-play goals in the victory. After a scoreless first period in game seven, the Red Wings scored four times in the second period en route to a 6–1 win.

April 14	Detroit Red Wings	2–3	Phoenix Coyotes	Jobing.com Arena	Recap
Tomas Holmstrom (1) – 12:17; Nicklas Lidstrom (1) – pp – 16:27		First period	14:13 – pp – Keith Yandle (1)
No scoring		Second period	06:15 – pp – Wojtek Wolski (1)
No scoring		Third period	02:19 – pp – Derek Morris (1)
Jimmy Howard 32 saves / 35 shots		Goalie stats	Ilya Bryzgalov 38 saves / 40 shots

April 16	Detroit Red Wings	7–4	Phoenix Coyotes	Jobing.com Arena	Recap
No scoring		First period	10:23 – Keith Yandle (2)
Henrik Zetterberg (1) – pp – 06:27; Pavel Datsyuk (1) – 08:20; Valtteri Filppula (1) – 10:25		Second period	07:05 – Wojtek Wolski (2); 09:09 – Matthew Lombardi (1)
Justin Abdelkader (1) – 02:32; Henrik Zetterberg (2) – 13:54; Valtteri Filppula (2) – pp – 17:54; Henrik Zetterberg (3) – en – 19:12		Third period	09:24 – Shane Doan (1)
Jimmy Howard 27 saves / 31 shots		Goalie stats	Ilya Bryzgalov 32 saves / 38 shots

April 18	Phoenix Coyotes	4–2	Detroit Red Wings	Joe Louis Arena	Recap
Sami Lepisto (1) – pp – 00:29		First period	14:42 – Valtteri Filppula (3)
Wojtek Wolski (3) – 19:28		Second period	No scoring
Petr Prucha (1) – 08:16; Radim Vrbata (1) – 11:38		Third period	09:59 – Johan Franzen (1)
Ilya Bryzgalov 29 saves / 31 shots		Goalie stats	Jimmy Howard 29 saves / 33 shots

April 20	Phoenix Coyotes	0–3	Detroit Red Wings	Joe Louis Arena	Recap
No scoring		First period	No scoring
No scoring		Second period	15:33 – pp – Henrik Zetterberg (4)
No scoring		Third period	15:53 – Pavel Datsyuk (2); 16:18 – Henrik Zetterberg (5)
Ilya Bryzgalov 32 saves / 35 shots		Goalie stats	Jimmy Howard 29 saves / 29 shots

April 23	Detroit Red Wings	4–1	Phoenix Coyotes	Jobing.com Arena	Recap
Drew Miller (1) – 17:04		First period	No scoring
No scoring		Second period	09:45 – Ed Jovanovski (1)
Tomas Holmstrom (2) – 11:09; Pavel Datsyuk (3) – 12:19; Henrik Zetterberg (6) – en – 19:04		Third period	No scoring
Jimmy Howard 30 saves / 31 shots		Goalie stats	Ilya Bryzgalov 25 saves / 28 shots

April 25	Phoenix Coyotes	5–2	Detroit Red Wings	Joe Louis Arena	Recap
Lauri Korpikoski (1) – sh – 04:10		First period	No scoring
Mathieu Schneider (1) – pp – 02:27; Radim Vrbata (2) – pp – 10:09; Wojtek Wolski (4) – 14:01		Second period	02:51 – Brad Stuart (1)
Taylor Pyatt (1) – pp – 05:25		Third period	16:29 – Darren Helm (1)
Ilya Bryzgalov 31 saves / 33 shots		Goalie stats	Jimmy Howard 24 saves / 29 shots

April 27	Detroit Red Wings	6–1	Phoenix Coyotes	Jobing.com Arena	Recap
No scoring		First period	No scoring
Pavel Datsyuk (4) – pp – 02:01; Pavel Datsyuk (5) – 03:42; Nicklas Lidstrom (2) – pp – 13:52; Brad Stuart (2) – 19:55		Second period	08:23 – Vernon Fiddler (1)
Todd Bertuzzi (1) – 06:35; Nicklas Lidstrom (3) – pp – 12:14		Third period	No scoring
Jimmy Howard 32 saves / 33 shots		Goalie stats	Ilya Bryzgalov 44 saves / 50 shots

Detroit won series 4–3

== Conference semifinals ==
=== Eastern Conference semifinals ===
==== (4) Pittsburgh Penguins vs. (8) Montreal Canadiens ====
This was the second playoff meeting between these two teams, with Montreal winning the previous series. They last met in the 1998 Eastern Conference quarterfinals where Montreal won in six games. Pittsburgh won three of the four games during this year's four-game regular season series.

The Canadiens defeated the Penguins in seven games. Pittsburgh scored four times on the power-play in game one as they took the opening game 6–3. Michael Cammalleri scored twice for Montreal in game two and Jaroslav Halak made 38 saves as the Canadiens evened the series with a 3–1 win. Pittsburgh forward Evgeni Malkin's fifth goal of the playoffs broke a scoreless tie in the third period of game three as the Penguins earned a 2–0 victory; Marc-Andre Fleury made 18 saves to shut-out the Canadiens. Jaroslav Halak made 33 saves for Montreal in game four as Montreal won the game 3–2. In game five, Penguins goaltender Marc-Andre Fleury made 32 saves in a 2–1 victory. Montreal forward Maxim Lapierre scored the game-winning goal in game six as the Canadiens won their fourth consecutive elimination game of the playoffs. Montreal's Brian Gionta scored twice on the power-play in game seven as the Canadiens eliminated the defending Stanley Cup champions with a 5–2 win. Game seven was the last game ever to be played at Mellon Arena, the Penguins' home rink since the start of the franchise. Incidentally, the Canadiens were the winners of the first game played against the Penguins at Mellon Arena in 1967. The Penguins moved into the Consol Energy Center starting the next season.

April 30	Montreal Canadiens	3–6	Pittsburgh Penguins	Mellon Arena	Recap
P. K. Subban (1) – 04:30		First period	08:38 – pp – Sergei Gonchar (1); 13:27 – pp – Jordan Staal (2)
Michael Cammalleri (6) – 15:27		Second period	02:34 – pp – Kris Letang (3); 18:36 – Craig Adams (2)
Brian Gionta (3) – pp – 12:29		Third period	02:59 – pp – Alex Goligoski (2); 19:11 – en – Bill Guerin (3)
Jaroslav Halak 15 saves / 20 shots Carey Price 3 saves / 3 shots		Goalie stats	Marc-Andre Fleury 28 saves / 31 shots

May 2	Montreal Canadiens	3–1	Pittsburgh Penguins	Mellon Arena	Recap
Brian Gionta (4) – 15:48		First period	04:38 – Matt Cooke (4)
Michael Cammalleri (7) – pp – 07:29		Second period	No scoring
Michael Cammalleri (8) – 17:06		Third period	No scoring
Jaroslav Halak 38 saves / 39 shots		Goalie stats	Marc-Andre Fleury 18 saves / 21 shots

May 4	Pittsburgh Penguins	2–0	Montreal Canadiens	Bell Centre	Recap
No scoring		First period	No scoring
No scoring		Second period	No scoring
Evgeni Malkin (5) – pp – 01:16; Pascal Dupuis (2) – en – 19:45		Third period	No scoring
Marc-Andre Fleury 18 saves / 18 shots		Goalie stats	Jaroslav Halak 23 saves / 24 shots

May 6	Pittsburgh Penguins	2–3	Montreal Canadiens	Bell Centre	Recap
Maxime Talbot (2) – 03:27; Chris Kunitz (3) – pp – 05:18		First period	02:34 – Tom Pyatt (1)
No scoring		Second period	No scoring
No scoring		Third period	02:07 – Maxim Lapierre (2); 03:40 – Brian Gionta (5)
Marc-Andre Fleury 22 saves / 25 shots		Goalie stats	Jaroslav Halak 33 saves / 35 shots

May 8	Montreal Canadiens	1–2	Pittsburgh Penguins	Mellon Arena	Recap
No scoring		First period	18:18 – pp – Kris Letang (4)
No scoring		Second period	09:50 – Sergei Gonchar (2)
Michael Cammalleri (9) – pp – 19:29		Third period	No scoring
Jaroslav Halak 23 saves / 25 shots		Goalie stats	Marc-Andre Fleury 32 saves / 33 shots

May 10	Pittsburgh Penguins	3–4	Montreal Canadiens	Bell Centre	Recap
Sidney Crosby (6) – 07:22		First period	01:13 – Michael Cammalleri (10)
Kris Letang (5) – pp – 05:21		Second period	10:45 – Michael Cammalleri (11); 13:15 – Jaroslav Spacek (1)
Bill Guerin (4) – 18:36		Third period	11:03 – Maxim Lapierre (3)
Marc-Andre Fleury 21 saves / 25 shots		Goalie stats	Jaroslav Halak 34 saves / 37 shots

May 12	Montreal Canadiens	5–2	Pittsburgh Penguins	Mellon Arena	Recap
Brian Gionta (6) – pp – 00:32; Dominic Moore (3) – 14:23		First period	No scoring
Michael Cammalleri (12) – 03:32; Travis Moen (2) – sh – 05:14		Second period	08:36 – Chris Kunitz (4); 16:30 – Jordan Staal (3)
Brian Gionta (7) – pp – 10:00		Third period	No scoring
Jaroslav Halak 37 saves / 39 shots		Goalie stats	Marc-Andre Fleury 9 saves / 13 shots Brent Johnson 6 saves / 7 shots

Montreal won series 4–3

==== (6) Boston Bruins vs. (7) Philadelphia Flyers ====
This was the fifth playoff meeting between these two teams, with the teams splitting the four previous series. They last met in the 1978 Stanley Cup Semifinals where Boston won in five games. The teams split this year's four-game regular season series, including a 2–1 overtime win by Boston at the 2010 NHL Winter Classic at Fenway Park on New Year's Day.

Philadelphia became the third NHL team to come back from a 3–0 deficit to win a series, joining the 1942 Toronto Maple Leafs and the 1975 New York Islanders as the only teams to accomplish this feat (the 2014 Los Angeles Kings became the fourth team to do this in 2014). Bruins forward Marc Savard ended game one with his goal 13:52 into the first overtime period, giving Boston a 5–4 victory. Milan Lucic broke the tie late in the third period of game two to give the Bruins a 3–2 win. Boston goaltender Tuukka Rask made 34 saves in a 4–1 Bruins win during game three. Ultimately, the turning point in the series occurred five minutes into game three when Philadelphia Flyers captain Mike Richards laid a clean open-ice hit onto Bruins forward David Krejci. Krejci did not return to the lineup for the rest of the series after being injured with a broken wrist as a result of the hit. In game four, Philadelphia Flyers Forward Simon Gagne returned to the lineup after injuring his big toe in Game 4 of the first round series against New Jersey Devils. Bruins forward Mark Recchi tied the game in the final minute of the third period, however the Bruins came up short in overtime as Simon Gagne extended the series with a goal 14:40 into the first overtime period in a 5–4 Flyers victory. Brian Boucher and Michael Leighton made 23 saves in a 4–0 split shutout for the Flyers in game five; Boucher was injured in the second period and did not return to the game. The Flyers forced a seventh game with a 2–1 victory in game six. In game seven, Philadelphia came back from a 3–0 goal deficit to win by a score of 4–3.

May 1	Philadelphia Flyers	4–5	OT	Boston Bruins	TD Garden	Recap
No scoring		First period		02:39 – Steve Begin (1); 12:54 – Patrice Bergeron (3)
Ryan Parent (1) – 07:38; Chris Pronger (3) – pp – 15:48		Second period		11:43 – pp – Miroslav Satan (3)
Mike Richards (3) – pp – 12:37; Daniel Briere (3) – 16:38		Third period		07:25 – David Krejci (4)
No scoring		First overtime period		13:52 – Marc Savard (1)
Brian Boucher 41 saves / 46 shots		Goalie stats		Tuukka Rask 32 saves / 36 shots

May 3	Philadelphia Flyers	2–3	Boston Bruins	TD Garden	Recap
Mike Richards (4) – 17:06		First period	05:12 – Johnny Boychuk (2)
Daniel Briere (4) – 19:35		Second period	09:31 – Miroslav Satan (4)
No scoring		Third period	17:03 – Milan Lucic (1)
Brian Boucher 24 saves / 27 shots		Goalie stats	Tuukka Rask 24 saves / 26 shots

May 5	Boston Bruins	4–1	Philadelphia Flyers	Wachovia Center	Recap
Blake Wheeler (1) – 04:11; Miroslav Satan (5) – 05:45		First period	02:32 – Arron Asham (2)
No scoring		Second period	No scoring
Mark Recchi (4) – pp – 02:30; Patrice Bergeron (4) – en – 18:08		Third period	No scoring
Tuukka Rask 34 saves / 35 shots		Goalie stats	Brian Boucher 16 saves / 19 shots Johan Backlund 0 saves / 0 shots

May 7	Boston Bruins	4–5	OT	Philadelphia Flyers	Wachovia Center	Recap
Mark Recchi (5) – 15:37		First period		19:06 – Daniel Briere (5)
Michael Ryder (3) – 10:56		Second period		04:28 – Chris Pronger (4); 08:35 – Claude Giroux (5)
Milan Lucic (2) – pp – 03:49; Mark Recchi (6) – 19:28		Third period		14:20 – Ville Leino (1)
No scoring		First overtime period		14:40 – Simon Gagne (1)
Tuukka Rask 29 saves / 34 shots		Goalie stats		Brian Boucher 33 saves / 37 shots

May 10	Philadelphia Flyers	4–0	Boston Bruins	TD Garden	Recap
Ville Leino (2) – 06:41		First period	No scoring
Scott Hartnell (1) – 11:16; Simon Gagne (2) – pp – 17:53		Second period	No scoring
Simon Gagne (3) – 06:48		Third period	No scoring
Brian Boucher 9 saves / 9 shots Michael Leighton 14 saves / 14 shots		Goalie stats	Tuukka Rask 27 saves / 31 shots

May 12	Boston Bruins	1–2	Philadelphia Flyers	Wachovia Center	Recap
No scoring		First period	06:58 – Mike Richards (5)
No scoring		Second period	16:20 – pp – Daniel Briere (6)
Milan Lucic (3) – 19:00		Third period	No scoring
Tuukka Rask 25 saves / 27 shots		Goalie stats	Michael Leighton 30 saves / 31 shots

May 14	Philadelphia Flyers	4–3	Boston Bruins	TD Garden	Recap
James van Riemsdyk (1) – 17:12		First period	05:27 – pp – Michael Ryder (4); 09:02 – pp – Milan Lucic (4); 14:10 – Milan Lucic (5)
Scott Hartnell (2) – 02:49; Daniel Briere (7) – 08:39		Second period	No scoring
Simon Gagne (4) – pp – 12:52		Third period	No scoring
Michael Leighton 22 saves / 25 shots		Goalie stats	Tuukka Rask 23 saves / 27 shots

Philadelphia won series 4–3

=== Western Conference semifinals ===
==== (1) San Jose Sharks vs. (5) Detroit Red Wings ====
This was the fourth playoff meeting between these two teams, with Detroit winning two of the three previous series. They last met in the 2007 Western Conference semifinals where Detroit won in six games. Detroit won three of the four games during this year's regular season series.

The Sharks eliminated the Red Wings in five games. San Jose scored three times in less than 90 seconds in the first period of game one, as they held on late to a 4–3 victory. After trading goals in the first period of game two, Detroit took the lead in the second period before San Jose came back in the third period, getting the game-winning goal from Joe Thornton at 12:37. The Sharks forced overtime in game three after coming back from a two-goal deficit in the third period, Patrick Marleau scored the overtime-winner for San Jose at 7:07 of the first overtime period. Detroit forward Johan Franzen scored a natural hat trick in the first period of game four and he scored again in the third period to cap off a four-goal, six point night as the Red Wings extended the series with a 7–1 victory. No other player scored four times in a playoff game again until Jean-Gabriel Pageau scored four goals for the Ottawa Senators in a 6–5 overtime victory in game two of the 2017 Eastern Conference Second Round series against the New York Rangers. San Jose goaltender Evgeni Nabokov made 33 saves in the series-clinching win during game five.

April 29	Detroit Red Wings	3–4	San Jose Sharks	HP Pavilion	Recap
Daniel Cleary (1) – 11:40		First period	09:05 – pp – Joe Pavelski (5); 10:01 – Dany Heatley (1); 10:24 – Devin Setoguchi (4)
Johan Franzen (2) – 04:45		Second period	No scoring
Brian Rafalski (1) – 02:57		Third period	00:50 – pp – Joe Pavelski (6)
Jimmy Howard 23 saves / 27 shots		Goalie stats	Evgeni Nabokov 20 saves / 23 shots

May 2	Detroit Red Wings	3–4	San Jose Sharks	HP Pavilion	Recap
Pavel Datsyuk (6) – 06:51; Tomas Holmstrom (3) – pp – 13:17		First period	09:01 – pp – Joe Pavelski (8); 10:32 – Ryane Clowe (2)
Nicklas Lidstrom (4) – 02:00		Second period	No scoring
No scoring		Third period	04:40 – pp – Joe Pavelski (9); 12:37 – Joe Thornton (1)
Jimmy Howard 41 saves / 45 shots		Goalie stats	Evgeni Nabokov 28 saves / 31 shots

May 4	San Jose Sharks	4–3	OT	Detroit Red Wings	Joe Louis Arena	Recap
Devin Setoguchi (5) – 19:56		First period		13:33 – Tomas Holmstrom (4); 18:37 – Daniel Cleary (2)
No scoring		Second period		01:42 – Henrik Zetterberg (7)
Joe Thornton (2) – 06:42; Logan Couture (3) – 13:17		Third period		No scoring
Patrick Marleau (2) – 07:07		First overtime period		No scoring
Evgeni Nabokov 32 saves / 35 shots		Goalie stats		Jimmy Howard 29 saves / 33 shots

May 6	San Jose Sharks	1–7	Detroit Red Wings	Joe Louis Arena	Recap
No scoring		First period	05:40 – pp – Todd Bertuzzi (2); 07:50 – Johan Franzen (3); 10:43 – Johan Franzen (4); 11:16 – Johan Franzen (5); 18:50 – Valtteri Filppula (4)
Dany Heatley (2) – pp – 19:11		Second period	03:05 – pp – Brian Rafalski (2)
No scoring		Third period	07:33 – pp – Johan Franzen (6)
Evgeni Nabokov 4 saves / 9 shots Thomas Greiss 26 saves / 28 shots		Goalie stats	Jimmy Howard 28 saves / 29 shots

May 8	Detroit Red Wings	1–2	San Jose Sharks	HP Pavilion	Recap
No scoring		First period	No scoring
Brian Rafalski (3) – 02:40		Second period	04:54 – pp – Joe Thornton (3)
No scoring		Third period	06:59 – Patrick Marleau (3)
Jimmy Howard 30 saves / 32 shots		Goalie stats	Evgeni Nabokov 33 saves / 34 shots

San Jose won series 4–1

==== (2) Chicago Blackhawks vs. (3) Vancouver Canucks ====
This was the fourth playoff meeting between these two teams, with Chicago winning two of the three previous series. They last met in the previous year's Western Conference semifinals where Chicago won in six games. The teams split this year's four-game regular season series.

The Blackhawks defeated the Canucks in six games for the second consecutive year in the second round. Five different Vancouver players scored in game one and Roberto Luongo made 36 saves in the opening game victory. Kris Versteeg's first goal of the playoffs broke the tie in game two with 1:30 remaining in regulation time as the Blackhawks evened the series with a 4–2 win. Chicago forward Dustin Byfuglien scored a hat trick in game three as the Blackhawks won 5–2. In game four Blackhawks captain Jonathan Toews recorded a hat trick of his own (scoring all three goals on the power-play) as Chicago broke the game open in the second period and won by a final score of 7–4. Kevin Bieksa scored twice for the Canucks in game five as Vancouver avoided elimination with a 4–1 victory. After a scoreless opening period in game six the Blackhawks struck three times in the second period and held on to win the game 5–1, earning their second consecutive trip to the Western Conference Final.

May 1	Vancouver Canucks	5–1	Chicago Blackhawks	United Center	Recap
Christian Ehrhoff (2) – 13:51; Mason Raymond (2) – 19:49		First period	No scoring
Henrik Sedin (2) – 00:32; Kyle Wellwood (1) – pp – 10:59; Michael Grabner (1) – 16:21		Second period	No scoring
No scoring		Third period	02:07 – pp – Patrick Kane (5)
Roberto Luongo 36 saves / 37 shots		Goalie stats	Antti Niemi 20 saves / 25 shots Cristobal Huet 3 saves / 3 shots

May 3	Vancouver Canucks	2–4	Chicago Blackhawks	United Center	Recap
Mason Raymond (3) – 01:22; Mikael Samuelsson (8) – pp – 05:02		First period	07:40 – Brent Seabrook (1)
No scoring		Second period	No scoring
No scoring		Third period	06:49 – sh – Patrick Sharp (4); 18:30 – Kris Versteeg (1); 19:12 – en – Patrick Kane (6)
Roberto Luongo 30 saves / 33 shots		Goalie stats	Antti Niemi 24 saves / 26 shots

May 5	Chicago Blackhawks	5–2	Vancouver Canucks	General Motors Place	Recap
Kris Versteeg (2) – 05:19; Dustin Byfuglien (1) – pp – 16:47		First period	No scoring
Dustin Byfuglien (2) – pp – 11:24		Second period	09:07 – Jannik Hansen (1); 19:06 – Alexandre Burrows (2)
Marian Hossa (2) – 07:45; Dustin Byfuglien (3) – 13:58		Third period	No scoring
Antti Niemi 31 saves / 33 shots		Goalie stats	Roberto Luongo 30 saves / 35 shots

May 7	Chicago Blackhawks	7–4	Vancouver Canucks	General Motors Place	Recap
Brent Seabrook (2) – 00:18; Jonathan Toews (3) – pp – 09:23		First period	01:34 – Kyle Wellwood (2); 14:36 – pp — Daniel Sedin (5)
Jonathan Toews (4) – pp – 00:27; Patrick Sharp (5) – pp – 12:47; Jonathan Toews (5) – pp – 15:22		Second period	18:16 – pp – Alexander Edler (2)
Tomas Kopecky (3) – 06:59; Dave Bolland (2) – en – 19:23		Third period	14:37 – Henrik Sedin (3)
Antti Niemi 26 saves / 30 shots		Goalie stats	Roberto Luongo 27 saves / 33 shots

May 9	Vancouver Canucks	4–1	Chicago Blackhawks	United Center	Recap
Christian Ehrhoff (3) – 00:59; Kevin Bieksa (2) – 14:24		First period	No scoring
Kevin Bieksa (3) – pp – 13:00		Second period	No scoring
Alex Burrows (3) – en – 19:15		Third period	12:51 – Jonathan Toews (6)
Roberto Luongo 29 saves / 30 shots		Goalie stats	Antti Niemi 20 saves / 23 shots

May 11	Chicago Blackhawks	5–1	Vancouver Canucks	General Motors Place	Recap
No scoring		First period	No scoring
Troy Brouwer (1) – 02:00; Kris Versteeg (3) – 02:36; Dave Bolland (3) – sh – 19:15		Second period	No scoring
Patrick Kane (7) – 08:17; Dustin Byfuglien (4) – 08:42		Third period	03:44 – Shane O'Brien (1)
Antti Niemi 29 saves / 30 shots		Goalie stats	Roberto Luongo 30 saves / 35 shots

Chicago won series 4–2

== Conference finals ==
=== Eastern Conference final ===
==== (7) Philadelphia Flyers vs. (8) Montreal Canadiens ====
This was the sixth playoff meeting between these two teams with Montreal winning three of the five previous series. They last met in the 2008 Eastern Conference semifinals, which Philadelphia won in five games. This was Philadelphia's tenth semifinal/conference final appearance since the league began using a 16-team or greater playoff format in 1980, having last went to the conference finals in 2008, which they lost to the Pittsburgh Penguins in five games. This was Montreal's sixth Conference Finals appearance. They last went to the conference finals in 1993; which they won in five games over the New York Islanders. The teams split this year's four-game regular season series. Since adopting a conference-based playoff seeding format in the 1993–94 NHL season this was the first Conference Final contested by the seventh and eighth seeds.

The Flyers defeated the Canadiens in five games. Michael Leighton made 28 saves in game one to earn a shutout as Philadelphia took the opener 6–0. The Flyers scored twice on the power-play in game two and Leighton shutout the Canadiens again in a 3–0 win. After being shutout in the first two games of the series Montreal scored five times in game three to earn a victory. In game four, Michael Leighton earned his third shutout of the series as the Flyers took a 3–1 series lead with another 3–0 win. Flyers forward Jeff Carter scored the series-winning goal in the second period of game five and added an empty net goal in the third period to seal the game as Philadelphia advanced to the Stanley Cup Final for the first time since 1997.

May 16	Montreal Canadiens	0–6	Philadelphia Flyers	Wachovia Center	Recap
No scoring		First period	03:55 – pp – Braydon Coburn (1)
No scoring		Second period	00:30 – James van Riemsdyk (2); 04:23 – Daniel Briere (8); 09:53 – pp – Simon Gagne (5)
No scoring		Third period	12:13 – Scott Hartnell (3); 13:26 – Claude Giroux (6)
Jaroslav Halak 10 saves / 14 shots Carey Price 9 saves / 11 shots		Goalie stats	Michael Leighton 28 saves / 28 shots

May 18	Montreal Canadiens	0–3	Philadelphia Flyers	Wachovia Center	Recap
No scoring		First period	04:16 – pp – Daniel Briere (9)
No scoring		Second period	15:49 – pp – Simon Gagne (6)
No scoring		Third period	10:24 – Ville Leino (3)
Jaroslav Halak 20 saves / 23 shots		Goalie stats	Michael Leighton 30 saves / 30 shots

May 20	Philadelphia Flyers	1–5	Montreal Canadiens	Bell Centre	Recap
No scoring		First period	07:05 – Michael Cammalleri (13); 16:52 – Tom Pyatt (2)
Simon Gagne (7) – 08:22		Second period	No scoring
No scoring		Third period	02:00 – Brian Gionta (8); 11:33 – Dominic Moore (4); 19:29 – pp – Marc-Andre Bergeron (2)
Michael Leighton 33 saves / 38 shots		Goalie stats	Jaroslav Halak 25 saves / 26 shots

May 22	Philadelphia Flyers	3–0	Montreal Canadiens	Bell Centre	Recap
No scoring		First period	No scoring
Claude Giroux (7) – 05:41; Ville Leino (4) – 14:53		Second period	No scoring
Claude Giroux (8) – en – 18:47		Third period	No scoring
Michael Leighton 17 saves / 17 shots		Goalie stats	Jaroslav Halak 22 saves / 24 shots

May 24	Montreal Canadiens	2–4	Philadelphia Flyers	Wachovia Center	Recap
Brian Gionta (9) – 00:59		First period	04:25 – sh – Mike Richards (6)
No scoring		Second period	03:07 – Arron Asham (3); 04:31 – Jeff Carter (3)
Scott Gomez (2) – 06:53		Third period	19:37 – en – Jeff Carter (4)
Jaroslav Halak 22 saves / 25 shots		Goalie stats	Michael Leighton 25 saves / 27 shots

Philadelphia won series 4–1

=== Western Conference final ===
==== (1) San Jose Sharks vs. (2) Chicago Blackhawks ====
This was the first playoff meeting between these two teams. This was San Jose's second appearance in the conference finals. They last went to the conference finals in 2004, which they lost to the Calgary Flames in six games. This was Chicago's ninth Conference finals appearance. They last went to the conference finals in the previous year; which they lost in five games to the Detroit Red Wings. Chicago won three of the four games during this year's regular season series.

The Blackhawks swept the Sharks in four games. Blackhawks goaltender Antti Niemi made 44 saves in game one as Chicago took the opening game 2–1. Chicago had a three-goal lead halfway through the second period of game two and held on to win the game by a final score of 4–2. The Sharks came back to tie the game in the third period of game three thanks to Patrick Marleau’s second goal of the game, however San Jose came up short in overtime as Dustin Byfuglien ended the game at 12:24 of the first overtime period, giving Chicago a 3–0 series lead. Chicago trailed by two goals near the halfway mark of the second period before scoring four unanswered goals to complete the sweep in game four and they advanced to the Stanley Cup Final for the first time in eighteen years.

May 16	Chicago Blackhawks	2–1	San Jose Sharks	HP Pavilion	Recap
No scoring		First period	11:19 – pp – Jason Demers (1)
Patrick Sharp (6) – 07:44		Second period	No scoring
Dustin Byfuglien (5) – 13:15		Third period	No scoring
Antti Niemi 44 saves / 45 shots		Goalie stats	Evgeni Nabokov 38 saves / 40 shots

May 18	Chicago Blackhawks	4–2	San Jose Sharks	HP Pavilion	Recap
Andrew Ladd (2) – 12:48		First period	No scoring
Dustin Byfuglien (6) – 06:59; Jonathan Toews (7) – pp – 08:29		Second period	11:08 – pp – Patrick Marleau (4)
Troy Brouwer (2) – 06:18		Third period	15:32 – Patrick Marleau (5)
Antti Niemi 20 saves / 22 shots		Goalie stats	Evgeni Nabokov 23 saves / 27 shots

May 21	San Jose Sharks	2–3	OT	Chicago Blackhawks	United Center	Recap
No scoring		First period		No scoring
Patrick Marleau (6) – pp – 03:58		Second period		06:59 – pp – Patrick Sharp (7)
Patrick Marleau (7) – 15:37		Third period		13:05 – Dave Bolland (4)
No scoring		First overtime period		12:24 – Dustin Byfuglien (7)
Evgeni Nabokov 35 saves / 38 shots		Goalie stats		Antti Niemi 44 saves / 46 shots

May 23	San Jose Sharks	2–4	Chicago Blackhawks	United Center	Recap
Logan Couture (4) – 11:08		First period	No scoring
Patrick Marleau (8) – sh – 07:35		Second period	13:15 – Brent Seabrook (3); 18:38 – Dave Bolland (5)
No scoring		Third period	14:05 – pp – Dustin Byfuglien (8); 19:18 – en – Kris Versteeg (4)
Evgeni Nabokov 23 saves / 26 shots		Goalie stats	Antti Niemi 16 saves / 18 shots

Chicago won series 4–0

== Stanley Cup Final ==
This was the second playoff series between these two teams and the first since 1971 when the Blackhawks swept the Flyers in four games in the Stanley Cup quarterfinals. Philadelphia won the only meeting between these teams in the regular season. Prior to the 2010 Finals, both teams had previously lost in their last five consecutive Finals appearances (Chicago in 1962, 1965, 1971, 1973, and 1992; and Philadelphia in 1976, 1980, 1985, 1987, and 1997). Having lost in the 2010 Finals, the Flyers became the third team in NHL history to lose in six consecutive Finals appearances, after the Toronto Maple Leafs and the Detroit Red Wings. It also was the first time since the Flyers themselves lost in 1987 that a team in the city of Philadelphia lost a championship in a non-presidential inauguration year (Phillies in 1993 and 2009 World Series, Eagles in Super Bowl XXXIX in 2005, Flyers in 1997, and 76ers in 2001 NBA Finals). This was the first Stanley Cup won in overtime since the New Jersey Devils in 2000.

May 29	Philadelphia Flyers	5–6	Chicago Blackhawks	United Center	Recap
Ville Leino (5) – 06:38; Scott Hartnell (4) – pp – 16:37; Daniel Briere (10) – 19:33		First period	07:46 – Troy Brouwer (3); 11:50 – sh – Dave Bolland (6)
Blair Betts (1) – 07:20; Arron Asham (4) – 18:49		Second period	01:11 – Patrick Sharp (8); 09:31 – Kris Versteeg (5); 15:18 – Troy Brouwer (4)
No scoring		Third period	08:25 – Tomas Kopecky (4)
Michael Leighton 15 saves / 20 shots Brian Boucher 11 saves / 12 shots		Goalie stats	Antti Niemi 27 saves / 32 shots

May 31	Philadelphia Flyers	1–2	Chicago Blackhawks	United Center	Recap
No scoring		First period	No scoring
No scoring		Second period	17:09 – Marian Hossa (3); 17:37 – Ben Eager (1)
Simon Gagne (8) – pp – 05:20		Third period	No scoring
Michael Leighton 24 saves / 26 shots		Goalie stats	Antti Niemi 32 saves / 33 shots

June 2	Chicago Blackhawks	3–4	OT	Philadelphia Flyers	Wachovia Center	Recap
No scoring		First period		14:58 – pp – Daniel Briere (11)
Duncan Keith (2) – 02:49; Brent Sopel (1) – 17:52		Second period		09:55 – pp – Scott Hartnell (5)
Patrick Kane (8) – 02:50		Third period		03:10 – Ville Leino (6)
No scoring		First overtime period		05:59 – Claude Giroux (9)
Antti Niemi 28 saves / 32 shots		Goalie stats		Michael Leighton 24 saves / 27 shots

June 4	Chicago Blackhawks	3–5	Philadelphia Flyers	Wachovia Center	Recap
Patrick Sharp (9) – 18:32		First period	04:35 – pp – Mike Richards (7); 14:48 – Matt Carle (1); 19:23 – Claude Giroux (10)
No scoring		Second period	No scoring
Dave Bolland (7) – pp – 12:01; Brian Campbell (1) – 15:50		Third period	06:43 – Ville Leino (7); 19:35 – en – Jeff Carter (5)
Antti Niemi 26 saves / 30 shots		Goalie stats	Michael Leighton 31 saves / 34 shots

June 6	Philadelphia Flyers	4–7	Chicago Blackhawks	United Center	Recap
No scoring		First period	12:17 – pp – Brent Seabrook (4); 15:26 – Dave Bolland (8); 18:15 – Kris Versteeg (6)
Scott Hartnell (6) – 00:32; Kimmo Timonen (1) – 04:38		Second period	03:13 – Patrick Kane (9); 15:45 – pp – Dustin Byfuglien (9)
James van Riemsdyk (3) – 06:36; Simon Gagne (9) – 17:24		Third period	16:08 – Patrick Sharp (10); 17:55 – en – Dustin Byfuglien (10)
Michael Leighton 10 saves / 13 shots Brian Boucher 11 saves / 14 shots		Goalie stats	Antti Niemi 23 saves / 27 shots

June 9	Chicago Blackhawks	4–3	OT	Philadelphia Flyers	Wachovia Center	Recap
Dustin Byfuglien (11) – pp – 16:49		First period		19:33 – pp – Scott Hartnell (7)
Patrick Sharp (11) – 09:58; Andrew Ladd (3) – 17:43		Second period		08:00 – Daniel Briere (12)
No scoring		Third period		16:01 – Scott Hartnell (8)
Patrick Kane (10) – 04:06		First overtime period		No scoring
Antti Niemi 21 saves / 24 shots		Goalie stats		Michael Leighton 37 saves / 41 shots

Chicago won series 4–2

== Player statistics ==
=== Skaters ===
These are the top ten skaters based on points. If the list exceeds ten skaters because of a tie in points, goals take precedence.

Player	Team	GP	G	A	Pts	+/–
Daniel Briere	Philadelphia Flyers	23	12	18	30	+9
Jonathan Toews	Chicago Blackhawks	22	7	22	29	-1
Patrick Kane	Chicago Blackhawks	22	10	18	28	-2
Mike Richards	Philadelphia Flyers	23	7	16	23	-1
Patrick Sharp	Chicago Blackhawks	22	11	11	22	+10
Claude Giroux	Philadelphia Flyers	23	10	11	21	+7
Ville Leino	Philadelphia Flyers	19	7	14	21	+10
Michael Cammalleri	Montreal Canadiens	19	13	6	19	-6
Sidney Crosby	Pittsburgh Penguins	13	6	13	19	+6
Johan Franzen	Detroit Red Wings	12	6	12	18	+8

GP = Games played; G = Goals; A = Assists; Pts = Points; +/– = Plus/minus

=== Goaltending ===
This is a combined table of the top five goaltenders based on goals against average and the top five goaltenders based on save percentage with at least 420 minutes played. The table is sorted by GAA, and the criteria for inclusion are bolded.

Player	Team	GP	W	L	SA	GA	GAA	SV%	SO	TOI
Michael Leighton	Philadelphia Flyers	13	8	3	371	31	**2.46**	**.916**	3	757:13
Brian Boucher	Philadelphia Flyers	12	6	6	298	27	**2.47**	.909	1	655:37
Jaroslav Halak	Montreal Canadiens	18	9	9	562	43	**2.55**	**.923**	0	1,013:24
Evgeni Nabokov	San Jose Sharks	15	8	7	407	38	**2.56**	.907	1	889:51
Tuukka Rask	Boston Bruins	13	7	6	409	36	**2.61**	**.912**	0	829:03
Antti Niemi	Chicago Blackhawks	22	16	6	645	58	2.63	**.910**	2	1,321:51
Jimmy Howard	Detroit Red Wings	12	5	7	387	33	2.75	**.915**	1	720:26

GP = Games played; W = Wins; L = Losses; SA = Shots against; GA = Goals against; GAA = Goals against average; SV% = Save percentage; SO = Shutouts; TOI = Time on ice (minutes:seconds)

== Television ==
National Canadian English-language coverage of the first three rounds of the playoffs were split between CBC and TSN. This was the second year of a six-year agreement in which CBC and TSN selected the rights to individual series in the first three rounds using a draft-like setup. CBC held exclusive rights to the Stanley Cup Final. French-language telecasts were broadcast on RDS and RDS2.

In the United States, national coverage was split between NBC and Versus. During the first and second round, excluding games exclusively broadcast on NBC, the regional rights holders of each participating U.S. team produced local telecasts of their respective games. Not all first and second-round games were nationally televised, while the conference finals were exclusively broadcast on either NBC or Versus. NBC then aired the first two and final two games of the Stanley Cup Final, while Versus broadcast games three and four.

Preceded by 2009 Stanley Cup playoffs	Stanley Cup playoffs 2010	Succeeded by 2011 Stanley Cup playoffs
