= Jani Hurme =

Finnish ice hockey player (born 1975)

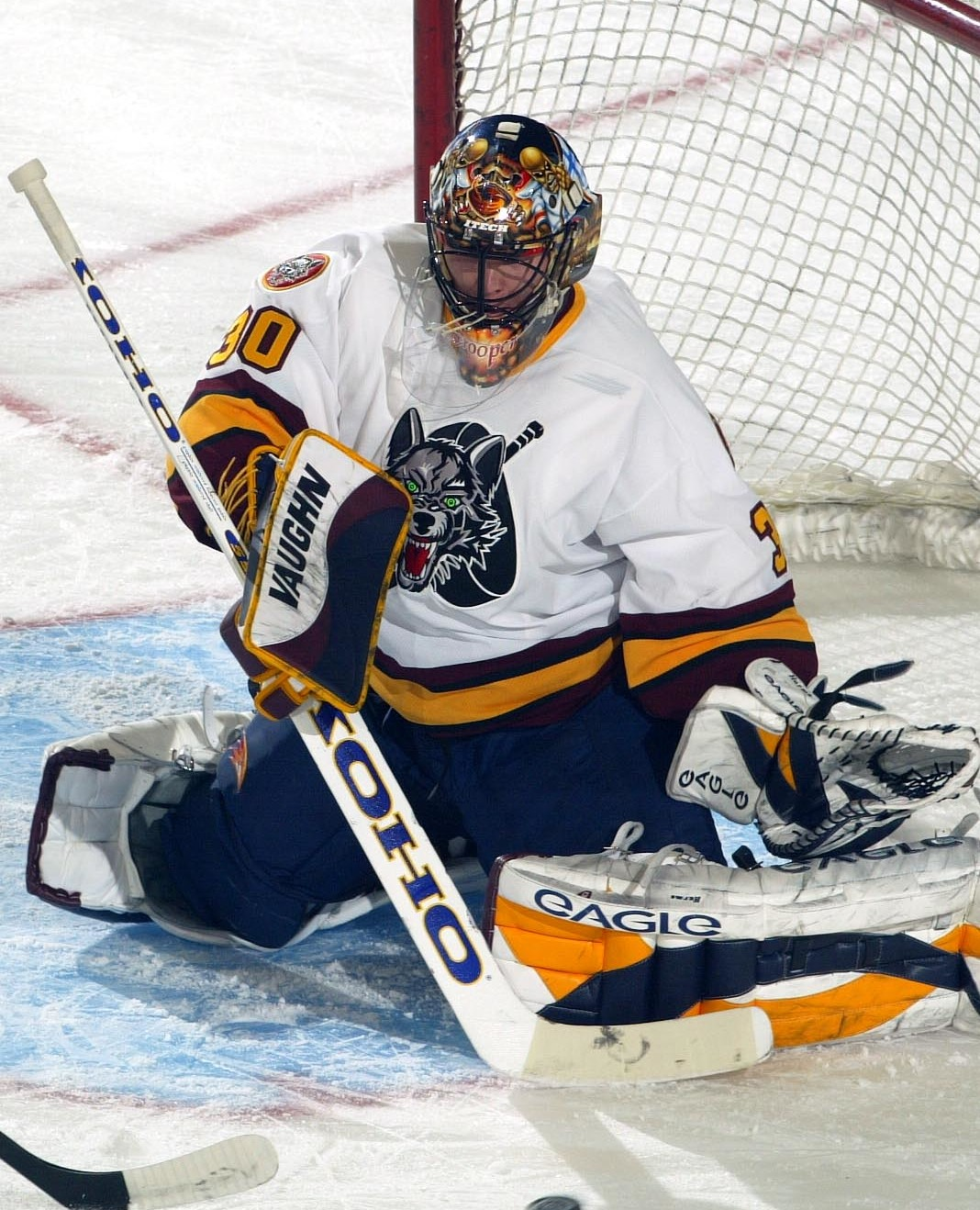
- Hurme with the Chicago Wolves in 2005
- Born: 7 January 1975 (age 51) Turku, Finland
- Height: 6 ft 0 in (183 cm)
- Weight: 187 lb (85 kg; 13 st 5 lb)
- Position: Goaltender
- Caught: Left
- Played for: Ottawa Senators; Florida Panthers; TPS; Ilves
- National team: Finland
- NHL draft: 58th overall, 1997; Ottawa Senators
- Playing career: 1993–2011

Jani Petteri Hurme (born 7 January 1975) is a Finnish former professional ice hockey goaltender. He played 76 games in the National Hockey League (NHL) with the Ottawa Senators and Florida Panthers between 2000 and 2003. He also played several seasons in the Finnish SM-liiga during his career, which lasted from 1993 to 2011. He was drafted by the Ottawa Senators in the third round of the 1997 NHL entry draft with the 58th overall pick. Internationally Hurme played for the Finnish national team at the 2002 Winter Olympics and the 2003 World Championship.

== Playing career ==
After playing three seasons for TPS in Finland's SM-liiga, Hurme made his North American debut in the International Hockey League with the Indianapolis Ice during the 1997–98 season. He played 48 games with the Senators over three seasons before being traded to the Florida Panthers. He appeared in another 28 games with the Panthers during the 2002–03 season.

Hurme was traded to the Atlanta Thrashers, but due to a very serious illness, he did not play a single game in Atlanta. Suffering from the crippling effects of hospital infections, Hurme needed over two years to recuperate.

Eventually Hurme returned to the ice, and in the 2005–06 season he played with the Columbia Inferno of the ECHL and Chicago Wolves of the AHL before joining the Portland Pirates, for whom he started sixteen playoff games.

For the 2006–07 season, Hurme returned to Finland and played again for TPS. He played for Malmö Redhawks from 2007 to 2009. He returned to Finland to play for Ilves in December 2009.

He spent his off-seasons in Turku, Finland, where he owns a house in the neighbourhood of Hirvensalo.

Hurme was on the Finnish squad at the 2002 Winter Olympics.

== Career statistics ==
=== Regular season and playoffs ===
			Regular season										Playoffs
Season	Team	League	GP	W	L	T	OTL	MIN	GA	SO	GAA	SV%	GP	W	L	MIN	GA	SO	GAA	SV%
1992–93	TPS U20	FIN U20	12	7	4	0	—	669	47	0	4.21	.881	1	—	—	60	11	0	11	.725
1993–94	Kiekko-67 U20	FIN U20	18	—	—	—	—	1082	57	0	3.16	—	—	—	—	—	—	—	—	—
1993–94	Kiekko-67	FIN-2	3	—	—	—	—	190	7	0	2.21	.914	—	—	—	—	—	—	—	—
1993–94	TPS	FIN	1	0	0	0	—	2	0	0	0.00	1.000	—	—	—	—	—	—	—	—
1994–95	TPS U20	FIN U20	2	1	0	1	—	125	5	0	2.40	.938	—	—	—	—	—	—	—	—
1994–95	Kiekko-67 U20	FIN U20	9	2	7	0	—	539	47	0	5.23	.895	—	—	—	—	—	—	—	—
1994–95	Kiekko-67	FIN-2	19	—	—	—	—	1049	53	—	3.03	.901	7	4	3	411	20	0	2.92	—
1995–96	TPS U20	FIN U20	13	8	5	0	—	777	34	1	2.63	.924	—	—	—	—	—	—	—	—
1995–96	Kiekko-67	FIN-2	16	11	3	2	—	968	39	1	2.42	.918	—	—	—	—	—	—	—	—
1995–96	TPS	FIN	16	14	1	1	—	945	34	2	2.16	.927	10	7	3	545	22	2	2.42	.924
1996–97	TPS	FIN	48	31	11	6	—	2917	101	6	2.08	.925	—	—	—	—	—	—	—	—
1997–98	Detroit Vipers	IHL	6	2	2	2	—	290	20	0	4.13	.859	—	—	—	—	—	—	—	—
1997–98	Indianapolis Ice	IHL	29	11	11	3	—	1506	83	1	3.30	.902	3	1	0	129	10	0	4.62	.851
1998–99	Detroit Vipers	IHL	12	7	3	1	—	643	26	1	2.43	.898	—	—	—	—	—	—	—	—
1998–99	Cincinnati Cyclones	IHL	26	14	9	2	—	1428	81	0	3.40	.895	—	—	—	—	—	—	—	—
1999–00	Ottawa Senators	NHL	1	1	0	0	—	60	2	0	2.00	.895	—	—	—	—	—	—	—	—
1999–00	Grand Rapids Griffins	IHL	52	29	15	4	—	2948	107	4	2.18	.921	17	10	7	1028	37	1	2.16	.924
2000–01	Ottawa Senators	NHL	22	12	5	4	—	1297	54	2	2.50	.904	—	—	—	—	—	—	—	—
2001–02	Ottawa Senators	NHL	25	12	9	1	—	1309	54	3	2.48	.907	—	—	—	—	—	—	—	—
2002–03	Florida Panthers	NHL	28	4	11	6	—	1377	66	1	2.88	.907	—	—	—	—	—	—	—	—
2005–06	Chicago Wolves	AHL	6	2	4	—	0	314	19	0	3.64	.854	—	—	—	—	—	—	—	—
2005–06	Columbia Inferno	ECHL	15	6	7	—	2	894	52	0	3.49	.903	—	—	—	—	—	—	—	—
2005–06	Portland Pirates	AHL	16	11	5	—	0	970	37	1	2.29	.924	16	10	6	—	—	1	3.11	.895
2006–07	TPS	FIN	48	21	16	—	11	2888	121	3	2.51	.918	2	0	2	118	4	0	2.03	.915
2007–08	Malmö Redhawks	SWE-2	39	26	10	—	2	—	—	—	2.02	.920	—	—	—	—	—	—	—	—
2009–10	Malmö Redhawks	SWE-2	5	1	4	—	0	—	—	—	4.30	.854	—	—	—	—	—	—	—	—
2009–10	Ilves	FIN	16	—	—	—	—	—	—	—	3.02	.892	—	—	—	—	—	—	—	—
2010–11	Ilves	FIN	24	—	—	—	—	—	—	—	3.56	.889	—	—	—	—	—	—	—	—
NHL totals			76	29	25	11	—	4041	176	6	2.61	.906	—	—	—	—	—	—	—	—

=== International ===
Year	Team	Event	GP	W	L	T	MIN	GA	SO	GAA	SV%
2002	Finland	OLY	3	1	2	0	179	9	0	3.01	.909
2003	Finland	WC	3	2	0	0	160	4	2	1.50	.897
Senior totals			6	3	2	0	339	13	2	2.30	—

== Awards ==
- Lasse Oksanen trophy (top player in SM-liiga): 1996–97 season
- Urpo Ylönen trophy (top goaltender in SM-liiga): 1996–97 season
- Jarmo Wasama memorial trophy (top rookie in SM-liiga): 1995–96 season

Preceded by Juha Riihijärvi	Winner of the Lasse Oksanen trophy 1996–97	Succeeded by Raimo Helminen
Preceded by Ari Sulander	Winner of the Urpo Ylönen trophy 1996–97	Succeeded by Tim Thomas
Preceded by Joni Lehto	Winner of the Jarmo Wasama memorial trophy 1995–96	Succeeded by Olli Jokinen
