= Jukka Peltola =

Finnish ice hockey player

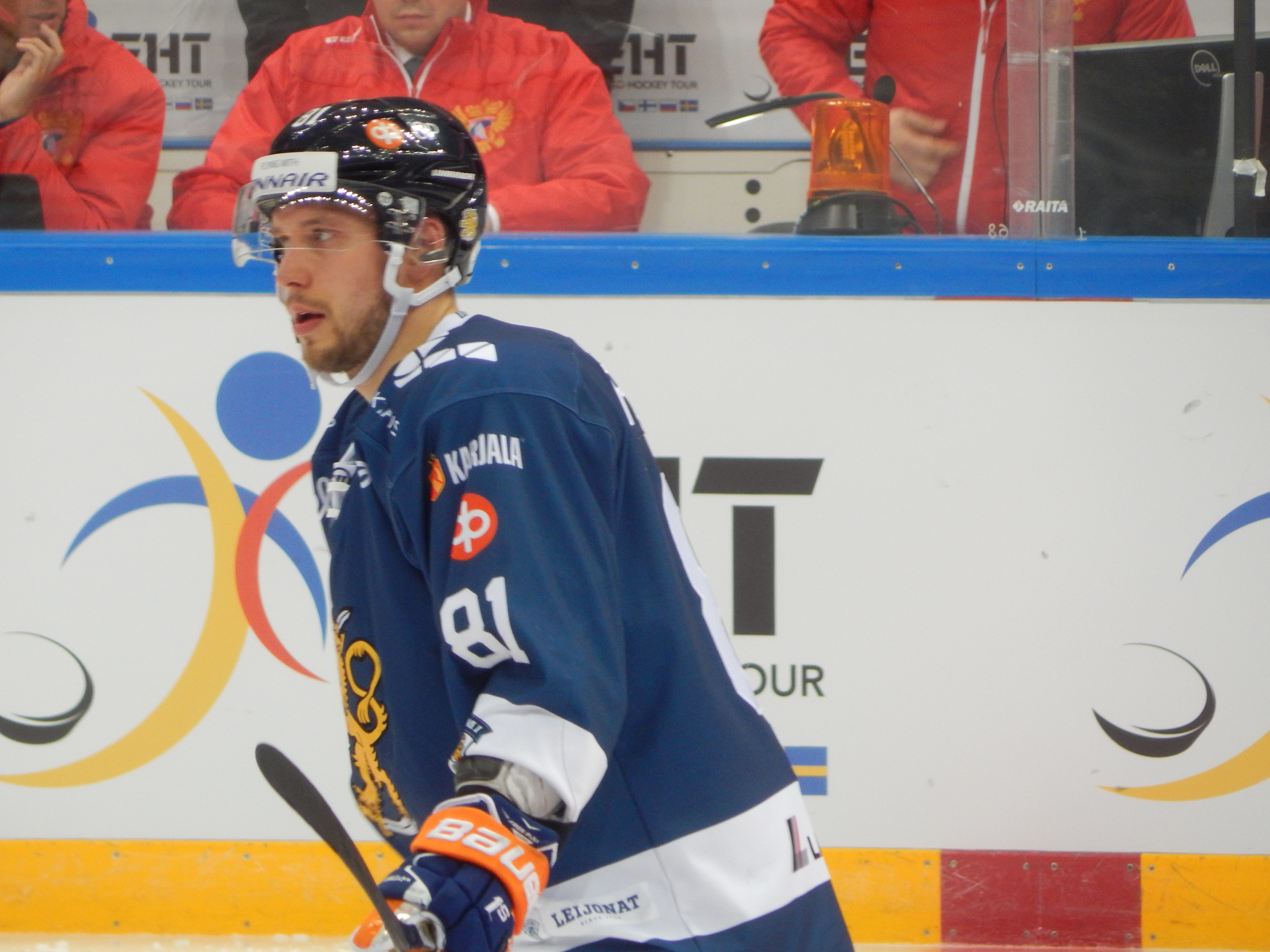
- Peltola in 2017
- Born: 26 August 1987 (age 39) Tampere, Finland
- Height: 6 ft 1 in (185 cm)
- Weight: 187 lb (85 kg; 13 st 5 lb)
- Position: Forward
- Shot: Left
- Played for: Tappara; LeKi; Sibir Novosibirsk
- National team: Finland
- Playing career: 2006–2022

Jukka Peltola (born 26 August 1987) is a Finnish former professional ice hockey Forward.

== Playing career ==
Peltola played throughout the first 12 seasons of his professional career with Tappara of the Finnish Liiga.

Peltola prefers to play as a right wing, but he can play other forward positions and even as a defenceman when needed. He is known as an elite two-way forward, but in the 2015–16 season, he made his personal record when he scored 17 goals and had 22 assists in 59 games. In the 2016–17 season, he led his team to second consecutive championship and was awarded the Jari Kurri Trophy which is handed to the most valuable player of Liiga playoffs.

Despite having a contract with Tappara until 2019, Peltola agreed to a new challenge in signing a one-year contract for the 2018–19 season with Russian outfit, HC Sibir Novosibirsk of the KHL, on 27 April 2018.

== International play ==
Peltola was also called into the National Team for the first time in five years in 2017. He made his full international debut for Finland at the 2018 Winter Olympics.

== Career statistics ==
=== Regular season and playoffs ===
| | | | Regular season | | | | | Playoffs |
| Season | Team | League | GP | G | A | Pts | PIM | GP | G | A | Pts | PIM |
|---|---|---|---|---|---|---|---|---|---|---|---|---|
| 2003–04 | KOOVEE | FIN.2 U18 | 6 | 2 | 3 | 5 | 0 | 10 | 3 | 2 | 5 | 2 |
| 2004–05 | Tappara | FIN U18 | 30 | 9 | 10 | 19 | 4 | 2 | 0 | 1 | 1 | 0 |
| 2005–06 | Tappara | FIN U20 | 37 | 7 | 4 | 11 | 12 | — | — | — | — | — |
| 2006–07 | Tappara | FIN U20 | 32 | 15 | 22 | 37 | 6 | 5 | 1 | 0 | 1 | 0 |
| 2006–07 | Tappara | SM-l | 4 | 0 | 0 | 0 | 0 | — | — | — | — | — |
| 2007–08 | Tappara | FIN U20 | 28 | 13 | 18 | 31 | 26 | 3 | 0 | 1 | 1 | 0 |
| 2007–08 | Tappara | SM-l | 15 | 0 | 1 | 1 | 0 | — | — | — | — | — |
| 2008–09 | Tappara | SM-l | 52 | 8 | 11 | 19 | 10 | — | — | — | — | — |
| 2009–10 | Tappara | SM-l | 49 | 4 | 4 | 8 | 12 | 9 | 0 | 1 | 1 | 0 |
| 2009–10 | LeKi | Mestis | 2 | 0 | 0 | 0 | 2 | — | — | — | — | — |
| 2010–11 | Tappara | SM-l | 55 | 4 | 12 | 16 | 22 | — | — | — | — | — |
| 2011–12 | Tappara | SM-l | 47 | 8 | 16 | 24 | 18 | — | — | — | — | — |
| 2012–13 | Tappara | SM-l | 52 | 6 | 4 | 10 | 12 | 15 | 6 | 2 | 8 | 6 |
| 2013–14 | Tappara | Liiga | 60 | 7 | 17 | 24 | 22 | 20 | 2 | 3 | 5 | 8 |
| 2014–15 | Tappara | Liiga | 59 | 9 | 14 | 23 | 51 | 20 | 4 | 4 | 8 | 2 |
| 2015–16 | Tappara | Liiga | 59 | 17 | 22 | 39 | 16 | 17 | 1 | 3 | 4 | 2 |
| 2016–17 | Tappara | Liiga | 51 | 11 | 24 | 35 | 20 | 18 | 4 | 5 | 9 | 0 |
| 2017–18 | Tappara | Liiga | 54 | 14 | 19 | 33 | 12 | 16 | 6 | 7 | 13 | 2 |
| 2018–19 | Sibir Novosibirsk | KHL | 45 | 8 | 13 | 21 | 8 | — | — | — | — | — |
| 2019–20 | Sibir Novosibirsk | KHL | 48 | 9 | 13 | 22 | 12 | 5 | 0 | 1 | 1 | 0 |
| 2020–21 | Tappara | Liiga | 52 | 13 | 15 | 28 | 10 | 9 | 4 | 4 | 8 | 4 |
| 2021–22 | Tappara | Liiga | 25 | 2 | 3 | 5 | 4 | 12 | 1 | 4 | 5 | 2 |
| Liiga totals | | | 634 | 103 | 162 | 265 | 209 | 136 | 28 | 33 | 61 | 26 |

=== International ===
| Year | Team | Event | GP | G | A | Pts | PIM |
|---|---|---|---|---|---|---|---|
| 2018 | Finland | OG | 5 | 0 | 1 | 1 | 2 |
| Senior totals | | | 5 | 0 | 1 | 1 | 2 |
