= Robin Press =

Swedish ice hockey player (born 1994)

- Born: 21 December 1994 (age 31) Uppsala, Sweden
- Height: 6 ft 3 in (191 cm)
- Weight: 209 lb (95 kg; 14 st 13 lb)
- Position: Defence
- Shoots: Right
- DEL team Former teams: Kölner Haie; Djurgårdens IF; Färjestad BK; Lukko; Severstal Cherepovets; Metallurg Magnitogorsk
- NHL draft: 211th overall, 2013; Chicago Blackhawks
- Playing career: 2012–present

Robin Press (born 21 December 1994) is a Swedish ice hockey defenceman. He is currently playing with Kölner Haie in the Deutsche Eishockey Liga (DEL). He was selected by the Chicago Blackhawks in the 7th round (211th overall and last player taken) of the 2013 NHL entry draft.

With Metallurg Magnitogorsk in the KHL, Press won the Gagarin Cup Championship in 2024.

== Playing career ==
Press previously played for Almtuna IS and Södertälje SK in the Swedish second tier HockeyAllsvenskan before making his Swedish Hockey League debut with Djurgårdens IF.

After playing two seasons in North America, within the Chicago Blackhawks affiliates, the Rockford IceHogs and Indy Fuel, Press returned to Sweden in agreeing to a one-year contract with Färjestad BK on May 24, 2018. In the 2018–19 season, Press contributed 2 goals and 10 points through 40 games, eclipsing his previous markers.

On 2 May 2019, Press opted to continue his career in Finland, agreeing to an optional two-year contract with Lukko of the Liiga. During his tenure with Lukko, Press developed his offensive game and established himself as the club's top defenceman. In the 2020–21 season, Press led the Lukko blueline and also led the Liiga in scoring in points among defenseman with 17 goals and 48 points in 58 regular season games. He was recognized as the league's best defenseman and player of the regular season after he was awarded the Pekka Rautakallio trophy and the Lasse Oksanen trophy. He contributed with 8 post-season points through 11 games to help Lukko capture their first Kanada-malja trophy.

As a free agent, Press opted to test himself in the KHL, joining Severstal Cherepovets on a one-year contract on 1 May 2021. He extended his contract the following year, which caused controversy as he was the first Swedish ice hockey player to sign a contract with KHL after the 2022 Russian invasion of Ukraine.

On 2 May 2023, Press continued his tenure in the KHL by signing a one-year contract with Metallurg Magnitogorsk. He became KHL champion at the end of the season.

After five seasons in the KHL, Press left Metallurg Magnitogorsk. On July 7, 2026, the Kölner Haie officially announced the signing of Press, marking his first stint in Germany.

== Career statistics ==
			Regular season					Playoffs
Season	Team	League	GP	G	A	Pts	PIM	GP	G	A	Pts	PIM
2010–11	Almtuna IS	J18	31	7	6	13	8	—	—	—	—	—
2011–12	Almtuna IS	J18	16	4	10	14	34	—	—	—	—	—
2011–12	Almtuna IS	J18 Allsv	12	4	6	10	18	—	—	—	—	—
2011–12	Almtuna IS	SWE.2 U20	24	15	20	35	26	—	—	—	—	—
2011–12	Almtuna IS	Allsv	9	0	1	1	4	—	—	—	—	—
2012–13	Södertälje SK	J20	26	7	9	16	16	3	0	2	2	0
2012–13	Södertälje SK	Allsv	41	2	2	4	10	8	0	1	1	4
2013–14	Södertälje SK	J20	10	6	7	13	6	4	0	3	3	4
2013–14	Södertälje SK	Allsv	51	4	11	15	20	—	—	—	—	—
2014–15	Södertälje SK	J20	1	0	1	1	0	—	—	—	—	—
2014–15	Södertälje SK	Allsv	51	13	17	30	12	—	—	—	—	—
2014–15	Rockford IceHogs	AHL	2	0	0	0	0	4	0	0	0	0
2015–16	Djurgårdens IF	SHL	51	1	2	3	12	7	0	0	0	2
2016–17	Djurgårdens IF	SHL	11	0	1	1	2	—	—	—	—	—
2016–17	Rockford IceHogs	AHL	9	0	0	0	2	—	—	—	—	—
2016–17	Indy Fuel	ECHL	30	2	8	10	14	—	—	—	—	—
2017–18	Rockford IceHogs	AHL	7	0	0	0	2	—	—	—	—	—
2017–18	Indy Fuel	ECHL	52	10	34	44	16	—	—	—	—	—
2018–19	Färjestad BK	J20	1	2	1	3	0	—	—	—	—	—
2018–19	Färjestad BK	SHL	40	2	8	10	8	2	0	0	0	0
2019–20	Lukko	Liiga	59	8	21	29	6	—	—	—	—	—
2020–21	Lukko	Liiga	58	17	31	48	28	11	3	5	8	0
2021–22	Severstal Cherepovets	KHL	48	5	13	18	10	7	2	1	3	0
2022–23	Severstal Cherepovets	KHL	64	11	31	42	24	7	2	4	6	6
2023–24	Metallurg Magnitogorsk	KHL	64	7	32	39	18	23	3	14	17	6
2024–25	Metallurg Magnitogorsk	KHL	63	7	35	42	30	6	0	0	0	2
2025–26	Metallurg Magnitogorsk	KHL	62	5	36	41	14	15	5	5	10	0
SHL totals			102	3	11	14	22	9	0	0	0	2
Liiga totals			117	25	52	77	42	11	3	5	8	0
KHL totals			301	35	147	182	96	58	12	24	36	14

== Awards and honours ==
Award	Year
Liiga
Pekka Rautakallio trophy	2021
Lasse Oksanen Trophy	2021
Champions (Lukko)	2021
All-Star Team	2021
KHL
Gagarin Cup (Metallurg Magnitogorsk)	2024
