= Cory Murphy =

Canadian ice hockey player

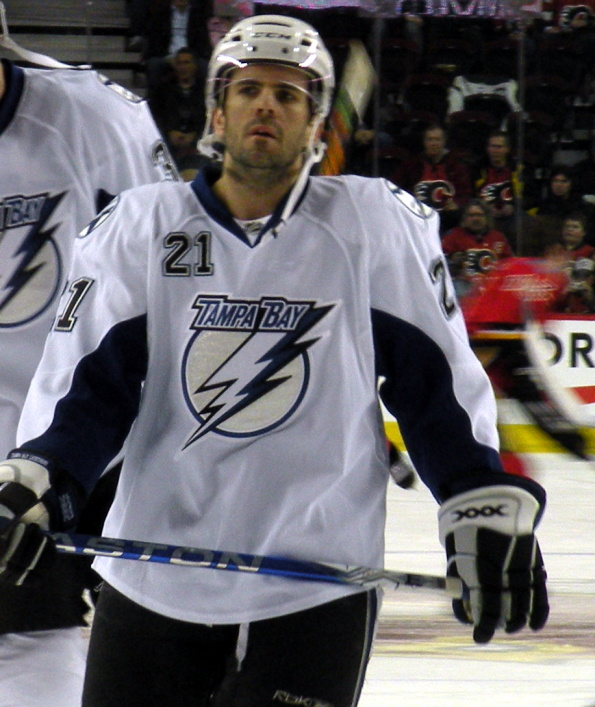
- Born: February 13, 1978 (age 47); Kanata, Ontario, Canada
- Height: 5 ft 10 in (178 cm)
- Weight: 185 lb (84 kg; 13 st 3 lb)
- Position: Defence
- Shot: Right
- Played for: Blues; Ilves; HC Fribourg-Gottéron; HIFK; Florida Panthers; Tampa Bay Lightning; New Jersey Devils; ZSC Lions; HC Dinamo Minsk; Växjö Lakers; Karlskrona HK
- National team: Canada
- NHL draft: Undrafted
- Playing career: 2001–2018

Cory Murphy (born February 13, 1978) is a Canadian former professional ice hockey defenceman. He is currently a player development coach for the Seattle Kraken.

== Playing career ==
Undrafted, Murphy played collegiate hockey with Colgate University. Murphy then played five seasons in SM-liiga, the top professional ice hockey league in Finland; two for Blues, two for Ilves and in 2006–07 for HIFK. In the 2003–04 season with Ilves, he was chosen to the series' all-star team. In the 2006–07 season with HIFK, he was awarded Kultainen kypärä for best player in the league, as well as the Lasse Oksanen trophy for best player of the season during regular season play and Pekka Rautakallio trophy for best defenseman of the season. Murphy was a member of the Canadian team in the 2007 IIHF World Championship that won gold in a 4–2 win against Finland in Moscow.

On March 27, 2007, Murphy signed a two-year National Hockey League contract with the Florida Panthers. Murphy's first NHL goal was scored October 6, 2007 against Kevin Weekes of the New Jersey Devils.

In the 2008–09 season, Murphy played seven games for the Panthers while bothered by a re-occurring shoulder injury. Murphy was sent to the Panthers affiliate, the Rochester Americans, for a two-week conditioning stint before being recalled by the Panthers on January 15, 2009. Murphy was subsequently claimed off re-entry waivers by the Tampa Bay Lightning on January 19, 2009. On July 17, 2009, he was signed by the New Jersey Devils to a two-way contract.

On June 4, 2010, Murphy returned to Switzerland, signing a two-year contract with ZSC Lions of the NLA. At the conclusion of his deal with the Lions, and spending the 2012–13 season in the Kontinental Hockey League with HC Dynamo Minsk on May 21, 2013, Murphy signed a two-year deal with the Swedish team Växjö Lakers of the then named Elitserien.

In his 18th and final professional season in 2017–18, Murphy joined Karlskrona HK of the SHL; he scored 1 goal and 15 points through 51 games, unable to help Karlskrona avoid relegation.

== Coaching career ==
On May 21, 2018, Murphy announced his retirement from playing professional hockey upon accepting an assistant coaching role with Rögle BK of the SHL for the 2018–19 season.

== Career statistics ==
=== Regular season and playoffs ===
| | | | Regular season | | | | | Playoffs |
| Season | Team | League | GP | G | A | Pts | PIM | GP | G | A | Pts | PIM |
|---|---|---|---|---|---|---|---|---|---|---|---|---|
| 1994–95 | Kanata Valley Lasers | CJHL | 51 | 6 | 20 | 26 | 62 | — | — | — | — | — |
| 1995–96 | Kanata Valley Lasers | CJHL | 53 | 20 | 36 | 56 | 70 | — | — | — | — | — |
| 1996–97 | Kanata Valley Lasers | CJHL | 53 | 22 | 37 | 59 | 52 | — | — | — | — | — |
| 1997–98 | Colgate University | ECAC | 35 | 8 | 19 | 27 | 38 | — | — | — | — | — |
| 1998–99 | Colgate University | ECAC | 34 | 3 | 23 | 26 | 26 | — | — | — | — | — |
| 1999–2000 | Colgate University | ECAC | 35 | 10 | 19 | 29 | 26 | — | — | — | — | — |
| 2000–01 | Colgate University | ECAC | 34 | 7 | 22 | 29 | 34 | — | — | — | — | — |
| 2001–02 | Blues | SM-l | 46 | 9 | 15 | 24 | 38 | 3 | 0 | 1 | 1 | 0 |
| 2002–03 | Blues | SM-l | 45 | 11 | 4 | 15 | 49 | 7 | 1 | 0 | 1 | 2 |
| 2003–04 | Ilves | SM-l | 56 | 18 | 26 | 44 | 22 | 7 | 1 | 2 | 3 | 2 |
| 2004–05 | Ilves | SM-l | 56 | 12 | 23 | 35 | 36 | 7 | 1 | 3 | 4 | 18 |
| 2005–06 | HC Fribourg–Gottéron | NLA | 44 | 13 | 22 | 35 | 52 | — | — | — | — | — |
| 2006–07 | HIFK | SM-l | 45 | 13 | 37 | 50 | 46 | 5 | 0 | 1 | 1 | 4 |
| 2007–08 | Florida Panthers | NHL | 47 | 2 | 15 | 17 | 22 | — | — | — | — | — |
| 2008–09 | Florida Panthers | NHL | 7 | 0 | 1 | 1 | 2 | — | — | — | — | — |
| 2008–09 | Rochester Americans | AHL | 5 | 2 | 4 | 6 | 2 | — | — | — | — | — |
| 2008–09 | Tampa Bay Lightning | NHL | 25 | 5 | 10 | 15 | 12 | — | — | — | — | — |
| 2009–10 | New Jersey Devils | NHL | 12 | 2 | 1 | 3 | 2 | — | — | — | — | — |
| 2009–10 | Lowell Devils | AHL | 64 | 6 | 38 | 44 | 30 | 5 | 0 | 0 | 0 | 2 |
| 2010–11 | ZSC Lions | NLA | 49 | 10 | 25 | 35 | 30 | 5 | 0 | 3 | 3 | 0 |
| 2011–12 | ZSC Lions | NLA | 24 | 3 | 7 | 10 | 4 | — | — | — | — | — |
| 2012–13 | Dinamo Minsk | KHL | 52 | 5 | 26 | 31 | 36 | — | — | — | — | — |
| 2013–14 | Växjö Lakers | SHL | 53 | 13 | 21 | 34 | 24 | 12 | 1 | 3 | 4 | 8 |
| 2014–15 | Växjö Lakers | SHL | 55 | 9 | 30 | 39 | 18 | 18 | 0 | 9 | 9 | 4 |
| 2015–16 | Växjö Lakers | SHL | 52 | 3 | 22 | 25 | 45 | 12 | 0 | 1 | 1 | 4 |
| 2016–17 | Växjö Lakers | SHL | 48 | 3 | 16 | 19 | 28 | 6 | 0 | 2 | 2 | 2 |
| 2017–18 | Karlskrona HK | SHL | 51 | 1 | 14 | 15 | 32 | — | — | — | — | — |
| SM-l totals | | | 248 | 63 | 105 | 168 | 191 | 29 | 3 | 7 | 10 | 26 |
| NHL totals | | | 91 | 9 | 27 | 36 | 38 | — | — | — | — | — |
| SHL totals | | | 259 | 29 | 103 | 132 | 147 | 48 | 1 | 15 | 16 | 18 |

=== International ===
Medal record

Representing (Canada)

Ice hockey

World Championships
| Gold medal – first place | 2007 Moscow | |

| Year | Team | Event | Result | GP | G | A | Pts | PIM |
|---|---|---|---|---|---|---|---|---|
| 2007 | Canada | WC | 1st place, gold medalist(s) | 9 | 1 | 6 | 7 | 8 |
| Senior totals | | | | 9 | 1 | 6 | 7 | 8 |

== Awards and honours ==
| Award | Year |
|---|---|
College
| All-ECAC Hockey Rookie Team | 1997–98 |
| All-ECAC Hockey First Team | 1999–00 |
| All-ECAC Hockey Second Team | 2000–01 |
Liiga
| All-Star Team | 2004, 2007 |
| Lasse Oksanen trophy | 2007 |
| Pekka Rautakallio trophy | 2007 |
| Kultainen kypärä | 2007 |
SHL
| Defenseman of the Year | 2015 |
| SHL Champion (Växjö Lakers) | 2015 |

Awards and achievements
| Preceded by Tony Salmelainen | Winner of the Lasse Oksanen trophy 2006–07 | Succeeded by Ville Leino |
