= Pavol Skalický =

Slovak ice hockey player

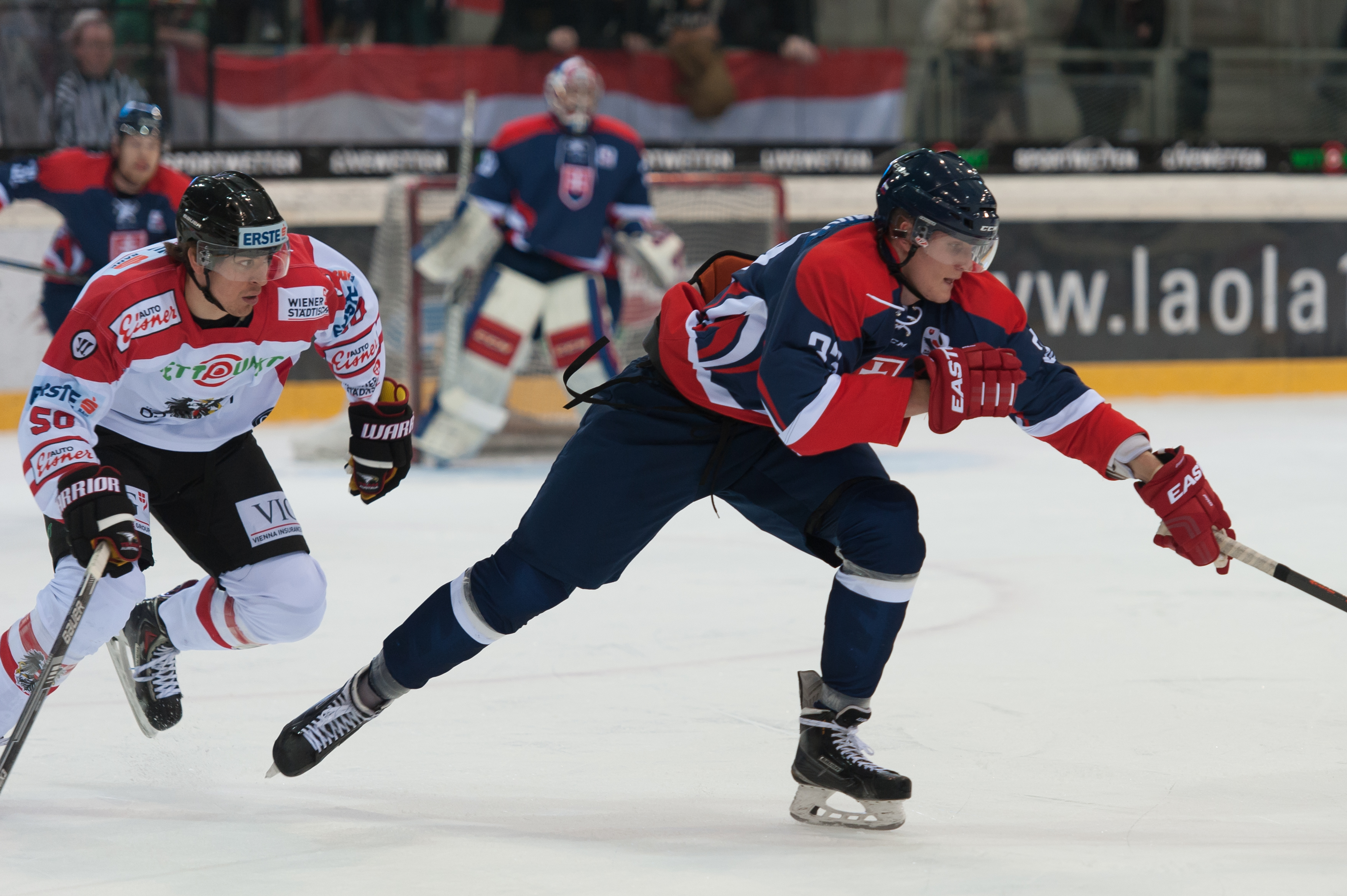
- Born: October 9, 1995 (age 29); Gelnica, Slovakia
- Height: 6 ft 5 in (196 cm)
- Weight: 207 lb (94 kg; 14 st 11 lb)
- Position: Forward
- Shoots: Right
- Liiga team Former teams: HC TPS; HK Spišská Nová Ves; HK Orange 20; HC Košice; Örebro HK; HC Slovan Bratislava; HC '05 Banská Bystrica; BK Mladá Boleslav; Lukko
- National team: Slovakia
- Playing career: 2013–present

Pavol Skalický (born October 9, 1995) is a Slovak professional ice hockey player. He is currently playing for HC TPS in the Finnish Liiga.

Skalicky made his Swedish Hockey League debut playing with Örebro HK during the 2014–15 SHL season. After three seasons in the Kontinental Hockey League with Slovak club, HC Slovan Bratislava, Skalicky left as a free agent in securing a one-year contract with Czech top tier club, BK Mladá Boleslav, of the ELH on May 1, 2018.

== Career statistics ==
=== Regular season and playoffs ===
			Regular season					Playoffs
Season	Team	League	GP	G	A	Pts	PIM	GP	G	A	Pts	PIM
2012–13	HK Spišská Nová Ves	Slovak-Jr.	16	0	5	5	4	4	0	1	1	2
2012–13	HK Spišská Nová Ves	Slovak.1	6	1	1	2	0	3	0	0	0	0
2013–14	HK Orange 20	Slovak	17	2	2	4	16	—	—	—	—	—
2013–14	HC Košice	Slovak	4	0	0	0	0	16	1	0	1	0
2013–14	HK Spišská Nová Ves	Slovak.1	5	0	5	5	2	3	1	4	5	2
2014–15	HK Orange 20	Slovak	20	4	2	6	18	—	—	—	—	—
2014–15	Örebro HK	J20	15	6	10	16	39	3	1	2	3	12
2014–15	Örebro HK	SHL	1	0	0	0	0	—	—	—	—	—
2015–16	HC Slovan Bratislava	Slovak-Jr.	0	0	0	0	0	4	1	3	4	12
2015–16	HC Slovan Bratislava	KHL	60	6	2	8	20	4	0	0	0	7
2016–17	HC Slovan Bratislava	KHL	35	4	3	7	16	—	—	—	—	—
2016–17	HC '05 Banská Bystrica	Slovak	12	2	6	8	6	15	7	7	14	8
2017–18	HC Slovan Bratislava	KHL	56	2	6	8	78	—	—	—	—	—
2017–18	HC '05 Banská Bystrica	Slovak	10	2	4	6	0	16	5	5	10	20
2018–19	BK Mladá Boleslav	ELH	51	9	14	23	18	10	0	5	5	4
2019–20	BK Mladá Boleslav	ELH	51	18	27	45	50	—	—	—	—	—
2020–21	Lukko	Liiga	55	20	19	39	30	11	4	4	8	2
2021–22	Lukko	Liiga	52	13	22	35	55	4	3	0	3	0
KHL totals			151	12	11	23	114	4	0	0	0	7
Liiga totals			107	33	41	74	85	15	7	4	11	2

Medal record

Representing Slovakia

Ice hockey

IIHF World U20 Championship
Bronze medal – third place	2015 Canada	

=== International ===
Year	Team	Event	Result	GP	G	A	Pts	PIM
2014	Slovakia	WJC	8th	5	0	0	0	2
2015	Slovakia	WJC	3rd place, bronze medalist(s)	7	1	1	2	4
2016	Slovakia	WC	9th	4	1	0	1	0
2017	Slovakia	WC	14th	7	0	1	1	0
2018	Slovakia	WC	9th	2	0	0	0	0
2021	Slovakia	WC	8th	6	0	0	0	2
Junior totals				12	1	1	2	6
Senior totals				19	1	1	2	2

== Awards and honors ==
Award	Year
Slovak Extraliga
Champion	2014, 2017, 2018
Liiga
Champion	2021
