= Ville Leino =

Finnish ice hockey player (born 1983)

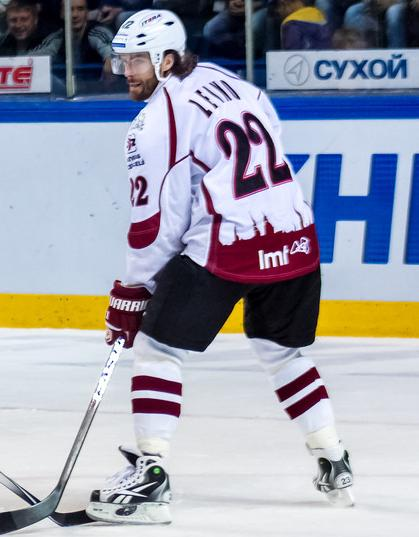
- Leino with Dinamo Riga in 2015
- Born: 6 October 1983 (age 42) Savonlinna, Finland
- Height: 6 ft 1 in (185 cm)
- Weight: 190 lb (86 kg; 13 st 8 lb)
- Position: Left wing
- Shot: Left
- Played for: Ilves; HPK; Jokerit; Detroit Red Wings; Philadelphia Flyers; Buffalo Sabres; KHL Medveščak Zagreb; Kloten Flyers; Dinamo Riga; Växjö Lakers
- NHL draft: Undrafted
- Playing career: 2002–2017

Ville Hans Viking Leino (born 6 October 1983) is a Finnish former professional ice hockey forward. He has played in the National Hockey League (NHL) for the Detroit Red Wings, Philadelphia Flyers and Buffalo Sabres.

== Playing career ==
=== Finland ===
At age 17, Leino started playing for his hometown hockey team SaPKo in the Suomi-sarja. He was then recruited to the SM-liiga by Ilves, and later moved on to HPK, where he led the team in scoring in the 2005–06 season when HPK won their first SM-liiga championship.

In 2007, Leino was signed by Jokerit, where he was switched from centre to wing. In his first season with the team, he broke the club record for most points in the regular season when he surpassed Timo Sutinen's record of 73. He went on to finish second in scoring, and won the Lasse Oksanen trophy for the best player during the regular season in the SM-liiga.

=== North America ===
On 10 May 2008, Leino signed a one-year contract with the NHL's Detroit Red Wings. Due to the Red Wings' salary cap issues, however, Leino was assigned to the team's American Hockey League (AHL) affiliate, the Grand Rapids Griffins. Then-Red Wings Head Coach Mike Babcock commented that Leino was the "best player" he had ever sent to the minors. Ville was eventually recalled from the Griffins on 29 January 2009.

In the first period of his NHL debut on 31 January 2009, Leino scored a goal against goaltender José Théodore in a 4–2 loss to the Washington Capitals.

Leino signed a one-way, two-year extension with the Red Wings on 6 July 2009.

On 6 February 2010, Leino was traded to the Philadelphia Flyers in exchange for Norwegian defenceman Ole-Kristian Tollefsen and a fifth-round draft pick in 2011. Leino had two goals and two assists in 14 games with the Flyers during the regular season. He then began the 2010 Stanley Cup playoffs out of the lineup as a healthy scratch, but injuries to Simon Gagné and Jeff Carter forced Leino into action. Forming the most offensively-productive line in the playoffs alongside Daniel Brière and Scott Hartnell, Leino scored seven goals and 14 assists for 21 points in 19 games, tying the rookie record for most points in the Stanley Cup playoffs held by Dino Ciccarelli.

On 12 March 2011, during the 2010–11 regular season, Leino recorded his first career hat-trick against the Atlanta Thrashers. On 24 April, during the first round of the 2011 playoffs against the Buffalo Sabres, Leino scored the game-winning goal in overtime of Game 6 of the series to bring Philadelphia even with Buffalo, three games apiece. He finished the playoffs with three goals and two assists as the Flyers were ultimately swept in the Eastern Conference Semifinals by the eventual Stanley Cup champion Boston Bruins.

Leino became an unrestricted free agent at the end of the 2011 season, whereupon he signed a six-year, $27 million contract with Buffalo on 1 July 2011. His performance during the 2011–12 season, however, was much maligned, as he scored just eight goals with 17 assists during 71 games, failing to live up to the expectations of his recently signed contract. Continuing sub-par play in the 2012–13 and 2013–14 seasons (he failed to score a single goal in the latter) prompted incoming Head Coach Ted Nolan to bench Leino near the end of the 2013–14 season, leading to speculation that the Sabres would buy out his contract at the end of the season. On 17 June, in the off-season, the Sabres indeed placed Leino on unconditional waivers for the purpose of a compliance buyout. Leino would later reflect upon his final season in Buffalo as a very unpleasant experience, akin to spending time in jail because of the high pressure on him to live up to his contract.

=== Return to Europe ===
As an unrestricted free agent again, Leino attended the Boston Bruins training camp for the 2014–15 season on a player tryout offer, but was eventually released from the team on 29 September. He returned to Europe in signing a one-year contract with Croatian-based Kontinental Hockey League club, KHL Medveščak Zagreb, on 12 October 2014. After scoring 15 points in 28 games in Zagreb, Leino left to sign in the Swiss league for the remainder of the campaign with the Kloten Flyers of the National League A on 13 February 2015.

On 24 July 2015, Leino made a return to the KHL in signing a one-year contract with Latvian club, Dinamo Riga of the KHL.

On 3 October 2017, Leino announced his retirement.

== Business endeavors ==
In 2014, Ville Leino created his lifestyle brand "Billebeino" with the promise that 40% of his products contain pure waste fabrics and are made of 100% recycled materials. Since then, they have collaborated with brands such as The Beatles, EA Sports, Wilson Sporting Goods, Angry Birds and more through their European and American storefront (Angry Birds being the only collab to be on both storefronts).

== International play ==
Leino made his international debut for Finland on the 2006–07 Euro Hockey Tour.

== Records ==
- NHL – Most points in the Stanley Cup playoffs by a rookie, 21 (2010) (tied with Dino Ciccarelli and Jake Guentzel)
- NHL – most assists in the Stanley Cup playoffs by a rookie, 14 (2010)
- NHL – most assists in the Stanley Cup Final by a rookie, 6 (2010)

== Career statistics ==
			Regular season					Playoffs
Season	Team	League	GP	G	A	Pts	PIM	GP	G	A	Pts	PIM
2000–01	SaPKo	FIN.2 U20	19	14	12	26	0	—	—	—	—	—
2000–01	SaPKo	FIN.4	2	0	0	0	16	—	—	—	—	—
2001–02	SaPKo	FIN.2 U20	26	36	36	72	14	4	2	5	7	2
2001–02	SaPKo	FIN.4	15	6	6	12	4	—	—	—	—	—
2002–03	Ilves	FIN U20	11	6	5	11	14	—	—	—	—	—
2002–03	Ilves	SM-l	23	1	1	2	0	—	—	—	—	—
2003–04	Ilves	FIN U20	5	4	6	10	6	—	—	—	—	—
2003–04	Ilves	SM-l	54	9	15	24	26	7	1	1	2	4
2004–05	Ilves	SM-l	56	8	11	19	32	7	1	0	1	2
2005–06	HPK	SM-l	56	12	31	43	65	13	3	9	12	4
2006–07	HPK	SM-l	50	11	29	40	73	8	1	9	10	31
2007–08	Jokerit	SM-l	55	28	49	77	18	14	8	11	19	8
2008–09	Detroit Red Wings	NHL	13	5	4	9	6	7	0	2	2	0
2008–09	Grand Rapids Griffins	AHL	57	15	31	46	18	10	3	10	13	10
2009–10	Detroit Red Wings	NHL	42	4	3	7	6	—	—	—	—	—
2009–10	Philadelphia Flyers	NHL	13	2	2	4	4	19	7	14	21	6
2010–11	Philadelphia Flyers	NHL	81	19	34	53	22	11	3	2	5	0
2011–12	Buffalo Sabres	NHL	71	8	17	25	16	—	—	—	—	—
2012–13	Buffalo Sabres	NHL	8	2	4	6	6	—	—	—	—	—
2013–14	Buffalo Sabres	NHL	58	0	15	15	10	—	—	—	—	—
2014–15	KHL Medveščak Zagreb	KHL	28	7	8	15	28	—	—	—	—	—
2014–15	Kloten Flyers	NLA	4	0	1	1	0	—	—	—	—	—
2015–16	Dinamo Riga	KHL	39	3	9	12	8	—	—	—	—	—
2015–16	Växjö Lakers	SHL	17	2	12	14	2	13	0	3	3	8
2016–17	Växjö Lakers	SHL	44	8	15	23	14	6	0	2	2	2
SM-l totals			294	69	136	205	214	49	14	30	44	49
NHL totals			286	40	79	119	70	37	10	18	28	6

== Awards and honours ==
Award	Year
Liiga
All-Star Team	2006, 2008
Lasse Oksanen trophy	2008

Awards and achievements
Preceded by Cory Murphy	Winner of the Lasse Oksanen trophy 2007–08	Succeeded by Juuso Riksman
