= Lasse Oksanen trophy =

Ice hockey trophy awarded by the Finnish Liiga

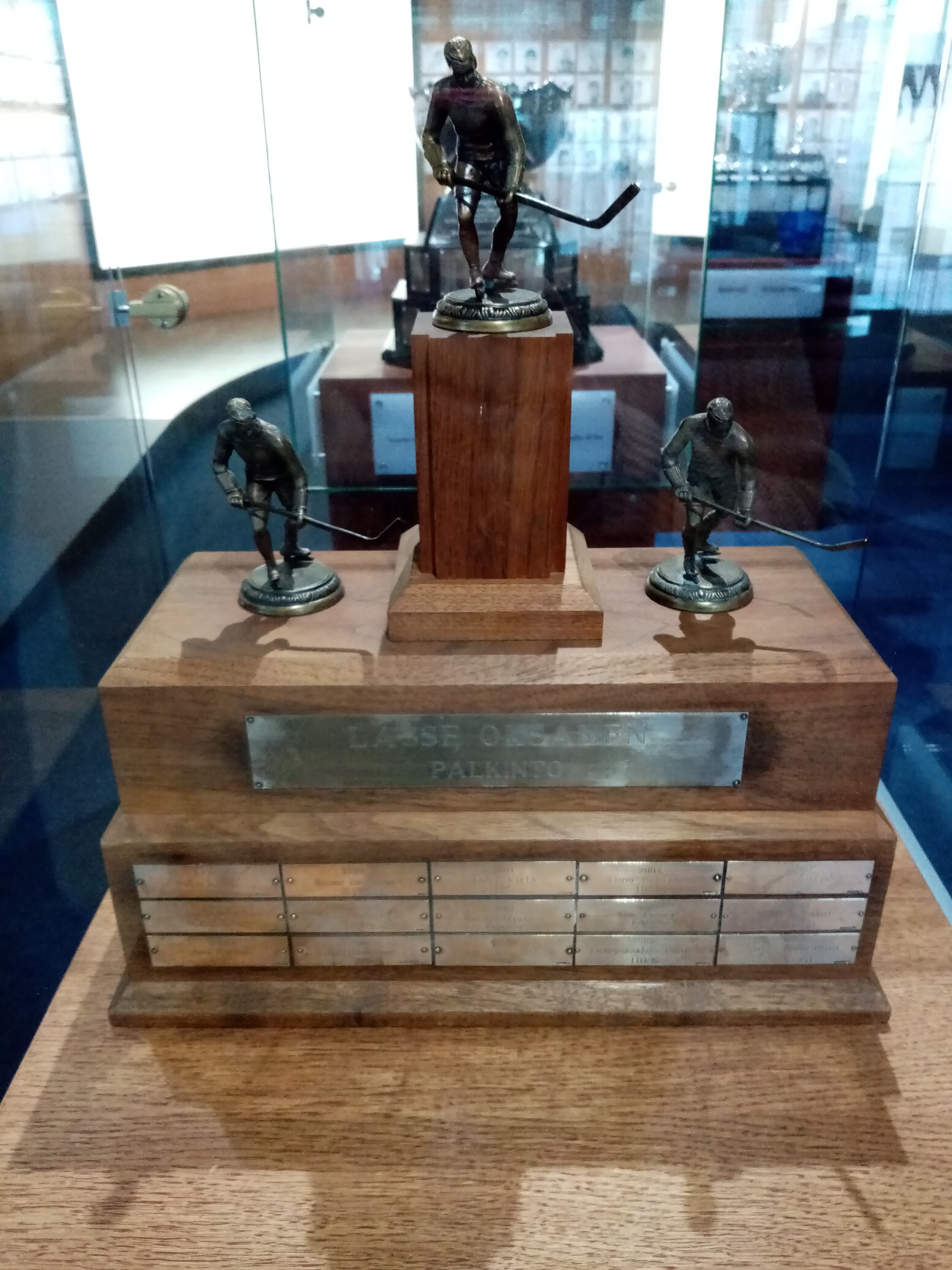
Lasse Oksanen trophy

The Lasse Oksanen trophy is an ice hockey trophy awarded by the Finnish Liiga to the best player of the season during regular season play.

Trophy winners:

1993-94: Esa Keskinen (TPS)

1994-95: Saku Koivu (TPS)

1995-96: Juha Riihijärvi (Lukko)

1996-97: Jani Hurme (TPS)

1997-98: Raimo Helminen (Ilves)

1998-99: Jan Caloun (HIFK)

1999-00: Kai Nurminen (TPS)

2000-01: Tony Virta (TPS)

2001-02: Janne Ojanen (Tappara)

2002-03: Antti Miettinen (HPK)

2003-04: Timo Pärssinen (HIFK)

2004-05: Tim Thomas (Jokerit)

2005-06: Tony Salmelainen (HIFK)

2006-07: Cory Murphy (HIFK)

2007-08: Ville Leino (Jokerit)

2008-09: Juuso Riksman (Jokerit)

2009-10: Jori Lehterä (Tappara)

2010-11: Ville Peltonen (HIFK)

2011-12: Tomas Zaborsky (Ässät)

2012-13: Antti Raanta (Ässät)

2013-14: Michael Keränen (Ilves)

2014-15: Kim Hirschovits (Blues)

2015-16: Kristian Kuusela (Tappara)

2016-17: Mika Pyörälä (Kärpät)

2017-18: Julius Junttila (Kärpät)

2018-19: Oliwer Kaski (Pelicans)

2019-20: Justin Danforth (Lukko)

2020-21: Robin Press (Lukko)

2021-22: Petrus Palmu (Jukurit)

2022-23: Michael Joly (HPK)

2023-24: Jerry Turkulainen (JYP)

2024-25: Atro Leppänen (Sport)

2025-26: Benjamin Rautiainen (Tappara)
