= Heikki Liedes =

Finnish ice hockey player

- Born: January 12, 1993 (age 32); Helsinki, Finland
- Height: 6 ft 1 in (185 cm)
- Weight: 205 lb (93 kg; 14 st 9 lb)
- Position: Forward
- Shoots: Left
- SHL team Former teams: Luleå HF; KalPa; HPK; Lukko; KooKoo; Tappara; Kiekko-Espoo
- NHL draft: Undrafted
- Playing career: 2013–present

Heikki Liedes (born January 12, 1993) is a Finnish professional ice hockey player. He is currently playing with Luleå HF in the Swedish Hockey League (SHL).

Liedes made his Liiga debut playing with KalPa during the 2013–14 Liiga season.

After spending the first 12 professional seasons of his career in the Liiga, Liedes as a free agent was signed to a one-year contract with Swedish champions, Luleå HF of the SHL, for the 2025–26 season on 30 May 2025.
