= 2011 Stanley Cup playoffs =

Tournament details
- Dates: April 13 – June 15, 2011
- Teams: 16
- Defending champions: Chicago Blackhawks

Final positions
- Champions: Boston Bruins
- Runners-up: Vancouver Canucks

Tournament statistics
- Scoring leader(s): David Krejci (Bruins) (23 points)

Awards
- MVP: Tim Thomas (Bruins)

The 2011 Stanley Cup playoffs was the playoff tournament of the National Hockey League (NHL) for the 2010–11 season. It began on April 13, 2011, after the conclusion of the regular season. The first game of the Stanley Cup Final between the Vancouver Canucks and Boston Bruins was held on June 1, and Boston went on to capture their first Stanley Cup championship since 1972 (sixth overall) in the deciding seventh game on June 15.

The Canucks made the playoffs as the Presidents' Trophy winners with the most points (i.e. best record) during the regular season. The Detroit Red Wings increased their post-season appearance streak to twenty seasons, the longest active streak at the time. The New Jersey Devils missed the playoffs for the first time since 1996, ending their 13-year run of consecutive postseason appearances, the second longest streak at the time. This was the last time the Buffalo Sabres made the playoffs until 2026, where they would go on to have the all-time record for the longest playoff appearance drought. This was also the last time that the Florida Panthers missed the playoffs during their 10-season drought, which was previously the all-time longest drought from the tournament. For the first time since the 1978 Stanley Cup playoffs only two Canadian teams made the playoffs: the Montreal Canadiens and the Vancouver Canucks. For the first time in NHL history, all three California-based teams, the Los Angeles Kings, San Jose Sharks, and Anaheim Ducks, made the playoffs. San Jose went on to the Western Conference Final, marking the fifth time in eight seasons that a California-based team did so.

This season marked the only time that all six division champions advanced to the second round, as the NHL has since reverted to a four-division alignment. For the first time in the history of major professional sports in North America, two different teams came back from a 3–0 deficit to tie a series, with the Chicago Blackhawks forcing game seven against the Vancouver Canucks in the first round, and the Detroit Red Wings doing the same against the San Jose Sharks in the second round (both lost). Previously, only the 1975 New York Islanders came back from two 3–0 series deficits in the same season (winning one).

By winning game seven of the Stanley Cup Final, Boston became the first team to win three game sevens in one year, a feat that has since been matched by the 2014 Los Angeles Kings. They also became the second team in three seasons (and only the third team in NHL history) to win the Stanley Cup after losing the first two games of the Finals on the road. Vancouver remained the only team without a Stanley Cup to reach game seven of the Finals, as they also lost game seven of their previous Finals appearance in 1994.

Bruins goaltender Tim Thomas won the Conn Smythe Trophy as the most valuable player during the playoffs. Bruins forward David Krejci led all playoff scorers with 23 points in 25 games.

== Playoff seeds ==
The top eight teams in each conference qualified for the playoffs. The top three seeds in each conference were awarded to the division winners; while the five remaining spots were awarded to the highest finishers in their respective conferences.

The following teams qualified for the playoffs:

=== Eastern Conference ===
1. Washington Capitals, Southeast Division champions, Eastern Conference regular season champions – 107 points
2. Philadelphia Flyers, Atlantic Division champions – 106 points (44 ROWs)
3. Boston Bruins, Northeast Division champions – 103 points
4. Pittsburgh Penguins – 106 points (39 ROWs)
5. Tampa Bay Lightning – 103 points
6. Montreal Canadiens – 96 points (41 ROWs)
7. Buffalo Sabres – 96 points (38 ROWs)
8. New York Rangers – 93 points

=== Western Conference ===
1. Vancouver Canucks, Northwest Division champions, Western Conference regular season champions, Presidents' Trophy winners – 117 points
2. San Jose Sharks, Pacific Division champions – 105 points
3. Detroit Red Wings, Central Division champions – 104 points
4. Anaheim Ducks – 99 points (43 ROWs)
5. Nashville Predators – 99 points (38 ROWs, 4 points head-to-head vs. Phoenix, +25 goal differential)
6. Phoenix Coyotes – 99 points (38 ROWs, 4 points head-to-head vs. Nashville, +5 goal differential)
7. Los Angeles Kings – 98 points
8. Chicago Blackhawks – 97 points

== Playoff bracket ==
In each round, teams competed in a best-of-seven series following a 2–2–1–1–1 format (scores in the bracket indicate the number of games won in each best-of-seven series). The team with home ice advantage played at home for games one and two (and games five and seven, if necessary), and the other team played at home for games three and four (and game six, if necessary). The top eight teams in each conference made the playoffs, with the three division winners seeded 1–3 based on regular season record, and the five remaining teams seeded 4–8.

The NHL used "re-seeding" instead of a fixed bracket playoff system. During the first three rounds, the highest remaining seed in each conference was matched against the lowest remaining seed, the second-highest remaining seed played the second-lowest remaining seed, and so forth. The higher-seeded team was awarded home ice advantage. The two conference winners then advanced to the Stanley Cup Final, where home ice advantage was awarded to the team that had the better regular season record.

Conference quarterfinals | Conference semifinals
1 | Washington | 4
8 | NY Rangers | 1
1 | Washington | 0
5 | Tampa Bay | 4
2 | Philadelphia | 4
7 | Buffalo | 3
Eastern Conference
3 | Boston | 4
6 | Montreal | 3
2 | Philadelphia | 0
3 | Boston | 4
4 | Pittsburgh | 3
5 | Tampa Bay | 4
1 | Vancouver | 4
8 | Chicago | 3
1 | Vancouver | 4
5 | Nashville | 2
2 | San Jose | 4
7 | Los Angeles | 2
Western Conference
3 | Detroit | 4
6 | Phoenix | 0
2 | San Jose | 4
3 | Detroit | 3
4 | Anaheim | 2
5 | Nashville | 4

Conference finals
5 | Tampa Bay | 3
3 | Boston | 4
1 | Vancouver | 4
2 | San Jose | 1

Stanley Cup Final
E3 | Boston | 4
W1 | Vancouver | 3

== Conference quarterfinals ==
=== Eastern Conference quarterfinals ===
==== (1) Washington Capitals vs. (8) New York Rangers ====
The Washington Capitals entered the playoffs as the Eastern Conference regular season champions, earning 107 points. The New York Rangers narrowly qualified for the postseason as the eighth seed with 93 points after narrowly missing the playoffs entirely the previous year. This was the sixth playoff series between the two franchises; Washington had won three of the previous five meetings between these teams. The two teams last met in the 2009 Eastern Conference quarterfinals, in which the Capitals defeated the Rangers in seven games. In the regular season series, the Rangers held a 3–1–0 record, winning the last three games by a combined score of 15–1,

The Capitals defeated the Rangers in five games. In game one, Capitals' forward and captain Alexander Ovechkin answered a Rangers goal by Matt Gilroy in the third period to tie the game 1–1, before Alexander Semin then scored late into overtime to give Washington a 1–0 series lead. In game two, Capitals goaltender Michael Neuvirth shut out the Rangers 2–0, with Jason Chimera and Jason Arnott potting goals for Washington in the second period for a 2–0 series lead. The Rangers would respond in game three with a victory at home by striking first and never trailing. After Washington tied the game twice, Brandon Dubinsky scored the game-winning goal late in regulation for a 3–2 win to cut the series lead to 2–1. The Rangers tried to even the series in game four with a trio of goals in the second period for a 3–0 lead, but Washington stormed back with their own trio of goals to tie the game 3–3, forcing overtime. The Capitals' Jason Chimera then scored the game-winning goal in double overtime for a 3–1 series advantage, in what is currently the Capitals' longest playoff game victory, lasting 92 minutes and 36 seconds. The series would finally end in game five back at Washington D.C., where the Capitals took an insurmountable 3–0 lead that resulted in a 3–1 victory after Wotjek Wolski scored New York's only goal with less than a minute remaining. The Rangers only scored eight goals in this series while the Capitals scored 13. This is currently the last series where the Capitals have defeated the Rangers, with the Rangers winning four straight series against Washington since then.

| April 13 | New York Rangers | 1–2 | OT | Washington Capitals | Verizon Center | Recap |
| No scoring | | First period | | No scoring |
| No scoring | | Second period | | No scoring |
| Matt Gilroy (1) – 01:56 | | Third period | | 13:44 – Alexander Ovechkin (1) |
| No scoring | | First overtime period | | 18:24 – Alexander Semin (1) |
| Henrik Lundqvist 31 saves / 33 shots | | Goalie stats | | Michal Neuvirth 24 saves / 25 shots |

| April 15 | New York Rangers | 0–2 | Washington Capitals | Verizon Center | Recap |
| No scoring | | First period | No scoring |
| No scoring | | Second period | 02:11 – Jason Chimera (1); 04:08 – pp – Jason Arnott (1) |
| No scoring | | Third period | No scoring |
| Henrik Lundqvist 16 saves / 18 shots | | Goalie stats | Michal Neuvirth 22 saves / 22 shots |

| April 17 | Washington Capitals | 2–3 | New York Rangers | Madison Square Garden | Recap |
| No scoring | | First period | No scoring |
| Alexander Ovechkin (2) – 19:00 | | Second period | 05:30 – pp – Erik Christensen (1) |
| Mike Knuble (1) – pp – 14:48 | | Third period | 08:01 – Vaclav Prospal (1); 18:21 – Brandon Dubinsky (1) |
| Michal Neuvirth 32 saves / 35 shots | | Goalie stats | Henrik Lundqvist 23 saves / 25 shots |

| April 20 | Washington Capitals | 4–3 | 2OT | New York Rangers | Madison Square Garden | Recap |
| No scoring | | First period | | No scoring |
| No scoring | | Second period | | 05:24 – Artem Anisimov (1); 13:40 – Marian Gaborik (1); 13:47 – Brandon Dubinsky (2) |
| Alexander Semin (2) – 02:47; Marcus Johansson (1) – 03:44; Marcus Johansson (2) – 12:07 | | Third period | | No scoring |
| Jason Chimera (2) – 12:36 | | Second overtime period | | No scoring |
| Michal Neuvirth 36 saves / 39 shots | | Goalie stats | | Henrik Lundqvist 49 saves / 53 shots |

| April 23 | New York Rangers | 1–3 | Washington Capitals | Verizon Center | Recap |
| No scoring | | First period | 05:59 – pp – Mike Green (1) |
| No scoring | | Second period | 07:04 – Alexander Ovechkin (3) |
| Wojtek Wolski (1) – 19:28 | | Third period | 16:23 – Alexander Semin (3) |
| Henrik Lundqvist 24 saves / 27 shots | | Goalie stats | Michal Neuvirth 26 saves / 27 shots |

| Washington won series 4–1 |

==== (2) Philadelphia Flyers vs. (7) Buffalo Sabres ====
The Philadelphia Flyers entered the playoffs as the second seed in the Eastern Conference after winning the Atlantic Division with 106 points, winning the tiebreaker over the Pittsburgh Penguins on regulation + overtime wins (44 to 39). The Buffalo Sabres earned the seventh seed with 96 points, losing the tiebreaker to Montreal in regulation + overtime wins (41 to 38). This was the ninth playoff meeting between these two teams; Philadelphia had won five of the eight previous playoff series. They last met in the 2006 Eastern Conference quarterfinals, which ended with Buffalo defeating Philadelphia in six games.

The series started out with a 1–0 shutout victory for Buffalo Sabres goaltender Ryan Miller in game one, while Philadelphia came back to win games two and three. Miller got another 1–0 shutout victory in game four to tie the series at 2–2. In game five, Buffalo was up 3–0 at the end of the first period, but Philadelphia scored three goals to send the game to overtime. However, Tyler Ennis of Buffalo would score the overtime winner. In game six, Buffalo looked in good position to win after being up 3–1 after the first period, but Philadelphia rallied back, winning the game 5–4 on Ville Leino's overtime winner. In game seven, Philadelphia went up 4–0 about two minutes into the third period on a goal by Leino. Philadelphia ended up winning the game by a score of 5–2, winning the series four games to three. This was the last time the Sabres appeared in the playoffs until 2026.

| April 14 | Buffalo Sabres | 1–0 | Philadelphia Flyers | Wells Fargo Center | Recap |
| No scoring | | First period | No scoring |
| No scoring | | Second period | No scoring |
| Patrick Kaleta (1) – 05:56 | | Third period | No scoring |
| Ryan Miller 35 saves / 35 shots | | Goalie stats | Sergei Bobrovsky 24 saves / 25 shots |

| April 16 | Buffalo Sabres | 4–5 | Philadelphia Flyers | Wells Fargo Center | Recap |
| Thomas Vanek (1) – pp – 06:43; Thomas Vanek (2) – pp – 09:43; Andrej Sekera (1) – 12:30 | | First period | 04:00 – Claude Giroux (1); 07:20 – Daniel Carcillo (1); 13:14 – James van Riemsdyk (1) |
| No scoring | | Second period | 13:36 – pp – Ville Leino (1); 15:27 – Daniel Briere (1) |
| Cody McCormick (1) – 06:12 | | Third period | No scoring |
| Ryan Miller 29 saves / 34 shots | | Goalie stats | Sergei Bobrovsky 4 saves / 7 shots Brian Boucher 20 saves / 21 shots |

| April 18 | Philadelphia Flyers | 4–2 | Buffalo Sabres | HSBC Arena | Recap |
| Jeff Carter (1) – pp – 04:42 | | First period | 11:55 – pp – Drew Stafford (1) |
| Daniel Briere (2) – 02:44; Nikolay Zherdev (1) – 16:44 | | Second period | 18:12 – Nathan Gerbe (1) |
| Kimmo Timonen (1) – en – 19:42 | | Third period | No scoring |
| Brian Boucher 35 saves / 37 shots | | Goalie stats | Ryan Miller 22 saves / 25 shots |

| April 20 | Philadelphia Flyers | 0–1 | Buffalo Sabres | HSBC Arena | Recap |
| No scoring | | First period | 09:38 – Jason Pominville (1) |
| No scoring | | Second period | No scoring |
| No scoring | | Third period | No scoring |
| Brian Boucher 28 saves / 29 shots | | Goalie stats | Ryan Miller 32 saves / 32 shots |

| April 22 | Buffalo Sabres | 4–3 | OT | Philadelphia Flyers | Wells Fargo Center | Recap |
| Tyler Ennis (1) – 02:24; Thomas Vanek (3) – 03:51; Marc-Andre Gragnani (1) – pp – 15:36 | | First period | | No scoring |
| No scoring | | Second period | | 08:12 – James van Riemsdyk (2); 09:57 – Andrej Meszaros (1) |
| No scoring | | Third period | | 03:36 – Daniel Briere (3) |
| Tyler Ennis (2) – 05:31 | | First overtime period | | No scoring |
| Ryan Miller 36 saves / 39 shots | | Goalie stats | | Brian Boucher 8 saves / 11 shots Michael Leighton 20 saves / 21 shots |

| April 24 | Philadelphia Flyers | 5–4 | OT | Buffalo Sabres | HSBC Arena | Recap |
| Daniel Briere (4) – 14:53 | | First period | | 02:13 – Rob Niedermayer (1); 08:41 – pp – Thomas Vanek (4); 19:27 – pp – Thomas Vanek (5) |
| James van Riemsdyk (3) – 00:49; Daniel Briere – pp – 08:43 | | Second period | | 16:09 – Nathan Gerbe (2) |
| Scott Hartnell (1) – 10:43 | | Third period | | No scoring |
| Ville Leino (2) – 04:43 | | First overtime period | | No scoring |
| Michael Leighton 5 saves / 8 shots Brian Boucher 24 saves / 25 shots | | Goalie stats | | Ryan Miller 44 saves / 49 shots |

| April 26 | Buffalo Sabres | 2–5 | Philadelphia Flyers | Wells Fargo Center | Recap |
| No scoring | | First period | 19:41 – Braydon Coburn (1) |
| No scoring | | Second period | 04:45 – pp – Daniel Briere (6); 10:19 – pp – Claude Giroux (2) |
| Tyler Myers (1) – 06:33; Brad Boyes (1) – pp – 15:21 | | Third period | 01:59 – Ville Leino (3); 10:03 – Daniel Carcillo (2) |
| Ryan Miller 24 saves / 28 shots Jhonas Enroth 7 saves / 8 shots | | Goalie stats | Brian Boucher 26 saves / 28 shots |

| Philadelphia won series 4–3 |

==== (3) Boston Bruins vs. (6) Montreal Canadiens ====
The Boston Bruins entered the playoffs as the third seed in the Eastern Conference after winning the Northeast Division with 103 points. The Montreal Canadiens earned the sixth seed with 96 points, winning the tiebreaker over Buffalo in regulation + overtime wins (41 to 38). One of the greatest rivalries in North American professional sports, this was the 33rd meeting of these teams in the postseason, which is the most frequent playoff series in NHL history. Montreal had a record of 24–8 against Boston in the 32 previous series played by the franchises, winning 18 straight between 1946 and 1987. Boston had only beaten Montreal en route to winning the championship once before, in 1929. The most recent meeting of these teams in the postseason was in the 2009 Eastern Conference quarterfinals, which ended with Boston sweeping Montreal.

During the 2010–11 season, Montreal won four of six meetings. The February 9 game in which Boston won 8–6 featured six fights, a goalie fight, and a total of 187 penalty minutes. The March 8 game, where the Canadiens beat the Bruins 4–1, was marred when the Bruins' Zdeno Chara checked Habs' Max Pacioretty into the glass, and the resulting injury ended Pacioretty's season. The NHL did not suspend Chara for the hit, however Montreal Police opened a criminal investigation into the incident.

In this series, the Boston Bruins dropped their first two games at home, but came back to hang on to a game three victory in Montreal. In game four, Andrei Kostitsyn gave the Montreal Canadiens a 3–1 lead, which they couldn't take advantage of, falling 5–4 on an overtime goal by former Montreal Canadien Michael Ryder. In game five, Boston's Michael Ryder made a miraculous glove save while teammate and goaltender Tim Thomas was out of position, and the contest went into double overtime for Nathan Horton to win it 2–1 for Boston. In game six, Montreal scored twice on 5-on-3 power plays and won it 2–1. Game seven was also forced into overtime, where Nathan Horton again won the game 4–3 and sent the Bruins to the second round of the playoffs. Boston became the first team to win a seven-game post-season series despite being held scoreless on the power play.

On April 10, the scheduled date of the French-language Canadian federal election debate between party leaders was changed from April 14 to April 13 so it would not conflict with game one of the series. Games six and seven were played back-to-back due to a Lady Gaga concert, held on April 25 at the Bell Centre, and the requirement that the first round of the playoffs end by April 27.

This was Montreal's first game seven loss since 1994, also against the Bruins, and their last to date.

| April 14 | Montreal Canadiens | 2–0 | Boston Bruins | TD Garden | Recap |
| Brian Gionta (1) – 02:44 | | First period | No scoring |
| No scoring | | Second period | No scoring |
| Brian Gionta (2) – 16:42 | | Third period | No scoring |
| Carey Price 31 saves / 31 shots | | Goalie stats | Tim Thomas 18 saves / 20 shots |

| April 16 | Montreal Canadiens | 3–1 | Boston Bruins | TD Garden | Recap |
| Michael Cammalleri (1) – 00:43; Mathieu Darche (1) – pp – 02:20 | | First period | No scoring |
| Yannick Weber (1) – 17:21 | | Second period | 07:38 – Patrice Bergeron (1) |
| No scoring | | Third period | No scoring |
| Carey Price 34 saves / 35 shots | | Goalie stats | Tim Thomas 23 saves / 26 shots |

| April 18 | Boston Bruins | 4–2 | Montreal Canadiens | Bell Centre | Recap |
| David Krejci (1) – 03:11; Nathan Horton (1) – 14:38 | | First period | No scoring |
| Rich Peverley (1) – 02:02 | | Second period | 07:03 – Andrei Kostitsyn (1) |
| Chris Kelly (1) – en – 19:34 | | Third period | 04:08 – Tomas Plekanec (1) |
| Tim Thomas 34 saves / 36 shots | | Goalie stats | Carey Price 21 saves / 24 shots |

| April 21 | Boston Bruins | 5–4 | OT | Montreal Canadiens | Bell Centre | Recap |
| No scoring | | First period | | 08:13 – Brent Sopel (1) |
| Michael Ryder (1) – 02:13; Andrew Ference (1) – 09:59; Patrice Bergeron (2) – 17:04 | | Second period | | 06:52 – Michael Cammalleri (2); 07:47 – Andrei Kostitsyn (2) |
| Chris Kelly (2) – 13:42 | | Third period | | 01:39 – pp – P. K. Subban (1) |
| Michael Ryder (2) – 01:59 | | First overtime period | | No scoring |
| Tim Thomas 34 saves / 38 shots | | Goalie stats | | Carey Price 30 saves / 35 shots |

| April 23 | Montreal Canadiens | 1–2 | 2OT | Boston Bruins | TD Garden | Recap |
| No scoring | | First period | | No scoring |
| No scoring | | Second period | | No scoring |
| Jeff Halpern (1) – 13:56 | | Third period | | 04:33 – Brad Marchand (1) |
| No scoring | | Second overtime period | | 09:03 – Nathan Horton (2) |
| Carey Price 49 saves / 51 shots | | Goalie stats | | Tim Thomas 44 saves / 45 shots |

| April 26 | Boston Bruins | 1–2 | Montreal Canadiens | Bell Centre | Recap |
| No scoring | | First period | 10:07 – pp – Michael Cammalleri (3) |
| Dennis Seidenberg (1) – 00:48 | | Second period | 05:48 – pp – Brian Gionta (3) |
| No scoring | | Third period | No scoring |
| Tim Thomas 25 saves / 27 shots | | Goalie stats | Carey Price 31 saves / 32 shots |

| April 27 | Montreal Canadiens | 3–4 | OT | Boston Bruins | TD Garden | Recap |
| Yannick Weber (2) – pp – 09:49 | | First period | | 03:31 – Johnny Boychuk (1); 05:33 – Mark Recchi (1) |
| Tomas Plekanec (2) – sh – 05:50 | | Second period | | No scoring |
| P. K. Subban (2) – pp – 18:03 | | Third period | | 09:44 – Chris Kelly (3) |
| No scoring | | First overtime period | | 05:43 – Nathan Horton (3) |
| Carey Price 30 saves / 34 shots | | Goalie stats | | Tim Thomas 34 saves / 37 shots |

| Boston won series 4–3 |

==== (4) Pittsburgh Penguins vs. (5) Tampa Bay Lightning ====
The Pittsburgh Penguins entered the playoffs as the fourth overall seed in the Eastern Conference with 106 points, losing the tiebreaker for the Atlantic Division title to the Philadelphia Flyers on regulation + overtime wins (39 to 44). The Tampa Bay Lightning earned 103 points during the regular season to finish fifth overall in the Eastern Conference. This was the first playoff series between these two teams.

To start the series, Penguins goaltender Marc-Andre Fleury shut-out Tampa Bay 3–0 in game one, with the Lightning responding with a 5–1 win in game two. Unfortunately for the Lightning, they dropped games three and four (game four in double overtime), only to answer with a huge 8–2 victory in Pittsburgh, forcing a game six at home that ended 4–2 in favour of Tampa Bay. In game seven, Lightning forward Sean Bergenheim scored about five minutes into the second period. The Lightning managed to hold on to that 1–0 lead, advancing to the Eastern Conference semifinals.

| April 13 | Tampa Bay Lightning | 0–3 | Pittsburgh Penguins | Consol Energy Center | Recap |
| No scoring | | First period | No scoring |
| No scoring | | Second period | No scoring |
| No scoring | | Third period | 06:05 – Alexei Kovalev (1); 06:23 – Arron Asham (1); 19:18 – en – Chris Kunitz (1) |
| Dwayne Roloson 37 saves / 39 shots | | Goalie stats | Marc-Andre Fleury 32 saves / 32 shots |

| April 15 | Tampa Bay Lightning | 5–1 | Pittsburgh Penguins | Consol Energy Center | Recap |
| Eric Brewer (1) – 02:02; Vincent Lecavalier (1) – pp – 06:53; Nate Thompson (1) – 17:02 | | First period | No scoring |
| Martin St. Louis (1) – pp – 19:46 | | Second period | 09:08 – Craig Adams (1) |
| Mattias Ohlund (1) – en – 17:55 | | Third period | No scoring |
| Dwayne Roloson 35 saves / 36 shots | | Goalie stats | Marc-Andre Fleury 16 saves / 20 shots |

| April 18 | Pittsburgh Penguins | 3–2 | Tampa Bay Lightning | St. Pete Times Forum | Recap |
| Maxime Talbot (1) – 05:46; Arron Asham (2) – 06:31 | | First period | 15:19 – pp – Martin St. Louis (2) |
| No scoring | | Second period | No scoring |
| Tyler Kennedy (1) – 02:43 | | Third period | 02:12 – pp – Martin St. Louis (3) |
| Marc-Andre Fleury 25 saves / 27 shots | | Goalie stats | Dwayne Roloson 27 saves / 30 shots |

| April 20 | Pittsburgh Penguins | 3–2 | 2OT | Tampa Bay Lightning | St. Pete Times Forum | Recap |
| Tyler Kennedy (2) – pp – 08:14 | | First period | | No scoring |
| Arron Asham (3) – 02:39 | | Second period | | 17:14 – pp – Martin St. Louis (4) |
| No scoring | | Third period | | 16:43 – Sean Bergenheim (1) |
| James Neal (1) – 03:38 | | Second overtime period | | No scoring |
| Marc-Andre Fleury 29 saves / 31 shots | | Goalie stats | | Dwayne Roloson 50 saves / 53 shots |

| April 23 | Tampa Bay Lightning | 8–2 | Pittsburgh Penguins | Consol Energy Center | Recap |
| Simon Gagne (1) – 16:57; Steven Stamkos (1) – 17:43 | | First period | No scoring |
| Vincent Lecavalier (2) – 01:55; Simon Gagne (2) – 05:31; Steven Stamkos (2) – pp – 07:00 | | Second period | No scoring |
| Pavel Kubina (1) – pp – 02:54; Pavel Kubina (2) – pp – 05:45; Dominic Moore – pp – 15:35 | | Third period | 06:36 – Michael Rupp (1); 08:22 – Chris Conner (1) |
| Dwayne Roloson 31 saves / 33 shots | | Goalie stats | Marc-Andre Fleury 10 saves / 14 shots Brent Johnson 7 saves / 11 shots |

| April 25 | Pittsburgh Penguins | 2–4 | Tampa Bay Lightning | St. Pete Times Forum | Recap |
| Pascal Dupuis (1) – 08:23 | | First period | 16:36 – Teddy Purcell (1) |
| No scoring | | Second period | 05:44 – Sean Bergenheim (2) |
| Jordan Staal (1) – 03:48 | | Third period | 04:55 – Steve Downie (1); 09:34 – Ryan Malone (1) |
| Marc-Andre Fleury 17 saves / 21 shots | | Goalie stats | Dwayne Roloson 27 saves / 29 shots |

| April 27 | Tampa Bay Lightning | 1–0 | Pittsburgh Penguins | Consol Energy Center | Recap |
| No scoring | | First period | No scoring |
| Sean Bergenheim (3) – 05:41 | | Second period | No scoring |
| No scoring | | Third period | No scoring |
| Dwayne Roloson 36 saves / 36 shots | | Goalie stats | Marc-Andre Fleury 22 saves / 23 shots |

| Tampa Bay won series 4–3 |

=== Western Conference quarterfinals ===
==== (1) Vancouver Canucks vs. (8) Chicago Blackhawks ====
The Vancouver Canucks entered the playoffs as the Western Conference regular season champions and Presidents' Trophy winners, earning 117 points. The Chicago Blackhawks, the defending Stanley Cup champions, barely qualified for the post-season as the eighth and final seed with 97 points. This was the third consecutive year that Vancouver and Chicago met in the playoffs. Chicago previously eliminated Vancouver in the second round in both 2009 and 2010; both of those series went to six games.

The Canucks defeated the defending Stanley Cup champion Blackhawks in seven games. After losing the first three games of the series, Chicago won the next three. This was the seventh time in NHL history that a team forced a seventh game after trailing 3–0 in a playoff series. However, Vancouver won the seventh game in overtime to avoid becoming the fourth team in NHL history (and first Presidents' Trophy winning team) to lose a series after initially taking a 3–0 series lead.

| April 13 | Chicago Blackhawks | 0–2 | Vancouver Canucks | Rogers Arena | Recap |
| No scoring | | First period | 07:03 – Chris Higgins (1); 10:23 – Jannik Hansen (1) |
| No scoring | | Second period | No scoring |
| No scoring | | Third period | No scoring |
| Corey Crawford 31 saves / 33 shots | | Goalie stats | Roberto Luongo 32 saves / 32 shots |

| April 15 | Chicago Blackhawks | 3–4 | Vancouver Canucks | Rogers Arena | Recap |
| No scoring | | First period | 07:30 – Jannik Hansen (2) |
| Ben Smith (1) – 14:50 | | Second period | 00:30 – pp – Daniel Sedin (1); 19:46 – Alexander Edler (1) |
| Viktor Stalberg (1) – 01:56; Ben Smith (2) – 12:50 | | Third period | 10:06 – Daniel Sedin (2) |
| Corey Crawford 23 saves / 27 shots | | Goalie stats | Roberto Luongo 23 saves / 26 shots |

| April 17 | Vancouver Canucks | 3–2 | Chicago Blackhawks | United Center | Recap |
| No scoring | | First period | 06:54 – pp – Duncan Keith (1) |
| Christian Ehrhoff (1) – pp – 10:03; Daniel Sedin (3) – 10:57 | | Second period | 12:40 – pp – Patrick Sharp (1) |
| Mikael Samuelsson (1) – 06:48 | | Third period | No scoring |
| Roberto Luongo 30 saves / 32 shots | | Goalie stats | Corey Crawford 23 saves / 26 shots |

| April 19 | Vancouver Canucks | 2–7 | Chicago Blackhawks | United Center | Recap |
| Sami Salo (1) – pp – 04:46 | | First period | 01:43 – Bryan Bickell (1) |
| No scoring | | Second period | 05:18 – Brian Campbell (1); 05:35 – Duncan Keith (2); 14:45 – Dave Bolland (1); 18:57 – Michael Frolik (1) |
| Daniel Sedin (4) – pp – 16:24 | | Third period | 02:49 – pp – Patrick Sharp (2); 13:21 – pp – Patrick Sharp (3) |
| Roberto Luongo 22 saves / 28 shots Cory Schneider 6 saves / 7 shots | | Goalie stats | Corey Crawford 21 saves / 23 shots |

| April 21 | Chicago Blackhawks | 5–0 | Vancouver Canucks | Rogers Arena | Recap |
| Marian Hossa (1) – pp – 05:54; Duncan Keith (3) – 06:18; Patrick Kane (1) – 12:17 | | First period | No scoring |
| Marian Hossa (2) – 01:26; Duncan Keith (4) – 04:47 | | Second period | No scoring |
| No scoring | | Third period | No scoring |
| Corey Crawford 36 saves / 36 shots | | Goalie stats | Roberto Luongo 8 saves / 12 shots Cory Schneider 13 saves / 14 shots |

| April 24 | Vancouver Canucks | 3–4 | OT | Chicago Blackhawks | United Center | Recap |
| Daniel Sedin (5) – 02:06; Alex Burrows (1) – 18:48 | | First period | | 14:57 – Bryan Bickell (2) |
| No scoring | | Second period | | 15:08 – Dave Bolland (2) |
| Kevin Bieksa (1) – 00:58 | | Third period | | 02:31 – ps – Michael Frolik (2) |
| No scoring | | First overtime period | | 15:30 – Ben Smith (3) |
| Cory Schneider 17 saves / 20 shots Roberto Luongo 12 saves / 13 shots | | Goalie stats | | Corey Crawford 32 saves / 35 shots |

| April 26 | Chicago Blackhawks | 1–2 | OT | Vancouver Canucks | Rogers Arena | Recap |
| No scoring | | First period | | 02:43 – Alex Burrows (2) |
| No scoring | | Second period | | No scoring |
| Jonathan Toews (1) – sh – 18:04 | | Third period | | No scoring |
| No scoring | | First overtime period | | 05:22 – Alex Burrows (3) |
| Corey Crawford 36 saves / 38 shots | | Goalie stats | | Roberto Luongo 31 saves / 32 shots |

| Vancouver won series 4–3 |

==== (2) San Jose Sharks vs. (7) Los Angeles Kings ====
The San Jose Sharks entered the playoffs as the second seed in the Western Conference after winning the Pacific Division with 105 points. The Los Angeles Kings earned the seventh seed with 98 points. This was the first meeting of these teams in the post-season.

The series started out with a bang in game one, with Dany Heatley scoring only 28 seconds into the game. That game was later on won by Joe Pavelski in overtime, but a good response by the Kings in game two gave them a 4–0 shutout victory in San Jose. In game three, San Jose became the fifth team in NHL playoff history to win a game after facing a 4–0 deficit, where Devin Setoguchi of San Jose scored the game-winning goal in overtime, to make the final score 6–5. Still at home, Los Angeles lost game four by a score of 6–3. In game five, at San Jose, Los Angeles would win by a score of 3–1. However, that would not be enough, as Joe Thornton of San Jose scored the game-winning goal in overtime of game six to eliminate Los Angeles from the playoffs.

| April 14 | Los Angeles Kings | 2–3 | OT | San Jose Sharks | HP Pavilion | Recap |
| No scoring | | First period | | 00:28 – Dany Heatley (1) |
| Dustin Brown (1) – pp – 07:25; Justin Williams (1) – 16:20 | | Second period | | 10:23 – Logan Couture (1) |
| No scoring | | Third period | | No scoring |
| No scoring | | First overtime period | | 14:44 – Joe Pavelski (1) |
| Jonathan Quick 42 saves / 45 shots | | Goalie stats | | Antti Niemi 33 saves / 35 shots |

| April 16 | Los Angeles Kings | 4–0 | San Jose Sharks | HP Pavilion | Recap |
| Jack Johnson (1) – pp – 12:13; Drew Doughty (1) – pp – 15:43 | | First period | No scoring |
| Drew Doughty (2) – 15:42 | | Second period | No scoring |
| Kyle Clifford (1) – 04:54 | | Third period | No scoring |
| Jonathan Quick 34 saves / 34 shots | | Goalie stats | Antti Niemi 19 saves / 23 shots |

| April 19 | San Jose Sharks | 6–5 | OT | Los Angeles Kings | Staples Center | Recap |
| No scoring | | First period | | 02:26 – Willie Mitchell (1); 02:39 – Kyle Clifford (2); 18:22 – Michal Handzus (1) |
| Patrick Marleau (1) – 03:08; Ryane Clowe (1) – pp – 06:53; Logan Couture (2) – 13:32; Ryane Clowe (2) – 18:35; Joe Pavelski (2) – 19:29 | | Second period | | 00:44 – Brad Richardson (1); 13:47 – Ryan Smyth (1) |
| No scoring | | Third period | | No scoring |
| Devin Setoguchi (1) – 03:09 | | First overtime period | | No scoring |
| Antti Niemi 6 saves / 10 shots Antero Niittymaki 11 saves / 12 shots | | Goalie stats | | Jonathan Quick 30 saves / 36 shots |

| April 21 | San Jose Sharks | 6–3 | Los Angeles Kings | Staples Center | Recap |
| No scoring | | First period | No scoring |
| Ryane Clowe (3) – 03:58; Jason Demers (1) – 05:12; Ryane Clowe (4) – pp – 09:28 | | Second period | 11:00 – Brad Richardson (2); 16:04 – Justin Williams (2) |
| Joe Thornton (1) – 02:28; Joe Pavelski (3) – 03:22; Torrey Mitchell (1) – 11:42 | | Third period | 13:11 – Alexei Ponikarovsky (1) |
| Antti Niemi 35 saves / 38 shots | | Goalie stats | Jonathan Quick 21 saves / 27 shots |

| April 23 | Los Angeles Kings | 3–1 | San Jose Sharks | HP Pavilion | Recap |
| Wayne Simmonds (1) – 03:36; Kyle Clifford (3) – 07:14; Dustin Penner (1) – 08:42 | | First period | No scoring |
| No scoring | | Second period | 05:43 – Patrick Marleau (2) |
| No scoring | | Third period | No scoring |
| Jonathan Quick 51 saves / 52 shots | | Goalie stats | Antti Niemi 1 save / 4 shots Antero Niittymaki 18 saves / 18 shots |

| April 25 | San Jose Sharks | 4–3 | OT | Los Angeles Kings | Staples Center | Recap |
| No scoring | | First period | | No scoring |
| Kyle Wellwood (1) – 02:58; Jason Demers (2) – 16:52 | | Second period | | 13:27 – pp – Justin Williams (3) |
| Dany Heatley (2) – 08:48 | | Third period | | 00:18 – Ryan Smyth (2); 11:39 – pp – Trevor Lewis (1) |
| Joe Thornton (2) – 02:22 | | First overtime period | | No scoring |
| Antti Niemi 26 saves / 29 shots | | Goalie stats | | Jonathan Quick 31 saves / 35 shots |

| San Jose won series 4–2 |

==== (3) Detroit Red Wings vs. (6) Phoenix Coyotes ====
The Detroit Red Wings entered the playoffs as the third seed in the Western Conference after winning the Central Division with 104 points. This was Detroit's 20th straight appearance in the postseason. The Phoenix Coyotes earned the sixth seed with 99 points, losing tiebreakers over the Anaheim Ducks and the Nashville Predators in total regulation + overtime wins (43 to 38). They also lost the tiebreaker to Nashville on goal differential (+25 to +5). This was a rematch of the previous year's Western Conference quarterfinals, in which Detroit defeated Phoenix in seven games.

The Red Wings had 13 different goal scorers in the series. This was the only sweep in the first round of the playoffs.

| April 13 | Phoenix Coyotes | 2–4 | Detroit Red Wings | Joe Louis Arena | Recap |
| Kyle Turris (1) – 02:16 | | First period | No scoring |
| No scoring | | Second period | 07:38 – Pavel Datsyuk (1); 12:02 – Johan Franzen (1); 18:16 – pp – Brian Rafalski (1) |
| Radim Vrbata (1) – 07:38 | | Third period | 03:16 – Jiri Hudler (1) |
| Ilya Bryzgalov 32 saves / 36 shots | | Goalie stats | Jimmy Howard 26 saves / 28 shots |

| April 16 | Phoenix Coyotes | 3–4 | Detroit Red Wings | Joe Louis Arena | Recap |
| No scoring | | First period | 10:42 – pp – Pavel Datsyuk (2); 15:50 – pp – Brian Rafalski (2); 19:01 – Darren Helm (1) |
| Radim Vrbata (2) – pp – 07:02 | | Second period | 01:11 – Tomas Holmstrom (1) |
| Shane Doan (1) – pp – 05:49; Shane Doan (2) – pp – 08:37 | | Third period | No scoring |
| Ilya Bryzgalov 27 saves / 31 shots | | Goalie stats | Jimmy Howard 30 saves / 33 shots |

| April 18 | Detroit Red Wings | 4–2 | Phoenix Coyotes | Jobing.com Arena | Recap |
| Ruslan Salei (1) – 01:57; Drew Miller (1) – 02:41 | | First period | No scoring |
| Valtteri Filppula (1) – 02:50 | | Second period | 11:43 – pp – David Schlemko (1) |
| Johan Franzen (2) – 00:45 | | Third period | 13:00 – pp – Ray Whitney (1) |
| Jimmy Howard 28 saves / 30 shots | | Goalie stats | Ilya Bryzgalov 30 saves / 34 shots |

| April 20 | Detroit Red Wings | 6–3 | Phoenix Coyotes | Jobing.com Arena | Recap |
| Tomas Holmstrom (2) – 03:47; Patrick Eaves (1) – 18:47 | | First period | 05:46 – Taylor Pyatt (1); 09:46 – Shane Doan (3) |
| Niklas Kronwall (1) – pp – 04:49 | | Second period | 01:09 – pp – Martin Hanzal (1) |
| Daniel Cleary (1) – 13:41; Todd Bertuzzi (1) – 15:34; Patrick Eaves (2) – en – 19:24 | | Third period | No scoring |
| Jimmy Howard 24 saves / 27 shots | | Goalie stats | Ilya Bryzgalov 34 saves / 39 shots |

| Detroit won series 4–0 |

==== (4) Anaheim Ducks vs. (5) Nashville Predators ====
The Anaheim Ducks entered the playoffs as the fourth overall seed in the Western Conference with 99 points, winning tiebreakers over the Nashville Predators and the Phoenix Coyotes in total regulation + overtime wins (43 to 38). The Nashville Predators also earned 99 points during the regular season to finish fifth overall. They lost the tiebreaker to Anaheim by having fewer games won in regulation + overtime (43 to 38) while winning the tiebreaker over the Phoenix Coyotes in goal differential (+25 to +5). This was the first playoff series between these two teams. Nick Spaling's second goal of the game early in the third period of game six gave the Predators the lead and they held on to win the game 4–2. This was Nashville's first playoff series victory in franchise history since entering the league in 1998.

| April 13 | Nashville Predators | 4–1 | Anaheim Ducks | Honda Center | Recap |
| Shea Weber (1) – pp – 04:13 | | First period | No scoring |
| Steve Sullivan (1) – 15:16; Mike Fisher (1) – 18:08 | | Second period | No scoring |
| Mike Fisher (2) – 00:56 | | Third period | 11:24 – pp – Teemu Selanne (1) |
| Pekka Rinne 27 saves / 28 shots | | Goalie stats | Dan Ellis 20 saves / 24 shots Ray Emery 6 saves / 6 shots |

| April 15 | Nashville Predators | 3–5 | Anaheim Ducks | Honda Center | Recap |
| No scoring | | First period | 05:24 – pp – Corey Perry (1); 06:02 – pp – Teemu Selanne (2) |
| Shea Weber (2) – pp – 04:29 | | Second period | 07:12 – Bobby Ryan (1); 15:54 – Ryan Getzlaf (1) |
| Patric Hornqvist (1) – pp – 01:30; Joel Ward (1) – 10:17 | | Third period | 19:07 – en – Bobby Ryan (2) |
| Pekka Rinne 23 saves / 27 shots | | Goalie stats | Ray Emery 31 saves / 34 shots |

| April 17 | Anaheim Ducks | 3–4 | Nashville Predators | Bridgestone Arena | Recap |
| No scoring | | First period | 15:00 – pp – Martin Erat (1); 15:38 – Jordin Tootoo (1) |
| Teemu Selanne (3) – pp – 18:10; Teemu Selanne (4) – 18:40 | | Second period | No scoring |
| Matt Beleskey (1) – 06:48 | | Third period | 05:25 – David Legwand (1); 10:21 – Mike Fisher (3) |
| Ray Emery 33 saves / 37 shots | | Goalie stats | Pekka Rinne 13 saves / 16 shots |

| April 20 | Anaheim Ducks | 6–3 | Nashville Predators | Bridgestone Arena | Recap |
| Cam Fowler (1) – pp – 04:41; Saku Koivu (1) – 05:14 | | First period | 05:45 – Patric Hornqvist (2) |
| Teemu Selanne (5) – pp – 11:41 | | Second period | 05:44 – pp – Joel Ward (2); 14:14 – Matthew Halischuk (1) |
| Corey Perry (2) – sh – 01:17; Ryan Getzlaf (2) – 04:51; Brandon McMillan (1) – 06:46 | | Third period | No scoring |
| Ray Emery 19 saves / 22 shots | | Goalie stats | Pekka Rinne 23 saves / 29 shots Anders Lindback 9 saves / 9 shots |

| April 22 | Nashville Predators | 4–3 | OT | Anaheim Ducks | Honda Center | Recap |
| Kevin Klein (1) – 08:32 | | First period | | No scoring |
| No scoring | | Second period | | 13:39 – pp – Jason Blake (1) |
| Joel Ward (3) – 11:20; Shea Weber (3) – 19:24 | | Third period | | 00:40 – Bobby Ryan (3); 14:16 – Jason Blake (2) |
| Jerred Smithson (1) – 01:57 | | First overtime period | | No scoring |
| Pekka Rinne 23 saves / 26 shots | | Goalie stats | | Ray Emery 33 saves / 37 shots |

| April 24 | Anaheim Ducks | 2–4 | Nashville Predators | Bridgestone Arena | Recap |
| Teemu Selanne (6) – 10:22 | | First period | 19:32 – Nick Spaling (1) |
| Jason Blake (3) – pp – 18:23 | | Second period | 03:29 – Steve Sullivan (2) |
| No scoring | | Third period | 04:43 – Nick Spaling (2); 19:50 – en – David Legwand (2) |
| Ray Emery 26 saves / 29 shots | | Goalie stats | Pekka Rinne 25 saves / 27 shots |

| Nashville won series 4–2 |

== Conference semifinals ==
=== Eastern Conference semifinals ===
==== (1) Washington Capitals vs. (5) Tampa Bay Lightning ====
This was the second playoff series between these two teams. Washington and Tampa Bay previously met in the 2003 Eastern Conference quarterfinals, where Tampa Bay defeated Washington in six games. In the six-game regular season series between these teams, Washington won four games (including one win in a shootout). In game one, Sean Bergenheim, the player with the winning goal in game seven against Pittsburgh, opened the scoring for Tampa Bay, but goals from Alexander Semin and Eric Fehr put Washington up 2–1, only for Tampa Bay to regain the lead and win with Steven Stamkos' late second period power play goal. Late in game two, Tampa Bay was up 2–1, when Capitals forward and captain Alexander Ovechkin received a pass from behind the net to tie the game at two, but in overtime, Tampa Bay forward and captain Vincent Lecavalier put in his second goal of the game to win it for Tampa Bay. Game three was a hard-fought game for Washington, after being up 3–2 to start the third period. However, Washington would ultimately lose game three by a score of 4–3. Washington would then lose game four by a score of 5–3, to fall to Tampa Bay in a 4–0 series sweep.

| April 29 | Tampa Bay Lightning | 4–2 | Washington Capitals | Verizon Center | Recap |
| Sean Bergenheim (4) – 02:12 | | First period | 04:08 – Alexander Semin (4) |
| Steve Downie (2) – 16:17; Steven Stamkos (3) – pp – 19:28 | | Second period | 01:51 – Eric Fehr (1) |
| Dominic Moore (2) – en – 19:20 | | Third period | No scoring |
| Dwayne Roloson 26 saves / 28 shots | | Goalie stats | Michal Neuvirth 20 saves / 23 shots |

| May 1 | Tampa Bay Lightning | 3–2 | OT | Washington Capitals | Verizon Center | Recap |
| Vincent Lecavalier (3) – pp – 19:01 | | First period | | No scoring |
| No scoring | | Second period | | 14:52 – Brooks Laich (1) |
| Martin St. Louis (5) – 07:35 | | Third period | | 18:52 – Alexander Ovechkin (4) |
| Vincent Lecavalier (4) – 06:19 | | First overtime period | | No scoring |
| Dwayne Roloson 35 saves / 37 shots | | Goalie stats | | Michal Neuvirth 20 saves / 23 shots |

| May 3 | Washington Capitals | 3–4 | Tampa Bay Lightning | St. Pete Times Forum | Recap |
| No scoring | | First period | 11:03 – Sean Bergenheim (5) |
| Mike Knuble (2) – 00:59; John Carlson (1) – 07:58; Alexander Ovechkin (5) – pp – 17:27 | | Second period | 11:51 – Vincent Lecavalier (5) |
| No scoring | | Third period | 05:23 – Steven Stamkos (4); 05:47 – Ryan Malone (2) |
| Michal Neuvirth 26 saves / 30 shots | | Goalie stats | Dwayne Roloson 29 saves / 32 shots |

| May 4 | Washington Capitals | 3–5 | Tampa Bay Lightning | St. Pete Times Forum | Recap |
| Marco Sturm (1) – pp – 18:30 | | First period | 12:37 – pp – Ryan Malone (3) |
| John Erskine (1) – 13:40 | | Second period | 04:41 – Sean Bergenheim (6); 12:34 – Sean Bergenheim (7) |
| John Carlson (2) – 17:54 | | Third period | 05:07 – pp – Marc-Andre Bergeron (1); 16:52 – Martin St. Louis (6) |
| Michal Neuvirth 32 saves / 37 shots | | Goalie stats | Dwayne Roloson 33 saves / 36 shots |

| Tampa Bay won series 4–0 |

==== (2) Philadelphia Flyers vs. (3) Boston Bruins ====
This was the sixth playoff series between these two teams. It was a rematch of the previous year's Eastern Conference semifinals, in which Philadelphia came back from a 3–0 series deficit to beat Boston in seven games. Boston swept Philadelphia out of the playoffs, avenging their blown 3–0 lead to move on to the Eastern Conference Final for the first time since 1992. This series featured some goaltending trouble for Philadelphia; Boston outscored Philadelphia 20–7 in four games. Brian Boucher started the first three games, but was pulled in all three: he was removed from games one and three due to performance, and he was briefly removed from game two due to injury. In all, Philadelphia started three different goaltenders in the 11 games that they played in the 2011 playoffs; six of those games featured a change of goalie.

| April 30 | Boston Bruins | 7–3 | Philadelphia Flyers | Wells Fargo Center | Recap |
| David Krejci (2) – 01:52; Nathan Horton (4) – 19:24 | | First period | 11:02 – Daniel Briere (7) |
| Mark Recchi (2) – 02:34; David Krejci (3) – 15:26; Brad Marchand (2) – 17:14 | | Second period | 17:30 – James van Riemsdyk (5) |
| Brad Marchand (3) – 14:59; Gregory Campbell (1) – 17:39 | | Third period | 13:02 – pp – Mike Richards (1) |
| Tim Thomas 31 saves / 34 shots | | Goalie stats | Brian Boucher 18 saves / 23 shots Sergei Bobrovsky 8 saves / 10 shots |

| May 2 | Boston Bruins | 3–2 | OT | Philadelphia Flyers | Wells Fargo Center | Recap |
| Chris Kelly (4) – 12:50; Brad Marchand (4) – 14:15 | | First period | | 00:29 – James van Riemsdyk (6); 09:31 – pp – James van Riemsdyk (7) |
| No scoring | | Second period | | No scoring |
| No scoring | | Third period | | No scoring |
| David Krejci (4) – 14:00 | | First overtime period | | No scoring |
| Tim Thomas 52 saves / 54 shots | | Goalie stats | | Brian Boucher 32 saves / 35 shots Sergei Bobrovsky 6 saves / 6 shots |

| May 4 | Philadelphia Flyers | 1–5 | Boston Bruins | TD Garden | Recap |
| No scoring | | First period | 00:30 – Zdeno Chara (1); 01:03 – David Krejci (5) |
| Andrej Meszaros (2) – 16:26 | | Second period | 13:39 – Daniel Paille (1); 15:14 – Nathan Horton (5) |
| No scoring | | Third period | 18:38 – pp – Zdeno Chara (2) |
| Brian Boucher 16 saves / 20 shots Sergei Bobrovsky 7 saves / 8 shots | | Goalie stats | Tim Thomas 37 saves / 38 shots |

| May 6 | Philadelphia Flyers | 1–5 | Boston Bruins | TD Garden | Recap |
| No scoring | | First period | 12:02 – pp – Milan Lucic (1) |
| Kris Versteeg (1) – 13:22 | | Second period | No scoring |
| No scoring | | Third period | 02:42 – Johnny Boychuk (2); 15:03 – Milan Lucic (2); 18:04 – en – Brad Marchand (5); 19:35 – en – Daniel Paille (2) |
| Sergei Bobrovsky 22 saves / 25 shots | | Goalie stats | Tim Thomas 22 saves / 23 shots |

| Boston won series 4–0 |

=== Western Conference semifinals ===
==== (1) Vancouver Canucks vs. (5) Nashville Predators ====
This was the first playoff series between these two teams. It was also the first time that the Nashville Predators played in the second round of the playoffs. Vancouver and Nashville had split the four-game regular season series between them. Vancouver won this series in six games to advance to the Conference finals for the first time since 1994. Each game in this series was decided by just a single goal (with the exception of an empty net goal scored by Vancouver captain Henrik Sedin in game four).

| April 28 | Nashville Predators | 0–1 | Vancouver Canucks | Rogers Arena | Recap |
| No scoring | | First period | No scoring |
| No scoring | | Second period | 12:14 – Chris Higgins (2) |
| No scoring | | Third period | No scoring |
| Pekka Rinne 29 saves / 30 shots | | Goalie stats | Roberto Luongo 20 saves / 20 shots |

| April 30 | Nashville Predators | 2–1 | 2OT | Vancouver Canucks | Rogers Arena | Recap |
| No scoring | | First period | | No scoring |
| No scoring | | Second period | | 02:00 – sh – Alex Burrows (4) |
| Ryan Suter (1) – 18:53 | | Third period | | No scoring |
| Matthew Halischuk (2) – 14:51 | | Second overtime period | | No scoring |
| Pekka Rinne 32 saves / 33 shots | | Goalie stats | | Roberto Luongo 44 saves / 46 shots |

| May 3 | Vancouver Canucks | 3–2 | OT | Nashville Predators | Bridgestone Arena | Recap |
| No scoring | | First period | | 10:18 – sh – David Legwand (3) |
| Ryan Kesler (1) – pp – 01:00 | | Second period | | No scoring |
| Chris Higgins (3) – 03:03 | | Third period | | 13:18 – Joel Ward (4) |
| Ryan Kesler (2) – pp – 10:45 | | First overtime period | | No scoring |
| Roberto Luongo 28 saves / 30 shots | | Goalie stats | | Pekka Rinne 44 saves / 47 shots |

| May 5 | Vancouver Canucks | 4–2 | Nashville Predators | Bridgestone Arena | Recap |
| Christian Ehrhoff (2) – 15:04 | | First period | 19:18 – pp – Joel Ward (5) |
| Alexander Edler (2) – 09:43 | | Second period | No scoring |
| Ryan Kesler (3) – pp – 07:28; Henrik Sedin (1) – en – 19:39 | | Third period | 03:27 – Cody Franson (1) |
| Roberto Luongo 19 saves / 21 shots | | Goalie stats | Pekka Rinne 24 saves / 27 shots |

| May 7 | Nashville Predators | 4–3 | Vancouver Canucks | Rogers Arena | Recap |
| David Legwand (4) – sh – 03:42 | | First period | 05:59 – Raffi Torres (1); 15:06 – Ryan Kesler (4) |
| David Legwand (5) – 00:51 | | Second period | No scoring |
| Joel Ward (6) – 01:14; Joel Ward (7) – 05:45 | | Third period | 16:14 – Ryan Kesler (5) |
| Pekka Rinne 31 saves / 34 shots | | Goalie stats | Roberto Luongo 19 saves / 23 shots |

| May 9 | Vancouver Canucks | 2–1 | Nashville Predators | Bridgestone Arena | Recap |
| Mason Raymond (1) – 07:45; Daniel Sedin (6) – pp – 09:28 | | First period | No scoring |
| No scoring | | Second period | 03:31 – David Legwand (6) |
| No scoring | | Third period | No scoring |
| Roberto Luongo 23 saves / 24 shots | | Goalie stats | Pekka Rinne 17 saves / 19 shots |

| Vancouver won series 4–2 |

==== (2) San Jose Sharks vs. (3) Detroit Red Wings ====
This was the fifth playoff series between these two teams. This was a rematch of the previous year's Western Conference semifinals, in which San Jose defeated Detroit in five games. After losing the first three games, Detroit won the next three, to force a seventh game. This was the eighth time this feat had been achieved in NHL history, the third time in the last two seasons, the second time in the 2011 playoffs, and the second time that the Red Wings had accomplished the feat. Chicago had accomplished the same feat against Vancouver in the conference quarterfinals, ultimately losing that series. Since the New York Islanders twice forced a game seven after being down 3–0 during the 1975 Stanley Cup playoffs, there had been 112 consecutive failed attempts to repeat that feat prior to the 2010 Stanley Cup playoffs, after which it has happened in three of the seven possible series. San Jose won the seventh game by a score of 3–2 to avoid becoming the fourth team in NHL history to lose a series after taking a 3–0 series lead. It allowed them their second consecutive trip to the conference finals. Six of the games were decided by only one goal; the only exception was a 3–1 win by Detroit in game six, in which Darren Helm of Detroit scored an empty net goal.

| April 29 | Detroit Red Wings | 1–2 | OT | San Jose Sharks | HP Pavilion | Recap |
| Nicklas Lidstrom (1) – 09:30 | | First period | | No scoring |
| No scoring | | Second period | | No scoring |
| No scoring | | Third period | | 10:22 – pp – Joe Pavelski (4) |
| No scoring | | First overtime period | | 07:03 – Benn Ferriero (1) |
| Jimmy Howard 44 saves / 46 shots | | Goalie stats | | Antti Niemi 24 saves / 25 shots |

| May 1 | Detroit Red Wings | 1–2 | San Jose Sharks | HP Pavilion | Recap |
| No scoring | | First period | 04:54 – pp – Ian White (1) |
| No scoring | | Second period | No scoring |
| Henrik Zetterberg (1) – pp – 13:58 | | Third period | 01:39 – Niclas Wallin (1) |
| Jimmy Howard 35 saves / 37 shots | | Goalie stats | Antti Niemi 33 saves / 34 shots |

| May 4 | San Jose Sharks | 4–3 | OT | Detroit Red Wings | Joe Louis Arena | Recap |
| Devin Setoguchi (2) – pp – 12:57 | | First period | | 19:38 – pp – Nicklas Lidstrom (2) |
| Devin Setoguchi (3) – pp – 14:49 | | Second period | | 13:59 – Patrick Eaves (3); 18:17 – pp – Pavel Datsyuk (3) |
| Dan Boyle (1) – 15:52 | | Third period | | No scoring |
| Devin Setoguchi (4) – 09:21 | | First overtime period | | No scoring |
| Antti Niemi 38 saves / 41 shots | | Goalie stats | | Jimmy Howard 34 saves / 38 shots |

| May 6 | San Jose Sharks | 3–4 | Detroit Red Wings | Joe Louis Arena | Recap |
| Logan Couture (3) – 18:16 | | First period | 06:22 – Todd Bertuzzi (2); 11:09 – Nicklas Lidstrom (3); 18:01 – pp – Nicklas Lidstrom (4) |
| Dan Boyle (2) – 13:44 | | Second period | No scoring |
| Dany Heatley (3) – 01:14 | | Third period | 18:33 – Darren Helm (2) |
| Antti Niemi 36 saves / 40 shots | | Goalie stats | Jimmy Howard 25 saves / 28 shots |

| May 8 | Detroit Red Wings | 4–3 | San Jose Sharks | HP Pavilion | Recap |
| No scoring | | First period | 17:18 – Devin Setoguchi (5) |
| Niklas Kronwall (2) – 16:25 | | Second period | 15:32 – Joe Pavelski (5) |
| Jonathan Ericsson (1) – 03:43; Daniel Cleary (2) – 05:29; Tomas Holmstrom (3) – 13:52 | | Third period | 00:54 – Logan Couture (4) |
| Jimmy Howard 39 saves / 42 shots | | Goalie stats | Antti Niemi 18 saves / 22 shots |

| May 10 | San Jose Sharks | 1–3 | Detroit Red Wings | Joe Louis Arena | Recap |
| No scoring | | First period | No scoring |
| No scoring | | Second period | No scoring |
| Logan Couture (5) – 03:54 | | Third period | 10:38 – Henrik Zetterberg (2); 12:32 – Valtteri Filppula (2); 18:55 – en – Darren Helm (3) |
| Antti Niemi 42 saves / 44 shots | | Goalie stats | Jimmy Howard 24 saves / 25 shots |

| May 12 | Detroit Red Wings | 2–3 | San Jose Sharks | HP Pavilion | Recap |
| No scoring | | First period | 12:20 – pp – Devin Setoguchi (6); 19:01 – Logan Couture (6) |
| Henrik Zetterberg (3) – 13:10 | | Second period | No scoring |
| Pavel Datsyuk (4) – 13:59 | | Third period | 12:13 – Patrick Marleau (3) |
| Jimmy Howard 27 saves / 30 shots | | Goalie stats | Antti Niemi 38 saves / 40 shots |

| San Jose won series 4–3 |

== Conference finals ==
=== Eastern Conference final ===
==== (3) Boston Bruins vs. (5) Tampa Bay Lightning ====
This was the first playoff series between these teams. Boston won three of the four games that were played in the regular season. Bruins rookie Tyler Seguin scored a goal and an assist in his first career playoff game in game one. In game two, he tied the NHL record for points by a teenager in a single playoff period with four points, two goals and two assists (held by Trevor Linden). Game seven featured remarkable discipline from both teams, as no penalties were called of any kind for either team during the game, the first time this had happened in the playoffs in over twenty years. Boston's Nathan Horton recorded his second game-seven-winning goal in this year's playoffs, as his first was scored against Montreal in round one.

| May 14 | Tampa Bay Lightning | 5–2 | Boston Bruins | TD Garden | Recap |
| Sean Bergenheim (8) – 11:15; Brett Clark (1) – 11:34; Teddy Purcell (2) – 12:40 | | First period | 15:59 – Tyler Seguin (1) |
| No scoring | | Second period | No scoring |
| Marc-Andre Bergeron (2) – pp – 13:37; Simon Gagne (3) – en – 17:29 | | Third period | 18:59 – Johnny Boychuk (3) |
| Dwayne Roloson 31 saves / 33 shots | | Goalie stats | Tim Thomas 29 saves / 33 shots |

| May 17 | Tampa Bay Lightning | 5–6 | Boston Bruins | TD Garden | Recap |
| Adam Hall (1) – 00:13; Martin St. Louis (7) – 19:53 | | First period | 13:58 – pp – Nathan Horton (6) |
| Vincent Lecavalier (6) – pp – 07:48 | | Second period | 00:48 – Tyler Seguin (2); 02:24 – David Krejci (6); 06:30 – Tyler Seguin (3); 16:16 – pp – Michael Ryder (3); 19:41 – Michael Ryder (4) |
| Steven Stamkos (5) – 03:47; Dominic Moore (3) – 13:15 | | Third period | No scoring |
| Dwayne Roloson 21 saves / 27 shots Mike Smith 8 saves / 8 shots | | Goalie stats | Tim Thomas 36 saves / 41 shots |

| May 19 | Boston Bruins | 2–0 | Tampa Bay Lightning | St. Pete Times Forum | Recap |
| David Krejci (7) – 01:09 | | First period | No scoring |
| No scoring | | Second period | No scoring |
| Andrew Ference (2) – 08:12 | | Third period | No scoring |
| Tim Thomas 31 saves / 31 shots | | Goalie stats | Dwayne Roloson 23 saves / 25 shots |

| May 21 | Boston Bruins | 3–5 | Tampa Bay Lightning | St. Pete Times Forum | Recap |
| Patrice Bergeron (3) – 11:47; Michael Ryder (5) – 16:34; Patrice Bergeron (4) – sh – 17:58 | | First period | No scoring |
| No scoring | | Second period | 06:55 – Teddy Purcell (3); 07:58 – Teddy Purcell (4); 10:53 – Sean Bergenheim (9) |
| No scoring | | Third period | 06:54 – Simon Gagne (4); 19:23 – en – Martin St. Louis (8) |
| Tim Thomas 32 saves / 36 shots | | Goalie stats | Dwayne Roloson 6 saves / 9 shots Mike Smith 21 saves / 21 shots |

| May 23 | Tampa Bay Lightning | 1–3 | Boston Bruins | TD Garden | Recap |
| Simon Gagne (5) – 01:09 | | First period | No scoring |
| No scoring | | Second period | 04:24 – Nathan Horton (7); 15:56 – Brad Marchand (6) |
| No scoring | | Third period | 19:47 – en – Rich Peverley (2) |
| Mike Smith 17 saves / 19 shots | | Goalie stats | Tim Thomas 33 saves / 34 shots |

| May 25 | Boston Bruins | 4–5 | Tampa Bay Lightning | St. Pete Times Forum | Recap |
| Milan Lucic (3) – 07:09; David Krejci (8) – 16:30 | | First period | 00:36 – Teddy Purcell (5) |
| No scoring | | Second period | 07:55 – pp – Martin St. Louis (9); 13:35 – pp – Teddy Purcell (6) |
| David Krejci (9) – pp – 09:46; David Krejci (10) – 13:28 | | Third period | 00:34 – pp – Steven Stamkos (6); 10:15 – Martin St. Louis (10) |
| Tim Thomas 21 saves / 26 shots | | Goalie stats | Dwayne Roloson 16 saves / 20 shots |

| May 27 | Tampa Bay Lightning | 0–1 | Boston Bruins | TD Garden | Recap |
| No scoring | | First period | No scoring |
| No scoring | | Second period | No scoring |
| No scoring | | Third period | 12:27 – Nathan Horton (8) |
| Dwayne Roloson 37 saves / 38 shots | | Goalie stats | Tim Thomas 24 saves / 24 shots |

| Boston won series 4–3 |

=== Western Conference final ===
==== (1) Vancouver Canucks vs. (2) San Jose Sharks ====
This was the first playoff series between these teams. Vancouver won three of the four games that were played in the regular season; their only loss to San Jose came in a shootout. Both Vancouver and San Jose played in a series during the 2011 playoffs (Quarterfinals and Semifinals, respectively) where each took a 3–0 series lead, only to see the opposing team win the next three games to force a seventh game. However, both won their respective seventh games to advance to the next round of the playoffs. San Jose, facing elimination in game five, held a 2–1 lead near the end of the game until Ryan Kesler forced overtime by scoring with only 13.2 seconds left in the third period after a controversial icing call. After a scoreless first overtime, Kevin Bieksa was able to capitalize on an unexpected rebound to score the series-winning goal 10:18 into the second overtime, sending Vancouver to the Stanley Cup Final for the first time since 1994. The Canucks had previously won the Western Conference Final on May 24, 1994, 17 years to the day before this year's conference final win, and both games went to double overtime.

| May 15 | San Jose Sharks | 2–3 | Vancouver Canucks | Rogers Arena | Recap |
| Joe Thornton (3) – 18:47 | | First period | No scoring |
| Patrick Marleau (4) – pp – 08:44 | | Second period | 01:49 – Maxim Lapierre (1) |
| No scoring | | Third period | 07:02 – Kevin Bieksa (2); 08:21 – pp – Henrik Sedin (2) |
| Antti Niemi 35 saves / 38 shots | | Goalie stats | Roberto Luongo 27 saves / 29 shots |

| May 18 | San Jose Sharks | 3–7 | Vancouver Canucks | Rogers Arena | Recap |
| Logan Couture (7) – pp – 02:28; Patrick Marleau (5) – pp – 13:03 | | First period | 09:39 – pp – Daniel Sedin (7); 10:18 – Raffi Torres (2) |
| No scoring | | Second period | 12:05 – Kevin Bieksa (3) |
| Ben Eager (1) – 17:27 | | Third period | 07:56 – pp – Chris Higgins (4); 11:41 – pp – Daniel Sedin (8); 14:30 – Aaron Rome (1); 16:42 – Mason Raymond (2) |
| Antti Niemi 31 saves / 38 shots | | Goalie stats | Roberto Luongo 28 saves / 31 shots |

| May 20 | Vancouver Canucks | 3–4 | San Jose Sharks | HP Pavilion | Recap |
| No scoring | | First period | 03:56 – pp – Patrick Marleau (6); 08:22 – pp – Ryane Clowe (5); 17:25 – Patrick Marleau (7) |
| No scoring | | Second period | No scoring |
| Alexandre Burrows (5) – 01:09; Dan Hamhuis (1) – pp – 13:39; Kevin Bieksa (4) – pp – 16:04 | | Third period | 06:46 – pp – Dan Boyle (3) |
| Roberto Luongo 34 saves / 38 shots | | Goalie stats | Antti Niemi 27 saves / 30 shots |

| May 22 | Vancouver Canucks | 4–2 | San Jose Sharks | HP Pavilion | Recap |
| No scoring | | First period | No scoring |
| Ryan Kesler (6) – pp – 09:16; Sami Salo (2) – pp – 10:55; Sami Salo (3) – pp – 11:11 | | Second period | No scoring |
| Alex Burrows (6) – 05:43 | | Third period | 07:02 – Andrew Desjardins (1); 15:55 – Ryane Clowe (6) |
| Roberto Luongo 33 saves / 35 shots | | Goalie stats | Antti Niemi 9 saves / 13 shots |

| May 24 | San Jose Sharks | 2–3 | 2OT | Vancouver Canucks | Rogers Arena | Recap |
| No scoring | | First period | | 08:02 – Alex Burrows (7) |
| Patrick Marleau (8) – pp – 09:57 | | Second period | | No scoring |
| Devin Setoguchi (7) – 00:24 | | Third period | | 19:46 – Ryan Kesler (7) |
| No scoring | | Second overtime period | | 10:18 – Kevin Bieksa (5) |
| Antti Niemi 31 saves / 34 shots | | Goalie stats | | Roberto Luongo 54 saves / 56 shots |

| Vancouver won series 4–1 |

== Stanley Cup Finals ==
As the Presidents' Trophy winners, the Vancouver Canucks earned home ice advantage over the Boston Bruins in the Finals. This was the first playoff series between Vancouver and Boston. Vancouver and Boston met only once in the 2010–11 regular season, on February 26, 2011. Boston won that game by a score of 3–1. This was Vancouver's third appearance in the Stanley Cup Finals; in both of their previous appearances, they lost to a team from New York. In 1982, they were swept by the Islanders. In 1994, they lost to the Rangers in seven games. This was Boston's first appearance in the Finals since their five-game loss to the Edmonton Oilers in 1990. Boston last won the Stanley Cup in 1972, when they defeated the New York Rangers in six games.

In a back-and-forth series, the Bruins triumphed in seven games to win their first Stanley Cup since 1972. The Canucks and Bruins each won their first three home games. All three Vancouver wins were close affairs at Rogers Arena: two 1–0 wins in games one and five, and a 3–2 overtime victory in game two. In Boston at TD Garden however, the games were extremely one-sided in favor of the Bruins, with the Bruins winning games three, four, and six by scores of 8–1, 4–0 and 5–2, respectively. In the deciding game seven at Rogers Arena, the Bruins shut out the Canucks 4–0 to win the Stanley Cup with a 4–3 series victory and the first and only time in the series where the home team lost and the road team won.

| June 1 | Boston Bruins | 0–1 | Vancouver Canucks | Rogers Arena | Recap |
| No scoring | | First period | No scoring |
| No scoring | | Second period | No scoring |
| No scoring | | Third period | 19:41 – Raffi Torres (3) |
| Tim Thomas 33 saves / 34 shots | | Goalie stats | Roberto Luongo 36 saves / 36 shots |

| June 4 | Boston Bruins | 2–3 | OT | Vancouver Canucks | Rogers Arena | Recap |
| No scoring | | First period | | 12:12 – pp – Alex Burrows (8) |
| Milan Lucic (4) – 09:00; Mark Recchi (3) – pp – 11:35 | | Second period | | No scoring |
| No scoring | | Third period | | 09:37 – Daniel Sedin (9) |
| No scoring | | First overtime period | | 00:11 – Alex Burrows (9) |
| Tim Thomas 30 saves / 33 shots | | Goalie stats | | Roberto Luongo 28 saves / 30 shots |

| June 6 | Vancouver Canucks | 1–8 | Boston Bruins | TD Garden | Recap |
| No scoring | | First period | No scoring |
| No scoring | | Second period | 00:11 – Andrew Ference (3); 04:22 – pp – Mark Recchi (4); 11:30 – sh – Brad Marchand (7); 15:47 – David Krejci (11) |
| Jannik Hansen (3) – 13:53 | | Third period | 11:38 – sh – Daniel Paille (3); 17:39 – Mark Recchi (5); 18:06 – Chris Kelly (5); 19:29 – pp – Michael Ryder (6) |
| Roberto Luongo 30 saves / 38 shots | | Goalie stats | Tim Thomas 40 saves / 41 shots |

| June 8 | Vancouver Canucks | 0–4 | Boston Bruins | TD Garden | Recap |
| No scoring | | First period | 11:59 – Rich Peverley (3) |
| No scoring | | Second period | 11:11 – Michael Ryder (7); 13:29 – Brad Marchand (8) |
| No scoring | | Third period | 03:39 – Rich Peverley (4) |
| Roberto Luongo 16 saves / 20 shots Cory Schneider 9 saves / 9 shots | | Goalie stats | Tim Thomas 38 saves / 38 shots |

| June 10 | Boston Bruins | 0–1 | Vancouver Canucks | Rogers Arena | Recap |
| No scoring | | First period | No scoring |
| No scoring | | Second period | No scoring |
| No scoring | | Third period | 04:35 – Maxim Lapierre (2) |
| Tim Thomas 24 saves / 25 shots | | Goalie stats | Roberto Luongo 31 saves / 31 shots |

| June 13 | Vancouver Canucks | 2–5 | Boston Bruins | TD Garden | Recap |
| No scoring | | First period | 05:31 – Brad Marchand (9); 06:06 – Milan Lucic (5); 08:35 – pp – Andrew Ference (4); 09:45 – Michael Ryder (8) |
| No scoring | | Second period | No scoring |
| Henrik Sedin (3) – pp – 00:22; Maxim Lapierre (3) – 17:34 | | Third period | 06:59 – pp – David Krejci (12) |
| Roberto Luongo 5 saves / 8 shots Cory Schneider 30 saves / 32 shots | | Goalie stats | Tim Thomas 36 saves / 38 shots |

| June 15 | Boston Bruins | 4–0 | Vancouver Canucks | Rogers Arena | Recap |
| Patrice Bergeron (5) – 14:37 | | First period | No scoring |
| Brad Marchand (10) – 12:13; Patrice Bergeron (6) – sh – 17:35 | | Second period | No scoring |
| Brad Marchand (11) – en – 17:16 | | Third period | No scoring |
| Tim Thomas 37 saves / 37 shots | | Goalie stats | Roberto Luongo 17 saves / 20 shots |

| Boston won series 4–3 |

== Player statistics ==
=== Skaters ===
These are the top ten skaters based on points. If the list exceeds ten skaters because of a tie in points, goals take precedence, and all the tied skaters are shown.

| Player | Team | GP | G | A | Pts | +/– |
|---|---|---|---|---|---|---|
| David Krejci | Boston Bruins | 25 | 12 | 11 | 23 | +8 |
| Henrik Sedin | Vancouver Canucks | 25 | 3 | 19 | 22 | –11 |
| Martin St. Louis | Tampa Bay Lightning | 18 | 10 | 10 | 20 | –8 |
| Daniel Sedin | Vancouver Canucks | 25 | 9 | 11 | 20 | –9 |
| Patrice Bergeron | Boston Bruins | 23 | 6 | 14 | 20 | +15 |
| Brad Marchand | Boston Bruins | 25 | 11 | 8 | 19 | +12 |
| Ryan Kesler | Vancouver Canucks | 25 | 7 | 12 | 19 | 0 |
| Vincent Lecavalier | Tampa Bay Lightning | 18 | 6 | 13 | 19 | +6 |
| Alexandre Burrows | Vancouver Canucks | 25 | 9 | 8 | 17 | 0 |
| Nathan Horton | Boston Bruins | 21 | 8 | 9 | 17 | +11 |
| Michael Ryder | Boston Bruins | 25 | 8 | 9 | 17 | +8 |

GP = Games played; G = Goals; A = Assists; Pts = Points; +/– = Plus/minus

=== Goaltending ===
This is a combined table of the top five goaltenders based on goals against average and the top five goaltenders based on save percentage, with at least 420 minutes played. The table is sorted by GAA, and the criteria for inclusion are bolded.

| Player | Team | GP | W | L | SA | GA | GAA | SV% | SO | TOI |
|---|---|---|---|---|---|---|---|---|---|---|
| Tim Thomas | Boston Bruins | 25 | 16 | 9 | 849 | 51 | **1.98** | **.940** | 4 | 1,541:53 |
| Carey Price | Montreal Canadiens | 7 | 3 | 4 | 242 | 16 | **2.11** | **.934** | 1 | 455:29 |
| Corey Crawford | Chicago Blackhawks | 7 | 3 | 4 | 218 | 16 | **2.21** | **.927** | 1 | 435:12 |
| Michal Neuvirth | Washington Capitals | 9 | 4 | 5 | 261 | 23 | **2.34** | **.912** | 1 | 589:56 |
| Jimmy Howard | Detroit Red Wings | 11 | 7 | 4 | 364 | 28 | **2.50** | **.923** | 0 | 673:22 |

GP = Games played; W = Wins; L = Losses; SA = Shots against; GA = Goals against; GAA = Goals against average; SV% = Save percentage; SO = Shutouts; TOI = Time on ice (minutes:seconds)

== Television ==
National Canadian English-language coverage of the first three rounds of the playoffs were split between CBC and TSN. This was the third year of a six-year agreement in which CBC and TSN selected the rights to individual series in the first three rounds using a draft-like setup. CBC held exclusive rights to the Stanley Cup Final. French-language telecasts were broadcast on RDS and RDS2.

In the United States, national coverage was split between NBC and Versus, with NBC also airing the first two and final three games of the Stanley Cup Final, while Versus broadcast games three and four. This was the last postseason that only selected first and second-round games were nationally televised, as well as the last postseason American regional sports networks carrying both their teams' first- and second-round games. After Comcast, the owners of Versus, completed its acquisition of a majority stake in NBC Universal, the combined company signed a new TV contract in April 2011. Among the new changes scheduled for 2012, all playoff games were to air nationally for the first time on either NBC or one of NBC Universal's cable channels, and the regional sports networks limited to only airing first-round games.

| Preceded by 2010 Stanley Cup playoffs | Stanley Cup playoffs 2011 | Succeeded by 2012 Stanley Cup playoffs |
