= Prince of Wales Trophy =

National Hockey League trophy

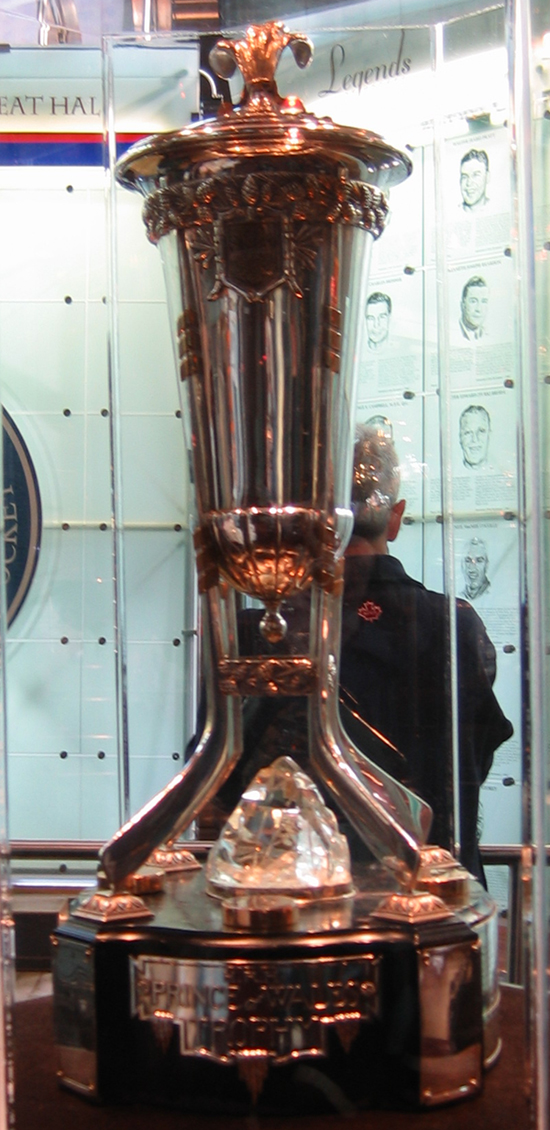
- Sport: Ice hockey
- Awarded for: Eastern Conference playoff champions of the National Hockey League

History
- First award: 1926
- First winner: Montreal Canadiens
- Most wins: Montreal Canadiens (25)
- Most recent: Carolina Hurricanes (3)

The Prince of Wales Trophy, also known as the Wales Trophy, is a team award presented by the National Hockey League (NHL). Named for Edward, Prince of Wales (later King Edward VIII and then Duke of Windsor), it has been awarded for different accomplishments throughout its history.

The trophy was first presented on December 15, 1925, to the winner of the first game in Madison Square Garden. That 1925–26 season was also the last season for which the Stanley Cup was not yet exclusive to the NHL, so the trophy was presented to that season's NHL playoffs champion – and retroactively presented to the playoff champion of the previous two NHL seasons. The Wales Trophy was then awarded to the champion of the American Division (1927–1938) and later the NHL regular season champions (1938–1967). Since the 1967 NHL expansion, it has served as a counterpart to the Clarence S. Campbell Bowl by using the same criteria in the opposite competitive grouping. The Wales Trophy has been awarded to the East Division regular season champions (1967–1974), the Wales Conference regular season champions (1974–1981), the Wales Conference playoff champions (1981–1993), and the Eastern Conference playoff champions (1993–2020, 2021–present).

Due to a modified playoff format held in 2021 because of the COVID-19 pandemic, the Wales Trophy was awarded to the Tampa Bay Lightning after defeating the New York Islanders in the Stanley Cup semifinals.

== History ==
Announcement in The New York Times

The Prince of Wales Trophy was first announced in December 1925. It was sponsored by the then Prince of Wales, Prince Edward, and thus bore the Prince of Wales' feathers and the shield of the Royal Coat of Arms of Canada. Costing $2,500, the trophy was said to be in the possession of the league champion, duplicating the already existing O'Brien Cup for that purpose. To introduce the new trophy into the NHL, it was awarded as a place keeper to the winner of the first game played in Madison Square Garden, held on December 15, 1925 (Montreal Canadiens 3 at New York Americans 1). The trophy was held onto by the Canadiens until the end of the season, when it was presented, for the first time, for its founding purpose – to honour the NHL playoff champion. While the new trophy was in their possession, the Canadiens – who had been the O'Brien Cup-winning NHL playoff championships in 1923–24 and 1924–25 – retroactively engraved their name on the trophy for those seasons.

The Prince of Wales Trophy was then awarded to the NHL playoff champion in 1925–26 and 1926–27, along with the pre-existing O'Brien Cup, before that team would go on to face the Western Hockey League (WHL) champion for the Stanley Cup at the end of those seasons. From the in 1927–28 season on, the trophy was awarded to the champion of the American Division of the NHL, while the O'Brien Cup was presented to the Canadian Division champion, until 1938, when, after the NHL reverted to a single division, the Wales Trophy was made the award for the overall regular season champion.

With the expansion of the NHL in 1967, and the creation of the West Division, the Wales Trophy was given to the team that finished in first place in the East Division, during the regular season. When the league formed two conferences in 1974, the trophy transferred to the team that finished with the best regular season record in the Wales Conference, until 1981. The NHL changed its playoff format so that the two conference playoff champions would meet for the Stanley Cup. The Prince of Wales Trophy was presented to the Wales Conference playoff champions. In the summer of 1993 Wales Conference was renamed the Eastern Conference. Prince of Wales trophy has been awarded to the Eastern Conference playoff champions since the 1993–94 season.

A superstition that is prevalent among many of today's NHL players is that no player should either touch or hoist the Wales (Eastern Conference champion) or Clarence S. Campbell (Western Conference champion) Trophies after they have won the conference playoffs; these players feel that the Stanley Cup is the true championship trophy and thus it should be the only trophy that they should be hoisting. Instead of touching the conference trophy, the captain of the winning team merely poses (usually looking solemn) with the trophy, and sometimes, the entire team poses as well. However, there have been other teams who have ignored the superstition and hoisted the conference trophies, sometimes going on to win the Cup anyway. Most notably, the Pittsburgh Penguins who were considered the most successful team to touch the trophy, winning the Stanley Cup five times after touching it, while losing the Cup final the only time they neglected to do so.

The NHL abolished the conferences and re-aligned the league into four new divisions for the 2020–21 NHL season due to the COVID-19 pandemic. As a result, the semifinal round of the 2021 Stanley Cup playoffs was contested between the winners of the divisional playoffs and they were seeded according to their regular season record. Initially the trophy was not going to be awarded, but it was later decided that the trophy would be awarded to the winner of the Stanley Cup semifinals series between the East and Central divisions, eventually being the New York Islanders and the Tampa Bay Lightning.

== Winners ==
Total awards won
| Wins | Team |
|---|---|
| 25 | Montreal Canadiens |
| 18 | Boston Bruins |
| 13 | Detroit Red Wings |
| 6 | Pittsburgh Penguins |
| 5 | New Jersey Devils |
| 5 | Tampa Bay Lightning |
| 4 | Florida Panthers |
| 4 | New York Rangers |
| 4 | Philadelphia Flyers |
| 3 | Buffalo Sabres |
| 3 | Carolina Hurricanes |
| 3 | New York Islanders |
| 2 | Chicago Blackhawks |
| 2 | Toronto Maple Leafs |
| 2 | Washington Capitals |
| 1 | Montreal Maroons |
| 1 | Ottawa Senators |
| 1 | Ottawa Senators (original) (Note: Refers to the original Ottawa Senators NHL franchise (1917–1934)) |

Key

- * – Defunct team
- † – Eventual Stanley Cup champions
- ^{a} – Engraved in 1925–26.

=== Original winner ===
- December 15, 1925 – Montreal Canadiens (Canadiens 3, New York Americans 1)

=== 1923–1925 (pre-donation) engravings ===
The Canadiens were league champions for these seasons.

| Season | Winner | Win # |
|---|---|---|
| 1923–24 | Montreal Canadiens †^{a} | 1 |
| 1924–25 | Montreal Canadiens | 2 |

=== NHL playoff champions (1925–1927) ===
| Season | Winner | Win # |
|---|---|---|
| 1925–26 | Montreal Maroons * † | 1 |
| 1926–27 | Ottawa Senators * † | 1 |

=== American Division regular season champions (1927–1938) ===
| Season | Winner | Win # |
|---|---|---|
| 1927–28 | Boston Bruins | 1 |
| 1928–29 | Boston Bruins † | 2 |
| 1929–30 | Boston Bruins | 3 |
| 1930–31 | Boston Bruins | 4 |
| 1931–32 | New York Rangers | 1 |
| 1932–33 | Boston Bruins | 5 |
| 1933–34 | Detroit Red Wings | 1 |
| 1934–35 | Boston Bruins | 6 |
| 1935–36 | Detroit Red Wings † | 2 |
| 1936–37 | Detroit Red Wings † | 3 |
| 1937–38 | Boston Bruins | 7 |

=== Regular season champions (1938–1967) ===
| Season | Winner | Win # |
|---|---|---|
| 1938–39 | Boston Bruins † | 8 |
| 1939–40 | Boston Bruins | 9 |
| 1940–41 | Boston Bruins † | 10 |
| 1941–42 | New York Rangers | 2 |
| 1942–43 | Detroit Red Wings † | 4 |
| 1943–44 | Montreal Canadiens † | 3 |
| 1944–45 | Montreal Canadiens | 4 |
| 1945–46 | Montreal Canadiens † | 5 |
| 1946–47 | Montreal Canadiens | 6 |
| 1947–48 | Toronto Maple Leafs † | 1 |
| 1948–49 | Detroit Red Wings | 5 |
| 1949–50 | Detroit Red Wings † | 6 |
| 1950–51 | Detroit Red Wings | 7 |
| 1951–52 | Detroit Red Wings † | 8 |
| 1952–53 | Detroit Red Wings | 9 |
| 1953–54 | Detroit Red Wings † | 10 |
| 1954–55 | Detroit Red Wings † | 11 |
| 1955–56 | Montreal Canadiens † | 7 |
| 1956–57 | Detroit Red Wings | 12 |
| 1957–58 | Montreal Canadiens † | 8 |
| 1958–59 | Montreal Canadiens † | 9 |
| 1959–60 | Montreal Canadiens † | 10 |
| 1960–61 | Montreal Canadiens | 11 |
| 1961–62 | Montreal Canadiens | 12 |
| 1962–63 | Toronto Maple Leafs † | 2 |
| 1963–64 | Montreal Canadiens | 13 |
| 1964–65 | Detroit Red Wings | 13 |
| 1965–66 | Montreal Canadiens † | 14 |
| 1966–67 | Chicago Black Hawks | 1 |

=== East Division regular season champions (1967–1974) ===
| Season | Winner | Win # |
|---|---|---|
| 1967–68 | Montreal Canadiens † | 15 |
| 1968–69 | Montreal Canadiens † | 16 |
| 1969–70 | Chicago Black Hawks | 2 |
| 1970–71 | Boston Bruins | 11 |
| 1971–72 | Boston Bruins † | 12 |
| 1972–73 | Montreal Canadiens † | 17 |
| 1973–74 | Boston Bruins | 13 |

=== Wales Conference regular season champions (1974–1981) ===
| Season | Winner | Win # |
|---|---|---|
| 1974–75 | Buffalo Sabres | 1 |
| 1975–76 | Montreal Canadiens † | 18 |
| 1976–77 | Montreal Canadiens † | 19 |
| 1977–78 | Montreal Canadiens † | 20 |
| 1978–79 | Montreal Canadiens † | 21 |
| 1979–80 | Buffalo Sabres | 2 |
| 1980–81 | Montreal Canadiens | 22 |

=== Wales Conference playoffs champions (1981–1993) ===
| Season | Winner | Win # |
|---|---|---|
| 1981–82 | New York Islanders † | 1 |
| 1982–83 | New York Islanders † | 2 |
| 1983–84 | New York Islanders | 3 |
| 1984–85 | Philadelphia Flyers | 1 |
| 1985–86 | Montreal Canadiens † | 23 |
| 1986–87 | Philadelphia Flyers | 2 |
| 1987–88 | Boston Bruins | 14 |
| 1988–89 | Montreal Canadiens | 24 |
| 1989–90 | Boston Bruins | 15 |
| 1990–91 | Pittsburgh Penguins † | 1 |
| 1991–92 | Pittsburgh Penguins † | 2 |
| 1992–93 | Montreal Canadiens † | 25 |

=== Eastern Conference playoffs champions (1993–2020) ===
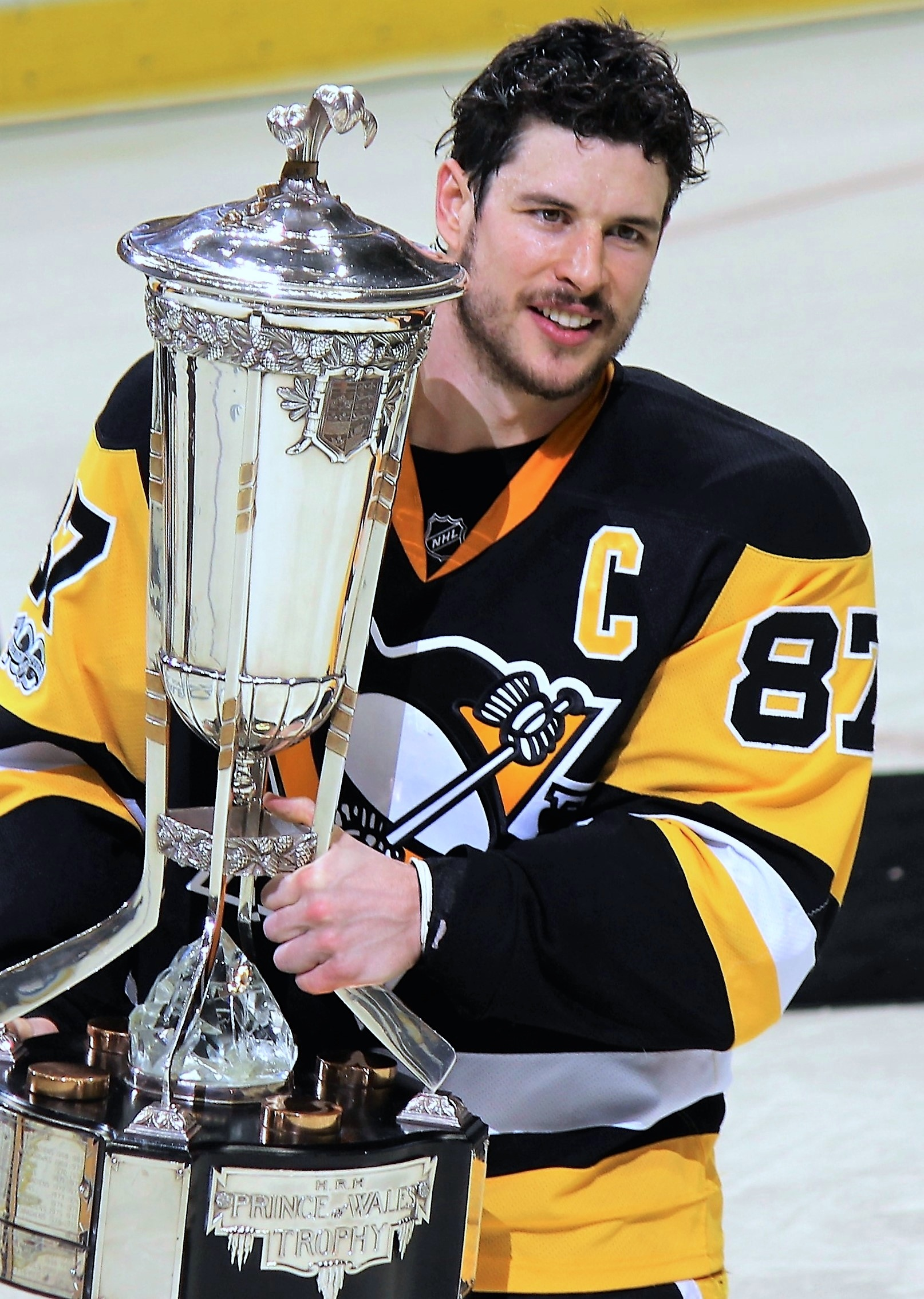
Sidney Crosby of the 2017 Eastern Conference champion Pittsburgh Penguins poses with the Prince of Wales Trophy.

| Season | Winner | Win # |
|---|---|---|
| 1993–94 | New York Rangers † | 3 |
| 1994–95 | New Jersey Devils † | 1 |
| 1995–96 | Florida Panthers | 1 |
| 1996–97 | Philadelphia Flyers | 3 |
| 1997–98 | Washington Capitals | 1 |
| 1998–99 | Buffalo Sabres | 3 |
| 1999–2000 | New Jersey Devils † | 2 |
| 2000–01 | New Jersey Devils | 3 |
| 2001–02 | Carolina Hurricanes | 1 |
| 2002–03 | New Jersey Devils † | 4 |
| 2003–04 | Tampa Bay Lightning † | 1 |
| 2004–05 | Season cancelled due to the 2004–05 NHL lockout | |
| 2005–06 | Carolina Hurricanes † | 2 |
| 2006–07 | Ottawa Senators | 1 |
| 2007–08 | Pittsburgh Penguins | 3 |
| 2008–09 | Pittsburgh Penguins † | 4 |
| 2009–10 | Philadelphia Flyers | 4 |
| 2010–11 | Boston Bruins † | 16 |
| 2011–12 | New Jersey Devils | 5 |
| 2012–13 | Boston Bruins | 17 |
| 2013–14 | New York Rangers | 4 |
| 2014–15 | Tampa Bay Lightning | 2 |
| 2015–16 | Pittsburgh Penguins † | 5 |
| 2016–17 | Pittsburgh Penguins † | 6 |
| 2017–18 | Washington Capitals † | 2 |
| 2018–19 | Boston Bruins | 18 |
| 2019–20 | Tampa Bay Lightning † | 3 |

=== Stanley Cup semifinals (2020–2021) ===
| Season | Winner | Win # |
|---|---|---|
| 2020–21 | Tampa Bay Lightning † | 4 |

=== Eastern Conference playoffs champions (2021–present) ===
| Season | Winner | Win # |
|---|---|---|
| 2021–22 | Tampa Bay Lightning | 5 |
| 2022–23 | Florida Panthers | 2 |
| 2023–24 | Florida Panthers † | 3 |
| 2024–25 | Florida Panthers † | 4 |
| 2025–26 | Carolina Hurricanes † | 3 |

== See also ==
- List of National Hockey League awards
- NHL Conference Finals
- Clarence S. Campbell Bowl
