= Clarence S. Campbell Bowl =

National Hockey League trophy

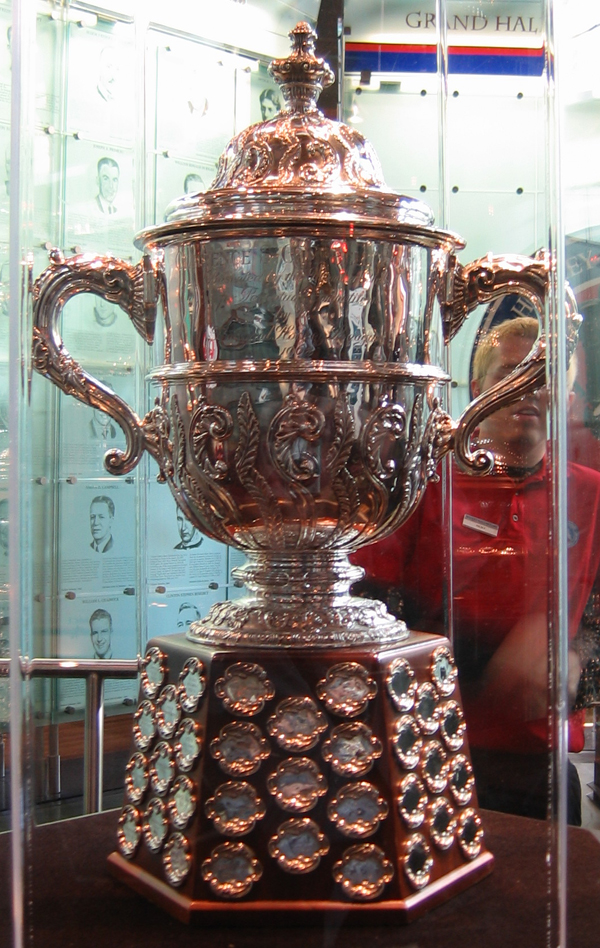
- Sport: Ice hockey
- Awarded for: Western Conference playoff champions of the National Hockey League

History
- First award: 1968
- First winner: Philadelphia Flyers
- Most wins: Edmonton Oilers (9)
- Most recent: Vegas Golden Knights (3)

The Clarence S. Campbell Bowl, or simply the Campbell Bowl, is a team award presented by the National Hockey League (NHL). Named after Clarence Campbell, who served as president of the NHL from 1946–47 to 1976–77, it has been awarded for different accomplishments throughout its history.

The trophy has served as a counterpart to the Prince of Wales Trophy since the 1967 NHL expansion by using the same criteria in the opposite competitive grouping. The Campbell Bowl has been awarded to the West Division regular season champions (1967–1974), the Campbell Conference regular season champions (1974–1981), the Campbell Conference playoff champions (1981–1993), and the Western Conference playoff champions (1993–2020, 2022–present).

Due to a modified playoff format held in 2021 because of the COVID-19 pandemic, the Campbell Bowl was awarded to the Montreal Canadiens, normally an Eastern Conference team, after they defeated the Vegas Golden Knights in the Stanley Cup semifinals.

== History ==
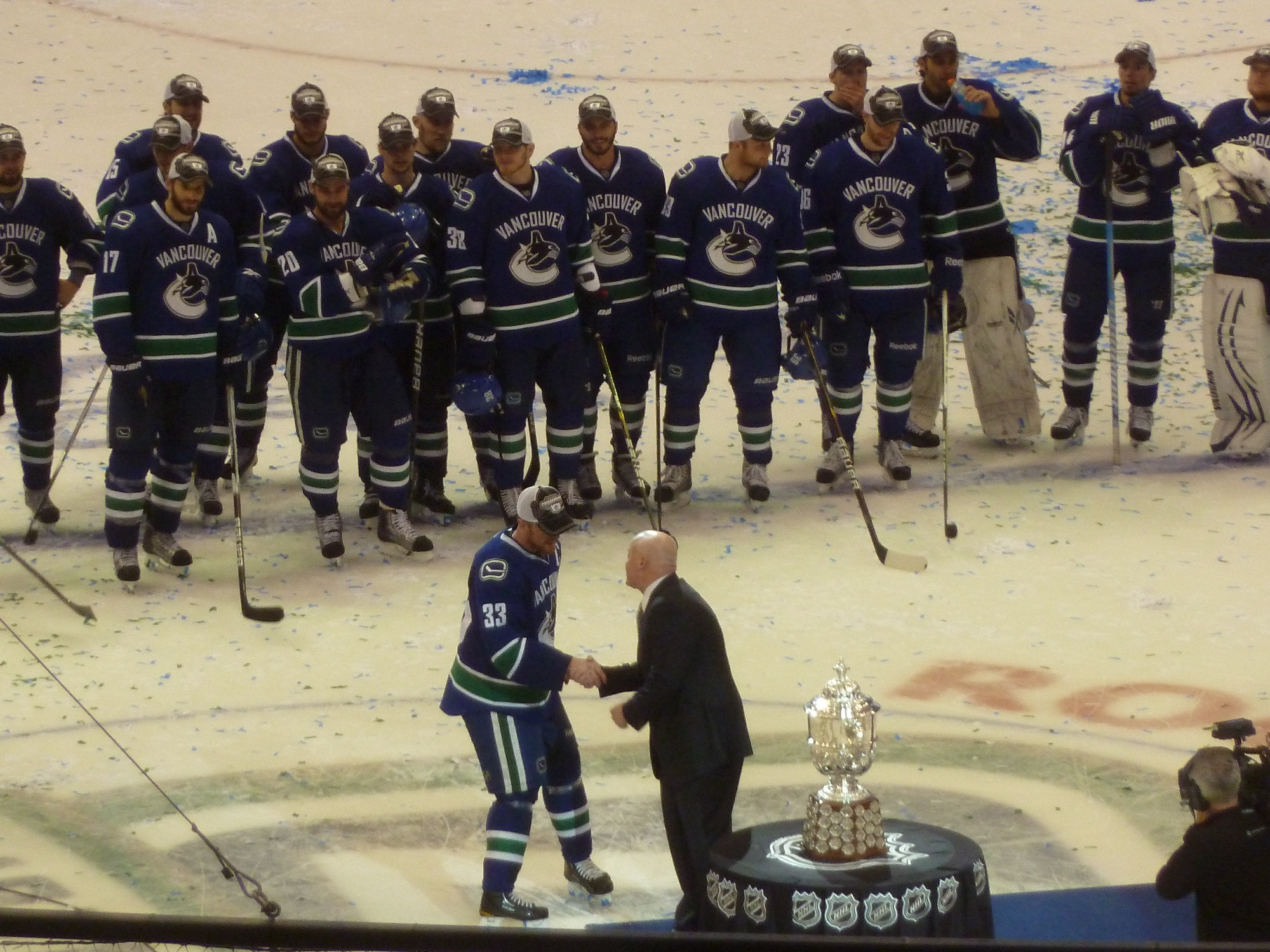
Henrik Sedin of the 2011 Western Conference champion Vancouver Canucks accepts the Campbell Bowl.

The Clarence S. Campbell Bowl was donated by the NHL's clubs in recognition of the contributions and services of its namesake, the League President at the start of the Modern Era expansion. Throughout its history it has been a parallel to the Prince of Wales Trophy, using the same criteria in the opposite competitive grouping. From its inception in the 1967–68 season through to 1973–74 it was awarded to the first-place finisher in the West Division during the regular season. With NHL realignment in 1974–75, it was given to the team with the best regular season record in the Campbell Conference (the successor to the West Division) through the 1980–81 season. Beginning with the 1981–82 season, it switched to the Campbell Conference playoff champions, and since the 1993–94 season, when the Campbell Conference became the Western Conference, the trophy has gone to the Western Conference playoff champions.

A traditional superstition that is prevalent among many of today's NHL players is that no player should either touch or hoist the Campbell (Western Conference champion) or Prince of Wales (Eastern Conference champion) trophies after they have won the conference playoffs; these players feel that the Stanley Cup is the true championship trophy and thus it should be the only trophy that they should be hoisting. Instead of touching the conference trophy, the captain of the winning team merely poses (usually looking solemn) with the trophy, and sometimes, the entire team poses as well. There have been other teams, however, that have ignored the superstition and hoisted the conference trophy and then went on to win the Cup anyway.

The NHL temporarily suspended the conferences and re-aligned the league into four temporary divisions for the 2020–21 NHL season due to the COVID-19 pandemic. As a result, the semifinal round of the 2021 Stanley Cup playoffs was contested between the winners of the divisional playoffs and they were seeded according to their regular season record. Initially the trophy was not going to be awarded, but it was later decided that the Campbell Bowl would be awarded to the winner of the Stanley Cup semifinals between the North and West divisions. Eventually, the Montreal Canadiens (the only Eastern Conference team in that half of the "bracket") defeated the Vegas Golden Knights to win their first and (barring a further change in the playoff format) only Campbell Bowl in their history.

== Winners ==
Total awards won
Wins	Team
9	Edmonton Oilers
7	Chicago Blackhawks
6	Detroit Red Wings
6	Philadelphia Flyers
4	Minnesota/Dallas (North) Stars
3	Calgary Flames
3	Colorado Avalanche
3	Los Angeles Kings
3	New York Islanders
3	St. Louis Blues
3	Vancouver Canucks
3	Vegas Golden Knights
2	Anaheim (Mighty) Ducks
1	Montreal Canadiens
1	Nashville Predators
1	San Jose Sharks

Key

- † – Eventual Stanley Cup champions

=== West Division regular season champions (1967–1974) ===
Season	Winner	Win #
1967–68	Philadelphia Flyers	1
1968–69	St. Louis Blues	1
1969–70	St. Louis Blues	2
1970–71	Chicago Black Hawks	1
1971–72	Chicago Black Hawks	2
1972–73	Chicago Black Hawks	3
1973–74	Philadelphia Flyers †	2

=== Campbell Conference regular season champions (1974–1981) ===
Season	Winner	Win #
1974–75	Philadelphia Flyers †	3
1975–76	Philadelphia Flyers	4
1976–77	Philadelphia Flyers	5
1977–78	New York Islanders	1
1978–79	New York Islanders	2
1979–80	Philadelphia Flyers	6
1980–81	New York Islanders †	3

=== Campbell Conference playoffs champions (1981–1993) ===
Season	Winner	Win #
1981–82	Vancouver Canucks	1
1982–83	Edmonton Oilers	1
1983–84	Edmonton Oilers †	2
1984–85	Edmonton Oilers †	3
1985–86	Calgary Flames	1
1986–87	Edmonton Oilers †	4
1987–88	Edmonton Oilers †	5
1988–89	Calgary Flames †	2
1989–90	Edmonton Oilers †	6
1990–91	Minnesota North Stars	1
1991–92	Chicago Blackhawks	4
1992–93	Los Angeles Kings	1

=== Western Conference playoffs champions (1993–2020) ===
Season	Winner	Win #
1993–94	Vancouver Canucks	2
1994–95	Detroit Red Wings	1
1995–96	Colorado Avalanche †	1
1996–97	Detroit Red Wings †	2
1997–98	Detroit Red Wings †	3
1998–99	Dallas Stars †	2
1999–2000	Dallas Stars	3
2000–01	Colorado Avalanche †	2
2001–02	Detroit Red Wings †	4
2002–03	Mighty Ducks of Anaheim	1
2003–04	Calgary Flames	3
2004–05	Season cancelled due to the 2004–05 NHL lockout	
2005–06	Edmonton Oilers	7
2006–07	Anaheim Ducks †	2
2007–08	Detroit Red Wings †	5
2008–09	Detroit Red Wings	6
2009–10	Chicago Blackhawks †	5
2010–11	Vancouver Canucks	3
2011–12	Los Angeles Kings †	2
2012–13	Chicago Blackhawks †	6
2013–14	Los Angeles Kings †	3
2014–15	Chicago Blackhawks †	7
2015–16	San Jose Sharks	1
2016–17	Nashville Predators	1
2017–18	Vegas Golden Knights	1
2018–19	St. Louis Blues †	3
2019–20	Dallas Stars	4

=== Stanley Cup semifinals (2020–2021) ===
Season	Winner	Win #
2020–21	Montreal Canadiens	1

=== Western Conference playoffs champions (2021–present) ===
Season	Winner	Win #
2021–22	Colorado Avalanche †	3
2022–23	Vegas Golden Knights †	2
2023–24	Edmonton Oilers	8
2024–25	Edmonton Oilers	9
2025–26	Vegas Golden Knights	3

== See also ==
- List of National Hockey League awards
- NHL conference finals
- Prince of Wales Trophy
