= Pennant (sports) =

Commemorative flag used to show support for an athletic team

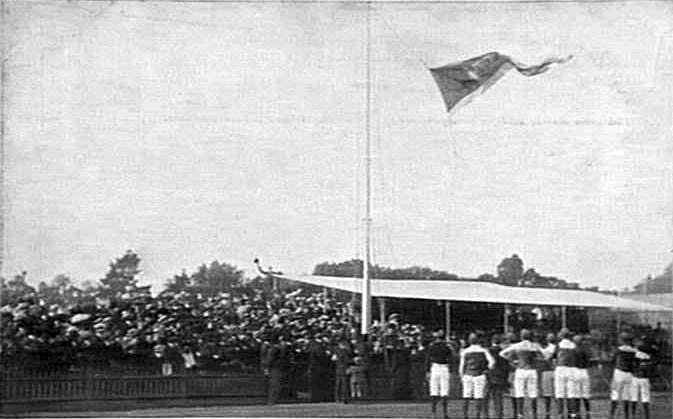
The ritual of hoisting of the premiership flag in Australian sporting culture dates back to 1896, and is an enduring symbol in Australian sporting culture, particularly in Australian rules football. "The Flag" is figuratively still as important as "the Cup", despite a premiership trophy being introduced in the VFL/AFL in 1959, long after the premiership flag. This is the unfurling of the 1906 premiership flag by the Carlton Football Club in Round 1 of 1907; Carlton won the 1906 premiership after defeating Fitzroy in the VFL Grand Final.

A pennant is a commemorative pennon typically used to show support for a particular athletic team. Pennants have been historically used in all types of athletic levels. Traditionally, pennants were made of felt and fashioned in the official colors of a particular team.

Often graphics, usually the mascot symbol, as well as the team name were displayed on pennants. The images displayed on pennants were either stitched on with contrasting colored felt or had screen-printing.

Today, vintage pennants with rare images or honoring special victories have become prized collectibles for sporting enthusiasts. While pennants are typically associated with athletic teams, pennants have also been made to honor institutions and vacation spots, often acting as souvenirs.

== Association football ==
The swapping of pennants between captains before a match is also a long-held tradition in association football.

In Scottish football, the club who wins the league championship receive a flag denoting the achievement. The flag is unfurled at the club's first home game in the following season, which is known as "flag day".

== Australian sports ==
In Australian sports, the term "flag" is used in the same context. The first ever "flag" was awarded to Fitzroy after the club won the 1895 VFA premiership, and gave rise to the tradition of the "flag" being unfurled at the premiership club's first home match of the following season.

== Baseball ==
In Major League Baseball, a pennant typically refers to such a flag flown specifically by the National League and American League champions of a given season, or to such a championship itself. The last few weeks of the regular American professional baseball season are known as a pennant race: this is a reference to the period between 1876 and 1968 when the League championships were determined by the team with the best record at the end of the regular season.

The pennant winners earn the right to play in MLB's championship series, the World Series. Since 1969, the pennant winners have been determined by the National and American League Championship Series – which are similar to the NBA's and the NHL's Conference Finals and the NFC and AFC Championship Games in the NFL.

== See also ==
- Gonfalon – Banner hung from a crossbar on a staff
