= NHL conference finals =

Third round of the Stanley Cup playoffs

The National Hockey League (NHL) conference finals are the Eastern Conference and Western Conference championship series of the NHL. The conference finals are each a best-of-seven series, and comprise the third round of the Stanley Cup playoffs. The two series are played in mid-to-late May (early June in 1995 and 2013, due to labour disputes that delayed the start of the season and September in 2020 due to the COVID-19 pandemic). The winners of the Eastern and Western Conference finals receive the Prince of Wales Trophy and Clarence S. Campbell Bowl, respectively, and advance to face each other in the Stanley Cup Final.

== History ==
Before the 1967–68 season, the NHL was made up only of a single division. From the 1967–68 season through the 1973–74 season, the NHL was made up of two divisions (as opposed to conferences), the East Division and the West Division.

Following the 1973–74 season, the NHL again realigned. The East and West Divisions were renamed the Prince of Wales and Clarence Campbell Conferences, respectively. At the time, the new conferences and divisions had little to do with North American geography and geographical references were removed. Furthermore, all playoff teams were seeded regardless of conference.

Beginning in the 1981–82 season, the conferences and the playoffs were realigned. The NHL was hoping to reduce travel costs in the face of a struggling economy and high energy prices. The regular season and playoffs were also altered to emphasize divisional match-ups. Thus, the first official conference finals were held in 1982.

Beginning in the 1993–94 season, the names of conferences and divisions were changed to reflect their geographic locations. At the instigation of then-new NHL commissioner Gary Bettman, the NHL made the change to help non-hockey fans better understand the game, as the National Basketball Association uses geographic-based names for their conferences and divisions, and the National Football League, and Major League Baseball use geographic-based names for their divisions. Therefore, the Campbell Conference became the Western Conference and the Wales Conference became the Eastern Conference. The winner of the Eastern Conference finals still receives the Prince of Wales Trophy, while the winner of the Western Conference finals still receives the Clarence S. Campbell Bowl. The only exception to this practice was the pandemic-affected 2020–21 season that was played without conferences. The league decided in June 2021 to award the trophies (one per team) to the two victors of the Stanley Cup semifinals. After that season, the league revived the conferences for the 2021–22 season.

The Hartford Whalers never advanced to a conference finals; however, after they relocated to become the Carolina Hurricanes, they did so seven times (2002 as the eventual Cup finalists, 2006 and 2026 as the eventual Cup champions, 2009, 2019, 2023 and 2025). The original Winnipeg Jets never appeared in the conference finals, and after moving to become the Phoenix Coyotes, the franchise did not even win a playoff series until the 2012 Stanley Cup playoffs when they advanced to the conference finals. Of the 32 teams in the NHL, only the Columbus Blue Jackets, Seattle Kraken, and Utah Mammoth have never appeared in the conference finals.

=== Conference trophy traditions ===
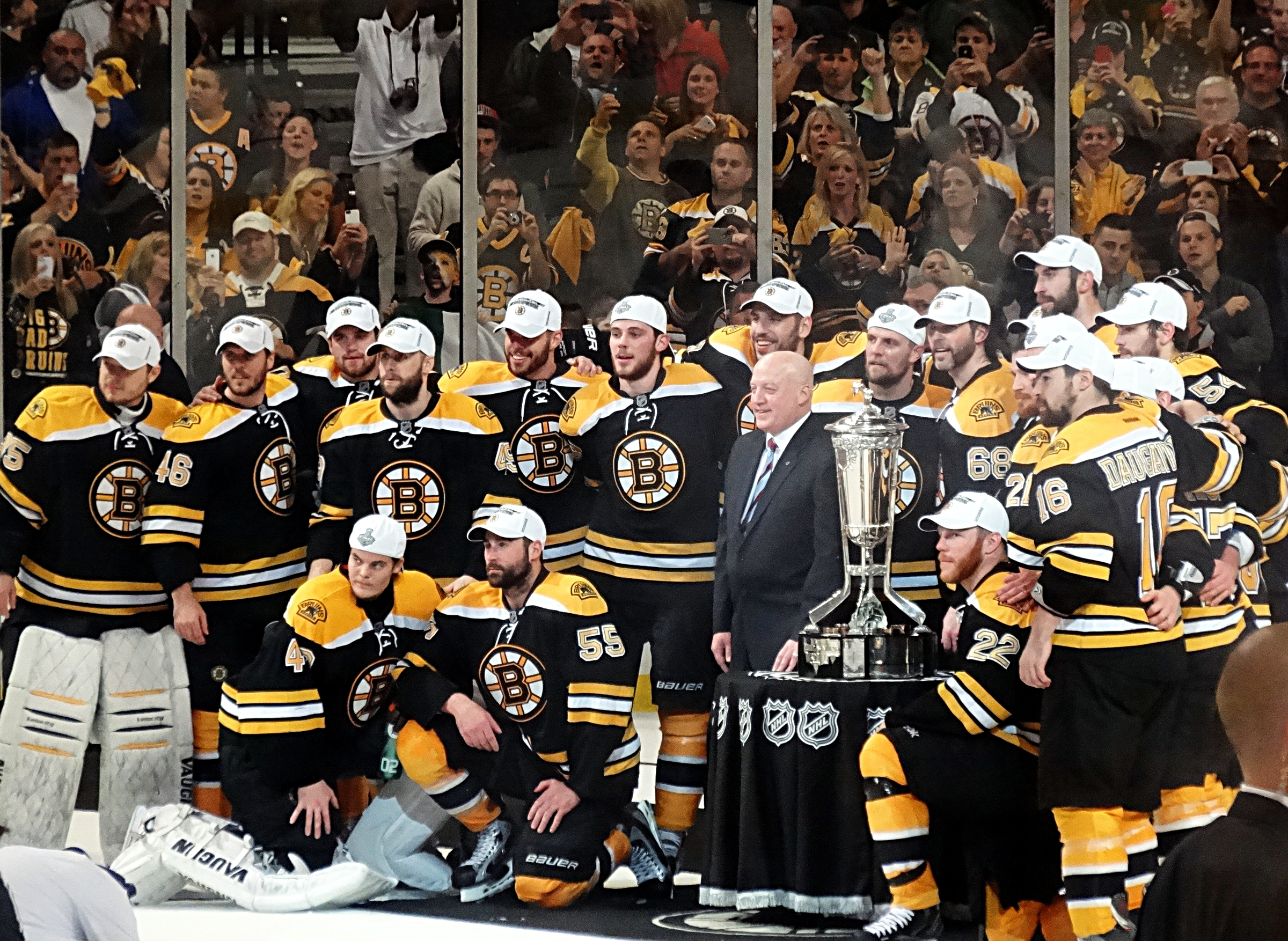
The 2013 Eastern Conference champion Boston Bruins pose with the Prince of Wales Trophy

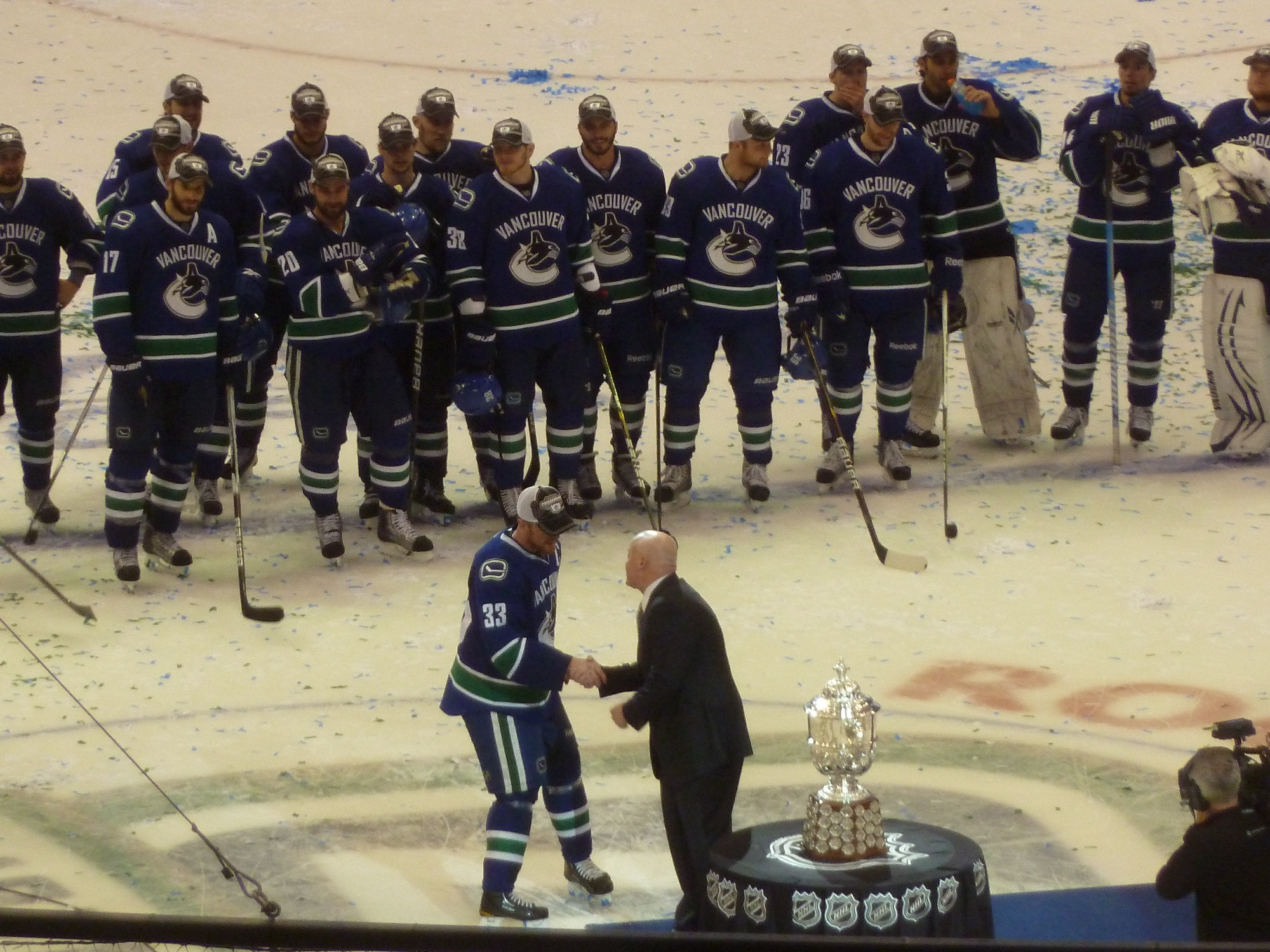
Henrik Sedin of the 2011 Western Conference champion Vancouver Canucks accepts the Campbell Bowl

Another tradition (or rather superstition) that is prevalent among today's NHL players is that no player should touch the Cup itself until his team has rightfully won the Cup. Adding to this superstition is some players' choice to neither touch nor hoist the conference trophies (Clarence S. Campbell Bowl and Prince of Wales Trophy) when these series have been won; the players feel that the Stanley Cup is the true championship trophy, and only it should be hoisted.

However, in 1994, Stephane Matteau, then of the New York Rangers, admitted that he tapped the Wales Trophy with his stick's blade before the overtime period in Game 7 of the Eastern Conference finals. Matteau subsequently scored the game-winning goal in double overtime against the New Jersey Devils. Following the game, Mark Messier, the captain of the Rangers, picked up and raised the Wales Trophy after it was awarded to the team. After winning the Western Conference, Vancouver Canucks captain Trevor Linden lifted the Campbell Bowl. The Rangers prevailed over the Canucks in a seven-game series to win the Cup.

Scott Stevens and Martin Brodeur hoisted the conference trophy as well in 2000, after the New Jersey Devils came back from a 3–1 series deficit to defeat the Philadelphia Flyers in seven games; the Devils would go on to defeat the Dallas Stars (who touched but did not lift their conference trophy) in the Stanley Cup Final. Stevens then also touched the trophy in 2003, after defeating the Ottawa Senators in seven games. Not only touching, Stevens picked up the trophy and made his team take a photo with it. The Devils went on to defeat the Mighty Ducks of Anaheim four games to three in the 2003 Stanley Cup Final.

In 2002, the Carolina Hurricanes hoisted the Prince of Wales Trophy after they won their conference title; the Hurricanes lost their Finals series with the Detroit Red Wings four games to one. Steve Yzerman, captain of the Red Wings during their 1997, 1998 and 2002 Stanley Cup victories, picked up the Clarence S. Campbell Bowl each time, to the delight of the home fans in Joe Louis Arena. The Hurricanes changed course in 2006, refusing to touch the Wales Trophy before defeating the Edmonton Oilers in the Cup Final.

The superstition held true in 2004, as Jarome Iginla of the Calgary Flames grabbed the Campbell Bowl, but Dave Andreychuk of the Tampa Bay Lightning refused to touch the Prince of Wales Trophy; the Lightning won the Stanley Cup in seven games. The Campbell Bowl would not be picked up on the ice again until it was won by the first-year Vegas Golden Knights in 2018.

In 2007, Daniel Alfredsson and Wade Redden of the Ottawa Senators touched and picked up the Prince of Wales Trophy, respectively, but Anaheim Ducks captain Scott Niedermayer never came close to the Campbell Bowl; the Ducks won the Stanley Cup in five games. Steve Yzerman, captain of the Detroit Red Wings during their 1997, 1998, and 2002 Stanley Cup victories, picked up the Clarence S. Campbell Bowl each time, though his successor Nicklas Lidstrom did not touch it en route to a 2008 Stanley Cup victory. Scott Stevens hoisted the Prince of Wales Trophy during the Devils' other two Stanley Cup-winning seasons in 1995 and 2003. In 2009, 2016, and 2017, Sidney Crosby and other members of the Pittsburgh Penguins carried and posed with the Prince of Wales Trophy before going on to win the Stanley Cup. At the close of the 2010 Eastern Conference finals, Philadelphia Flyers captain Mike Richards picked up the Wales Trophy. Jonathan Toews, Chicago Blackhawks captain, did not touch the Campbell Bowl, and the Blackhawks went on to defeat the Flyers in six games for the 2010 Stanley Cup.

In 2012, Los Angeles Kings captain Dustin Brown and the rest of the team refused to touch the Campbell Bowl after winning the conference finals against the Phoenix Coyotes. The team did not take the Campbell Bowl trophy on the plane back to Los Angeles. Instead, Tim Leiweke, president and CEO of Anschutz Entertainment Group (the parent of the Los Angeles Kings), drove the trophy in his car trunk from Phoenix to Los Angeles and showed it to the more-than 10,000 fans that waited at LAX Airport to show their support to their Stanley Cup finalists, who went on to win the Stanley Cup.

In 2015, the Chicago Blackhawks took a team photo with the Campbell Bowl after winning Game 7 of the 2015 Western Conference finals against the Anaheim Ducks at the Honda Center in Anaheim. The Blackhawks would end up defeating the Tampa Bay Lightning in six games in the 2015 Stanley Cup Final. In 2018, Capitals captain Alexander Ovechkin hoisted the Wales trophy after winning the Eastern Conference finals, before ultimately defeating the Vegas Golden Knights in five games to win the Stanley Cup. In 2020, Tampa Bay Lightning captain Steven Stamkos and his teammates lifted the Prince of Wales Trophy after winning the Eastern Conference finals. Head coach Jon Cooper stated "we win a trophy, we pick it up", while Victor Hedman acknowledged that not touching the trophy in 2015 "didn't work". The Lightning went on to defeat the Dallas Stars in six games in the Stanley Cup Final. Stamkos picked up the Prince of Wales Trophy again in 2021 after the Lightning defeated the New York Islanders in the semifinals, and Tampa Bay defended the Stanley Cup by defeating the Montreal Canadiens in five games.

The Colorado Avalanche won three Stanley Cups in their history, and on each occasion, they hoisted the Campbell Bowl. In 2001 (Devils) and 2022 (Lightning), the Avalanche and their Final opponent both hoisted their respective conference titles. In 1996, however, the Florida Panthers refused to touch the trophy. The Panthers then changed course upon winning the Wales Trophy for the second time in 2023, but lost to the Golden Knights, who ended up not hoisting the Campbell Bowl in a change of heart from 2018. That said, the Panthers would follow Vegas' lead in their subsequent Cup Final appearances, refusing to carry the Wales Trophy in both 2024 and 2025 en route to winning the Stanley Cup.

The Edmonton Oilers dynasty under Wayne Gretzky and Mark Messier touched the Campbell Bowl en route to their five Cup titles during the 1980s. In 2006, however, then-captain Jason Smith did not touch the bowl, and the Oilers lost to the Hurricanes in the Cup Final. After winning the Campbell in 2024, captain Connor McDavid decided not to hold the trophy, but the Oilers lost in the Final to Florida. Then in 2025, McDavid decided to touch the trophy in hopes of replicating the 1980s dynasty teams' success, but they still lost to the Panthers in a Final rematch.

== Prince of Wales Conference/Eastern Conference ==
=== Prince of Wales Conference (1982–1993) ===
| Year | Champion | Runner-up | Games | Eventual Cup winner |
|---|---|---|---|---|
| 1982 | New York Islanders | Quebec Nordiques | 4 | • |
| 1983 | New York Islanders | Boston Bruins | 6 | • |
| 1984 | New York Islanders | Montreal Canadiens | 6 | |
| 1985 | Philadelphia Flyers | Quebec Nordiques | 6 | |
| 1986 | Montreal Canadiens | New York Rangers | 5 | • |
| 1987 | Philadelphia Flyers | Montreal Canadiens | 6 | |
| 1988 | Boston Bruins | New Jersey Devils | 7 | |
| 1989 | Montreal Canadiens | Philadelphia Flyers | 6 | |
| 1990 | Boston Bruins | Washington Capitals | 4 | |
| 1991 | Pittsburgh Penguins | Boston Bruins | 6 | • |
| 1992 | Pittsburgh Penguins | Boston Bruins | 4 | • |
| 1993 | Montreal Canadiens | New York Islanders | 5 | • |

=== Eastern Conference (1994–present) ===
| Year | Champion | Runner-up | Games | Eventual Cup winner |
|---|---|---|---|---|
| 1994 | New York Rangers | New Jersey Devils | 7 | • |
| 1995 | New Jersey Devils | Philadelphia Flyers | 6 | • |
| 1996 | Florida Panthers | Pittsburgh Penguins | 7 | |
| 1997 | Philadelphia Flyers | New York Rangers | 5 | |
| 1998 | Washington Capitals | Buffalo Sabres | 6 | |
| 1999 | Buffalo Sabres | Toronto Maple Leafs | 5 | |
| 2000 | New Jersey Devils | Philadelphia Flyers | 7 | • |
| 2001 | New Jersey Devils | Pittsburgh Penguins | 5 | |
| 2002 | Carolina Hurricanes | Toronto Maple Leafs | 6 | |
| 2003 | New Jersey Devils | Ottawa Senators | 7 | • |
| 2004 | Tampa Bay Lightning | Philadelphia Flyers | 7 | • |
| 2005 | No conference finals played due to the lockout. | | | |
| 2006 | Carolina Hurricanes | Buffalo Sabres | 7 | • |
| 2007 | Ottawa Senators | Buffalo Sabres | 5 | |
| 2008 | Pittsburgh Penguins | Philadelphia Flyers | 5 | |
| 2009 | Pittsburgh Penguins | Carolina Hurricanes | 4 | • |
| 2010 | Philadelphia Flyers | Montreal Canadiens | 5 | |
| 2011 | Boston Bruins | Tampa Bay Lightning | 7 | • |
| 2012 | New Jersey Devils | New York Rangers | 6 | |
| 2013 | Boston Bruins | Pittsburgh Penguins | 4 | |
| 2014 | New York Rangers | Montreal Canadiens | 6 | |
| 2015 | Tampa Bay Lightning | New York Rangers | 7 | |
| 2016 | Pittsburgh Penguins | Tampa Bay Lightning | 7 | • |
| 2017 | Pittsburgh Penguins | Ottawa Senators | 7 | • |
| 2018 | Washington Capitals | Tampa Bay Lightning | 7 | • |
| 2019 | Boston Bruins | Carolina Hurricanes | 4 | |
| 2020 | Tampa Bay Lightning | New York Islanders | 6 | • |
| 2021 | Conference-based playoffs not held due to the COVID-19 pandemic. Prince of Wales Trophy was awarded to the Tampa Bay Lightning. | | | |
| 2022 | Tampa Bay Lightning | New York Rangers | 6 | |
| 2023 | Florida Panthers | Carolina Hurricanes | 4 | |
| 2024 | Florida Panthers | New York Rangers | 6 | • |
| 2025 | Florida Panthers | Carolina Hurricanes | 5 | • |
| 2026 | Carolina Hurricanes | Montreal Canadiens | 5 | • |

== Clarence Campbell Conference/Western Conference ==
=== Clarence Campbell Conference (1982–1993) ===
| Year | Champion | Runner-up | Games | Eventual Cup winner |
|---|---|---|---|---|
| 1982 | Vancouver Canucks | Chicago Black Hawks | 5 | |
| 1983 | Edmonton Oilers | Chicago Black Hawks | 4 | |
| 1984 | Edmonton Oilers | Minnesota North Stars | 4 | • |
| 1985 | Edmonton Oilers | Chicago Black Hawks | 6 | • |
| 1986 | Calgary Flames | St. Louis Blues | 7 | |
| 1987 | Edmonton Oilers | Detroit Red Wings | 5 | • |
| 1988 | Edmonton Oilers | Detroit Red Wings | 5 | • |
| 1989 | Calgary Flames | Chicago Blackhawks | 5 | • |
| 1990 | Edmonton Oilers | Chicago Blackhawks | 6 | • |
| 1991 | Minnesota North Stars | Edmonton Oilers | 5 | |
| 1992 | Chicago Blackhawks | Edmonton Oilers | 4 | |
| 1993 | Los Angeles Kings | Toronto Maple Leafs | 7 | |

=== Western Conference (1994–present) ===
| Year | Champion | Runner-up | Games | Eventual Cup winner |
|---|---|---|---|---|
| 1994 | Vancouver Canucks | Toronto Maple Leafs | 5 | |
| 1995 | Detroit Red Wings | Chicago Blackhawks | 5 | |
| 1996 | Colorado Avalanche | Detroit Red Wings | 6 | • |
| 1997 | Detroit Red Wings | Colorado Avalanche | 6 | • |
| 1998 | Detroit Red Wings | Dallas Stars | 6 | • |
| 1999 | Dallas Stars | Colorado Avalanche | 7 | • |
| 2000 | Dallas Stars | Colorado Avalanche | 7 | |
| 2001 | Colorado Avalanche | St. Louis Blues | 5 | • |
| 2002 | Detroit Red Wings | Colorado Avalanche | 7 | • |
| 2003 | Mighty Ducks of Anaheim | Minnesota Wild | 4 | |
| 2004 | Calgary Flames | San Jose Sharks | 6 | |
| 2005 | No conference finals played due to the lockout. | | | |
| 2006 | Edmonton Oilers | Mighty Ducks of Anaheim | 5 | |
| 2007 | Anaheim Ducks | Detroit Red Wings | 6 | • |
| 2008 | Detroit Red Wings | Dallas Stars | 6 | • |
| 2009 | Detroit Red Wings | Chicago Blackhawks | 5 | |
| 2010 | Chicago Blackhawks | San Jose Sharks | 4 | • |
| 2011 | Vancouver Canucks | San Jose Sharks | 5 | |
| 2012 | Los Angeles Kings | Phoenix Coyotes | 5 | • |
| 2013 | Chicago Blackhawks | Los Angeles Kings | 5 | • |
| 2014 | Los Angeles Kings | Chicago Blackhawks | 7 | • |
| 2015 | Chicago Blackhawks | Anaheim Ducks | 7 | • |
| 2016 | San Jose Sharks | St. Louis Blues | 6 | |
| 2017 | Nashville Predators | Anaheim Ducks | 6 | |
| 2018 | Vegas Golden Knights | Winnipeg Jets | 5 | |
| 2019 | St. Louis Blues | San Jose Sharks | 6 | • |
| 2020 | Dallas Stars | Vegas Golden Knights | 5 | |
| 2021 | Conference-based playoffs not held due to the COVID-19 pandemic. Clarence S. Campbell Bowl was awarded to the Montreal Canadiens. | | | |
| 2022 | Colorado Avalanche | Edmonton Oilers | 4 | • |
| 2023 | Vegas Golden Knights | Dallas Stars | 6 | • |
| 2024 | Edmonton Oilers | Dallas Stars | 6 | |
| 2025 | Edmonton Oilers | Dallas Stars | 5 | |
| 2026 | Vegas Golden Knights | Colorado Avalanche | 4 | |

== Team totals ==
Legend: CF = Conference finals; SCF = Stanley Cup Final; bolded year denotes win; italicized denotes active series

| Team | CF appearances | CF wins | CF % | SCF wins | SCF % | Last CF | Consecutive CF | Consecutive SCF appearances |
|---|---|---|---|---|---|---|---|---|
| Edmonton Oilers | 12 | 9 | .750 | 5 | .625 | **2025** | 3 | 3 |
| Chicago Blackhawks | 12 | 4 | .333 | 3 | .750 | **2015** | 3 | — |
| Detroit Red Wings | 10 | 6 | .600 | 4 | .667 | **2009** | 4 | 2 |
| Dallas Stars | 10 | 4 | .400 | 1 | .250 | 2025 | 3 | 2 |
| Colorado Avalanche | 10 | 3 | .300 | 3 | 1.000 | 2026 | 4 | — |
| Pittsburgh Penguins | 9 | 6 | .667 | 5 | .833 | **2017** | 2 | 2 |
| Philadelphia Flyers | 9 | 4 | .444 | 0 | .000 | **2010** | — | — |
| Boston Bruins | 8 | 5 | .625 | 1 | .200 | **2019** | 3 | — |
| New York Rangers | 8 | 2 | .250 | 1 | .500 | 2024 | 2 | — |
| New Jersey Devils | 7 | 5 | .714 | 3 | .600 | **2012** | 2 | 2 |
| Tampa Bay Lightning | 7 | 4 | .571 | 3 | .600 | **2022** | 3 | 3 |
| Montreal Canadiens | 7 | 3 | .429 | 2 | .667 | 2014 | 2 | — |
| Carolina Hurricanes | 7 | 3 | .429 | 2 | .667 | **2026** | 2 | — |
| New York Islanders | 5 | 3 | .600 | 2 | .667 | 2020 | 3 | 3 |
| Anaheim Ducks | 5 | 2 | .400 | 1 | .500 | 2017 | 2 | — |
| San Jose Sharks | 5 | 1 | .200 | 0 | .000 | 2019 | 2 | — |
| Florida Panthers | 4 | 4 | 1.000 | 2 | .500 | **2025** | 3 | 3 |
| Vegas Golden Knights | 4 | 3 | .750 | 1 | .333 | **2026** | — | — |
| Los Angeles Kings | 4 | 3 | .750 | 2 | .667 | **2014** | 3 | — |
| Buffalo Sabres | 4 | 1 | .250 | 0 | .000 | 2007 | 2 | — |
| St. Louis Blues | 4 | 1 | .250 | 1 | 1.000 | **2019** | — | — |
| Toronto Maple Leafs | 4 | 0 | .000 | 0 | – | 2002 | 2 | — |
| Calgary Flames | 3 | 3 | 1.000 | 1 | .333 | **2004** | — | — |
| Vancouver Canucks | 3 | 3 | 1.000 | 0 | .000 | **2011** | — | — |
| Washington Capitals | 3 | 2 | .667 | 1 | .500 | **2018** | — | — |
| Ottawa Senators | 3 | 1 | .333 | 0 | .000 | 2017 | — | — |
| Nashville Predators | 1 | 1 | 1.000 | 0 | .000 | **2017** | — | — |
| Minnesota Wild | 1 | 0 | .000 | 0 | – | 2003 | — | — |
| Arizona Coyotes | 1 | 0 | .000 | 0 | – | 2012 | — | — |
| Winnipeg Jets | 1 | 0 | .000 | 0 | – | 2018 | — | — |
| Columbus Blue Jackets | 0 | 0 | – | 0 | – | N/A | — | — |
| Seattle Kraken | 0 | 0 | – | 0 | – | N/A | — | — |
| Utah Mammoth | 0 | 0 | – | 0 | – | N/A | — | — |

Note: The Colorado Avalanche's totals include two conference finals appearances as the Quebec Nordiques (both losses), and the Dallas Stars' totals include two conference finals appearances as the Minnesota North Stars (one win; subsequent Stanley Cup Final loss). The Arizona Coyotes' only conference finals appearance was in 2012 as the Phoenix Coyotes. The Columbus Blue Jackets, Seattle Kraken and Utah Mammoth remain the only active NHL teams to have never advanced to the conference finals.
