= Western Conference (NHL) =

One of two conferences in the National Hockey League

- Western Conference logo (2006–present)
- League: National Hockey League
- Sport: Ice hockey
- Founded: 1974 (as the Campbell Conference); Renamed as the Western Conference in 1993; Suspended for 2020–21; Reactivated in 2021
- No. of teams: 16
- Most recent champion: Vegas Golden Knights (3rd title) (2025–26)

The Western Conference (French: Conférence de l'Ouest), originally the Clarence Campbell Conference (or Campbell Conference for short), is one of two conferences in the National Hockey League (NHL) used to divide teams. It and its counterpart, the Eastern Conference, each have 16 teams organized into two divisions. The Clarence S. Campbell Bowl is awarded annually to the Western Conference champion.

== History ==
The Clarence Campbell Conference was created for the 1974–75 season when the NHL realigned its teams into two conferences and four divisions. Because the new conferences and divisions had little to do with North American geography, geographical references were removed.

The Campbell Conference was named after its championship trophy, the Clarence S. Campbell Bowl, which in turn was named after Clarence Campbell, NHL president from 1946 to 1977. The Campbell Bowl was originally awarded to the West Division regular season champions (1967–1974).

The conferences and divisions were then re-aligned for the 1981–82 season to better reflect the geographical locations of the teams, but the existing names were retained with the Campbell Conference becoming the conference primarily for the NHL's western teams.

The names of conferences and divisions were changed for the 1993–94 season to reflect their geographic locations, including the Campbell Conference becoming the Western Conference. Then-new NHL Commissioner Gary Bettman made the change to help non-hockey fans better understand the game, as the National Basketball Association (NBA), National Football League (NFL) and Major League Baseball (MLB) all use geographic-based names for their divisions. However, the Campbell Bowl continued to be awarded to the conference's champions. In 2005, following the 2004–05 NHL lockout, the Eastern Conference logo (along with the Western Conference and NHL logos) were changed to its current format.

Along with the Eastern Conference, the Western Conference was temporarily abolished for the 2020–21 NHL season after the COVID-19 pandemic forced a realignment of the League to preclude the need for teams to regularly cross the Canada–United States border. For 2020–21 the four Canadian teams competed in the newly formed North Division while the five remaining Pacific Division teams from the U.S., along with three American teams from the Central Division formed a re-constituted West Division. The other three remaining Central Division teams stayed in that Division and were joined by five American teams from the Eastern Conference. These changes were reversed, starting in the 2021–22 season.

== Divisions ==
The Campbell Conference originally consisted of the Patrick Division and the Smythe Division. The 1981 realignment moved the Patrick Division to the Prince of Wales Conference and added that conference's Norris Division instead. When the names of conferences and divisions were changed in 1993, the Western Conference's divisions became the Central and Pacific. Realignment in 1998 added a third division, the Northwest.

The Northwest Division was dissolved in 2013. Its American teams and Winnipeg joined the Central, while the rest of the Canadian teams returned to the Pacific. With this 2013 realignment, the Central Division is based entirely in the Central Time Zone and Mountain Time Zones, and the Pacific Division is based entirely within the Mountain and Pacific Time Zones.

On June 22, 2016, the NHL awarded Las Vegas an expansion team that began play in 2017, and thus brought the total of Western Conference teams to 15. The NHL awarded a franchise to the city of Seattle on December 4, 2018. The Seattle Kraken began playing in the 2021–22 season, increasing the Western Conference to 16 teams and the Arizona Coyotes moved to the Central Division from the Pacific Division to balance out the conference. In 2024, the Coyotes suspended operations and were replaced by the Utah Mammoth, absorbing all personnel previously under contract with the Coyotes. In the event the Coyotes build a new arena suitable for NHL play by 2029, the Arizona Coyotes would essentially return to the Western Conference, creating a new 33-team NHL in the process. Conversely, should they fail to establish a new suitable arena for play by then, the 16 teams with Utah taking Arizona's place will stand as is and the Coyotes franchise will likely fold.

Pacific Division	Central Division
Anaheim Ducks	Chicago Blackhawks
Calgary Flames	Colorado Avalanche
Edmonton Oilers	Dallas Stars
Los Angeles Kings	Minnesota Wild
San Jose Sharks	Nashville Predators
Seattle Kraken	St. Louis Blues
Vancouver Canucks	Utah Mammoth
Vegas Golden Knights	Winnipeg Jets

== Champions and playoffs ==
The NHL's playoff system has changed over the years. Prior to 1982, the NHL had a unique postseason system compared to the NFL, NBA. and MLB, in which playoff teams were seeded regardless of conference. As a result, two teams from the same conference could meet in the Stanley Cup Final, as happened in 1977, 1978, and 1980. Thus, the Campbell Conference champion, and therefore the winner of the Clarence S. Campbell Bowl, was the team that finished with the best regular season record in the conference.

Ever since the introduction of the Conference finals in 1982, the Campbell Bowl has been presented to the Campbell/Western Conference playoff champions.

In the playoff system introduced in 1982, the top four teams in each division made the playoffs. The first-round winners met in the Division finals, and the division final winners met in the conference finals. In this format, the division standings tended to be very static. In the Norris Division, for example, the Chicago Blackhawks and St. Louis Blues never missed the postseason under this format while the Minnesota North Stars only missed three times. In the Smythe Division, the Calgary Flames and the Edmonton Oilers missed the playoffs only once and the original Winnipeg Jets twice. In both cases, this usually left the other two teams to fight it out for the last playoff spot. In most years, this format resulted in the strongest teams during the regular season being forced to meet in the first or second round rather than the conference finals. For instance, in 1985, Winnipeg finished with the fourth-best record in the entire league, only to be forced to meet fifth-best Calgary in the first round before losing to second-best Edmonton in the division finals.

From 1994 to 2013, the top eight teams in each conference made the playoffs, with the division winners being guaranteed the top seeds (top two from 1994 to 1998, top three from 1999 to 2013) and home ice in the first round regardless of record. Unique between 1994 and 1998, a series involving a Central Division team and a Pacific Division team was a 2–3–2 rotation instead of the normal 2–2–1–1–1 format, with the higher seeded team having the option of starting play at home or on the road.

A new playoff format was introduced as part of the 2013 realignment. Under the new postseason system that was first used during the 2014 Stanley Cup playoffs, the top three teams in each division make the playoffs, with two wild-cards in each conference for a total of eight playoff teams from each conference.
