= Eastern Conference (NHL) =

One of two conferences in the National Hockey League (NHL)

- Eastern Conference logo (2006–present)
- League: National Hockey League
- Sport: Ice hockey
- Founded: 1974 (as the Prince of Wales Conference); Renamed as the Eastern Conference in 1993; Suspended for 2020–21; Reactivated in 2021
- No. of teams: 16
- Most recent champion: Carolina Hurricanes (3rd title) (2025–26)

The Eastern Conference (French: Conférence de l'Est), originally the Prince of Wales Conference (or Wales Conference for short), is one of two conferences in the National Hockey League (NHL) used to divide teams. It and its counterpart, the Western Conference, each have 16 teams organized into two divisions. The Prince of Wales Trophy is awarded annually to the Eastern Conference champion.

== History ==
The Prince of Wales Conference was created for the 1974–75 season when the NHL realigned its teams into two conferences and four divisions. Because the new conferences and divisions had little to do with North American geography, geographical references were removed.

The Wales Conference was named after its championship trophy, the Prince of Wales Trophy, which was originally donated to the league in December 1925 by Edward, Prince of Wales, who later became King Edward VIII and then the Duke of Windsor. That 1925–26 season was also the last season for which the Stanley Cup was not yet exclusive to the NHL, so the trophy was initially presented to that season's NHL playoffs champion – and retroactively presented to the playoff champion of the previous two NHL seasons. The Wales Trophy was then awarded to the champion of the American Division (1927–1938), the NHL regular season champions (analogous to today's Presidents' Trophy; 1938–1967), then the East Division regular season champions (1967–1974).

The conferences and divisions were then re-aligned for the 1981–82 season to better reflect the geographical locations of the teams, but the existing names were retained with the Wales Conference becoming the conference primarily for the NHL's eastern teams.

The names of conferences and divisions were changed for the 1993–94 season to reflect their geographic locations, including the Wales Conference becoming the Eastern Conference. Then-new NHL Commissioner Gary Bettman made the change to help non-hockey fans better understand the game, as the National Basketball Association (NBA), National Football League (NFL) and Major League Baseball (MLB) all use geographic-based names for their divisions. However, the Prince of Wales Trophy continued to be awarded to the Eastern Conference champions. In 2005, following the 2004–05 NHL lockout, the Eastern Conference logo (along with the Western Conference and NHL logos) were changed to its current format.

Along with the Western Conference, the Eastern Conference was temporarily abolished for the 2020–21 NHL season after the COVID-19 pandemic in North America forced a realignment of the League to preclude the need for teams to regularly cross the Canada–United States border. For 2020–21 the three Canadian teams competed in the newly formed North Division while six Metropolitan Division teams and two American teams from the Atlantic Division formed a re-constituted East Division. The five remaining American teams from the Eastern Conference teams joined the Central Division. These changes were reversed, starting in the 2021–22 season.

== Divisions ==
The Wales Conference originally consisted of the Adams Division and the Norris Division. The 1981 realignment moved the Norris Division to the Clarence Campbell Conference and added that Conference's Patrick Division instead. When the names of conferences and divisions were changed in 1993, the Eastern Conference's divisions became the Atlantic and Northeast. Realignment in 1998 added a third division, the Southeast. Another realignment in 2013 reorganized the Eastern Conference into two, eight-team divisions: the Atlantic Division name retained, but was reassigned to what had been the Northeast Division, while the old Atlantic Division was renamed the Metropolitan Division; the Southeast Division was dissolved. With this 2013 realignment, all 16 teams in the Eastern Time Zone are situated within the Eastern Conference.

Atlantic Division	Metropolitan Division
Boston Bruins	Carolina Hurricanes
Buffalo Sabres	Columbus Blue Jackets
Detroit Red Wings	New Jersey Devils
Florida Panthers	New York Islanders
Montreal Canadiens	New York Rangers
Ottawa Senators	Philadelphia Flyers
Tampa Bay Lightning	Pittsburgh Penguins
Toronto Maple Leafs	Washington Capitals

== Champions and playoffs ==
The NHL's playoff system has changed over the years. Prior to 1982, the NHL had a unique postseason system compared to the NFL, NBA. and MLB, in which playoff teams were seeded regardless of conference. As a result, two teams from the same conference could meet in the Stanley Cup Final, as happened in 1977, 1978, and 1980. Thus, the Wales Conference champion, and therefore the winner of the Prince of Wales Trophy, was the team that finished with the best regular season record in the conference.

Ever since the introduction of the Conference finals in 1982, the Prince of Wales Trophy has been presented to the Wales/Eastern Conference playoff champions.

In the playoff system introduced in 1982, the top four teams in each division made the playoffs. The first-round winners met in the Division finals, and the division final winners met in the conference finals. In this format, the division standings tended to be somewhat static, though not quite as static as in the Campbell Conference. In the Adams Division, the Boston Bruins and Montreal Canadiens never missed the playoffs in this format, while the Buffalo Sabres only missed twice. In the Patrick Division, the Washington Capitals only missed the playoffs once, the New York Rangers twice, the New York Islanders three times and the Philadelphia Flyers four. In both cases, this usually left the other two teams to contend for the final playoff spot. This format also raised the possibility of the strongest teams in the regular season being forced to meet in the first or second round rather than the conference finals.

From 1994 to 2013, the top eight teams in each conference made the playoffs, with the division winners being guaranteed the top seeds (top two from 1994 to 1998 and top three from 1999 to 2013) and home ice in the first round regardless of record.

A new playoff format was introduced as part of the 2013 realignment. Under the new post-season system that was first used during the 2014 Stanley Cup playoffs, the top three teams in each division make the playoffs, with two open wild cards spots in each conference for a total of eight playoff teams from each conference.
