= Kariya (disambiguation) =

Kariya, Aichi is a city in central Aichi Prefecture, Japan.

Kariya may also refer to:

== Films ==
- Kariya (film), an Indian Kannada-language film, released in 2003
  - Kariya 2, a 2017 sequel

== People ==
- Martin Kariya (born 1981), ice hockey player
- Paul Kariya (born 1974), retired ice hockey player
- Steve Kariya (born 1977), ice hockey player
- Kariya Jin, a character in the Japanese anime series Bleach
- Kariya Kagetoki, a fictional elite samurai featured in the Japanese anime Samurai Champloo

== Tribes ==
- Kariya or Sabar (people), an indigenous tribe in Musabani, Jharkhand state, India
