= Timo Pärssinen =

Finnish ice hockey player (born 1977)

- Born: January 19, 1977 (age 49) Lohja, Finland
- Height: 5 ft 10 in (178 cm)
- Weight: 181 lb (82 kg; 12 st 13 lb)
- Position: Winger
- Shot: Left
- Played for: HPK (SM-liiga); Cincinnati Mighty Ducks (AHL); Mighty Ducks of Anaheim (NHL); HIFK (SM-liiga); EV Zug (Swiss); Timrå IK (Elitserien); Lahti Pelicans (SM-liiga)
- National team: Finland
- NHL draft: 102nd overall, 2001; Mighty Ducks of Anaheim
- Playing career: 1998–2015

Timo Pärssinen (born January 19, 1977, in Lohja, Finland) is a Finnish retired professional ice hockey forward.

== Playing career ==
Timo Pärssinen began his pro career with TuTo Turku in 1994 and then moved to Kokkolan Hermes in 1997. He would move to HPK the next season and spent the next three seasons with the team. He was drafted by the Mighty Ducks of Anaheim as their fourth-round pick, #102 overall, in the 2001 NHL entry draft. He spent one season is North America, splitting his time with Anaheim and their AHL affiliate the Cincinnati Mighty Ducks, playing 13 regular season games in the National Hockey League, scoring three assists and collecting 2 penalty minutes. He returned to Finland the next season with HIFK where he spent three seasons. In 2005, he moved to EV Zug in Switzerland's Nationalliga A before moving to Sweden to play for Timrå.

== Awards ==
Medal record

Ice hockey

Representing Finland

World Championships
Silver medal – second place	2001 Germany	
Silver medal – second place	2007 Russia	

- Jarmo Wasama memorial trophy as best rookie in 1999
- Veli-Pekka Ketola trophy for most points scored during regular season play in 2004
- Aarne Honkavaara trophy for most goals scored during regular season play in 2004
- Lasse Oksanen trophy for best player during regular season play in 2004
- Kultainen kypärä award for best player as selected by the players in 2004

== Career statistics ==
=== Regular season and playoffs ===
			Regular season					Playoffs
Season	Team	League	GP	G	A	Pts	PIM	GP	G	A	Pts	PIM
1994–95	TuTo Hockey	FIN.2 U20	14	9	6	15	33	—	—	—	—	—
1994–95	TuTo Hockey	SM-l	1	1	0	1	0	—	—	—	—	—
1995–96	TuTo Hockey	FIN.2 U20	25	30	21	51	48	—	—	—	—	—
1995–96	TuTo Hockey	SM-l	6	0	0	0	4	—	—	—	—	—
1996–97	TuTo Hockey	FIN.2 U20	9	2	14	16	36	—	—	—	—	—
1996–97	TuTo Hockey	FIN.2	39	21	29	50	30	—	—	—	—	—
1997–98	Hermes	FIN.2	41	27	33	60	60	8	3	6	9	10
1998–99	HPK	SM-l	46	15	24	39	46	8	2	3	5	8
1999–2000	HPK	SM-l	53	25	27	52	60	8	5	5	10	8
2000–01	HPK	SM-l	54	18	31	49	50	—	—	—	—	—
2001–02	Mighty Ducks of Anaheim	NHL	17	0	3	3	2	—	—	—	—	—
2001–02	Cincinnati Mighty Ducks	AHL	49	14	24	38	22	3	0	2	2	0
2002–03	HIFK	SM-l	55	16	31	47	41	4	2	0	2	0
2003–04	HIFK	SM-l	56	32	30	62	22	13	2	4	6	8
2004–05	HIFK	SM-l	34	12	6	18	50	5	0	1	1	12
2005–06	EV Zug	NLA	43	13	12	25	57	7	2	1	3	0
2006–07	Timrå IK	SEL	27	8	8	16	26	7	4	1	5	2
2007–08	Timrå IK	SEL	34	11	16	27	28	11	3	6	9	16
2008–09	Timrå IK	SEL	31	6	18	24	38	6	1	1	2	6
2009–10	Timrå IK	SEL	54	8	13	21	22	5	0	3	3	4
2010–11	Timrå IK	SEL	36	11	10	21	18	—	—	—	—	—
2011–12	Timrå IK	SEL	53	7	9	16	20	—	—	—	—	—
2012–13	Pelicans	SM-l	60	13	17	30	38	—	—	—	—	—
2013–14	Pelicans	Liiga	57	14	17	31	16	8	1	0	1	8
2014–15	TUTO Hockey	Mestis	37	17	24	41	30	15	2	9	11	8
SM-l/Liiga totals			422	146	183	329	325	47	13	13	26	44
SEL totals			235	51	74	125	152	34	9	11	20	28

=== International ===
Year	Team	Event	GP	G	A	Pts	PIM
2001	Finland	WC	9	2	6	8	8
2002	Finland	WC	9	3	5	8	4
2004	Finland	WC	7	1	3	4	0
2005	Finland	WC	7	1	4	5	0
2007	Finland	WC	9	2	0	2	2
Senior totals			41	9	18	27	14

Preceded by Antti Miettinen	Winner of the Kultainen kypärä trophy 2003–04	Succeeded by Tim Thomas
Preceded by Antti Miettinen	Winner of the Lasse Oksanen trophy 2003–04	Succeeded by Tim Thomas
Preceded by Tomáš Kucharčík	Winner of the Veli-Pekka Ketola trophy 2003–04	Succeeded by Steve Kariya
Preceded by Tomáš Kucharčík	Winner of the Aarne Honkavaara trophy 2003–04	Succeeded by Pasi Saarela
Preceded by Pasi Puistola	Winner of the Jarmo Wasama memorial trophy 1998–99	Succeeded by Antero Niittymäki
