= Aarne Honkavaara trophy =

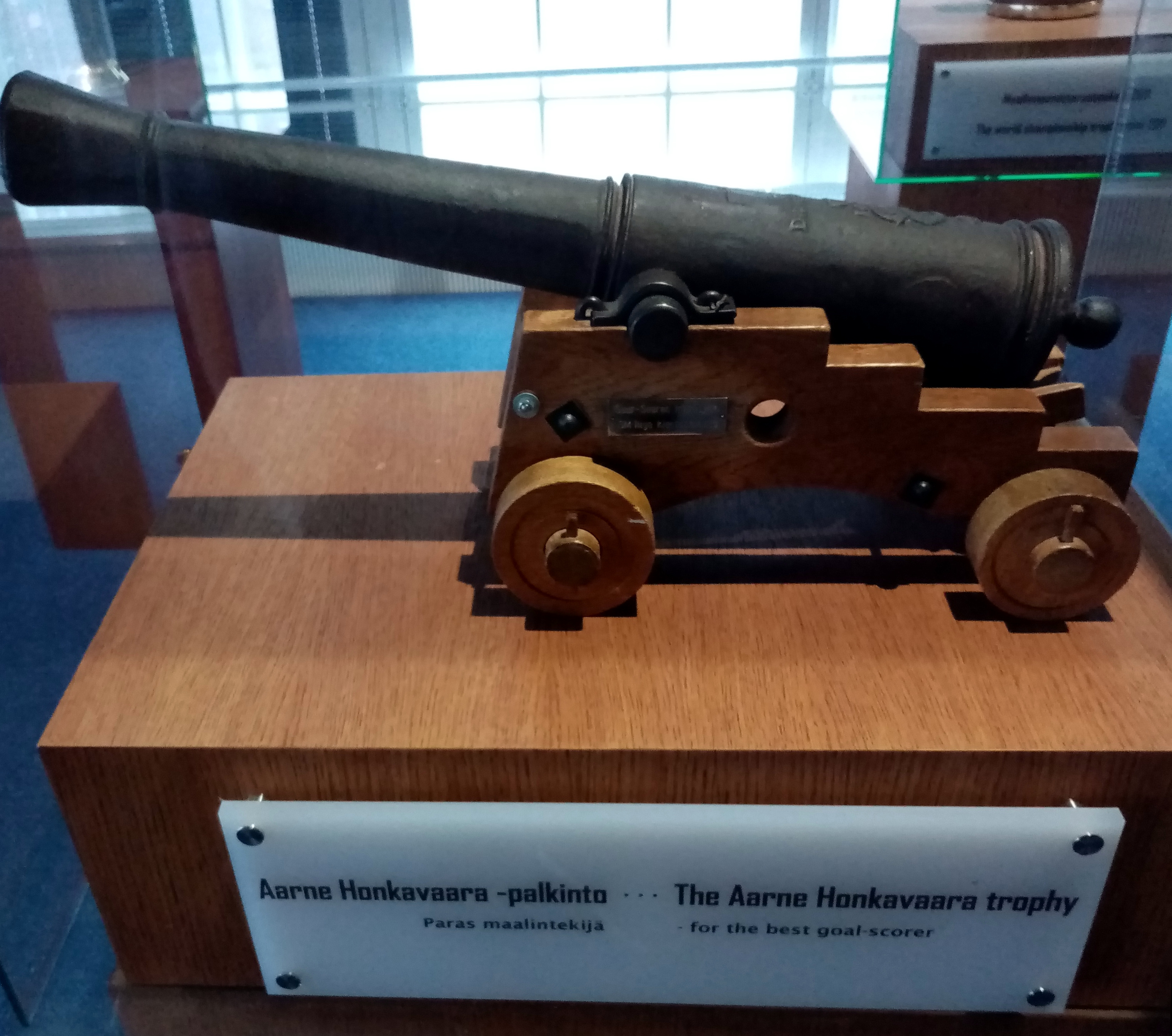
Aarne Honkavaara trophy

The Aarne Honkavaara trophy is an ice hockey trophy given by the Finnish Liiga to the player who scores the most goals during regular season play.

Trophy winners:

- 1977-78: Markku Kiimalainen (Kärpät)
- 1978-79: Kari Makkonen (Ässät)
- 1979-80: Matti Hagman (HIFK)
- 1980-81: Arto Javanainen (Ässät)
- 1981-82: Reijo Leppänen (TPS)
- 1982-83: Raimo Summanen (Ilves)
- 1983-84: Arto Javanainen (Ässät)
- 1984-85: Mikko Mäkelä (Ilves)
- 1985-86: Arto Javanainen (Ässät)
- 1986-87: Risto Kurkinen (JYP)
- 1987-88: Arto Javanainen (TPS)
- 1988-89: Jukka Vilander (TPS)
- 1989-90: Raimo Summanen (Ilves)
- 1990-91: Arto Javanainen (Ässät)
- 1991-92: Teemu Selänne (Jokerit)
- 1992-93: Tomas Kapusta (HPK)
- 1993-94: Marko Jantunen (TPS)
- 1994-95: Kai Nurminen (HPK)
- 1995-96: Juha Riihijärvi (Lukko)
- 1996-97: Petri Varis (Jokerit)
- 1997-98: Dale McTavish (SaiPa)
- 1998-99: Pasi Saarela (Jokerit)
- 1999-00: Kai Nurminen (TPS)
- 2000-01: Jaroslav Bednar (HIFK)
- 2001-02: Vesa Viitakoski (Ilves)
- 2002-03: Tomas Kucharcik (HPK)
- 2003-04: Timo Pärssinen (HIFK)
- 2004-05: Pasi Saarela (Lukko)
- 2005-06: Tony Salmelainen (HIFK)
- 2006-07: Jani Rita (Jokerit)
- 2007-08: Janne Pesonen (Kärpät)
- 2008-09: Jussi Makkonen (HPK)
- 2009-10: Jukka Hentunen (Jokerit)
- 2010-11: Janne Lahti (Jokerit)
- 2011-12: Tomáš Záborský (Ässät)
- 2012-13: Juha-Pekka Haataja (Kärpät)
- 2013-14: Olli Palola (Tappara)
- 2014-15: Olli Palola (Tappara)
- 2015-16: Chad Rau (SaiPa)
- 2016-17: Veli-Matti Savinainen (Tappara)
- 2017-18: Charles Bertrand (Kärpät)
- 2018-19: Malte Strömwall (KooKoo)
- 2019-20: Julius Nättinen (JYP)
- 2020-21: Sebastian Wännström (Ässät)
- 2021-22: Anton Levtchi (Tappara)
- 2022-23: Reid Gardiner (JYP)
- 2023-24: Teemu Turunen (Kärpät)
- 2024-25: Iiro Pakarinen (HIFK)
- 2025-26: Valtteri Ojantakanen (JYP)
