= Tony Salmelainen =

Finnish ice hockey player

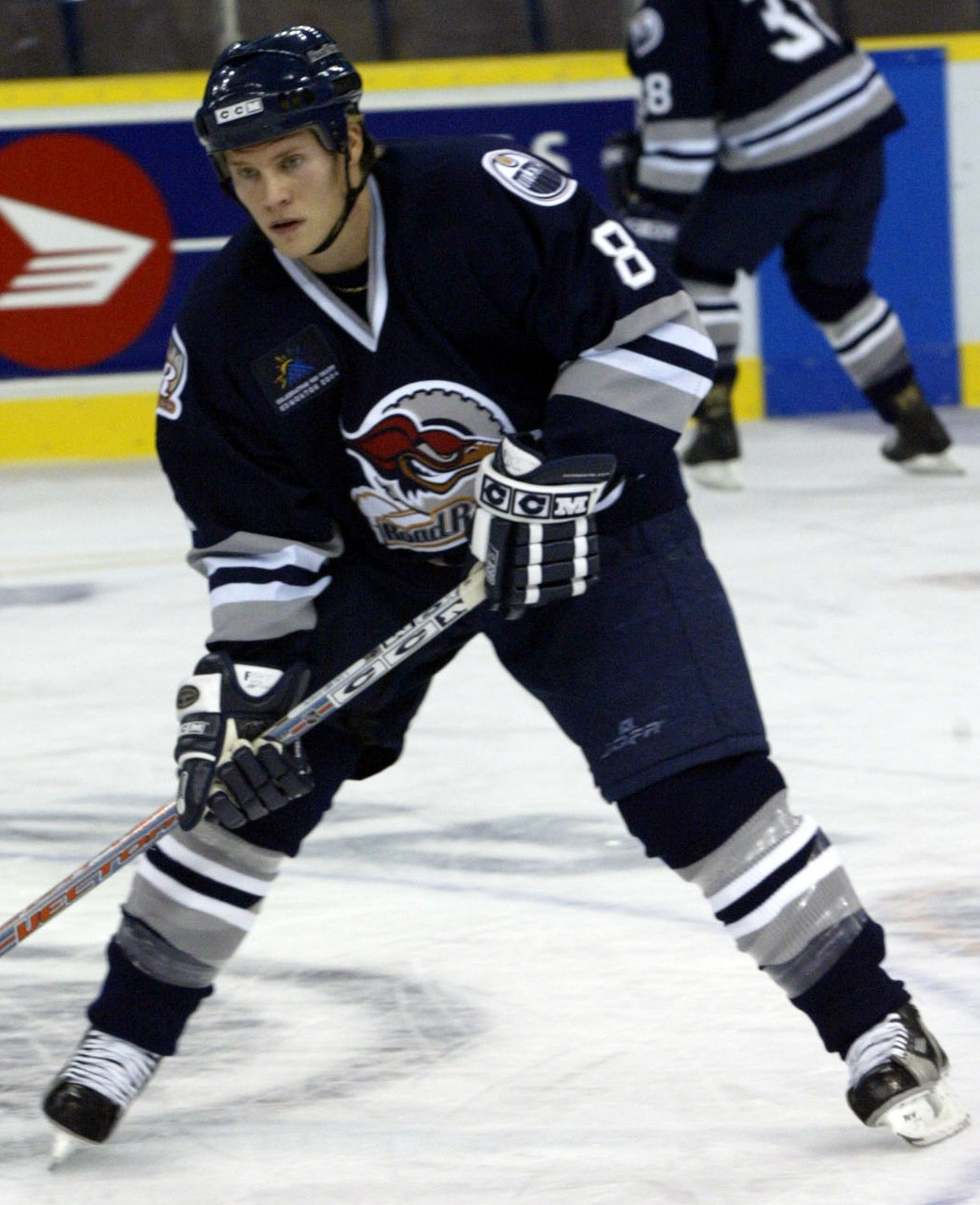
- Salmelainen with the Edmonton Road Runners in 2004
- Born: August 8, 1981 (age 45) Espoo, Finland
- Height: 5 ft 9 in (175 cm)
- Weight: 185 lb (84 kg; 13 st 3 lb)
- Position: Winger
- Shot: Right
- Liiga team Former teams: HIFK; Ilves; Edmonton Oilers; Chicago Blackhawks; Lokomotiv Yaroslavl; Genève-Servette HC
- National team: Finland
- NHL draft: 41st overall, 1999; Edmonton Oilers
- Playing career: 2000–2013

Tony Salmelainen (born August 8, 1981) is a Finnish former professional ice hockey forward. He last played for HIFK of the Finnish Liiga in 2013. He was originally drafted by the Edmonton Oilers as their second-round pick in the 1999 NHL entry draft. His father Tommi Salmelainen was the first European ever to be drafted by an NHL team.

== Playing career ==
Salmelainen started his ice hockey career as a junior player in the Blues organisation, and moved to HIFK for his SM-liiga debut in the 1999–2000 season. In an eventful debut, Salmelainen scored his first goal in his very first shift, and was injured later in the game. He played 19 games for HIFK next season, and transferred to Ilves to get more ice time.

After two seasons with Ilves, Salmelainen moved to North America, where he spent three years with the Edmonton Oilers organization, playing in 13 NHL games in the 2003–04 NHL season.

When the NHL resumed play in 2005, Salmelainen returned to HIFK. He played an excellent season, including setting a personal record by scoring a five-goal, six-point night against the Pelicans in a home game on October 10, and culminating in being chosen best player of the regular season after leading the league in points and goals.

Salmelainen also made headlines during the 2005–06 season when he was sent off during a game against HPK, and threw a trashcan down the corridor to the dressing rooms in anger. After narrowly missing goaltender Jan Lundell, the trashcan accidentally hit his team's bus driver, who was injured in the face. Salmelainen was interrogated by the police and received a two-game suspension.

Salmelainen's NHL player rights were traded from the Edmonton Oilers to the Chicago Blackhawks for defenseman Jaroslav Špaček on January 26, 2006. In the summer of 2006, he signed a new contract with the Blackhawks. On June 16, 2007, he was traded, with Jassen Cullimore, to the Montreal Canadiens in exchange of Sergei Samsonov.

On August 31, 2007, the Toronto Maple Leafs signed Salmelainen to a one-year, two-way contract. On October 23, 2007, Salmelainen was suspended by the Maple Leafs for failing to comply with the terms of his contract after he had signed to play for Yaroslavl Lokomotiv of the Russian Super League for almost $1.5-million (U.S.).

After one season with Yaroslavl, Salmelainen moved to the Swiss National League A with Genève-Servette HC, where he played five seasons.

On July 29, 2013, Salmelainen returned to his first professional club, in signing a one-year contract with HIFK of his native Finland. However, he was soon forced to end his career due to a neck injury.

== Career statistics ==
=== Regular season and playoffs ===
| | | | Regular season | | | | | Playoffs |
| Season | Team | League | GP | G | A | Pts | PIM | GP | G | A | Pts | PIM |
|---|---|---|---|---|---|---|---|---|---|---|---|---|
| 1997–98 | Kiekko–Espoo | FIN U18 | 5 | 2 | 2 | 4 | 10 | — | — | — | — | — |
| 1997–98 | HIFK | FIN U18 | 28 | 23 | 16 | 39 | 30 | — | — | — | — | — |
| 1997–98 | HIFK | FIN U20 | 5 | 0 | 0 | 0 | 0 | — | — | — | — | — |
| 1998–99 | HIFK | FIN U20 | 21 | 13 | 10 | 23 | 45 | — | — | — | — | — |
| 1999–2000 | HIFK | FIN U20 | 1 | 0 | 1 | 1 | 0 | — | — | — | — | — |
| 1999–2000 | HIFK | SM-l | 1 | 1 | 0 | 1 | 0 | — | — | — | — | — |
| 2000–01 | HIFK | SM-l | 19 | 1 | 0 | 1 | 2 | — | — | — | — | — |
| 2000–01 | Ilves | FIN U20 | 6 | 4 | 5 | 9 | 2 | — | — | — | — | — |
| 2000–01 | Ilves | SM-l | 26 | 3 | 10 | 13 | 2 | 3 | 0 | 0 | 0 | 0 |
| 2001–02 | Ilves | SM-l | 49 | 10 | 9 | 19 | 30 | 3 | 0 | 0 | 0 | 2 |
| 2002–03 | Hamilton Bulldogs | AHL | 67 | 14 | 19 | 33 | 14 | 17 | 6 | 8 | 14 | 0 |
| 2003–04 | Toronto Roadrunners | AHL | 58 | 19 | 25 | 44 | 27 | 3 | 0 | 1 | 1 | 0 |
| 2003–04 | Edmonton Oilers | NHL | 13 | 0 | 1 | 1 | 4 | — | — | — | — | — |
| 2004–05 | Edmonton Road Runners | AHL | 76 | 22 | 24 | 46 | 26 | — | — | — | — | — |
| 2005–06 | HIFK | SM-l | 53 | 27 | 28 | 55 | 63 | 12 | 4 | 2 | 6 | 36 |
| 2006–07 | Chicago Blackhawks | NHL | 57 | 6 | 11 | 17 | 26 | — | — | — | — | — |
| 2007–08 | Toronto Marlies | AHL | 2 | 2 | 0 | 2 | 0 | — | — | — | — | — |
| 2007–08 | Lokomotiv Yaroslavl | RSL | 29 | 3 | 4 | 7 | 2 | 16 | 0 | 0 | 0 | 6 |
| 2008–09 | Genève–Servette HC | NLA | 29 | 16 | 12 | 28 | 28 | 4 | 1 | 2 | 3 | 2 |
| 2008–09 | Lausanne HC | SUI.2 | 1 | 0 | 1 | 1 | 0 | — | — | — | — | — |
| 2009–10 | Genève–Servette HC | NLA | 50 | 25 | 28 | 53 | 14 | 18 | 10 | 12 | 22 | 33 |
| 2009–10 | Lausanne HC | SUI.2 | — | — | — | — | — | 1 | 2 | 0 | 2 | 0 |
| 2010–11 | Genève–Servette HC | NLA | 43 | 10 | 11 | 21 | 34 | 6 | 1 | 4 | 5 | 4 |
| 2011–12 | Genève–Servette HC | NLA | 30 | 9 | 14 | 23 | 6 | — | — | — | — | — |
| 2012–13 | Genève–Servette HC | NLA | 7 | 1 | 3 | 4 | 4 | 7 | 2 | 0 | 2 | 10 |
| 2012–13 | Lausanne HC | SUI.2 | 1 | 1 | 1 | 2 | 0 | — | — | — | — | — |
| 2013–14 | HIFK | Liiga | 7 | 3 | 2 | 5 | 2 | — | — | — | — | — |
| SM-l/Liiga totals | | | 155 | 45 | 49 | 94 | 99 | 18 | 4 | 2 | 6 | 38 |
| AHL totals | | | 203 | 57 | 68 | 125 | 67 | 20 | 6 | 9 | 15 | 0 |
| NHL totals | | | 70 | 6 | 12 | 18 | 30 | — | — | — | — | — |

=== International ===
| Year | Team | Event | GP | G | A | Pts | PIM |
|---|---|---|---|---|---|---|---|
| 1998 | Finland | EJC | 6 | 1 | 1 | 2 | 0 |
| 1999 | Finland | WJC18 | 6 | 1 | 2 | 3 | 8 |
| 2001 | Finland | WJC | 7 | 3 | 2 | 5 | 6 |
| Junior totals | | | 19 | 5 | 5 | 10 | 14 |

== Awards ==
- Lasse Oksanen trophy for best player during the regular season - 2006
- Aarne Honkavaara trophy for best goal scorer during the regular season - 2006
- Veli-Pekka Ketola trophy for most points scored during the regular season - 2006

| Preceded by Tim Thomas | Winner of the Lasse Oksanen trophy 2005–06 | Succeeded by Cory Murphy |
| Preceded by Steve Kariya | Winner of the Veli-Pekka Ketola trophy 2005–06 | Succeeded by Martin Kariya |
| Preceded by Pasi Saarela | Winner of the Aarne Honkavaara trophy 2005–06 | Succeeded by Jani Rita |
