= Jon DiSalvatore =

American ice hockey player (born 1981)

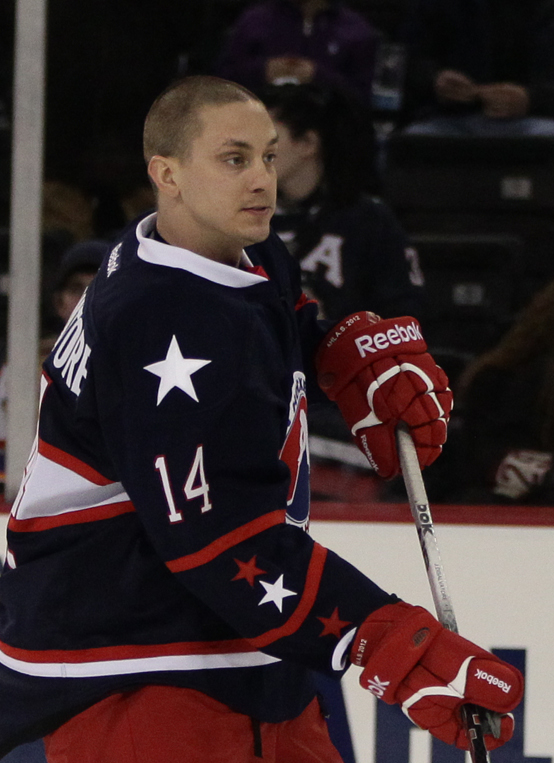
- DiSalvatore at the 2012 AHL All-Star Game
- Born: March 30, 1981 (age 45) Bangor, Maine, U.S.
- Height: 6 ft 1 in (185 cm)
- Weight: 200 lb (91 kg; 14 st 4 lb)
- Position: Right wing
- Shot: Right
- Played for: St. Louis Blues; Minnesota Wild; EHC München
- NHL draft: 104th overall, 2000; San Jose Sharks
- Playing career: 2003–2016

Jonathan David DiSalvatore (born March 30, 1981) is an American former professional ice hockey player. He was selected by the San Jose Sharks in the 4th round (104th overall) of the 2000 NHL entry draft. DiSalvatore played five games in the National Hockey League with the St. Louis Blues during the 2005–06 NHL season and one game with the Minnesota Wild in the 2011–12 NHL season. On December 11, 2015 DiSalvatore played in his 800th American Hockey League game, putting him 2nd all-time in AHL games played for a U.S born player. On February 5, 2016 he played in his 900th professional game.

== Playing career ==
As a youth, DiSalvatore played in the 1995 Quebec International Pee-Wee Hockey Tournament with a minor ice hockey team from Springfield, Massachusetts.

DiSalvatore was drafted in the 4th round, 104th overall, of the 2000 NHL entry draft by the San Jose Sharks from Providence College of the NCAA. After spending the 2003–04 season at the Sharks' affiliate, the Cleveland Barons, DiSalvatore was signed by the St. Louis Blues as a free agent on June 30, 2004. He was a key member of the Blues respective AHL affiliate. He played five games during the 2005–06 season for the Blues. On July 9, 2007, DiSalvatore was signed as a free agent by the Phoenix Coyotes. On July 16, 2009 DiSalvatore was signed along with Duncan Milroy to two-way contracts with the Minnesota Wild.

In the summer of 2008, he was signed by the New Jersey Devils and was assigned to affiliate the Lowell Devils. DiSalvatore was named the AHL "Player of the Week" for the period ending November 23 after scoring 2 goals and 5 assists in 3 contests.

On July 2, 2012, the Hershey Bears announced they had signed the veteran DiSalvatore to a one-year AHL contract. In his single season as an alternate captain with the Bears in 2012–13, DiSalvatore played within a top 6 scoring role, producing 18 goals and 49 points in 68 games.

A free agent, DiSalvatore agreed to his first European contract on a one-year deal with German club, EHC München of the Deutsche Eishockey Liga, on July 22, 2013. In the 2013–14 season with EHC, DiSalvatore contributed with 17 points in 22 appearances before opting to return to North America mid-season to sign an AHL contract with the Syracuse Crunch on December 16, 2013.

On August 10, 2014, DiSalvatore re-joined EHC München on a one-year contract. In his second season with the club, DiSalvatore contributed with 13 goals and 34 points in 43 games before suffering a first round exit in the post-season.

As a free agent, DiSalvatore returned to North America and after going un-signed over the summer accepted a one-year ECHL contract with the Florida Everblades on October 29, 2015. After 12 games with the Everblades in the 2015–16 season, DiSalvatore agreed to a Professional Tryout Agreement (PTO) with the Springfield Falcons of the AHL on November 26, 2015. DiSalvatore was released from his PTO on January 19, 2016 & returned to the Florida Everblades.

== Career statistics ==
=== Regular season and playoffs ===
			Regular season					Playoffs
Season	Team	League	GP	G	A	Pts	PIM	GP	G	A	Pts	PIM
1997–98	New England Jr. Coyotes	EJHL	38	24	41	65		—	—	—	—	—
1998–99	New England Jr. Coyotes	EJHL	48	44	76	120	38	—	—	—	—	—
1999–2000	Providence College	HE	38	15	12	27	12	—	—	—	—	—
2000–01	Providence College	HE	36	9	16	25	29	—	—	—	—	—
2001–02	Providence College	HE	38	16	26	42	6	—	—	—	—	—
2002–03	Providence College	HE	36	19	29	48	12	—	—	—	—	—
2003–04	Cleveland Barons	AHL	74	22	24	46	30	8	1	1	2	2
2004–05	Worcester IceCats	AHL	79	22	23	45	42	—	—	—	—	—
2005–06	Peoria Rivermen	AHL	72	22	45	67	42	4	0	0	0	0
2005–06	St. Louis Blues	NHL	5	0	0	0	2	—	—	—	—	—
2006–07	Peoria Rivermen	AHL	76	21	39	60	50	—	—	—	—	—
2007–08	San Antonio Rampage	AHL	66	22	24	46	46	7	2	1	3	9
2008–09	Lowell Devils	AHL	76	20	33	53	32	—	—	—	—	—
2009–10	Houston Aeros	AHL	79	21	31	52	28	—	—	—	—	—
2010–11	Houston Aeros	AHL	80	28	33	61	57	24	7	5	12	12
2011–12	Houston Aeros	AHL	76	28	33	61	22	4	0	0	0	2
2011–12	Minnesota Wild	NHL	1	0	0	0	2	—	—	—	—	—
2012–13	Hershey Bears	AHL	68	18	31	49	24	4	2	0	2	2
2013–14	EHC Red Bull München	DEL	22	6	11	17	12	—	—	—	—	—
2013–14	Syracuse Crunch	AHL	46	11	17	28	25	—	—	—	—	—
2014–15	EHC Red Bull München	DEL	43	13	21	34	16	4	0	1	1	2
2015–16	Florida Everblades	ECHL	42	8	16	24	6	6	2	3	5	0
2015–16	Springfield Falcons	AHL	22	1	7	8	6	—	—	—	—	—
AHL totals			814	236	340	576	404	51	12	7	19	27
NHL totals			6	0	0	0	4	—	—	—	—	—

=== International ===
Year	Team	Event	Result	GP	G	A	Pts	PIM
2001	United States	WJC	5th	7	6	3	9	2
Junior totals				7	6	3	9	2

== Awards and achievements ==
- 2001–02 HE Sportsmanship Award

Awards and achievements
Preceded by Mike Jozefowicz	Len Ceglarski Sportsmanship Award; 2001–02	Succeeded by Martin Kariya
