= Jacob Bryson =

Canadian ice hockey player (born 1997)

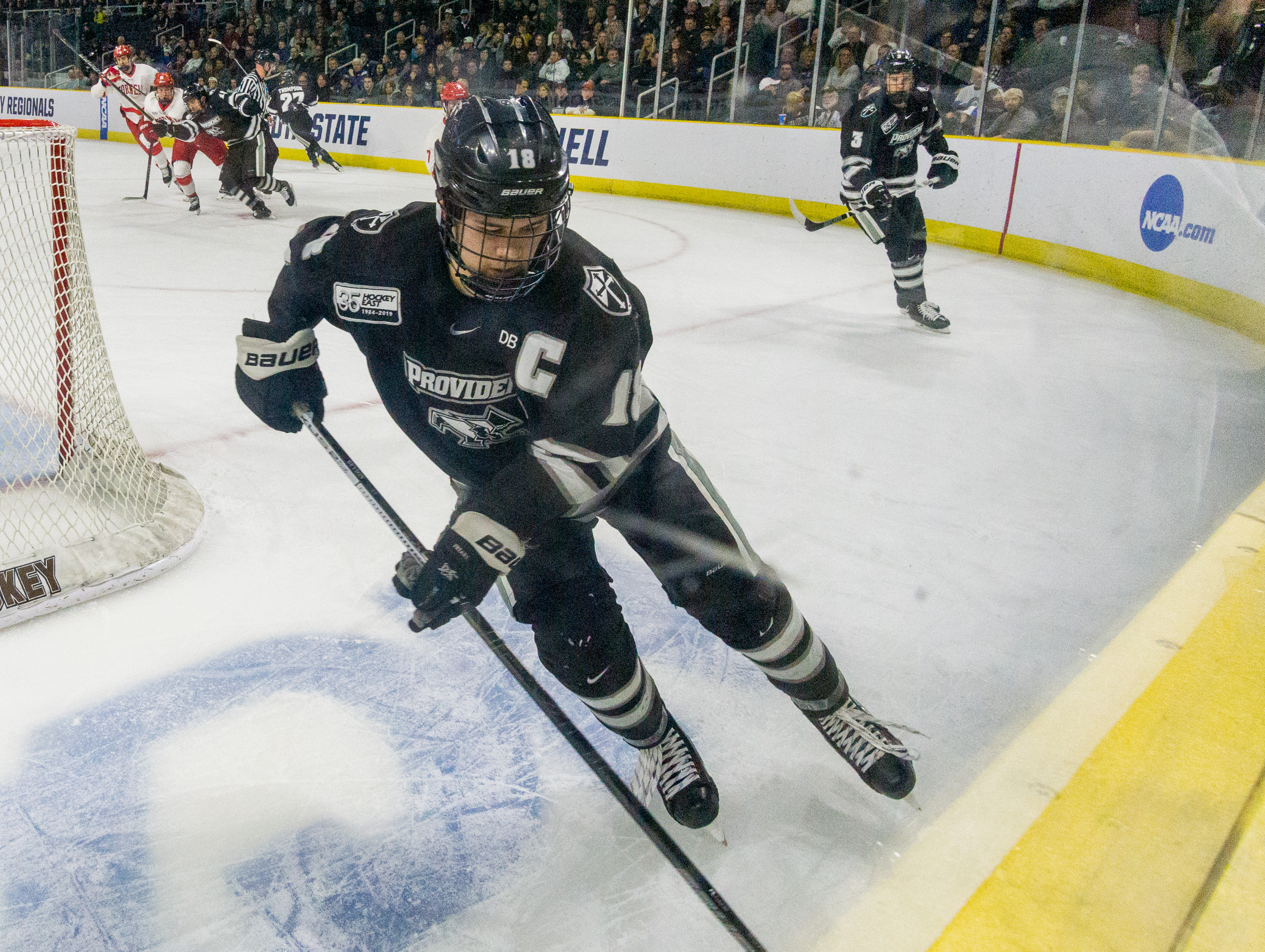
- Bryson with Providence College in 2019
- Born: November 18, 1997 (age 29) London, Ontario, Canada
- Height: 5 ft 9 in (175 cm)
- Weight: 175 lb (79 kg; 12 st 7 lb)
- Position: Defence
- Shoots: Left
- NHL team (P) Cur. team Former teams: Detroit Red Wings; Grand Rapids Griffins (AHL); Buffalo Sabres; Winnipeg Jets
- NHL draft: 99th overall, 2017; Buffalo Sabres
- Playing career: 2019–present

Jacob Bryson (born November 18, 1997) is a Canadian professional ice hockey player who is a defenceman for the Grand Rapids Griffins in the American Hockey League (AHL) while under contract to the Detroit Red Wings of the National Hockey League (NHL). He was drafted 99th overall in the 2017 NHL entry draft by the Buffalo Sabres, with whom he spent the first six seasons of his career. He played four seasons for Providence College,during which he served as team co-captain and was named to the Hockey East First Team Hockey All-Star and American Hockey Coaches Association Second-Team All-American.

== Early life ==
Bryson was born on November 18, 1997, in London, Ontario, to parents Nancy and Dean. He learned to play ice hockey through his father alongside his brother Ty and cousins Ella and Mitchell Vande Sompel.

== Playing career ==
=== Amateur ===
Growing up in London, Bryson played for numerous local teams before enrolling at Loomis Chaffee School. He played alongside his cousin on the London Gold Minor Midget AAA team and they were both named to the Minor Midget AAA All-Star Game in 2012. After being passed over in the Ontario Hockey League (OHL) Bantam Draft, Bryson played with the Jr. Knights for one season and earned an invite to the OHL's London Knights camp. During this time, he also competed in the Mass. Tier I Labor Day Tournament U18 tournament which garnered the attention of John Zavisza, the head boys hockey coach at the Loomis Chaffee School. As he was reluctant to join the OHL and give up his NCAA eligibility, Bryson competed with the Neponset Valley River Rats U18 team where he scored 12 points in 14 games. At this time, he chose to commit to playing NCAA collegiate ice hockey for the Providence Friars at Providence College.

Bryson played at the Loomis Chaffee School for one season before joining the Omaha Lancers of the United States Hockey League (USHL) for the 2015–16 season. During his time at Loomis, Bryson helped the Pelicans win the Founders League and the Avon Old Farms Hockey Christmas Classic and reach their first-ever Stuart/Corkery Elite Eight Tournament. He then joined the Lancers where he made an immediate impact on the team. By November 2015, the Lancers held a 9–6–2 record while Bryson was tied for second among USHL defencemen in scoring with one goal and 11 assists through their first 17 games. By January, Bryson led all rookie defensemen in scoring with 19 points and earned an invite to compete at the 2016 USHL/NHL Top Prospects Game. He finished the season leading all Lancer defensemen in scoring with three goals and 28 assists through 56 games. His 28 assists also led all first-year defensemen and were fourth among all rookies. He was subsequently selected for the 2015–16 USHL All-Rookie First Team. While playing for the Lancers, Bryson attended Daniel J. Gross Catholic High School in Bellevue, Nebraska.

=== College ===
Bryson played for the Providence Friars at Providence College from 2016 to 2019. There, he enrolled in the Providence College School of Business and majored in Finance. Following his freshman season, Bryson was named to the Hockey East Association's All-Academic Team for achieving a grade point average of 3.0 or better. His overall play resulted in him being drafted in the fourth round, 99th overall, by the Buffalo Sabres in the 2017 NHL entry draft. He was subsequently invited to participate in their training camp in July.

After participating in Buffalo's training camp, Bryson returned to the Friars for his sophomore season. He began the season strong by tallying assists in their first three games. While playing alongside Tommy Davis, Bryson averaged 24 minutes of ice time, including time on the power play, while maintaining five assists through the first seven games. As the season continued so did Bryson's production as he tallied three goals and a team-leading 18 assists through their first 30 games. During this time, he also recorded his first multi-goal game in a 4–3 loss to Vermont on February 4, 2018. Through the month of March, Bryson led all Hockey East defenseman with 13 assists through all conference games. His increased development earned him recognition around the league and he was subsequently named a Division I New England All-Star and Hockey East First Team Hockey All-Star, becoming the sixth Friar defenseman in franchise history to earn this recognition from the Hockey East conference. The following month, Bryson tallied career-highs in goals, assists, and points and received the Hockey East's Len Ceglarski Award. He was also selected as an American Hockey Coaches Association Second-Team All-American for the first time. Throughout the month of April, the Friars attempted to qualify for the 2018 NCAA Division I men's ice hockey tournament but fell 2–1 in a quarterfinal matchup against Notre Dame. Bryson finished his sophomore season with a team-high 21 assists and four goals while also recording eight multi-point games. He also received the teams' Michael Boback Award for most assists and the team's Ron Wilson Award as Best Defensive Player.

After returning to the Friars for his junior season, Bryson was named team co-captain with forward Kasper Björkqvist. Upon stepping into this new role, he began the season tallying 14 points through the teams' first 13 games to tie for ninth among NCAA defensemen. His production continued to match his previous seasons as he tallied three goals and 15 assists by January and recorded six multi-point games. He was subsequently nominated for the Hobey Baker Award as the top player in Division I men's hockey. Bryson finished the regular season with four goals and 24 assists through 42 games to earn a second nomination to the Hockey East's Second All-Star Team. As the team qualified for the 2019 NCAA Division I men's ice hockey tournament, he helped the Friars record six unanswered goals against the Minnesota State Mavericks to lift them to the Regional Finals against the Cornell Big Red. After the Friars shutout Cornell 4–0, they advanced to their first Frozen Four since 2015. While facing off against the University of Minnesota-Duluth Bulldogs in the Frozen Four, Bryson tallied an assist on the Friars' only goal of the game as they fell 4–1. Prior to concluding his collegiate career, Bryson was again named to the Hockey East All-Academic Team.

=== Professional ===
Upon concluding his junior season at Providence, Bryson signed a three-year entry-level contract with the Sabres but joined their American Hockey League (AHL) affiliate, the Rochester Americans, on an amateur tryout for the 2019–20 season. He began his rookie season playing alongside Zach Redmond and tallying 10 assists through their first 34 games. His defensive partner would praise his skill by saying: "He’s definitely got some top-end speed, kind of got a lot of the tools that come along with that new age defenseman." By February, Bryson ranked sixth among all first-year defensemen with a plus-11 rating while also tying for ninth among all rookie defensemen with 21 points through 54 games. His play as a rookie earned him praise from coach Ralph Krueger who described him as being "our strongest defenseman in Rochester." Before the league postponed games due to the COVID-19 pandemic, Bryson scored his only four goals of the season during the final 10 games. He finished the regular-season with four goals and 23 assists through 61 games.

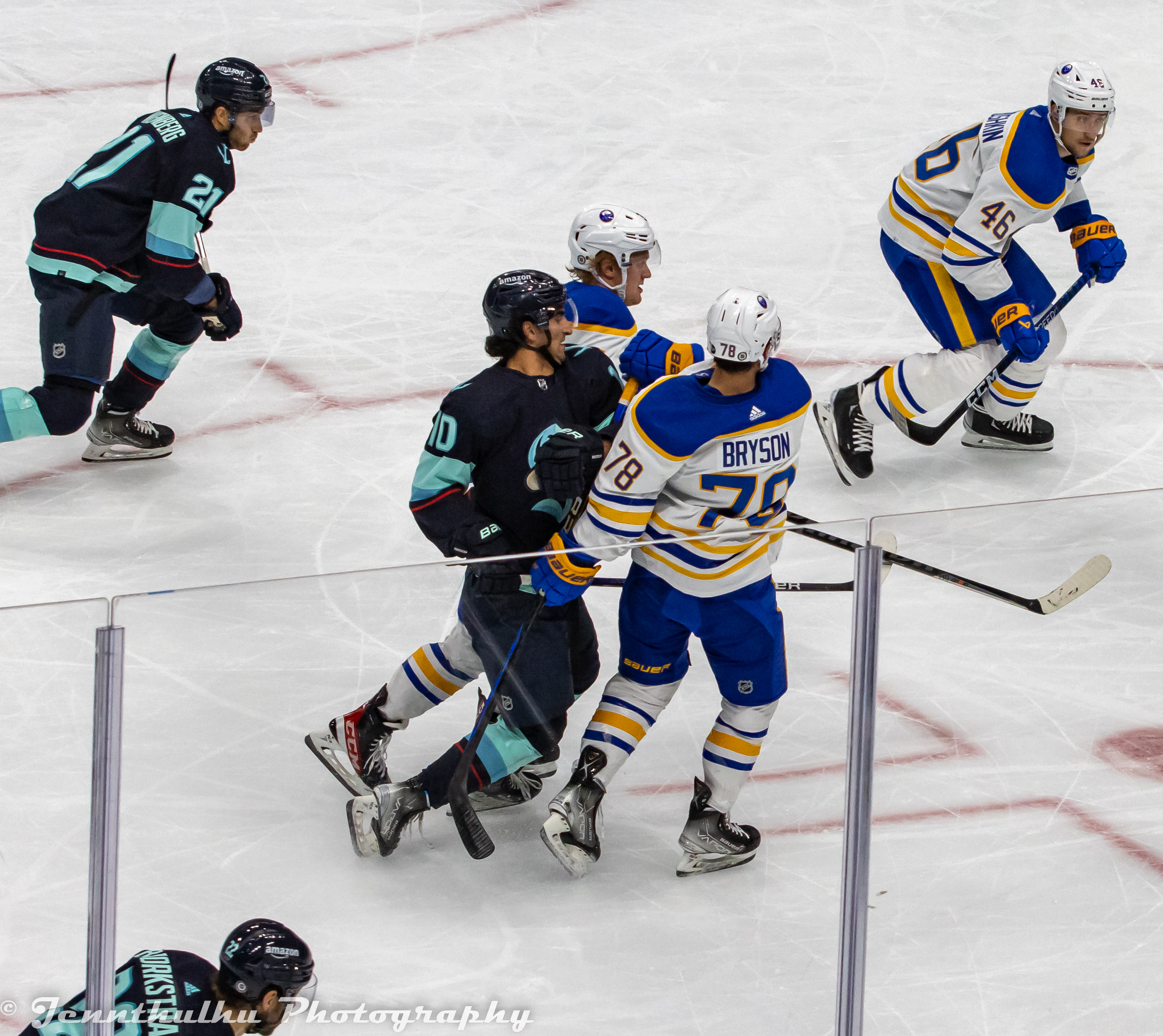
Bryson in action against the Seattle Kraken in 2022.

Once the NHL resumed play for the 2020–21 season, Bryson participated in the Sabres' training camp. Although he was re-assigned to the Americans to begin the 2020–21 season, Bryson was recalled to the Sabres' Taxi squad on February 13, 2021. These squads were composed of reserve players on hand to prevent any team from playing short due to players entering COVID-19 protocols. At the time of re-assignment, Bryson had accumulated one assist through three games. He subsequently made his NHL debut with the Sabres on February 23, 2021, for a game against the New Jersey Devils. During the 4–1 win, Bryson was on the ice of 17:42 minutes, including a team-high 7:24 in the first period. He was re-assigned back to the Taxi squad prior to the Sabres' 3–0 loss to the Philadelphia Flyers on February 28. Bryson was recalled to the NHL level again on March 2, while Casey Mittelstadt was loaned to the Taxi squad. Upon re-joining the team, Bryson again earned praise from the Sabres' head coach who said he was pleased with the defenceman's puck management, poise, and mobility. As such, he earned more playing time on the penalty kill and skated a career-high 24:10 in his fifth NHL game. Bryson then scored his first NHL goal on March 6, 2021, in a 5–2 loss to the New York Islanders. He became the third player in Sabres history to score their first NHL goal in the opening minute of a game. He quickly began averaging 19:45 of ice time per game before being re-assigned to the Taxi squad on March 18.

On March 6, 2026, Bryson was traded to the Winnipeg Jets, alongside Isak Rosen, a conditional 2026 4th-round pick, and a 2027 second-round pick, in exchange for Luke Schenn and Logan Stanley.

Having concluded his contract with the Jets, Bryson brief tenure with the club ended as he left as a free agent to sign a one-year, $850,000 contract with the Detroit Red Wings for the 2026–27 season on July 1, 2026.

== Career statistics ==
| | | | Regular season | | | | | Playoffs |
| Season | Team | League | GP | G | A | Pts | PIM | GP | G | A | Pts | PIM |
|---|---|---|---|---|---|---|---|---|---|---|---|---|
| 2014–15 | Loomis Chaffee School | USHS | 27 | 5 | 10 | 15 | 8 | — | — | — | — | — |
| 2015–16 | Omaha Lancers | USHL | 56 | 3 | 28 | 31 | 36 | — | — | — | — | — |
| 2016–17 | Providence College | HE | 39 | 3 | 17 | 20 | 12 | — | — | — | — | — |
| 2017–18 | Providence College | HE | 40 | 4 | 21 | 25 | 18 | — | — | — | — | — |
| 2018–19 | Providence College | HE | 42 | 4 | 24 | 28 | 8 | — | — | — | — | — |
| 2019–20 | Rochester Americans | AHL | 61 | 4 | 23 | 27 | 34 | — | — | — | — | — |
| 2020–21 | Rochester Americans | AHL | 5 | 0 | 3 | 3 | 2 | — | — | — | — | — |
| 2020–21 | Buffalo Sabres | NHL | 38 | 1 | 8 | 9 | 12 | — | — | — | — | — |
| 2021–22 | Buffalo Sabres | NHL | 73 | 1 | 9 | 10 | 12 | — | — | — | — | — |
| 2022–23 | Buffalo Sabres | NHL | 59 | 1 | 8 | 9 | 8 | — | — | — | — | — |
| 2023–24 | Rochester Americans | AHL | 10 | 0 | 3 | 3 | 2 | — | — | — | — | — |
| 2023–24 | Buffalo Sabres | NHL | 36 | 1 | 7 | 8 | 8 | — | — | — | — | — |
| 2024–25 | Buffalo Sabres | NHL | 48 | 0 | 7 | 7 | 10 | — | — | — | — | — |
| 2025–26 | Buffalo Sabres | NHL | 35 | 3 | 2 | 5 | 8 | — | — | — | — | — |
| 2025–26 | Winnipeg Jets | NHL | 15 | 0 | 3 | 3 | 2 | — | — | — | — | — |
| NHL totals | | | 304 | 6 | 45 | 51 | 60 | — | — | — | — | — |

Awards and achievements
| Preceded by Joe Gambardella | Len Ceglarski Sportsmanship Award; 2017–18, 2018–19 | Succeeded by Benjamin Freeman |
