= Tomáš Kucharčík =

Czech ice hockey player

- Born: May 10, 1970 (age 56) Vlašim, Czechoslovakia
- Height: 6 ft 2 in (188 cm)
- Weight: 198 lb (90 kg; 14 st 2 lb)
- Position: Centre
- Shot: Left
- Played for: HC Dukla Jihlava; HC Plzeň; St. John's Maple Leafs; HC Slavia Praha; Ässät; HPK; Orli Znojmo; Leksands IF; HC Forward-Morges; HC Ambrì-Piotta; Lukko; HK Nitra; VHK Vsetín; WSV Sterzing Broncos; EHC Freiburg; SV Kaltern
- National team: Czech Republic
- NHL draft: 167th overall, 1991; Toronto Maple Leafs
- Playing career: 1990–2014

Tomáš Kucharčík (born May 10, 1970) is a Czech former professional ice hockey player. He was selected by the Toronto Maple Leafs in the 8th round (167th overall) of the 1991 NHL entry draft.

Kucharčík played for the gold medal-winning Czech Republic team at the 1999 IIHF World Championship.

== Career statistics ==
=== Regular season and playoffs ===
			Regular season					Playoffs
Season	Team	League	GP	G	A	Pts	PIM	GP	G	A	Pts	PIM
1987–88	TJ Auto Škoda Mladá Boleslav	CZE.2	—	1	—	—	—	—	—	—	—	—
1988–89	TJ Auto Škoda Mladá Boleslav	CZE.2	—	6	—	—	—	—	—	—	—	—
1989–90	TJ Vodní stavby Tábor	CZE.2	33	10	20	30	—	—	—	—	—	—
1990–91	ASD Dukla Jihlava	TCH	23	7	6	13	6	—	—	—	—	—
1991–92	ASD Dukla Jihlava	TCH	37	14	17	31	22	—	—	—	—	—
1992–93	ASD Dukla Jihlava	TCH	36	17	17	34	18	—	—	—	—	—
1993–94	HC Škoda Plzeň	ELH	33	10	13	23	12	—	—	—	—	—
1993–94	St. John's Maple Leafs	AHL	8	2	3	5	4	10	3	4	7	2
1994–95	HC Interconex Plzeň	ELH	40	14	4	18	24	3	0	0	0	14
1995–96	HC ZKZ Plzeň	ELH	17	5	7	12	14	—	—	—	—	—
1995–96	HC Slavia Praha	ELH	22	5	9	14	37	7	3	2	5	16
1996–97	HC Slavia Praha	ELH	49	14	27	41	16	3	0	1	1	6
1997–98	HC Slavia Praha	ELH	48	14	19	33	34	5	3	2	5	0
1998–99	HC Slavia Praha	ELH	52	15	32	47	82	—	—	—	—	—
1999–2000	HC Slavia Praha	ELH	49	11	18	29	24	—	—	—	—	—
2000–01	Ässät	SM-l	54	9	17	26	50	—	—	—	—	—
2001–02	HPK	SM-l	54	15	26	41	40	8	3	4	7	24
2002–03	HPK	SM-l	52	28	27	55	48	13	2	4	6	8
2003–04	HPK	SM-l	54	13	17	30	64	8	0	4	4	4
2004–05	HC JME Znojemští Orli	ELH	17	0	4	4	8	—	—	—	—	—
2004–05	Leksands IF	SWE.2	12	4	7	11	10	10	4	2	6	16
2005–06	Forward Morges HC	SUI.2	20	5	10	15	52	—	—	—	—	—
2005–06	HC Ambrì–Piotta	NLA	2	2	0	2	2	—	—	—	—	—
2005–06	Lukko	SM-l	16	4	4	8	16	—	—	—	—	—
2006–07	HK Dynamax - Oil Nitra	SVK	14	1	4	5	24	—	—	—	—	—
2006–07	Vsetínská hokejová	ELH	6	0	0	0	4	—	—	—	—	—
2006–07	WSV Sterzing Broncos	ITA.2	18	12	23	35	—	—	—	—	—	—
2007–08	HC Benešov	CZE.3	11	5	6	11	20	—	—	—	—	—
2007–08	Wölfe Freiburg	DEU.3	37	21	42	63	56	10	3	5	8	45
2008–09	Wölfe Freiburg	DEU.2	47	6	24	30	74	2	0	0	0	2
2009–10	HC Benešov	CZE.3	4	4	4	8	4	—	—	—	—	—
2009–10	SV Kaltern	ITA.2	21	9	28	37	12	4	1	1	2	8
2010–11	SV Kaltern	ITA.2	28	13	23	36	28	11	6	6	12	12
2012–13	HC Samina Rankweil	SUI.6	3	1	6	7	0	—	—	—	—	—
TCH totals			96	38	40	78	46	—	—	—	—	—
ELH totals			333	88	133	221	255	29	12	8	20	38
SM-l totals			230	69	91	160	218	29	5	12	17	36

=== International ===
Year	Team	Event	GP	G	A	Pts	PIM
1999	Czech Republic	WC	4	0	0	0	0
Senior totals			4	0	0	0	0

Preceded by Janne Ojanen	Winner of the Veli-Pekka Ketola trophy 2002–03	Succeeded by Timo Pärssinen
Preceded by Vesa Viitakoski	Winner of the Aarne Honkavaara trophy 2002–03	Succeeded by Timo Pärssinen
