= Noriko Kariya =

Canadian boxer

Personal information
- Nationality: Canadian
- Born: 12 June 1979 (age 47) Vancouver, British Columbia, Canada
- Height: 5 ft 1 in (1.55 m)
- Weight: Lightweight

Boxing career
- Stance: Orthodox

Boxing record
- Total fights: 11
- Wins: 9
- Losses: 3
- Draws: 1

Noriko Ann Kariya (born June 12, 1979) is a Canadian professional female boxer.

== Biography ==
Noriko Kariya grew up interested in becoming a hockey player. Her brothers, Steve Kariya, Martin Kariya, and Paul Kariya, whom she looked up to as a child, were professional hockey players. When Kariya moved to the United States to study at the University of Maine, she became a member of the women's field hockey team, and joined the local boxing gym to keep in shape.

Kariya's presence at the gym was difficult for the gym's other patrons; many felt uncomfortable with having a woman train next to them. Kariya did not feel welcome but came to love the sport of boxing and wanted to pursue it as a career. Kariya moved to Jersey City, New Jersey, where she began training with Mike Skowronski and Teddy Cruz, who have also worked with Arturo Gatti.

In May 2006, a photo of Kariya, with the nickname "Lady Bang", appeared on Ring Magazine. The nickname is a spin-off from her brother, Paul's, winning of the Lady Byng Memorial Trophy in both 1996 and 1997 for the most gentlemanly player of the year.

== Amateur career ==
Noriko Kariya had ten amateur bouts, winning 9 and losing 1.

== Professional career ==
Kariya debuted as a bantamweight fighter on May 29, 2005, beating Cindy Christian by a four-round decision at Hull, Quebec. Her next fight, and her first professional bout outside of Canada, took place on August 19 of the same year. She defeated Camille Casson in Whippany, New Jersey by another four-round decision.

On January 28, 2006, Kariya defeated Maria Contreras on points at Atlantic City, and on May 24, 2006, she fought the undefeated Amanda Knight in New York City. The bout was declared a draw (tie) after four rounds, and both women remained undefeated. On December 13, 2007, Kariya fought Salina Jordan at the Roseland Ballroom with a third round referee decision of Kariya being the outright winner. A punch at the end of the first round by Kariya broke Salina Jordan's cheekbone.

Kariya has 9 wins, 3 losses and 1 draw, with 2 knockout wins.

== Professional boxing record ==
13 fights	9 wins	3 losses
By knockout	2	1
By decision	7	2
Draws	1	

No.	Result	Record	Opponent	Type	Round, time	Date	Location	Notes
13	Loss	9–3–1	(United States) Ava Knight	KO	5, 0:20	Jul 31, 2008	(United States) Schuetzen Park, North Bergen, New Jersey, USA	
12	Win	9–2–1	(United States) Jessica Mohs	UD	5, 2:00	Apr 30, 2008	River Rock Casino, Richmond, Canada	
11	Win	8–2–1	(United States) Salina Jordan	TKO	3, 0:28	Dec 13, 2007	(United States) Roseland Ballroom, New York, USA	
10	Win	7–2–1	(United States) Dawn Reynolds	UD	4, 2:00	Oct 18, 2007	(United States) Hammerstein Ballroom, New York, USA	
9	Loss	6–2–1	(United States) Eileen Olszewski	SD	6, 2:00	Feb 17, 2007	(United States) Hammerstein Ballroom, New York, USA	
8	Win	6–1–1	(United States) Elisha Olivas	UD	6, 2:00	Nov 15, 2006	(United States) The Grand Ballroom, New York, USA	
7	Win	5–1–1	(United States) Michelle Herron	UD	4, 2:00	Aug 5, 2006	(United States) Madison Square Garden, New York, USA	
6	Win	4–1–1	(United States) Kerri Hill	TKO	3, 1:07	Jun 10, 2006	(United States) Madison Square Garden, New York, USA	
5	Draw	3–1–1	(United States) Amanda Knight	PTS	4, 2:00	May 24, 2006	(United States) Hammerstein Ballroom, New York, USA	
4	Loss	3–1	(United Kingdom) Suzannah Warner	MD	4, 2:00	Mar 18, 2006	(United States) Boardwalk Hall, Atlantic City, New Jersey, USA	
3	Win	3–0	(Mexico) Maria Contreras	UD	4, 2:00	Jan 28, 2006	(United States) Boardwalk Hall, Atlantic City, New Jersey, USA	
2	Win	2–0	(United States) Camille Casson	UD	4, 2:00	Aug 19, 2005	(United States) Hanover Marriott, Whippany, USA	
1	Win	1–0	(United States) Cindy Christian	MD	4, 2:00	May 28, 2005	Casino Lac Leamy, Hull, Canada	
