= Veli-Pekka Ketola trophy =

Finnish ice hockey award

Veli-Pekka Ketola Trophy
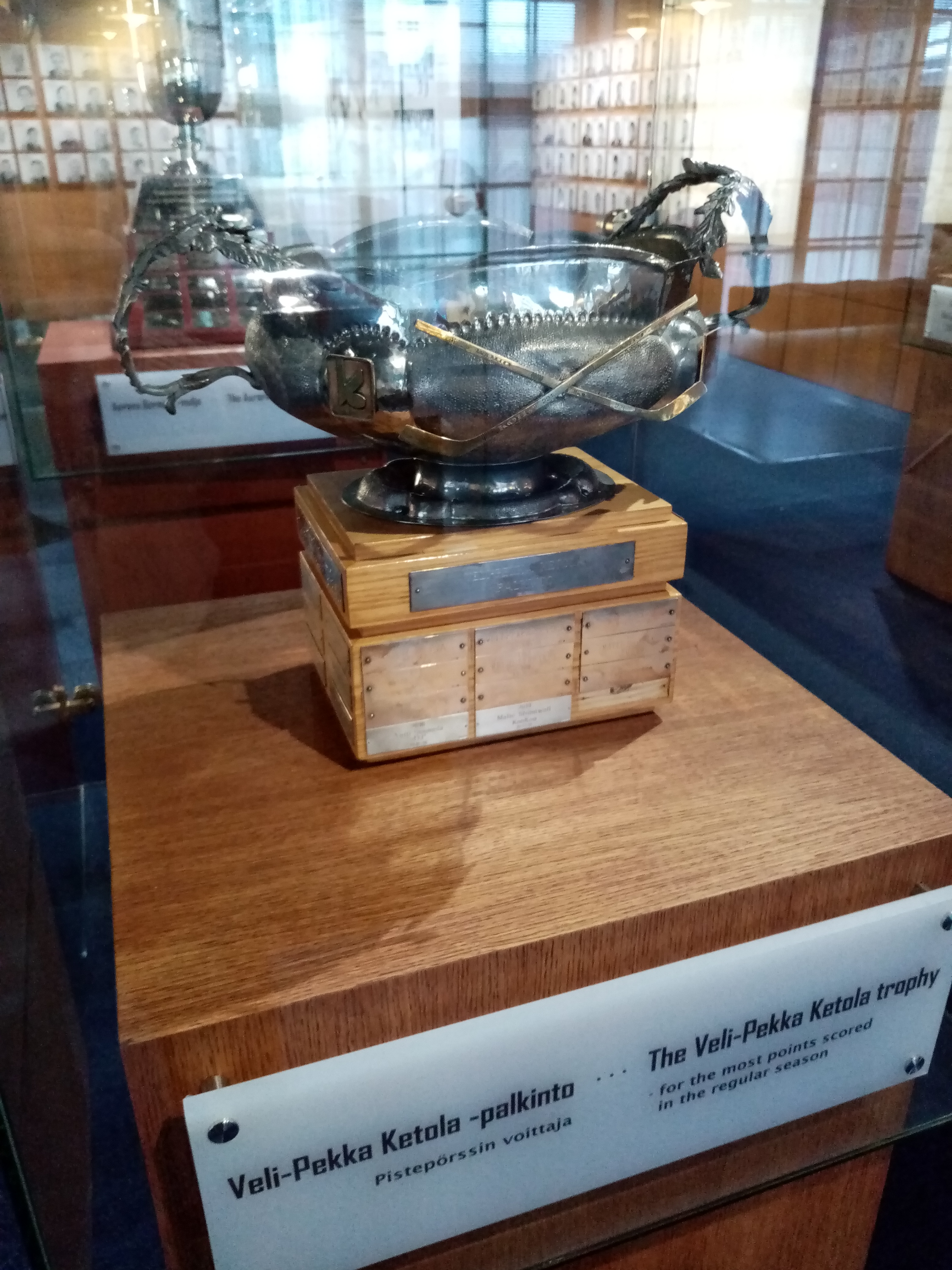
- Sport: Ice hockey
- League: Liiga
- Awarded for: Most points in the Liiga regular season
- Local name: Veli-Pekka Ketola -palkinto (Finnish)
- Country: Finland
- Presented by: Liiga

History
- First award: 1978
- Editions: 44
- First winner: Henry Saleva
- Most wins: Matti Hagman (4)
- Most recent: Oula Palve

The Veli-Pekka Ketola trophy (Finnish: Veli-Pekka Ketola -palkinto) is a Finnish ice hockey trophy awarded by the Liiga to the player who scores the most points during regular season play. It was first awarded to Henry Saleva of Kärpät in the 1977–78 SM-liiga season. The trophy was renamed in honour of Veli-Pekka Ketola in 1995.

The trophy has overwhelmingly been won by Finns, foreign players have won the award just nine times since 1978. Matti Hagman holds the record for most titles, with four. To date, Canadians Steve Kariya and Martin Kariya are the only two brothers to win the title.

== Winners ==
Season	Team	Player	Points	Citizenship
1977–78	Kärpät	Henry Saleva	25 + 35 = 60	Finland
1978–79	Ässät	Veli-Pekka Ketola	23 + 49 = 72	Finland
1979–80	HIFK	Matti Hagman	37 + 50 = 87	Finland
1980–81	TPS	Reijo Leppänen	31 + 45 = 76	Finland
1981–82	TPS	Reijo Leppänen (2)	33 + 37 = 70	Finland
1982–83	HIFK	Matti Hagman (2)	23 + 41 = 64	Finland
1983–84	HIFK	Matti Hagman (3)	22 + 47 = 69	Finland
1984–85	HIFK	Matti Hagman (4)	23 + 44 = 67	Finland
1985–86	Ässät	Arto Javanainen	44 + 27 =71	Finland
1986–87	Kärpät	Kari Jalonen	29 + 63 = 93*	Finland
1987–88	TPS	Esa Keskinen	14 + 55 = 69	Finland
1988–89	Ilves	Raimo Summanen	35 + 46 = 81	Finland
1989–90	Ilves	Raimo Summanen (2)	39 + 31 = 70	Finland
1990–91	HPK	Teppo Kivelä	23 + 50 = 73	Finland
1991–92	TPS	Mikko Mäkelä	25 + 45 = 70	Finland
1992–93	TPS	Esa Keskinen (2)	16 + 43 = 59	Finland
1993–94	TPS	Esa Keskinen (3)	23 + 47 = 74	Finland
1994–95	TPS	Saku Koivu	27 + 47 = 74	Finland
1995–96	Lukko	Juha Riihijärvi	28 + 44 = 72	Finland
1996–97	Jokerit	Petri Varis	36 + 23 = 59	Finland
1997–98	Ilves	Peter Larsson	19 + 39 = 58	Sweden
1998–99	HIFK	Jan Čaloun	24 + 57 = 81	Czech Republic
1999–00	TPS	Kai Nurminen	41 + 37 = 78	Finland
2000–01	Jokerit	Petri Varis (2)	27 + 43 = 70	Finland
2001–02	Tappara	Janne Ojanen	20 + 41 = 61	Finland
2002–03	HPK	Tomáš Kucharčík	28 + 27 = 55	Czech Republic
2003–04	HIFK	Timo Pärssinen	32 + 30 = 62	Finland
2004–05	Ilves	Steve Kariya	24 + 35 = 59	Canada
2005–06	HIFK	Tony Salmelainen	27 + 28 = 55	Finland
2006–07	Blues	Martin Kariya	18 + 43 = 61	Canada
2007–08	Kärpät	Janne Pesonen	34 + 44 = 78	Finland
2008–09	HIFK	Kim Hirschovits	18 + 48 = 66	Finland
2009–10	Tappara	Jori Lehterä	19 + 50 = 69	Finland
2010–11	Lukko	Perttu Lindgren	23 + 42 = 66	Finland
2011–12	Pelicans	Ryan Lasch	24 + 38 = 62	United States
2012–13	Kärpät	Juha-Pekka Haataja	28 + 31 = 59	Finland
2013–14	Lukko	Ville Vahalahti	20 + 32 = 52	Finland
2014–15	Blues	Kim Hirschovits (2)	13 + 45 = 58	Finland
2015–16	Tappara	Kristian Kuusela	20 + 39 = 59	Finland
2016–17	Tappara	Henrik Haapala	15 + 45 = 60	Finland
2017–18	JYP	Antti Suomela	21 + 39 = 60	Finland
2018–19	KooKoo	Malte Strömwall	30 + 27 = 57	Sweden
2019–20	Lukko	Justin Danforth	27 + 33 = 60	Canada
2020–21	HPK	Petri Kontiola	14 + 41 = 55	Finland
2021–22	Tappara	Anton Levtchi	26 + 35 = 61	Finland
2022-23	HPK	Michael Joly	25 + 39 = 64	Canada
2023-24	Ilves	Oula Palve	20 + 44 = 64	Finland
2024-25	Sport	Atro Leppänen	21 + 42 = 63	Finland
2025-26	Tappara	Benjamin Rautiainen	25 + 52 = 77	Finland

* Liiga single-season point record
