= Joe Gambardella =

American ice hockey player (born 1993)

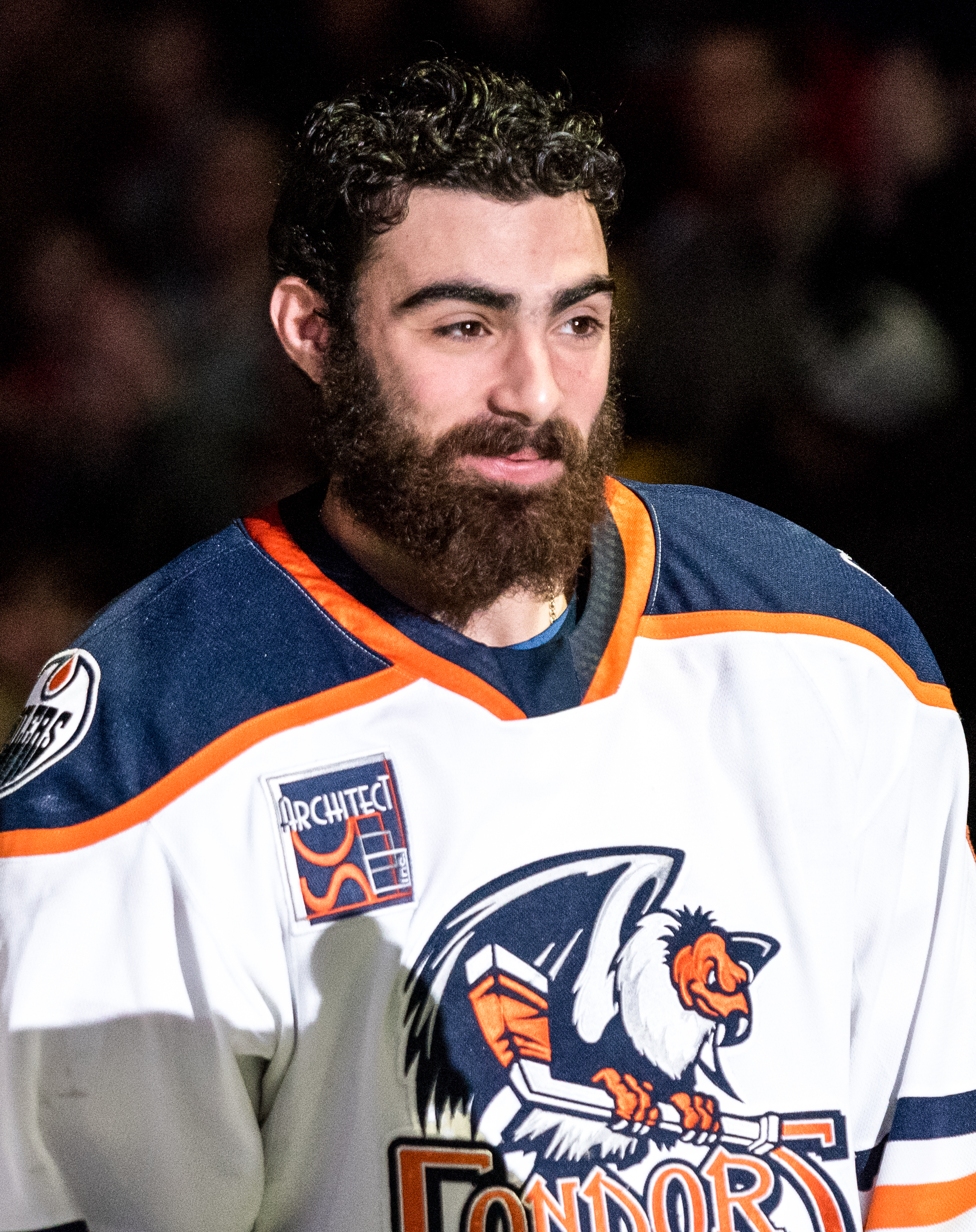
- Gambardella with the Bakersfield Condors in 2019
- Born: December 1, 1993 (age 32) Staten Island, New York, U.S.
- Height: 5 ft 10 in (178 cm)
- Weight: 196 lb (89 kg; 14 st 0 lb)
- Position: Center
- Shot: Left
- Played for: Edmonton Oilers
- NHL draft: Undrafted
- Playing career: 2017–2025

Joseph Gabriel Gambardella (born December 1, 1993) is an American former professional ice hockey center. He attended the University of Massachusetts–Lowell where he played college ice hockey and was a business major. Undrafted into the NHL, Gambardella signed an entry-level contract with the Edmonton Oilers in 2017.

== Playing career ==
While playing at Monsignor Farrell High School during the 2009–10 season, Gambardella was selected as an Advance All-Star. He chose to forgo his senior year at Farrell and try out for a junior team. He joined the New Jersey Rockets in the Atlantic Junior Hockey League under coach Bob Thornton who also worked for the United States Hockey League. On Thornton's request, Gambardella tried out for the Des Moines Buccaneers midway through the 2011–12 season and made the team.

In his second season with the Buccaneers, and his first full season with the team, Gambardella was named an alternate captain and announced his commitment to the University of Massachusetts Lowell in December 2012. During this season, Gambardella was hit in the face with a puck causing a broken left cheek, sinus and orbital bones and a cut that required stitches. He finished the game but was forced to miss 5 weeks to recover from required surgery. He ended the season with 36 points in 48 games.

=== Collegiate ===
Enrolled as a business major at the University of Massachusetts–Lowell, Gambardella played in 41 games his freshman season. He competed in the 2014 NCAA Division I Men's Ice Hockey Tournament but Massachusetts–Lowell lost to Boston College in the Northeast Region.

In his sophomore year, Gambardella set a new career-high 30 points in 38 games. As the River Hawks competed in the 2015 Hockey East playoffs, Gambardella had a five-game point run. He ended the season tied for first nationally with three shorthanded goals.

On September 30, 2016, Gambardella was named an alternate captain for the River Hawks prior to his Junior year. In his junior year, Gambardella competed in all 40 games of the season as the River Hawks made another playoff push. He ended the season with 27 assists which ranked fourth in the conference and second on the roster with a career-high 37 points. He was awarded the Len Ceglarski Sportsmanship Award and the Gus Coutu Award as the player who best exemplifies the spirit of the UMass Lowell Hockey program.

Gambardella concluded his senior season by becoming the first University of Massachusetts–Lowell player to be awarded the Walter Brown Award as the top American-born college player in New England. He was also awarded the Len Ceglarski Sportsmanship Award for the second time and was named to the Hockey East Second Team All-Star and Hockey East All-Tournament Team. On March 28, 2017, Gambardella concluded his collegiate career by signing a two-year entry-level contract with the Edmonton Oilers for the 2017–18 season. On April 3, 2017, the Edmonton Oilers American Hockey League affiliate, the Bakersfield Condors, signed Gambardella to an amateur try-out agreement to conclude the 2016–17 season with them.

=== Professional ===
Gambardella made his professional debut with the Condors on April 5, 2017, against the Texas Stars. He scored a goal and an assist in his debut however the Condors lost 4–3. He ended his season with the Condors playing in six games and scoring three points.

On September 21, 2017, Gambardella was cut from the Oilers 2017 training camp and reassigned to the Condors to begin the 2017–18 season. He played the entire season with the Condors, scoring 19 points in 50 games.

Gambardella reported to the Oilers training camp the following season, and was again reassigned to the Condors for the 2018–19 AHL season. On December 30, 2018, Gambardella earned his first NHL recall after playing in 28 games and collecting 21 points. He made his NHL debut with the Oilers on December 31, 2018, in a 4–3 loss to the Winnipeg Jets. He appeared in 15 games with the Oilers that season.

On May 29, 2019, the Oilers re-signed Gambardella to a two-year contract extension, assigning him to the Condors, where he played the 2018–19 and 2020–21 seasons.

Following his fifth season within the Oilers organization, Gambardella signed as a free agent closer to home in agreeing to a two-year, two-way contract with the New Jersey Devils on July 29, 2021. The Devils assigned him to their AHL affiliate, the Utica Comets.

On May 19, 2023, Gambardella signed a two-year contract with the Comets.

In October 2025, Gambardella announced his retirement from professional hockey.

== Personal life ==
While playing hockey in college, Gambardella started a youth hockey training sideline when parents would ask him to work with their kids. The sideline grew into a business called Stride to Greatness, based in Somerset, New Jersey, where the local twin-arena was renamed the Joe Gambardella Training Centre.

Gambardella's younger brother Christopher also played junior hockey in the AtJHL and USHL.

== Career statistics ==
			Regular season					Playoffs
Season	Team	League	GP	G	A	Pts	PIM	GP	G	A	Pts	PIM
2010–11	New Jersey Rockets	AtJHL	3	0	1	1	0	—	—	—	—	—
2011–12	New Jersey Rockets	AtJHL	24	21	7	28	25	—	—	—	—	—
2011–12	Des Moines Buccaneers	USHL	31	4	5	9	2	—	—	—	—	—
2012–13	Des Moines Buccaneers	USHL	48	15	21	36	26	—	—	—	—	—
2013–14	University of Massachusetts Lowell	HE	41	5	5	10	8	—	—	—	—	—
2014–15	University of Massachusetts Lowell	HE	38	14	16	30	6	—	—	—	—	—
2015–16	University of Massachusetts Lowell	HE	40	10	27	37	2	—	—	—	—	—
2016–17	University of Massachusetts Lowell	HE	41	18	34	52	22	—	—	—	—	—
2016–17	Bakersfield Condors	AHL	6	1	2	3	0	—	—	—	—	—
2017–18	Bakersfield Condors	AHL	50	13	6	19	16	—	—	—	—	—
2018–19	Bakersfield Condors	AHL	50	29	19	48	19	10	6	4	10	0
2018–19	Edmonton Oilers	NHL	15	0	3	3	2	—	—	—	—	—
2019–20	Bakersfield Condors	AHL	50	14	14	28	11	—	—	—	—	—
2020–21	Bakersfield Condors	AHL	27	6	7	13	11	—	—	—	—	—
2021–22	Utica Comets	AHL	65	10	21	31	30	5	1	2	3	0
2022–23	Utica Comets	AHL	59	10	25	35	4	6	0	1	1	0
2023–24	Utica Comets	AHL	61	9	20	29	7	—	—	—	—	—
2024–25	Utica Comets	AHL	48	6	12	18	6	—	—	—	—	—
NHL totals			15	0	3	3	2	—	—	—	—	—

== Awards and honors ==
Award	Year	Ref
College
Len Ceglarski Award	2016, 2017	
Walter Brown Award	2017	
All-Hockey East Second Team	2017	
All Tournament Team	2017	

Awards and achievements
Preceded by Michael Sit	Len Ceglarski Sportsmanship Award; 2015–16, 2016–17	Succeeded by Jacob Bryson
