= Martin Kariya =

Canadian hockey player

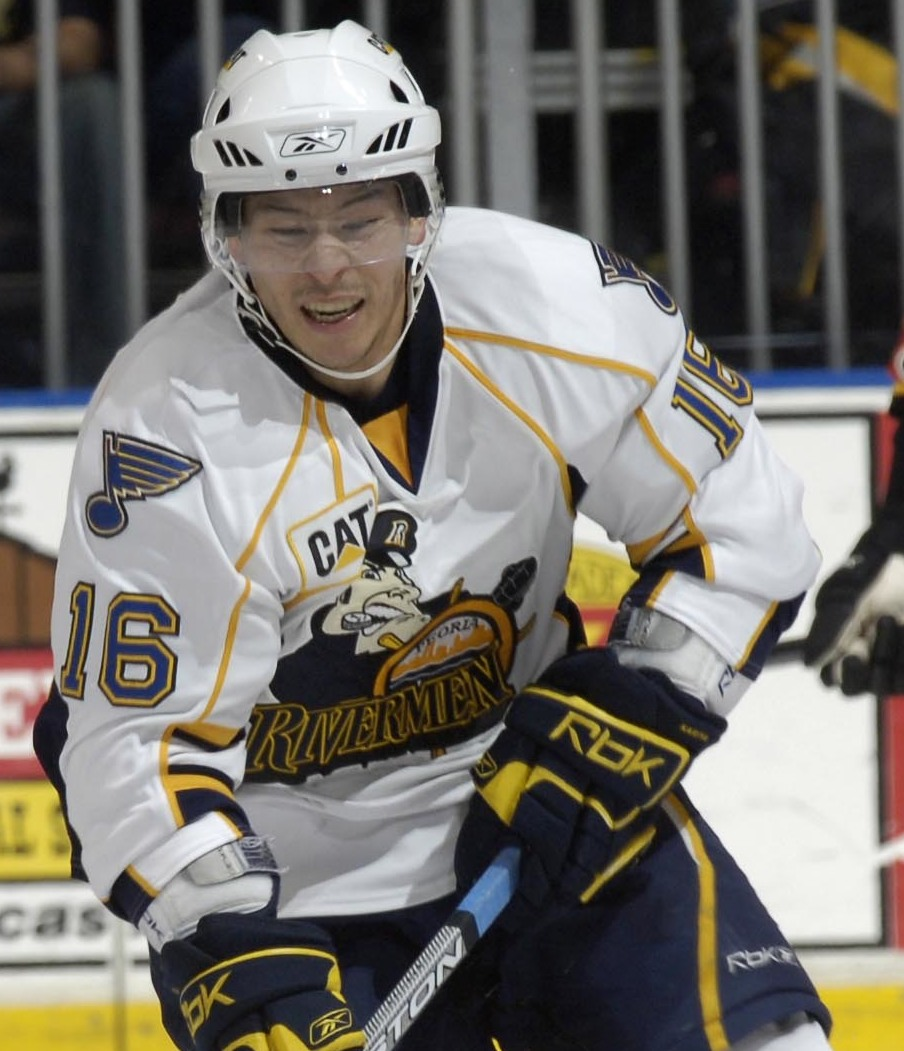
- Kariya with the Peoria Rivermen in 2007
- Born: October 5, 1981 (age 44) Vancouver, British Columbia, Canada
- Height: 5 ft 9 in (175 cm)
- Weight: 175 lb (79 kg; 12 st 7 lb)
- Position: Forward
- Shot: Right
- NLA team Former teams: HC Ambri-Piotta; SCL Tigers; AHL; Portland Pirates; Bridgeport Sound Tigers; Peoria Rivermen; SM-l; Espoo Blues; KHL; Dinamo Riga
- National team: Canada
- NHL draft: Undrafted
- Playing career: 2003–2012

Martin Tetsuya Kariya (born October 5, 1981) is a Canadian former professional ice hockey right winger. He is the youngest brother of former NHL players Paul Kariya and Steve Kariya.

== Playing career ==
=== Amateur ===
Kariya had a standout NCAA college hockey career at the University of Maine from 1999 to 2003 while earning a degree in Mathematics. During his four years at the University of Maine, the team made 2 Frozen Four appearances. In Martin's junior college season the Black Bears reached the 2001–02 NCAA Men's Ice Hockey Championship final game where they suffered a disappointing 4-3 OT loss to the University of Minnesota. Martin was the captain of the team in his senior year and was also the top scorer with 50 points in 39 games. Martin was awarded the Len Ceglarski Sportsmanship Award and named to Hockey East First All-Star Team. He finished his Black Bear career 11th in all-time scoring with 155 points and was subsequently named in Maine's All Decade Team.

=== Professional ===
Kariya's outstanding college hockey career caught the attention of the Portland Pirates of the AHL, who offered him a contract to join their team for the 2002–03 playoffs. On July 22, 2003, Martin then signed with the New York Islanders affiliate, the Bridgeport Sound Tigers for the 2003–04 season.

The 2004 NHL Lockout was a bump in the road for Kariya. Rather than waiting for the NHL season to resume, Martin headed to Japan to play for the Nikko IceBucks in the Asian Hockey League where he was a favorite with Japanese hockey fans. Next he played in Fredrikstad Norway for Stjernen HC and recorded 52 points in 39 games. This caught the attention of hockey scouts from Europe's top leagues and led to Martin signing with the Espoo Blues of the Finnish SM-liiga for the 2006-2007 season. Martin's speed and skill helped him to dominate the Finnish league. He was the top scorer with 61 points in 51 games and was considered the best forward in the league that season.

After his great success in Europe, Martin signed his first NHL contract with the St. Louis Blues on June 1, 2007, for the following 2007–08 season. On October 1, 2007, Kariya was among the final cuts as he was assigned to affiliate, the Peoria Rivermen. Kariya enjoyed his most successful season in the AHL recording 53 points in 71 games.

For the 2008–09 season he returned to Europe to play in the lucrative Swiss League where he finished 5th in the league's scoring standings and was a key player for the SCL Tigers. On July 15, 2009, Kariya signed with the Dinamo Riga of the KHL. In the 2009–10 season, Martin established himself as an integral part of Riga's offense scoring 22 points in 38 games. Kariya was limited to 38 games after suffering a well publicized concussion in which the KHL was criticized over the immediate medical protocol to his condition. Upon his return, Kariya helped Riga past the first round in the playoffs, leading the KHL with 5 points in 4 games against SKA St. Petersburg after the first round.

On May 3, 2010, Kariya returned to the NLA, signing a two-year contract with HC Ambri-Piotta.

=== International play ===
Kariya has had several opportunities to represent Canada in international ice hockey competition. These include the 2005 Loto Cup, the 2005 Spengler Cup, the 2006 Deutschland Cup, the 2008 Spengler Cup and the 2010 Spengler Cup.

== Awards and honors ==
| Award | Year |
|---|---|
| All-Hockey East First Team | 2002–03 |

- 2002–03 HE Len Ceglarski Sportsmanship Award
- 2006–07 SM-Liiga Veli-Pekka Ketola trophy

== Career statistics ==
| | | | Regular season | | | | | Playoffs |
| Season | Team | League | GP | G | A | Pts | PIM | GP | G | A | Pts | PIM |
|---|---|---|---|---|---|---|---|---|---|---|---|---|
| 1997–98 | Victoria Salsa | BCHL | 55 | 7 | 9 | 16 | 6 | — | — | — | — | — |
| 1998–99 | Victoria Salsa | BCHL | 59 | 25 | 80 | 105 | 14 | 8 | 1 | 8 | 9 | 4 |
| 1999–2000 | University of Maine | HE | 35 | 8 | 17 | 25 | 6 | — | — | — | — | — |
| 2000–01 | University of Maine | HE | 39 | 12 | 24 | 36 | 10 | — | — | — | — | — |
| 2001–02 | University of Maine | HE | 43 | 16 | 28 | 44 | 14 | — | — | — | — | — |
| 2002–03 | University of Maine | HE | 39 | 14 | 36 | 50 | 6 | — | — | — | — | — |
| 2002–03 | Portland Pirates | AHL | — | — | — | — | — | 3 | 0 | 0 | 0 | 0 |
| 2003–04 | Bridgeport Sound Tigers | AHL | 70 | 8 | 17 | 25 | 16 | 7 | 0 | 1 | 1 | 2 |
| 2004–05 | Nikkō Ice Bucks | ALH | 15 | 6 | 12 | 18 | 20 | — | — | — | — | — |
| 2005–06 | Stjernen Fredrikstad | NOR | 39 | 15 | 37 | 52 | 49 | 11 | 3 | 10 | 13 | 8 |
| 2006–07 | Blues | SM-l | 51 | 18 | 43 | 61 | 58 | 9 | 0 | 5 | 5 | 4 |
| 2007–08 | Peoria Rivermen | AHL | 71 | 16 | 37 | 53 | 29 | — | — | — | — | — |
| 2008–09 | SCL Tigers | NLA | 50 | 15 | 43 | 58 | 22 | — | — | — | — | — |
| 2009–10 | Dinamo Riga | KHL | 38 | 4 | 18 | 22 | 16 | 9 | 3 | 2 | 5 | 2 |
| 2010–11 | HC Ambrì–Piotta | NLA | 38 | 5 | 21 | 26 | 8 | — | — | — | — | — |
| 2011–12 | HC Ambrì–Piotta | NLA | 14 | 5 | 7 | 12 | 2 | — | — | — | — | — |
| AHL totals | | | 141 | 24 | 54 | 78 | 45 | 10 | 0 | 1 | 1 | 2 |
| KHL totals | | | 38 | 4 | 18 | 22 | 16 | 9 | 3 | 2 | 5 | 2 |

== Personal ==
Martin is the younger brother of Steve, Noriko, and Paul Kariya. He is of Japanese and Scottish descent.

Awards and achievements
| Preceded by Jon DiSalvatore | Len Ceglarski Sportsmanship Award; 2002–03 | Succeeded by Steve Saviano |
| Preceded by Tony Salmelainen | Winner of the Veli-Pekka Ketola trophy 2006-07 | Succeeded by Janne Pesonen |
