= Tim Thomas (ice hockey, born 1974) =

American ice hockey player

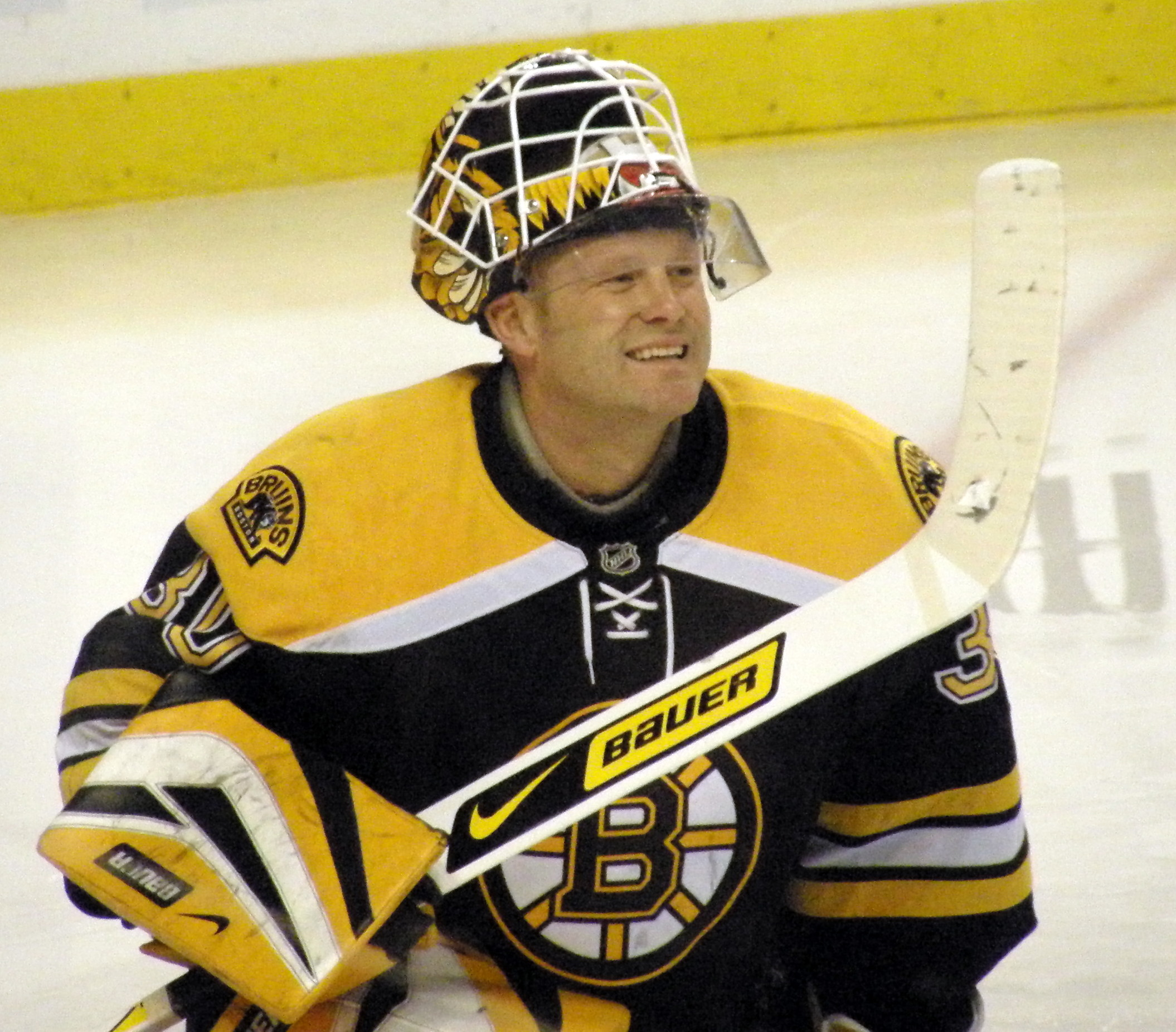
- Thomas with the Boston Bruins in 2008
- Born: April 15, 1974 (age 52) Flint, Michigan, U.S.
- Height: 5 ft 11 in (180 cm)
- Weight: 201 lb (91 kg; 14 st 5 lb)
- Position: Goaltender
- Caught: Left
- Played for: HIFK; AIK; Kärpät; Boston Bruins; Jokerit; Florida Panthers; Dallas Stars
- National team: United States
- NHL draft: 217th overall, 1994; Quebec Nordiques
- Playing career: 1997–2014
Medal record
Men's ice hockey
Representing United States
Olympic Games
Silver medal – second place	2010 Vancouver
World Championships
Bronze medal – third place	1996 Austria

Timothy James Thomas Jr. (born April 15, 1974) is an American former professional ice hockey goaltender who mainly played in the National Hockey League (NHL), most notably with the Boston Bruins.

He was born in Flint, Michigan and is a graduate of Davison High School. Thomas played college hockey for the University of Vermont for four years, from 1993–1997, during which he was drafted 217th overall by the Quebec Nordiques in the 1994 NHL entry draft. He played for several years in the minor leagues and Europe, before making it to the NHL at age 28, with the Boston Bruins. He finally emerged as the Bruins' starting goaltender at age 32.

Thomas is a two-time winner of the Vezina Trophy (2009 and 2011) as the NHL's best goaltender, and was a member of Team USA in the 2010 Winter Olympics in Vancouver. Thomas won the Conn Smythe Trophy as the most valuable player in the 2011 Stanley Cup playoffs; until Jordan Staal in 2026, Thomas was the oldest player in NHL history to win the award, at age 37. Thomas is one of four American-born players to win the Conn Smythe Trophy, along with Brian Leetch, Jonathan Quick, and Patrick Kane.

== Playing career ==
=== College hockey ===
Thomas played four seasons (1993–97) of college hockey for the University of Vermont, posting an 81–43–15 record to go with a 2.70 GAA and .934 save percentage. He ranks third in the NCAA Division I record book in career saves (3,950). He led the nation in save percentage in 1996 (.924) and helped UVM's Catamounts to NCAA tournament appearances in his final two seasons, including a berth in the 1996 NCAA Frozen Four (a program first). He was a two-time All-ECAC Conference selection and a two-time NCAA East All-American. He ranks first all-time amongst Vermont goalies in games played (140), wins (81) and saves (3,950). At Vermont, Thomas played on the same team as former NHL All-Star Martin St. Louis.

=== Early pro years ===
Completing his four-year tenure at Vermont, Thomas played briefly for the Birmingham Bulls of the East Coast Hockey League (ECHL) and Houston Aeros of the International Hockey League (IHL) in 1997–98, before transferring overseas mid-season to HIFK of the Finnish SM-Liiga. Thomas played 18 games with a save percentage of .947 as the team advanced through the playoffs to defeat Ilves in the finals and win the Finnish championship. After signing with the Edmonton Oilers on June 4, 1998, Thomas initially moved to the American Hockey League (AHL) the following season with the Hamilton Bulldogs, where he played 15 games, before again transferring to HIFK. Thomas recorded a .917 save percentage in 14 games as HIFK made it to the league finals once more but finished as runners-up to TPS.

In 1999–2000, Thomas returned once again to North America to play for the Detroit Vipers of the IHL, then spent the next season with AIK IF of the Swedish Elitserien. In 2001, he joined the Boston Bruins organization, but chose to continue playing in Europe, spending his first full SM-liiga season in 2001–02 with Kärpät. Although the team did not get far in the playoffs, Thomas played a successful season of 32 games with a .925 save percentage.

=== AHL seasons, NHL debut ===
Beginning in 2002–03, Thomas played his initial two seasons with Boston's AHL affiliate, the Providence Bruins. He made his National Hockey League (NHL) debut with the Bruins during the 2002–03 season, appearing in four games total, with a .907 save percentage and a 3–1 record. Thomas recorded his first NHL win in his league debut with the Bruins on October 19, 2002, in a 31-save, 4–3 win against the Edmonton Oilers.

=== Return to Finland ===
As a result of the one-season duration NHL lockout in North America, in 2004–05 Thomas joined Jokerit of the SM-Liiga, his fourth stint in Finland. He played in all games of the season except one, 54 games in total, and posted a league-high .946 save percentage. He also surpassed the previous record of 13 shutouts in the league by achieving 15 shutouts during the regular season. Thomas continued to perform in the playoffs, where he played 12 games with a .938 save percentage. However, the team was unable to defeat Kärpät in the finals, and Thomas was awarded his second silver medal in the SM-liiga. He received the Lasse Oksanen trophy (as the league's best player) and the Kultainen kypärä award (as the league's best player award as voted by the players), becoming the first Jokerit player to win the award since Teemu Selänne.

=== Boston Bruins ===
In August 2005, Thomas signed to play with Jokerit for the 2005–06 season, but his contract included an NHL option and on September 14, one day before the regular season in the SM-liiga started, Thomas announced he had signed with the Boston Bruins, leaving Jokerit with rookie goaltender Joonas Hallikainen as their sole goaltender. Eventually, Jokerit used three North American goaltenders (Karl Goehring, Steve Passmore and Tom Askey) that season, but missed the playoffs.

When he returned to North America, Thomas was assigned to the Providence Bruins of the AHL out of training camp. However, as Boston suffered injuries to their two goaltenders Andrew Raycroft and Hannu Toivonen, Thomas earned his first call-up to the NHL in three years and took over as the Bruins starter, completing the 2005–06 season with a 12–13–7 record, 2.77 goals against average (GAA), .917 save percentage and his first NHL shutout. As a result, Thomas was awarded the Boston Bruins 7th Player Award, voted by the fans as having gone beyond expectations. In the off-season, Thomas was re-signed by the Bruins to a three-year contract.

Although Boston's previous starter, Andrew Raycroft, was traded to the Toronto Maple Leafs in the 2006 off-season, Thomas began the 2006–07 season as the Bruins' backup, behind Hannu Toivonen instead. However, as Toivonen struggled, Thomas was again promoted as the Bruins' starting goaltender, eventually posting a 30–29–4 record with a .904 save percentage. He won the 7th Player Award for the second consecutive season and became the first goaltender in team history to win the award twice.

During the 2007 off-season, Thomas began a yoga-based physical conditioning program to increase his flexibility and strength, and one that would greatly increase his abilities during the 2007–08 season and onwards. On July 1, 2007, the Bruins acquired goaltender Manny Fernandez from the Minnesota Wild and later traded Thomas' previous backup, Toivonen, to the St. Louis Blues. Many hockey analysts presumed Thomas would support Fernandez as a backup goaltender once again for the 2007–08 season. However, as Fernandez went down to injury early in the season, Thomas seized the opportunity and once again emerged as the Bruins' starter. He was selected for his first NHL All-Star Game on January 22, 2008, as a replacement for Martin Brodeur and played in the third period of the game, stopping 14 of 18 shots. Thomas was credited with the win, as the Eastern Conference defeated the Western Conference 8–7.

Early in the 2008–09 season, Thomas became the first Bruins goaltender to record back-to-back shutouts since Byron Dafoe in 1999, winning 1–0 games against the Edmonton Oilers on October 27, 2008, and the Vancouver Canucks on October 28. His overall shutout streak came to end the next game at 154:43 minutes against the Calgary Flames on October 30. In late November, Thomas missed a few games due to an illness. He was chosen to play in his second All-Star Game in 2009 and was once again the winning goaltender for the Eastern Conference, defeating the Western Conference 12–11 in a shootout (the first time the All-Star Game required the tie-breaker since 2003). One month later, on February 26, 2009, Thomas recorded his 100th NHL win in a 6–0 shutout against the Anaheim Ducks. On April 2, Thomas agreed to a four-year contract extension with the Bruins, through the 2012–13 season. The contract saw him make $6 million the first two seasons, then $5 million and $3 million the final two seasons for an average annual salary of $5 million. Two days later, on April 4, he posted his career-high fifth shutout of the season in a 1–0 win against the New York Rangers, clinching the top spot in the Eastern Conference, Boston's first title since 2001–02. His strong play allowed the Bruins to sweep the Montreal Canadiens in the first round of the 2009 playoffs, however the Bruins were defeated by the Carolina Hurricanes in seven games in the second round. On June 18, Thomas was awarded the Vezina Trophy, edging Minnesota Wild netminder Niklas Bäckström and the Columbus Blue Jackets' rookie goaltender Steve Mason. He led the NHL with his 2.10 GAA and .933 save percentage.

Thomas started for the Bruins in the 3rd NHL Winter Classic on January 1, 2010. The game, held at Fenway Park in Boston, resulted in a 2–1 overtime victory over the visiting Philadelphia Flyers. But Thomas suffered a drop-off in form during the regular season, posting just a 17–18–8 record, albeit with a still-strong 2.56 GAA. He did not play at all in the 2010 playoffs, as Tuukka Rask played all the games for Boston. The Bruins won their First Round series against the third seeded Buffalo Sabres in six games and led the seventh seeded Philadelphia Flyers three games to none in the Conference semi-final. Boston then lost the next four games to drop the series; the Flyers became just the third out of four teams in NHL history (after the 1942 Toronto Maple Leafs and the 1975 New York Islanders, and before the 2014 Los Angeles Kings) to win a series after losing the first three games.

Named to his third straight NHL All-Star Game in 2011 – the game was not played in 2010 due to the Winter Olympics – Thomas became the first goaltender in NHL history to earn the win in three consecutive All-Star Games. In the 2010–11 season, following off-season hip surgery during the summer of 2010, Thomas broke the NHL record for save percentage, beating Dominik Hašek's record of .937 with a .938 percentage. Thomas would go on to win his second Vezina Trophy that year. He also finished fifth overall in the Hart Memorial Trophy voting as the regular season MVP. On May 27, 2011, Thomas posted a 1–0 shutout victory over the Tampa Bay Lightning in game seven of the Eastern Conference Final, sending the Bruins to their first Stanley Cup appearance since 1990. In the Finals, Thomas again posted a 4–0 shutout victory in game seven against the Presidents' Trophy-winning Vancouver Canucks to win the series 4–3 and the Bruins' first Stanley Cup title since 1972. During the Bruins' playoff run, he set the record for most saves in a single post-season with 798 and the most saves in a Stanley Cup series with 238, and broke Frank McCool's 66-year-old record of fewest goals allowed in a seven-game Stanley Cup Final, allowing only eight goals total the whole series (for an all-time record .967 save percentage in the Stanley Cup Finals). Thomas also became the first goaltender ever to post a shutout in a game seven on the road. He won the Conn Smythe Trophy as playoff MVP, and at 37 years, 62 days, Thomas is the oldest goaltender and second-oldest player to win the award. He became just the second American-born NHL player (after Brian Leetch in 1994) and first American-born goaltender to win the award.

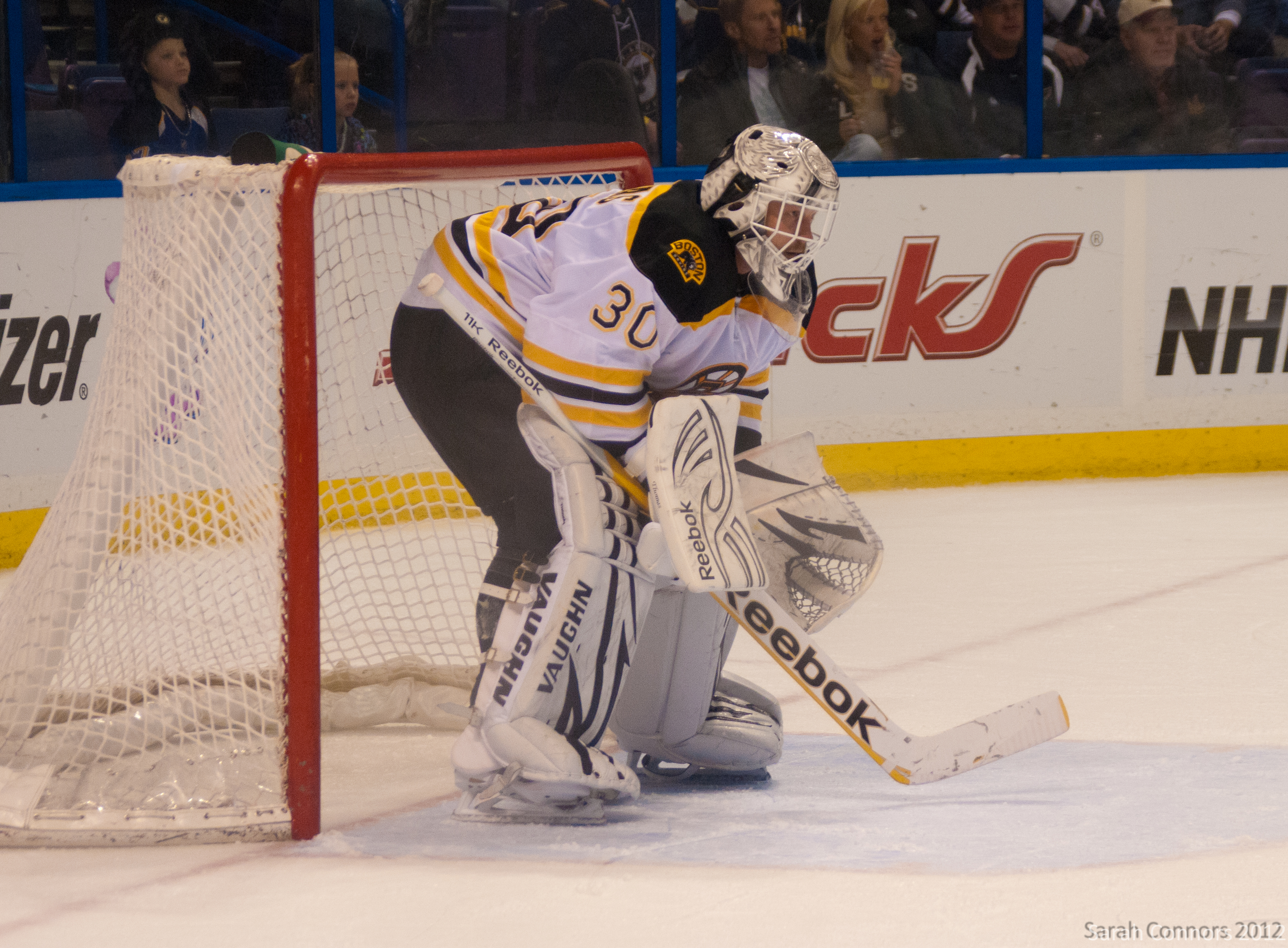
Thomas with the Bruins in February 2012

Thomas began the 2011–12 season as a Stanley Cup champion and the defending Vezina and Conn Smythe trophy winner. He played the majority of the 82-game schedule for the Bruins, beating Tuukka Rask for the number one spot for the second consecutive year. Although not completely matching the previous year's record-breaking run, Thomas received the most votes in the 2012 All Star Game Ballot, entering the 2012 NHL All-Star Game as the starting goaltender, and put up another solid year with the Bruins, helping them dominate the NHL with their goal differential for the majority of the year. The defending Stanley Cup champion and second-seeded Bruins ended up losing in seven games to the seventh-seeded Washington Capitals in the 2012 playoffs in the first round. Every game of the series was won by only one goal. Shortly after the Bruins' season ended, Thomas announced that he would sit out the 2012–13 season. Bruins' general manager Peter Chiarelli confirmed Thomas' decision.

Thomas was traded to the New York Islanders on February 7, 2013, in exchange for a conditional second-round draft pick in either 2014 or 2015. Before the trade, the Bruins had suspended Thomas for not reporting to training camp. Thomas did not play any games with the Islanders organization before his contract expired.

Thomas' 196 regular-season wins with Boston ranks him fifth on the team's all-time list as of 2023.

=== Florida Panthers and Dallas Stars ===
After taking a year off from the NHL, Thomas joined the Florida Panthers on a tryout contract on September 16, 2013. He officially signed a one-year contract with the Panthers on September 26. Thomas has mentioned he chose 34 as his jersey number with the Panthers in honor of John Vanbiesbrouck, a goaltender from Michigan whom he grew up watching.

Thomas was acquired by the Dallas Stars on March 5, 2014, in exchange for goaltender Dan Ellis. He went back to number 30 in Dallas and served as backup to Kari Lehtonen.

== International play ==
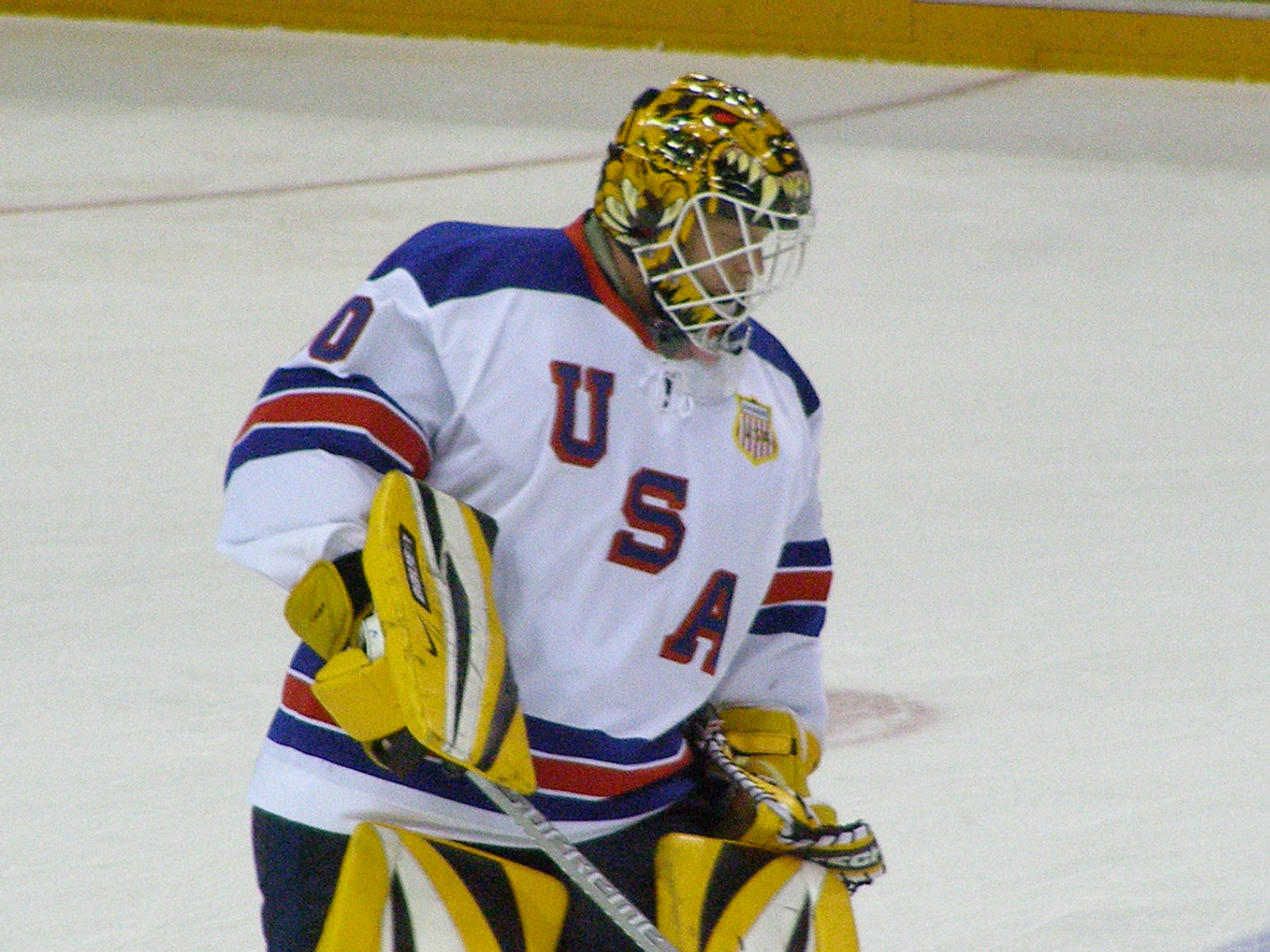
Thomas during the 2008 IIHF World Championship

During Thomas' college career with the University of Vermont, he was twice named to the United States squad for the World Championships. Following his sophomore year, he was chosen for the 1995 World Championships, but did not appear in any games as the United States finished in sixth place. He was chosen for the tournament for the second consecutive year in 1996 and made his international debut, playing in 21 minutes for one game, allowing one goal. Thomas picked up his first medal as the United States won bronze.

After graduating from the college program, Thomas was named to Team USA for the 1998 World Championships following his rookie professional season and played his first full international game. However, the United States finished a disappointing 12th. Thomas would not make another World Championships appearance until 2005, where he was named to Team USA in another limited role, not appearing in any games behind starter Rick DiPietro as they failed to earn a medal.

Established as an NHL starter following the 2007–08 season, Thomas was named to his fifth World Championships in 2008. He appeared in three games before suffering a groin injury, splitting starts with Robert Esche and posting a 1.50 GAA with one shutout against Latvia in the preliminaries. The United States finished in sixth place.

On January 1, 2010, Thomas was selected to be a member of the United States men's hockey team for the 2010 Vancouver Olympics, serving as backup goaltender to the Buffalo Sabres' Ryan Miller.

On February 26, 2010, Thomas made his Olympic debut in the United States–Finland semi-final, entering the game with approximately 11:30 remaining in the third period and a 6–0 lead. He replaced Ryan Miller to prevent any chance of injury to the American starter.

Thomas wrapped up his hockey career at the 2014 IIHF World Championship. The USA was eliminated in the quarterfinals and Thomas finished with a 3.49 GAA and .869 save percentage on 199 shots.

== Personal life ==
Thomas and wife Melissa have three children: two daughters and a son. After retiring from hockey, Thomas resided in Sandpoint, Idaho, and also Milton, Vermont. He has become involved in numerous charitable events in the New England area, and established the Tim Thomas foundation which focused on helping those facing obstacles such as illness, lack of education, along providing disaster recovery in Vermont. In 2023, he participated in a flood relief effort in Barre, Vermont, helping clean up and rebuild a heavily damaged YouthBuild center an organization offering job training and educational opportunities to youth aged 16–24.

On December 11, 2019, Thomas was honored by the Boston Bruins and dropped the ceremonial first puck during their game vs the Capitals. In December 2024, Thomas made a rare return to the hockey community, when he coached the Boston Bruins Alumni team in a benefit game alongside his former teammate Brad Marchand. While Thomas lives a mostly quiet lifestyle he has continued to make appearances with the Bruins alumni events and games.

Thomas is a Christian and a libertarian, and has stated that the person he would most like to have dinner with is conservative TV pundit Glenn Beck. After winning the Stanley Cup in 2011, Thomas skipped the traditional victors' meet-and-greet with President Barack Obama at the White House on January 23, 2012; he was the only active Bruin not to attend. He released a statement regarding his absence:

I believe the Federal government has grown out of control, threatening the Rights, Liberties, and Property of the People.

This is being done at the Executive, Legislative, and Judicial level. This is in direct opposition to the Constitution and the Founding Fathers vision for the Federal government.

Because I believe this, today I exercised my right as a Free Citizen, and did not visit the White House. This was not about politics or party, as in my opinion both parties are responsible for the situation we are in as a country. This was about a choice I had to make as an INDIVIDUAL.

This is the only public statement I will be making on this topic. TT

=== Disclosure of brain damage from concussions ===
In the first few years of retirement, Thomas fell out of the public eye. Reporters' inquiries went unanswered, teammates lost contact, and phone numbers that Thomas used were disconnected. This led to speculation and jokes that he had gone off-grid and isolated himself in a bunker. In December 2019, at the ceremony for his induction into the United States Hockey Hall of Fame, Thomas revealed that he had suffered a concussion in December 2013 by getting hit in the head by a puck from the shot of a teammate during the warmup before a game with the Florida Panthers. The day after that game, Thomas found it extremely difficult to make decisions and communicate with others. He also started to experience suicidal thoughts. Thomas eventually received a brain scan which showed that two-thirds of his brain was getting less than five percent of typical blood flow while the other third of his brain was around fifty percent below typical blood flow. With treatment and rehabilitation, Thomas has seen modest improvements in his lifestyle and has been slowly reconnecting with hockey and his community.

== Awards and honors ==
Award	Year
College
All-ECAC Hockey Rookie Team	1993–94
All-ECAC Hockey First Team	1994–95, 1995–96
AHCA East second-team All-American	1994–95
AHCA East first-team All-American	1995–96

Source: Tim Thomas on HockeyGoalies.org

SM-liiga

- Awarded the Urpo Ylönen trophy (best goaltender) in 1998
- Kanada-malja champion (1998)
- Awarded the Kultainen kypärä award (best player as voted by the players) in 2005
- Awarded the Lasse Oksanen trophy (best player) in 2005 – first non-European to win the award

NHL

- 4× NHL All-Star Game (2008, 2009, 2011, and 2012)
- William M. Jennings Trophy winner along with teammate Manny Fernandez for fewest goals allowed by team goaltenders (2009)
- 2× Vezina Trophy Winner (2009, 2011)
- 2× NHL first All-Star team (2009, 2011)
- Conn Smythe Trophy winner (2011)
- Stanley Cup champion (2011)
- First goaltender to win the Stanley Cup, Vezina, and Conn Smythe trophies in the same season since Bernie Parent in the 1974–75 season.

Boston Bruins

- 6x Bruins 3 Stars Awards Winner (2005-06, 2006-07, 2007-08, 2008-09, 2010-11 and 2011-12)
- 2x Seventh Player Award Winner (2005–06 and 2006–07)
- Eddie Shore Award Winner (2006–07)
- Elizabeth C. Dufresne Trophy Winner (2010-11)
- Named one of the top 100 best Boston Bruins players of all time.

Other

- 2007 UVM Athletics Hall of Fame inductee.
- 2011 ESPY award winner – Best NHL Player
- 2011 ESPY award winner – Best Championship Performance
- 2019 U.S. Hockey Hall of Fame Inductee
- 2022 Vermont Sports Hall of Fame inductee.
- 2025 Hockey Legacy Award from The Sports Museum at TD Garden.

== Records ==
- Most saves by a goaltender in a playoff run (798)
- Most saves by a goaltender in a Stanley Cup Final series (238)
- Best SM-liiga save percentage with at least a hundred games played (0.937)

== Hockey camps ==
Thomas runs several ice hockey camps in the Northeast United States during the NHL off-season for both goaltenders and skaters.

== Career statistics ==
=== Regular season and playoffs ===
Bold indicates led league
Bold italics indicate NHL record

			Regular season										Playoffs
Season	Team	League	GP	W	L	T	OTL	MIN	GA	SO	GAA	SV%	GP	W	L	MIN	GA	SO	GAA	SV%
1992–93	Davison High School	HS-MI	27	18	5	4	—	1580	87	9	3.30	.926	—	—	—	—	—	—	—	—
1993–94	University of Vermont	ECAC	33	15	12	6	—	1864	94	0	3.03	.899	—	—	—	—	—	—	—	—
1994–95	University of Vermont	ECAC	34	18	13	2	—	2010	90	4	2.69	.914	—	—	—	—	—	—	—	—
1995–96	University of Vermont	ECAC	37	26	7	4	—	2254	88	3	2.34	.924	—	—	—	—	—	—	—	—
1996–97	University of Vermont	ECAC	36	22	11	3	—	2158	101	2	2.81	.914	—	—	—	—	—	—	—	—
1997–98	Houston Aeros	IHL	1	0	0	1	—	59	4	0	4.01	.852	—	—	—	—	—	—	—	—
1997–98	Birmingham Bulls	ECHL	6	4	1	1	—	360	13	1	2.17	.944	—	—	—	—	—	—	—	—
1997–98	HIFK	SM-l	18	13	4	1	—	1034	28	2	1.62	.947	9	9	0	551	14	3	1.52	.926
1998–99	Hamilton Bulldogs	AHL	15	6	8	0	—	837	45	0	3.23	.905	—	—	—	—	—	—	—	—
1998–99	HIFK	SM-l	14	8	3	3	—	831	34	2	2.23	.917	11	7	4	658	25	0	2.28	.920
1999–2000	Detroit Vipers	IHL	36	10	21	3	—	2020	120	1	3.56	.892	—	—	—	—	—	—	—	—
2000–01	AIK	SEL	43	17	16	10	—	2542	105	3	2.48	.918	5	1	4	299	20	0	4.00	.875
2001–02	Kärpät	SM-l	32	15	12	5	—	1937	79	4	2.45	.925	3	1	2	180	12	0	4.00	.903
2002–03	Providence Bruins	AHL	35	18	12	5	—	2049	98	1	2.87	.906	—	—	—	—	—	—	—	—
2002–03	Boston Bruins	NHL	4	3	1	0	—	220	11	0	3.00	.907	—	—	—	—	—	—	—	—
2003–04	Providence Bruins	AHL	43	20	16	6	—	2544	78	9	1.84	.941	2	0	2	84	10	0	7.13	.655
2004–05	Jokerit	SM-l	54	34	7	13	—	3267	86	15	1.58	.946	12	8	4	720	22	0	1.83	.938
2005–06	Providence Bruins	AHL	26	15	11	—	0	1515	57	1	2.26	.923	—	—	—	—	—	—	—	—
2005–06	Boston Bruins	NHL	38	12	13	—	10	2187	101	1	2.77	.917	—	—	—	—	—	—	—	—
2006–07	Boston Bruins	NHL	66	30	29	—	4	3619	189	3	3.13	.905	—	—	—	—	—	—	—	—
2007–08	Boston Bruins	NHL	57	28	19	—	6	3342	136	3	2.44	.921	7	3	4	430	19	0	2.65	.914
2008–09	Boston Bruins	NHL	54	36	11	—	7	3259	114	5	**2.10**	**.933**	11	7	4	680	21	1	1.85	.935
2009–10	Boston Bruins	NHL	43	17	18	—	8	2442	104	5	2.56	.915	—	—	—	—	—	—	—	—
2010–11	Boston Bruins	NHL	57	35	11	—	9	3364	112	9	**2.00**	**.938**	**25**	**16**	9	**1542**	51	**4**	1.98	**.940**
2011–12	Boston Bruins	NHL	59	35	19	—	1	3352	132	5	2.36	.920	7	3	4	448	16	1	2.14	.923
2013–14	Florida Panthers	NHL	40	16	20	—	3	2299	110	0	2.87	.909	—	—	—	—	—	—	—	—
2013–14	Dallas Stars	NHL	8	2	4	—	1	364	18	0	2.97	.902	1	0	0	15	1	0	4.00	.500
SM-l totals			118	70	26	22	—	7,069	227	23	1.93	.937	35	25	10	2,109	73	3	2.08	—
NHL totals			426	214	145	0	49	24,446	1,027	31	2.52	.920	51	29	21	3,114	108	6	2.08	.933

=== International ===
Year	Team	Event	GP	W	L	T	MIN	GA	SO	GAA	SV%
1995	United States	WC	—	—	—	—	—	—	—	—	—
1996	United States	WC	1	0	0	0	21	1	0	2.86	.970
1998	United States	WC	1	0	0	0	58	2	0	2.06	.917
1999	United States	WC	2	0	2	0	98	7	0	4.29	.910
2005	United States	WC	—	—	—	—	—	—	—	—	—
2008	United States	WC	3	2	0	—	160	4	1	1.50	.925
2010	United States	OG	1	0	0	—	12	1	0	5.21	.857
2014	United States	WC	8	5	3	—	447	26	0	3.49	.869
Senior totals			16	7	5	0	796	41	1	3.09	—

Awards
Preceded by Award created	Ken Dryden Award; 1995–96	Succeeded by Trevor Koenig
Preceded by Timo Pärssinen	Winner of the Kultainen kypärä trophy 2004–05	Succeeded by Tony Salmelainen
Preceded by Timo Pärssinen	Winner of the Lasse Oksanen trophy 2004–05	Succeeded by Tony Salmelainen
Preceded by Jani Hurme	Winner of the Urpo Ylönen trophy 1997–98	Succeeded by Miikka Kiprusoff
Preceded by Chris Osgood and Dominik Hasek	Winner of the William M. Jennings Trophy with Manny Fernandez; 2008–09	Succeeded by Martin Brodeur
Preceded by Martin Brodeur; Ryan Miller	Winner of the Vezina Trophy; 2008–09; 2010–11	Succeeded by Ryan Miller; Henrik Lundqvist
Preceded by Jonathan Toews	Winner of the Conn Smythe Trophy; 2011	Succeeded by Jonathan Quick
