= Len Ceglarski Award =

Annual ice hockey award

- Sport: Ice hockey
- Awarded for: To one player who has consistently demonstrated superior conduct and sportsmanship on the ice.

History
- First award: 1992
- Most recent: Hudson Schandor

The Len Ceglarski Award is an annual award given out at the conclusion of the Hockey East regular season to the player most exemplifying the qualities of sportsmanship on the ice in the conference as voted by the head coaches of each Hockey East team. The award was created and named in honor of long-time Boston College head coach Len Ceglarski who retired following the 1991–92 season. The Len Ceglarski Award was first bestowed in 1992 and every year thereafter.

No goaltender has ever won the award in league history. Only Steve Kariya, Joe Gambardella, Jacob Bryson, and Hudson Schandor have received the award more than once, Gambardella and Bryson winning in two consecutive years, and Kariya doing so in three consecutive years from 1996–97 to 1998–99.

== Award winners ==
Year	Winner	Position	School
1991–92	Joe Flanagan	Center	New Hampshire
1992–93	Shane Henry	Center	Massachusetts Lowell
1993–94	Michael Spalla	Defenceman	Boston College
1994–95	Steve Thornton	Center	Boston University
1995–96	Todd Hall	Defenceman	New Hampshire
1996–97	Steve Kariya	Left Wing	Maine
1997–98	Steve Kariya	Left Wing	Maine
1998–99	Steve Kariya	Left Wing	Maine
1999–00	Cory Larose	Center	Maine
2000–01	Mike Jozefowicz	Defenceman	Northeastern
2001–02	Jon DiSalvatore	Defenceman	Providence
2002–03	Martin Kariya	Left Wing	Maine
2003–04	Steve Saviano	Left Wing	New Hampshire
2004–05	Jason Guerriero	Center	Northeastern
2005–06	Danny O'Brien	Right Wing	Massachusetts Lowell
2006–07	Mike Lundin	Defenceman	Maine
2007–08	Chris Higgins	Center	Boston University

Year	Winner	Position	School
2008–09	Dean Strong	Right Wing	Vermont
2009–10	Ben Smith	Right Wing	Boston College
2010–11	Brian Flynn	Right Wing	Maine
2011–12	Chris Connolly	Left Wing	Boston University
2012–13	Chris McCarthy	Left Wing	Vermont
2013–14	Ross Mauermann	Left Wing	Providence
2014–15	Michael Sit	Center	Boston College
2015–16	Joe Gambardella	Center	Massachusetts Lowell
2016–17	Joe Gambardella	Center	Massachusetts Lowell
2017–18	Jacob Bryson	Defenceman	Providence
2018–19	Jacob Bryson	Defenceman	Providence
2019–20	Benjamin Freeman	Forward	Connecticut
2020–21	Patrick Grasso	Forward	New Hampshire
2021–22	Jackson Pierson	Forward	New Hampshire
2022–23	Hudson Schandor	Forward	Connecticut
2023–24	Ryan Ufko	Defenseman	Massachusetts
2023–24	Eamon Powell	Defenseman	Boston College
2024–25	Hudson Schandor	Forward	Connecticut

=== Winners by school ===
School	Winners
Maine	7
New Hampshire	5
Providence	4
Massachusetts Lowell	4
Boston College	4
Boston University	3
Connecticut	3
Northeastern	2
Vermont	2
Massachusetts	1

=== Winners by position ===
Position	Winners
Center	9
Right Wing	4
Left Wing	8
Forward	5
Defenceman	8
Goaltender	0

== See also ==
- Hockey East Awards
