= Janne Pesonen =

Finnish ice hockey player (born 1982)

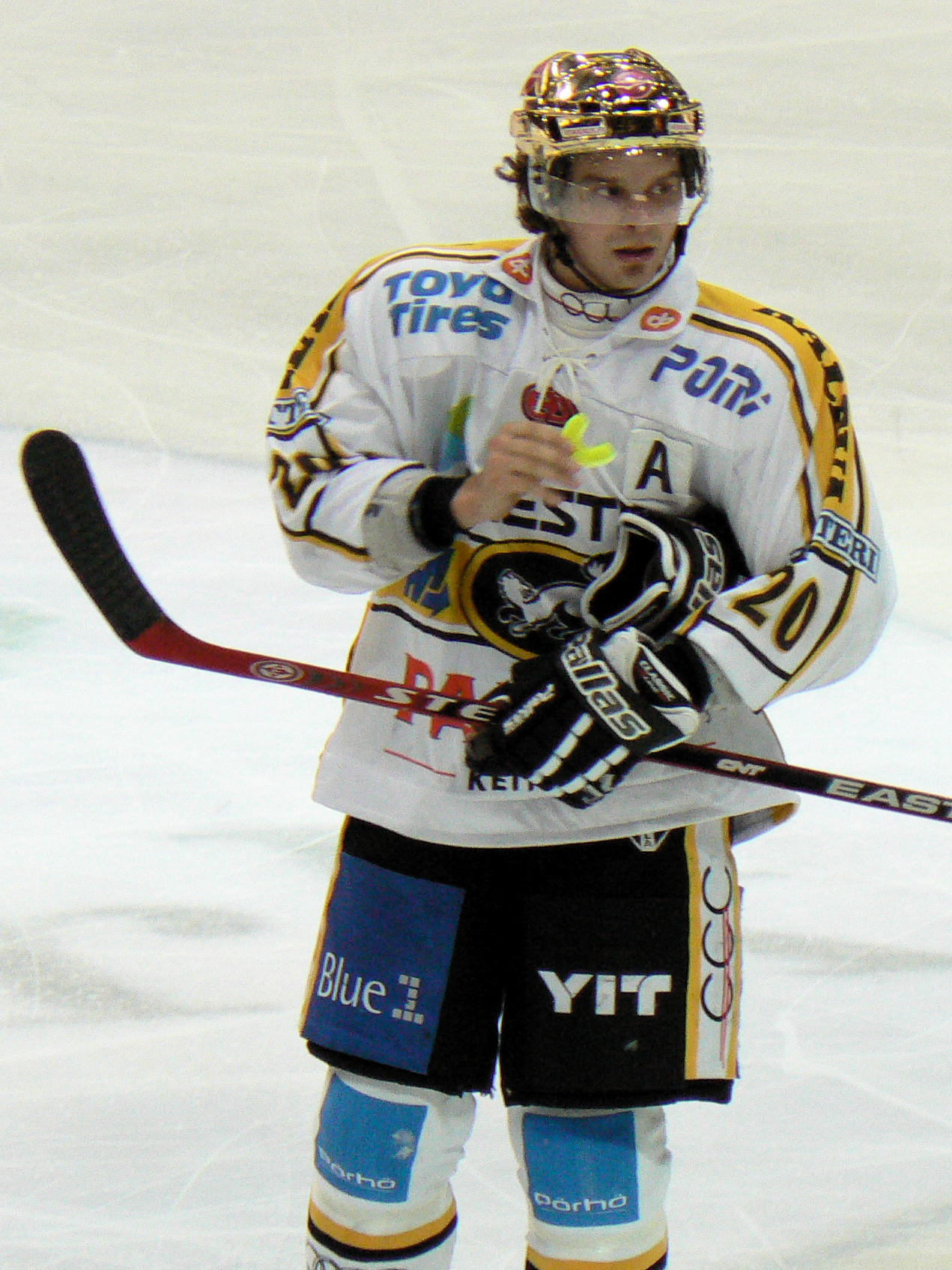
- Janne Pesonen in white away jersey of Kärpät
- Born: 11 May 1982 (age 44) Suomussalmi, Finland
- Height: 5 ft 11 in (180 cm)
- Weight: 183 lb (83 kg; 13 st 1 lb)
- Position: Left wing
- Shot: Left
- Played for: Oulun Kärpät; Pittsburgh Penguins; Ak Bars Kazan; HIFK; Skellefteå AIK; HC Ambrì-Piotta; Växjö Lakers
- National team: Finland
- NHL draft: 269th overall, 2004; Mighty Ducks of Anaheim
- Playing career: 2001–2019

Janne Tapani Pesonen (born 11 May 1982) is a Finnish former professional ice hockey winger who played for Oulun Kärpät of the Finnish Liiga.

== Playing career ==
Pesonen began his career with Hokki in 1998, playing in the second-highest division of hockey in Finland, the Mestis.

=== Kärpät ===
He then played for Kärpät in the Finnish top division, the SM-liiga, from 2001 to 2002 and 2003–08. After his first season with Kärpät he returned to Hokki for one season in 2002–03. He returned to Kärpät in 2003–04 and won the SM-liiga Rookie of the Year award, helping Kärpät to their first Finnish championship since 1981. His five seasons with Kärpät from 2003 to 2008 saw Pesonen win four Finnish championships in total, in 2004, 2005, 2007, and 2008. He won the Jari Kurri trophy, which is annually awarded the playoff MVP, in 2007. He had his best season in 2007–08 when he led the SM-liiga in goals, points, and plus-minus, winning the Aarne Honkavaara, Veli-Pekka Ketola, and Matti Keinonen trophies, respectively, for his efforts. That season he tallied 34 goals and 44 assists for a total 78 points in only 56 games played.

=== Pittsburgh Penguins ===
On 7 July 2008, the Pittsburgh Penguins announced that they signed Pesonen to a one-year contract. After 3 preseason games in which he tallied 1 goal and 1 assist, Pesonen was sent to the Penguins' AHL affiliate, the Wilkes-Barre/Scranton Penguins, on 8 October 2008. Pesonen would show his ability to adapt to the North American style of hockey by scoring 9 pts in his first seven games, scoring two goals and garnering seven assists. On 31 October, Pesonen was recalled by the Pittsburgh Penguins, where he made his NHL debut on 1 November against the St. Louis Blues. Pesonen's stay with the Penguins was brief, and he was returned to the AHL after seven games. On 16 March, Pesonen set a new record for points in a single season for the Wilkes-Barre/Scranton Baby Penguins, passing up Toby Petersen's 67-point season of 2000–01. At season's end, Pesonen finished with 82 points, fourth in the AHL in scoring and the highest point total by a Finn in AHL history.

=== Ak Bars Kazan ===
After one season in North America, Pesonen opted to return to Europe and signed with Russian club Ak Bars Kazan of the Kontinental Hockey League on 4 August 2009. He left Kazan after two seasons for a try-out contract with the Winnipeg Jets of the National Hockey League (NHL) on 11 August 2011. He was released from the Jets on 2 October, after failing to get an extended offer.

After a year in Finland playing for HIFK, Pesonen announced he had signed a one-year contract with Ak Bars Kazan.

=== HC Ambri-Piotta ===
On August 24, 2016, Pesonen signed a seven-week contract with HC Ambrì-Piotta of the National League A (NLA) as an injury replacement for Adam Hall.

== Post-playing career ==
After retiring from professional play, Pesonen has worked as an expert and a consultant. In May 2024, he became the sporting director for HIFK.

== Career statistics ==
=== Regular season and playoffs ===
			Regular season					Playoffs
Season	Team	League	GP	G	A	Pts	PIM	GP	G	A	Pts	PIM
1998–99	Hokki	FIN.4	2	0	0	0	0	—	—	—	—	—
1999–2000	Kärpät	FIN U18	33	6	12	18	30	3	0	1	1	0
2000–01	Kärpät	FIN U20	41	9	22	31	18	6	1	1	2	0
2001–02	Kärpät	FIN U20	42	12	19	31	18	3	2	0	2	2
2001–02	Kärpät	SM-l	9	2	0	2	0	1	0	0	0	0
2002–03	Hokki	Mestis	40	15	21	36	62	3	2	0	2	4
2003–04	Kärpät	SM-l	56	17	13	30	28	15	1	1	2	4
2004–05	Kärpät	SM-l	55	11	18	29	42	12	2	0	2	0
2005–06	Kärpät	SM-l	53	8	14	22	34	11	4	0	4	8
2006–07	Kärpät	SM-l	56	22	33	55	38	9	4	3	7	10
2007–08	Kärpät	SM-l	56	34	44	78	58	14	7	9	16	10
2008–09	Pittsburgh Penguins	NHL	7	0	0	0	0	—	—	—	—	—
2008–09	Wilkes–Barre/Scranton Penguins	AHL	70	32	50	82	33	5	1	5	6	0
2009–10	Ak Bars Kazan	KHL	42	14	11	25	12	8	1	0	1	4
2010–11	Ak Bars Kazan	KHL	46	14	13	27	28	8	3	1	4	4
2011–12	HIFK	SM-l	38	13	15	28	18	4	0	1	1	0
2012–13	Ak Bars Kazan	KHL	45	17	10	27	42	18	4	8	12	28
2013–14	Ak Bars Kazan	KHL	48	16	6	22	18	6	1	2	3	6
2014–15	Ak Bars Kazan	KHL	22	7	3	10	8	—	—	—	—	—
2014–15	Skellefteå AIK	SHL	20	16	10	26	14	15	4	6	10	2
2015–16	Skellefteå AIK	SHL	21	11	11	22	2	16	3	5	8	0
2016–17	HC Ambrì–Piotta	NLA	49	13	21	34	18	—	—	—	—	—
2017–18	Växjö Lakers	SHL	30	8	14	22	4	12	3	5	8	2
2018–19	Växjö Lakers	SHL	42	17	13	30	18	6	0	1	1	0
2019–20	Kärpät	Liiga	27	6	9	15	14	—	—	—	—	—
SM-l/Liiga totals			350	113	146	259	232	66	18	14	32	32
NHL totals			7	0	0	0	0	—	—	—	—	—
KHL totals			203	68	43	111	108	40	9	11	20	42

Medal record

Ice hockey

Representing Finland

World Championships
Gold medal – first place	2011 Slovakia	

=== International ===
Year	Team	Event	Result	GP	G	A	Pts	PIM
2011	Finland	WC	1st place, gold medalist(s)	9	2	5	7	4
2012	Finland	WC	4th	9	1	2	3	2
2013	Finland	WC	4th	9	2	6	8	27
2015	Finland	WC	6th	8	1	4	5	2
2018	Finland	WC	5th	8	2	2	4	0
Senior totals				43	8	19	27	35

== Awards ==
- American Hockey League
  - Second All-Star Team – 2008–09
- Kontinental Hockey League
  - Gagarin Cup Champion – 2009–10
- SM-liiga
  - All-Star Team – 2006–07, 2007–08
  - Best Player in Playoffs (Jari Kurri Award) – 2006–07
  - Best Plus–Minus (Matti Keinonen Trophy) – 2007–08
  - Bronze Medal – 2005–06
  - Champion – 2003–04, 2004–05, 2006–07, 2007–08
  - Most Assists by Rookie – 2003–04
  - Most Game-Winning Goals – 2007–08
  - Most Goals (Aarne Honkavaara Trophy) – 2007–08
  - Most Goals by Rookie – 2003–04
  - Most Points (Veli-Pekka Ketola Trophy) – 2007–08
  - Most Points by Rookie – 2003–04
  - Most Power Play Goals – 2007–08
  - Most Shorthanded Goals – 2007–08
  - Player of the Month – 2007–08
  - Rookie of the Year – 2003–04
- World Championship
  - Gold Medal – 2011
- Swedish Hockey League
  - Le Mat Trophy – 2017–18

Preceded by Miika Wiikman	Winner of the Jari Kurri trophy 2006–07	Succeeded by Tuomas Tarkki
