= Steve Kariya =

Canadian ice hockey player (born 1977)

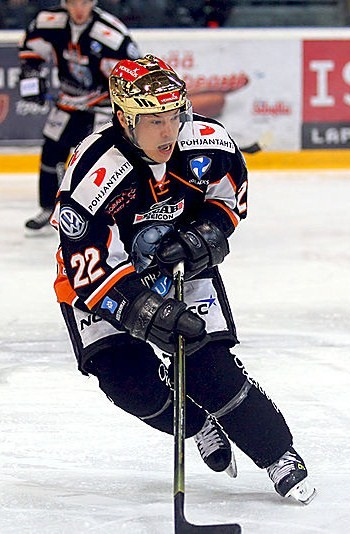
- Kariya with HPK in 2008
- Born: December 22, 1977 (age 48) North Vancouver, British Columbia, Canada
- Height: 5 ft 6 in (168 cm)
- Weight: 170 lb (77 kg; 12 st 2 lb)
- Position: Right wing
- Shot: Right
- Played for: NHL; Vancouver Canucks; SML; Ilves Tampere; Espoo Blues; HPK Hämeenlinna; JYP Jyväskylä; SEL; Frölunda Indians
- National team: Canada
- NHL draft: Undrafted
- Playing career: 1999–2010

Steven Tetsuo Kariya (born December 22, 1977) is a Canadian former professional ice hockey winger and younger brother of former National Hockey League (NHL) player Paul Kariya. Kariya was born in North Vancouver, British Columbia.

== Playing career ==
After playing Junior A with the Nanaimo Clippers, he joined the college hockey ranks with the University of Maine Black Bears. In his senior year, he captained the Black Bears and led them to an NCAA title in 1999.

Having not been drafted by an NHL team, he was signed as a free agent by the Vancouver Canucks and played three-and-a-half years within the organization. During the 2004–05 NHL lockout, Kariya went overseas to play for Ilves Tampere of the Finnish SM-liiga and won the Veli-Pekka Ketola trophy as the league's top point-scorer. Remaining in Finland, he played one-season stints with the Espoo Blues, HPK, and JYP, with whom he last played during the 2009–10 season. He also played for Frölunda HC of the Swedish Elitserien for two seasons.

On March 1, 2013, Kariya joined the Portland Winterhawks coaching staff

== Personal ==
Kariya's sister Noriko is a professional boxer and his brother Martin is also a professional hockey player. He and Martin are the first and only brothers to have won the Veli-Pekka Ketola trophy. Steve is the brother of Paul Kariya.

== Awards and honors ==
Award	Year
All-Hockey East Rookie Team	1995–96
Hockey East All-Tournament Team	1998
All-Hockey East First Team	1998–99
AHCA East First-Team All-American	1998–99

- Awarded the NCAA Hockey East Sportsmanship Award in 1997, 1998 and 1999.
- NCAA Champion with University of Maine in 1999.
- Awarded the Veli-Pekka Ketola trophy (Most points in SM-liiga) in 2005.

== Career statistics ==
			Regular season					Playoffs
Season	Team	League	GP	G	A	Pts	PIM	GP	G	A	Pts	PIM
1994–95	Nanaimo Clippers	BCHL	60	39	60	99	8	—	—	—	—	—
1995–96	University of Maine	HE	39	7	15	22	8	—	—	—	—	—
1996–97	University of Maine	HE	35	19	31	50	10	—	—	—	—	—
1997–98	University of Maine	HE	35	25	25	50	22	—	—	—	—	—
1998–99	University of Maine	HE	41	27	39	65	24	—	—	—	—	—
1999–2000	Syracuse Crunch	AHL	29	18	23	41	22	4	2	1	3	0
1999–2000	Vancouver Canucks	NHL	45	8	11	19	22	—	—	—	—	—
2000–01	Kansas City Blades	IHL	43	15	29	44	51	—	—	—	—	—
2000–01	Vancouver Canucks	NHL	17	1	6	7	8	—	—	—	—	—
2001–02	Manitoba Moose	AHL	67	25	37	62	48	7	1	2	3	2
2001–02	Vancouver Canucks	NHL	3	0	1	1	2	—	—	—	—	—
2002–03	Manitoba Moose	AHL	38	14	14	28	18	—	—	—	—	—
2002–03	Albany River Rats	AHL	31	12	19	31	20	—	—	—	—	—
2003–04	Albany River Rats	AHL	57	17	31	48	28	—	—	—	—	—
2004–05	Ilves	SM-liiga	55	24	35	59	32	7	3	2	5	4
2005–06	Blues	SM-liiga	56	22	27	49	61	9	3	3	6	10
2006–07	Frölunda HC	SEL	55	23	16	39	34	—	—	—	—	—
2007–08	Frölunda HC	SEL	41	1	17	18	18	—	—	—	—	—
2008–09	HPK	SM-liiga	58	21	33	54	26	6	1	2	3	4
2009–10	JYP	SM-liiga	46	16	12	28	20	13	1	1	2	10
AHL totals			222	86	124	210	136	11	3	3	6	0
NHL totals			65	9	18	27	32	—	—	—	—	—
SM-liiga totals			215	83	107	190	139	35	8	8	16	28

Awards and achievements
Preceded by Todd Hall	Len Ceglarski Sportsmanship Award; 1996–97 / 1997–98 / 1998–99	Succeeded by Cory Larose
Preceded by Timo Pärssinen	Winner of the Veli-Pekka Ketola trophy 2004–05	Succeeded by Tony Salmelainen
