= Pasi Saarela =

Finnish ice hockey player

- Born: August 24, 1973 (age 53) Laitila, Finland
- Height: 5 ft 10 in (178 cm)
- Weight: 198 lb (90 kg; 14 st 2 lb)
- Position: Right Wing
- Shot: Right
- Played for: Lukko Rauma; Jokerit; SC Bern; Ässät
- Playing career: 1990–2009

Pasi Saarela (born August 24, 1973 in Finland) is a Finnish professional ice hockey player. Pasi Saarela won the Aarne Honkavaara trophy for best goal scorer in 2005 with the team, Lukko and in 1999 with Jokerit. He has won Sm-liiga championships with Jokerit in 1996 and 1997. He has also played in Switzerland's and Sweden's highest league levels. He now plays for Rauman Lukko.

== Career statistics ==
=== Regular season and playoffs ===
			Regular season					Playoffs
Season	Team	League	GP	G	A	Pts	PIM	GP	G	A	Pts	PIM
1989–90	Lukko	FIN.2 U20	1	0	0	0	0	4	0	0	0	2
1990–91	Lukko	FIN U20	27	20	15	35	14	—	—	—	—	—
1990–91	Lukko	SM-l	8	0	2	2	2	—	—	—	—	—
1991–92	Lukko	SM-l	33	1	1	2	2	2	0	0	0	0
1992–93	Lukko	FIN U20	17	23	7	30	30	—	—	—	—	—
1992–93	Lukko	SM-l	31	4	2	6	6	3	0	0	0	0
1993–94	Lukko	FIN U20	3	0	1	1	22	—	—	—	—	—
1993–94	Lukko	SM-l	37	2	3	5	20	2	0	0	0	2
1994–95	Lukko	SM-l	39	23	19	42	18	9	3	2	5	8
1995–96	Jokerit	SM-l	50	25	18	43	37	11	5	6	11	8
1996–97	Jokerit	SM-l	50	25	21	46	22	9	7	3	10	2
1997–98	Jokerit	SM-l	48	16	15	31	14	8	3	3	6	0
1998–99	Jokerit	SM-l	54	38	20	58	36	3	0	2	2	10
1999–2000	Västra Frölunda HC	SEL	49	17	12	29	18	5	1	0	1	25
2000–01	Lukko	SM-l	55	18	21	39	94	3	2	0	2	2
2001–02	Lukko	SM-l	41	12	7	19	20	—	—	—	—	—
2002–03	Lukko	SM-l	56	15	26	41	30	—	—	—	—	—
2003–04	Lukko	SM-l	56	18	25	43	14	4	0	1	1	0
2004–05	Lukko	SM-l	56	31	24	55	42	9	3	7	10	4
2005–06	Lukko	SM-l	47	8	7	15	18	—	—	—	—	—
2005–06	SC Bern	NLA	3	1	1	2	6	2	1	0	1	4
2006–07	Leksands IF	SWE.2	45	26	17	43	36	9	1	1	2	10
2007–08	Ässät	SM-l	40	12	5	17	30	—	—	—	—	—
2007–08	Lukko	SM-l	17	6	0	6	2	3	0	2	2	2
2008–09	Lukko	SM-l	57	10	16	26	56	—	—	—	—	—
SM-l totals			775	264	232	496	463	66	23	26	49	46

=== International ===
Year	Team	Event	GP	G	A	Pts	PIM
1991	Finland	EJC	6	7	3	10	8
1993	Finland	WJC	7	2	0	2	8
Junior totals			13	9	3	12	16
