= Henry Leppä =

Finnish ice hockey player (1947–2025)

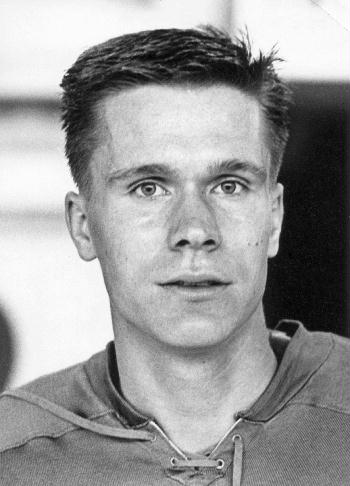
- Born: 12 March 1947 Turku, Finland
- Died: 2 June 2025 (aged 78)
- Height: 5 ft 11 in (180 cm)
- Weight: 163 lb (74 kg; 11 st 9 lb)
- Position: Forward
- Shot: Left
- Played for: TUTO Hockey; Jokerit; HC Lugano
- National team: Finland
- NHL draft: Undrafted
- Playing career: 1962–1981

Henry Erik Leppä (12 March 1947 – 2 June 2025) was a Finnish professional ice hockey player who played in the SM-liiga. He played for Jokerit and TuTo. He was inducted into the Finnish Hockey Hall of Fame in 1996. Leppä was born in Turku, Finland on 12 March 1947, and died on 2 June 2025, at the age of 78.

== Career statistics ==
			Regular season					Playoffs
Season	Team	League	GP	G	A	Pts	PIM	GP	G	A	Pts	PIM
1962–63	TUTO Hockey	SM-sarja	6	3	2	5	0	—	—	—	—	—
1965–66	TUTO Hockey	SM-sarja	17	4	2	6	6	—	—	—	—	—
1966–67	TUTO Hockey	SM-sarja	22	9	6	15	4	—	—	—	—	—
1967–68	TUTO Hockey	SM-sarja	20	13	7	20	8	—	—	—	—	—
1968–69	TUTO Hockey	SM-sarja	19	2	5	7	4	—	—	—	—	—
1969–70	Jokerit	SM-sarja	21	5	6	11	2	—	—	—	—	—
1970–71	Jokerit	SM-sarja	26	9	6	15	4	—	—	—	—	—
1971–72	Jokerit	SM-sarja	32	19	19	38	4	—	—	—	—	—
1972–73	Jokerit	SM-sarja	35	29	13	42	6	—	—	—	—	—
1973–74	Jokerit	SM-sarja	35	25	18	43	12	—	—	—	—	—
1974–75	Jokerit	SM-sarja	36	22	21	43	8	—	—	—	—	—
1975–76	Jokerit	SM-liiga	36	18	26	44	12	—	—	—	—	—
1976–77	HC Lugano	NLB	—	—	—	—	—	—	—	—	—	—
1977–78	Jokerit	SM-liiga	34	12	11	23	6	—	—	—	—	—
1978–79	Jokerit	SM-liiga	36	10	14	24	4	—	—	—	—	—
1979–80	Jokerit	SM-liiga	36	26	22	48	10	—	—	—	—	—
1980–81	Jokerit	SM-liiga	36	4	12	16	8	—	—	—	—	—
SM-liiga totals			178	70	85	155	40	—	—	—	—	—
