= Harkimo =

Harkimo is Finnish surname. Notable people with the surname include:

- Harry Harkimo (born 1953), Finnish businessman
- Leena Harkimo (born 1963), Finnish politician and business executive
- Osmo Harkimo (1923–2007), Finnish cinematographer
