= Matti Virmanen =

Finnish ice hockey player and scout

- Born: November 30, 1960 (age 65) Helsinki, FIN
- Height: 5 ft 11 in (180 cm)
- Weight: 197 lb (89 kg; 14 st 1 lb)
- Position: Forward
- Shot: Left
- Played for: SM-liiga; Jokerit; 1. Divisioona; Vantaa HT; 2. Divisioona; LeKi-75; Norwegian League; Bergen Flyers
- Playing career: 1980–1992; 2001–2002

Matti Virmanen (born November 30, 1960, in Helsinki, Finland) is a retired Ice hockey player and currently a professional scout for the Edmonton Oilers. In addition, he works as a player coordinator for Finnish hockey league team Vaasan Sport.

== Playing career ==
=== Jokerit ===
During his playing career, Virmanen played his only SM-liiga games for Jokerit. Virmanen played 4 games for Jokerit in 1980/81 SM-liiga season. During his junior seasons for Jokerit, Virmanen played on the same junior team with future NHL-player, Esa Tikkanen

=== Years in Norway ===
After Jokerit, Virmanen played 4 seasons for Norwegian team Djerv. Virmanen led the Norwegian League in points for 1982/83 season.

=== Return to Finland and Retirement ===
After his seasons in Norway, Virmanen returned to Finland and settled to Vantaa-area. Virmanen finished his playing career in Vantaa-HT for which he played for couple of seasons. Virmanen retired in 1997.

Virmanen made a short return as player in 2001/02 season when he played for Second Division team LeKi-75.

== Career after Retirement ==
After Retirement, Virmanen worked in Jokerit organization, which he had joined in 1992. Virmanen replaced Leena Harkimo as the General Manager for Jokerit in 1999. Virmanen's tenure as General Manager ended in 2008 when he was moved to work as the Director of Sports Activities for Jokerit. Virmanen was succeeded as GM of Jokerit by Keijo Säilynoja.

Preceded by Leena Harkimo	General Manager of Jokerit; 1999-2008	Succeeded by Keijo Säilynoja
Preceded by position established	Jokerit Director of Sports Activities; 2008-	Succeeded by current
