= Lalli Partinen =

Finnish ice hockey player (1941–2022)

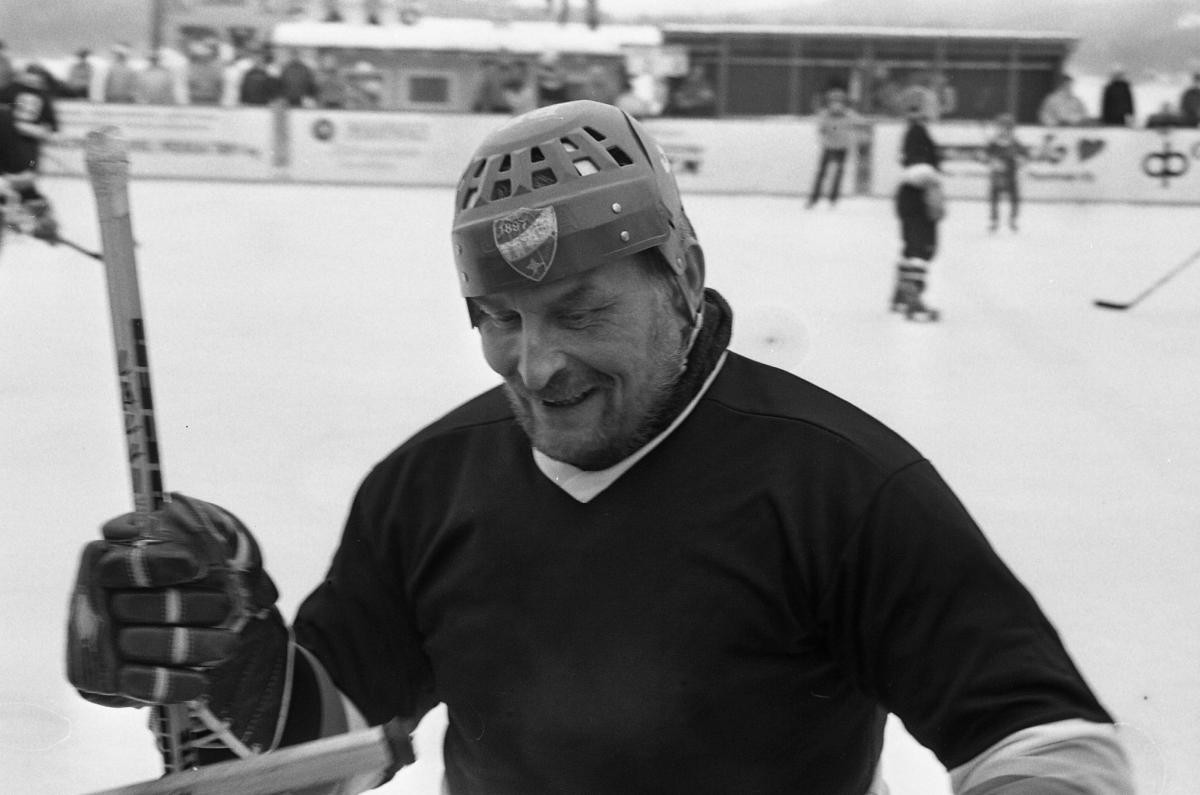
- Lalli Partinen in 1988
- Born: 20 August 1941 Kannonkoski, Finland
- Died: 4 May 2022 (aged 80) Lappeenranta, Finland
- Height: 6 ft 1 in (185 cm)
- Weight: 218 lb (99 kg; 15 st 8 lb)
- Position: Left wing
- Shot: Left
- Played for: SaiPa; HIFK
- National team: Finland
- Playing career: 1959–1977

Lalli Simo Samuli Partinen (20 August 1941 – 4 May 2022) was a Finnish professional ice hockey player who played in the SM-liiga.

== Biography ==
Partinen played for HIFK and SaiPa. He competed in the men's tournament at the 1968 Winter Olympics. Partinen also represented Finland at the Hockey World Championships during the years: 1965, 1966, 1969, 1970, 1973. He also won two Finnish championships in seasons 1969–70 and 1973–74. He was inducted into the Finnish Hockey Hall of Fame in 1987.

Partinen died of COVID-19 at a hospital in Lappeenranta on 4 May 2022, aged 80.

== Honours ==
HIFK Hockey

- Finnish Ice Hockey Championship: 1969–70, 1973–74

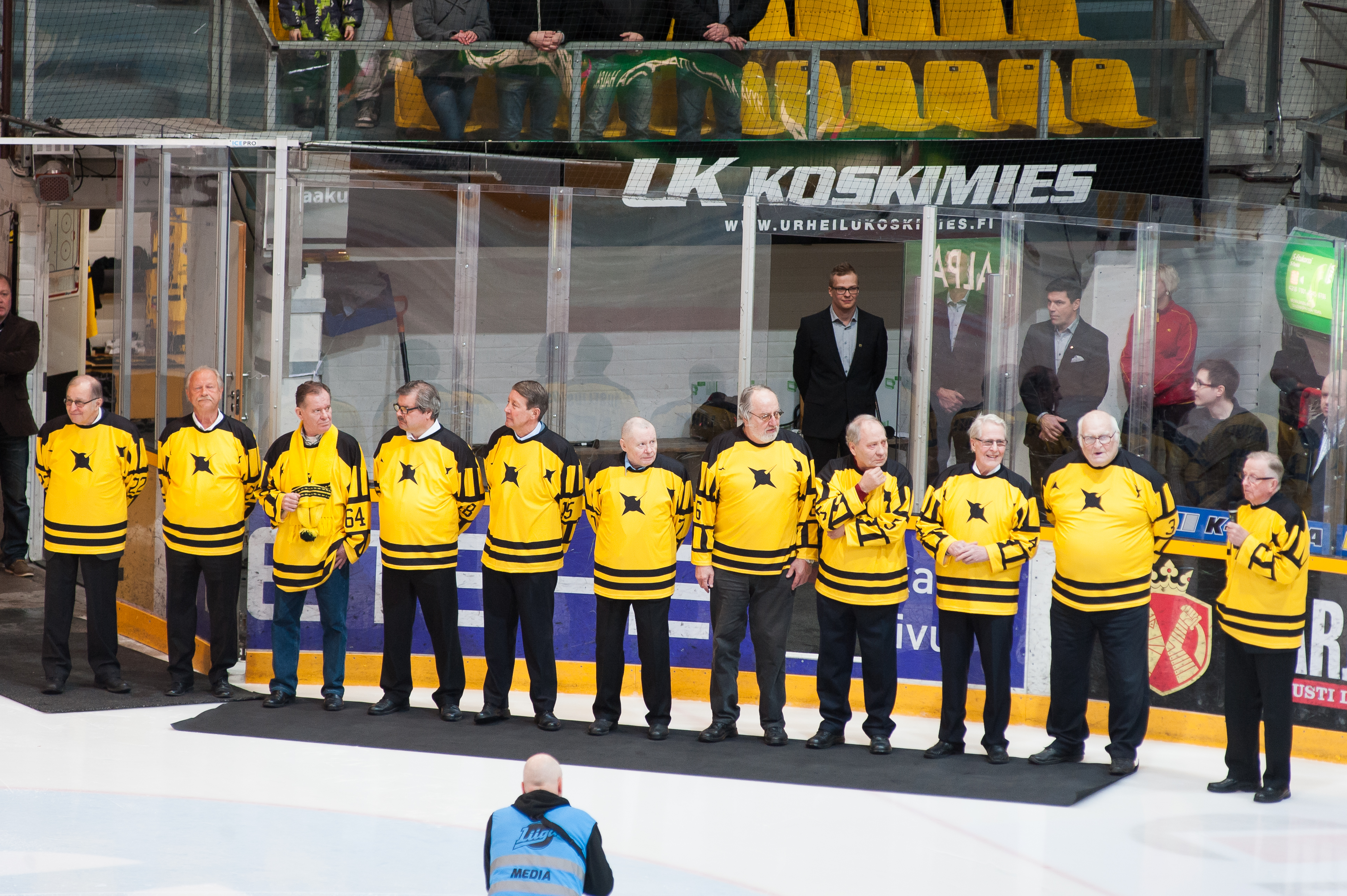
50th anniversary of SaiPa's 1965-1966 bronze medal team, Partinen (second right)
