= Timo Turunen =

Finnish ice hockey player

- Born: April 8, 1948 (age 77) Kuusjärvi, FIN
- Height: 5 ft 7 in (170 cm)
- Weight: 162 lb (73 kg; 11 st 8 lb)
- Position: Centre
- Shot: Left
- Played for: SM-liiga; Jokerit; 1. Divisioona; Jäähonka; Elitserien; Södertälje SK
- National team: Finland
- Playing career: 1969–1978

Timo Mikko Juhani Turunen (born April 8, 1948, in Kuusjärvi, Finland) is a Finnish retired professional ice hockey player who played in the SM-liiga. He played for Jokerit. He was inducted into the Finnish Hockey Hall of Fame in 2004.

== Playing career ==
Most notably Turunen was part of Jokerit's top line which consisted of Pentti Hiiros and Timo Kyntölä. Due to the line's short height (Hiiros was the tallest at 172 cm of height), the line was nicknamed "Nallipyssy-ketju", "The Cap-Gun line".

Even though, Turunen was a prolific player for Jokerit and he served as the captain of the team for two separate occasions.

Turunen ended his playing career in 1981.

Preceded by Erkki Mononen	Captain of Jokerit; 1971-1976	Succeeded by Pentti Hiiros
Preceded by Pentti Hiiros	Captain of Jokerit; 1978	Succeeded by Jari Kapanen
