= Pasi Nielikäinen =

Finnish ice hockey player

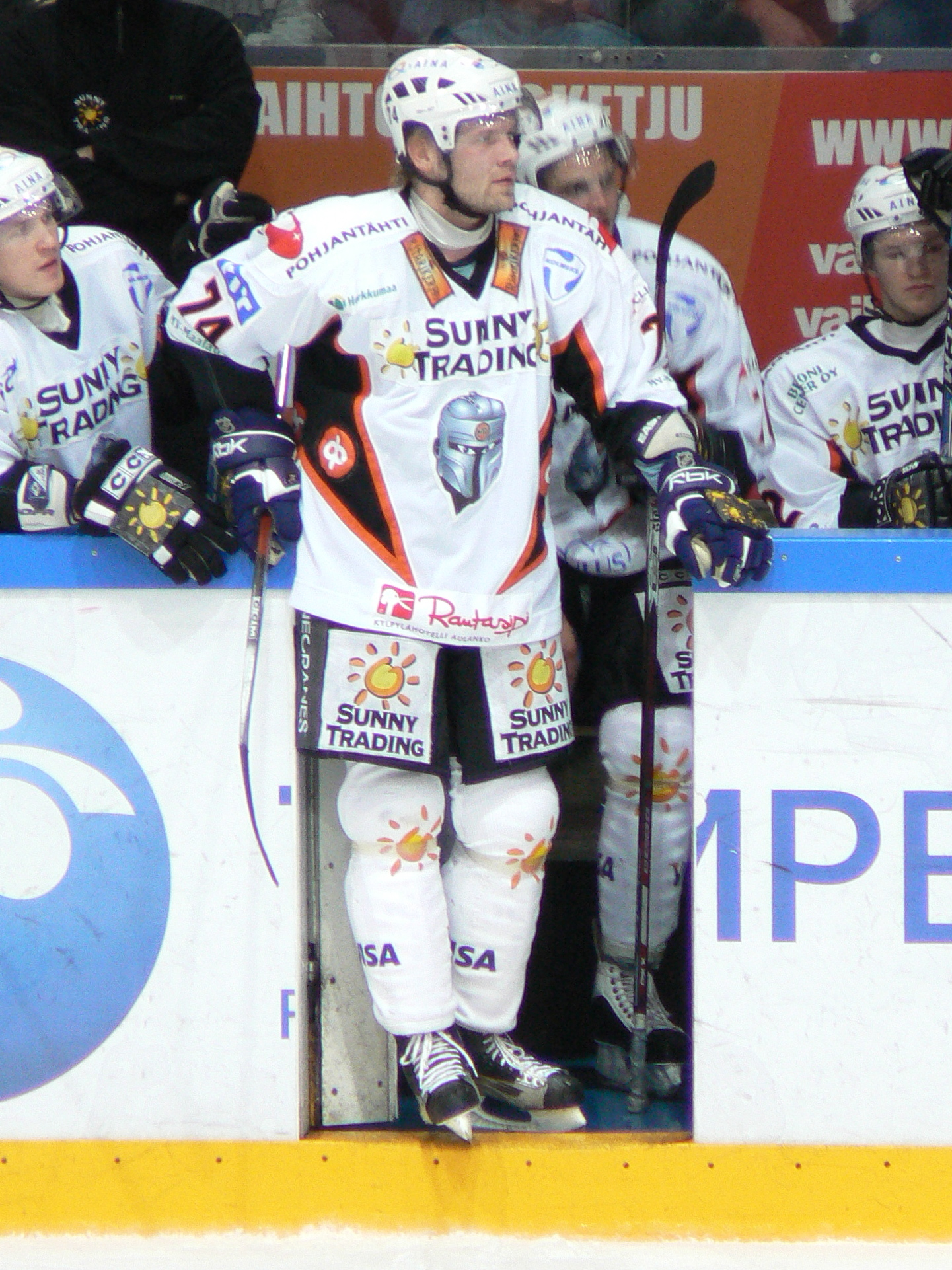
- Born: 11 February 1974 (age 51) Oulainen, FIN
- Height: 6 ft 2 in (188 cm)
- Weight: 213 lb (97 kg; 15 st 3 lb)
- Position: Right winger
- Shoots: Left
- SM-liiga team Former teams: Jokerit; HIFK; Ässät; SaiPa; Kärpät; HPK; Mestis; Kiekko-Vantaa; Hermes; 1. Divisioona; Junkkarit HT; 2. Divisioona; Diskos; Nivala Cowboys; ECHL; Miami Matadors; BISL; Manchester Storm
- Playing career: 1992–present

Pasi Nielikäinen (born 11 February 1974, Oulainen, Finland) is a former professional ice hockey player.

== Playing career ==
Nielikäinen has played for numerous teams in the Finnish SM-liiga; these include Kärpät, HIFK and HPK.

Nielikäinen also played one season in East Coast Hockey League for the Miami Matadors and one season for the British team the Manchester Storm.

== Style of play ==
Nielikäinen is not a usual Finnish hockey player when it comes to playing. Nielikäinen is known for serving as an enforcer for his team. Nielikäinen also is not shy when it comes to dropping gloves and scrapping on the ice.

Nielikäinen's most famous rivalries include the one with fellow SM-liiga player Sami Helenius and his single fight against NHL-enforcer Ryan Vandenbusche in the 2005/06 season for which HIFK and Jokerit got fined 15.000 euros/team.

== Off the ice ==
Nielikäinen is married to former Finnish Beauty contestant Jenni Nielikäinen (née Anttila)
