= Suomen sarja =

2nd level of ice hockey in Finland (1935–1974)

Suomen Sarja
- Sport: ice hockey
- Founded: 1935; 91 years ago
- Folded: 1974; 52 years ago
- Replaced by: I-Divisioona
- No. of teams: 3 to 24
- Country: Finland
- Last champion: Saimaan Pallo
- Level on pyramid: Level 2
- Promotion to: SM-sarja
- Relegation to: Maakuntasarja (regional league)
- Domestic cup: Finnish Cup

Suomen sarja (sometimes also known as Suomensarja and Valtakunnansarja (1935-1946), meaning in English Finland's series and Nation's series respectively) was the second-level league in men's ice hockey in Finland from 1935 to 1974.

It was replaced by I-divisioona for the season 1974-75.

== Champions ==
- 1936 Åbo IFK
- 1937 Turun Riento
- 1938 HSK
- 1939 TPS
- 1943 HPK
- 1945 Tampereen Palloilijat
- 1946 Turun Pallokerho
- 1947 ÅIFK
- 1948 HJK
- 1950 Karhu-Kissat
- 1951 HPK
- 1952 TPS
- 1953 TK-V
- 1954 Lukko
- 1955 Ilves
- 1956 Kokkolan Jymy
- 1957 KalPa
- 1958 TK-V
- 1959 SaiPa
- 1960 Töölön Vesa
- 1961 Porin Karhut
- 1962 Töölön Vesa
- 1963 TPS
- 1964 HIFK
- 1965 Lahden Reipas, Kärpät and TuTo
- 1966 Hermes, SaPKo and Tappara
- 1967 HIFK, Kärpät and Upon Pallo
- 1968 Lukko, SaPKo and Vehmaisten Urheilijat
- 1969 Jokerit
- 1970 HJK
- 1971 JoKP
- 1972 SaiPa
- 1973 Lukko
- 1974 SaiPa
