= Timo Sutinen =

Finnish ice hockey player

- Born: April 3, 1949 (age 76) Tampere, Finland
- Height: 5 ft 11 in (180 cm)
- Weight: 181 lb (82 kg; 12 st 13 lb)
- Position: Forward
- Shot: Left
- Played for: KOOVEE; Jokerit; FoPS; VfL Bad Nauheim; Berliner SC Preussen
- National team: Finland
- Playing career: 1966–1985

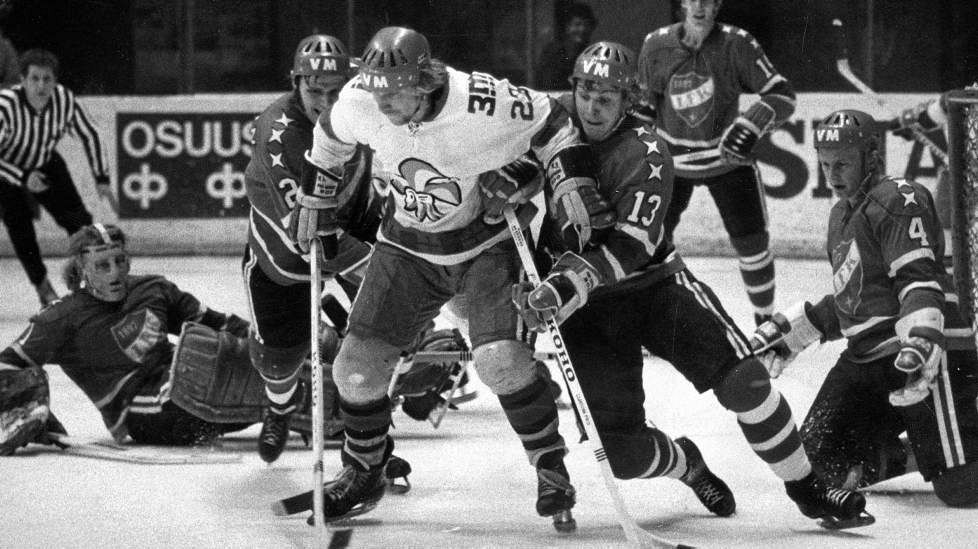
Timo Sutinen (middle) plays against HIFK in 1971.

Timo Sutinen (born April 3, 1949 in Tampere, Finland) is a retired professional ice hockey player who played in the SM-liiga. He played in the SM-sarja and SM-liiga for KOOVEE, Jokerit, and FoPS. He also played in Germany's Eishockey-Bundesliga for VfL Bad Nauheim and Berliner SC Preussen. He was inducted into the Finnish Hockey Hall of Fame in 1991.
