= Jokerit =

Professional ice hockey club based in Helsinki, Finland

- Nickname: Jokers, Jesters
- City: Helsinki, Finland
- League: Liiga
- Founded: 1967
- Home arena: Veikkaus Arena (capacity: 13,349)
- Colours
- Owners: Jokerit Helsinki Oy
- President: Mikko Saarni
- General manager: TBA.
- Head coach: Juuso Hahl
- Captain: Markus Hännikäinen
- Affiliates: Kiekko-Vantaa
- Website: www.jokerit.fi

Championships
- SM-sarja / SM-liiga: 1973, 1992, 1994, 1996, 1997, 2002
- European Cup: 1994, 1995
- Continental Cup: 2003

Helsingin Jokerit (Finnish pronunciation: [ˈjokerit], English: Jokers or Jesters of Helsinki) is a professional ice hockey team based in Helsinki, Finland. They currently compete in the top-tier Liiga for the 2026–27 season. Jokerit plays its home games at the Veikkaus Arena in Helsinki.

Founded in 1967, the team has a rich history of success, having secured six league championships as a prominent member of the Finnish SM-Liiga in the years 1973, 1992, 1994, 1996, 1997, and 2002. Additionally, Jokerit has three European championships to its name, having triumphed in the IIHF European Cup in 1994 and 1995, as well as the IIHF Continental Cup in 2003.

Starting in the 2014–15 season, Jokerit became part of the Bobrov Division of the Kontinental Hockey League (KHL) Western Conference, marking Finland as the first Nordic country to have a team competing in this international league. However, due to the Russian invasion of Ukraine in February 2022, Jokerit made the decision to withdraw from the 2022 KHL playoffs. This move was followed by the termination of several team sponsor and supplier contracts, including the home arena's name rights holder Hartwall, as a response to the invasion. As a result, on 5 April 2022, Jokerit officially announced their decision to withdraw from the league entirely.

After three seasons in the second-tier Mestis (2023–2026), during which the club successfully rebuilt its fan base and financial operations, it was announced on 10 February 2026 that Jokerit had been granted a league license to rejoin Liiga. The club is scheduled to begin play in the top division starting in the 2026–2027 season, marking their return to the top flight for the first time since 2014.

== History ==
=== Establishment and Early years (1967–1969) ===
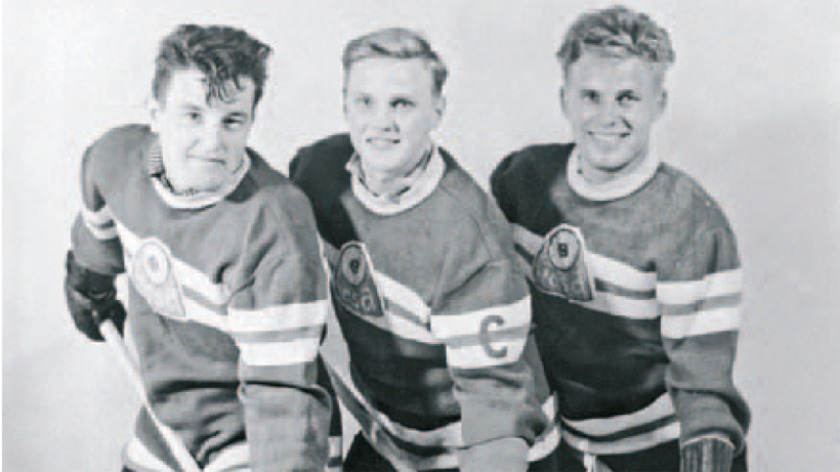
Töölön Vesa was the predecessor of Jokerit. Players in the picture are Veikko Haapakoski, Pentti Simola and Kai Halimo between 1955 and 1964.

Jokerit, the prominent ice hockey club from Finland, owes its existence to a crucial turning point in the country's sporting landscape.

In 1967, the ice hockey branch of Töölön Vesa, an amateur sports club grappling with significant debts, faced the difficult decision of discontinuing their resource-demanding ice hockey activities. Seizing this opportune moment, Aimo Mäkinen, a master-builder with an ardent passion for the sport, saw the potential to establish a new semi-professional sports club.

In an unusual arrangement, Jokerit came into being by assuming half of Vesa's ice hockey debts and inheriting all their assets, including junior players and a coveted position in the Suomensarja, the second highest tier of Finnish ice hockey.

On 27 October 1967, Jokerit officially took shape during a momentous constitutional meeting, with Mäkinen assuming the role of the club's sole owner and wielding sovereign power, effectively acting as the board and managing director. The club adopted an emblem depicting a winking jester, creatively adapted from various jokers found in diverse card decks, designed meticulously by graphic artist Jorma Hinkka. The Helsinki Ice Hall became the revered home venue for the new club.

=== Promotion to SM-sarja (1969–1979) ===
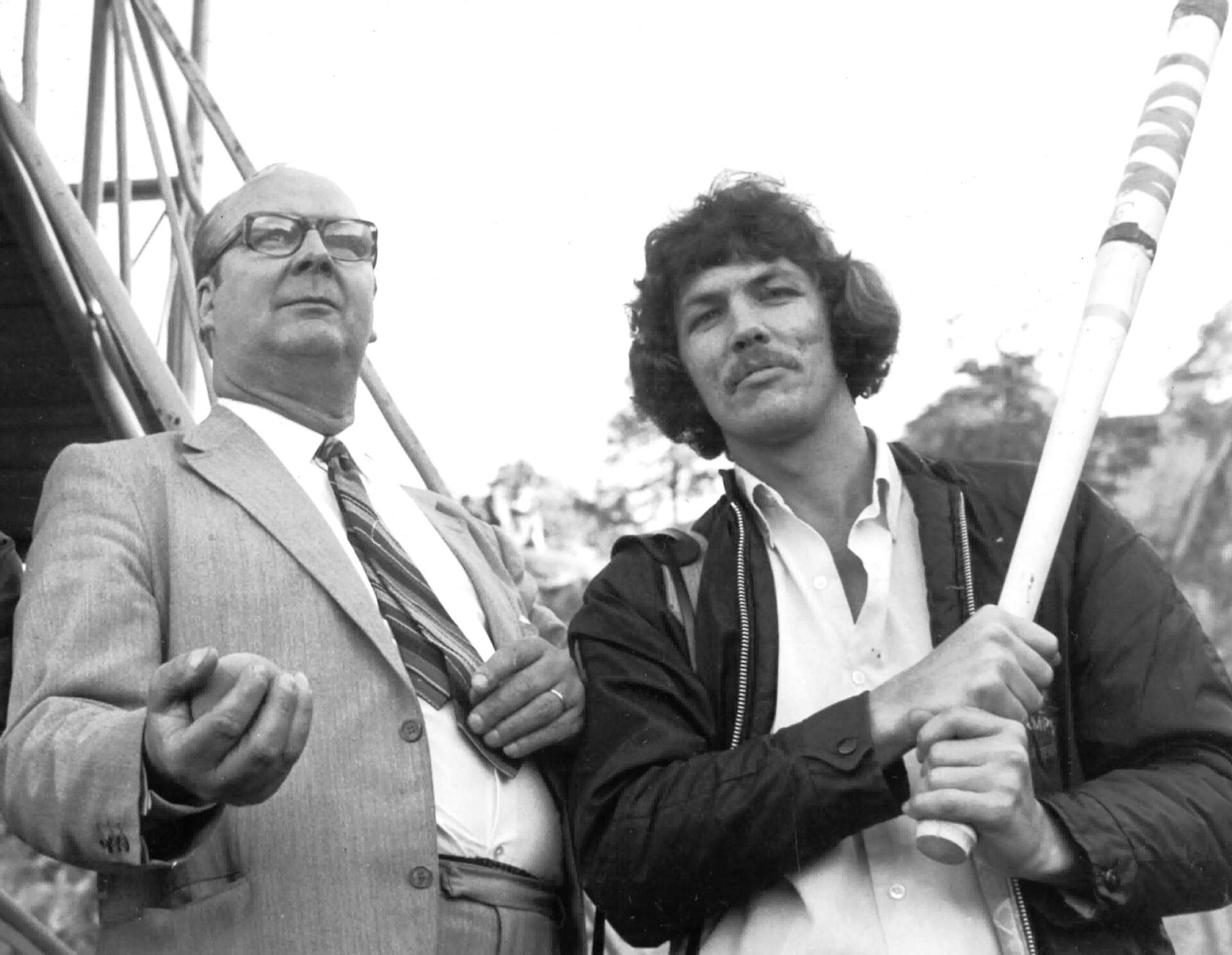
Jokerit founder Aimo Mäkinen and Canadian player Dwight Watson in 1971

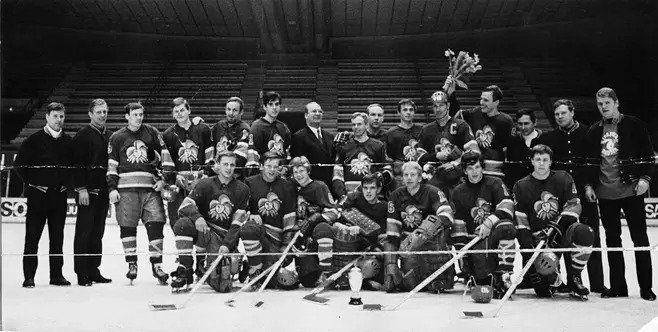
Jokerit celebrated the promotion to SM-sarja (Liiga), in spring 1969.

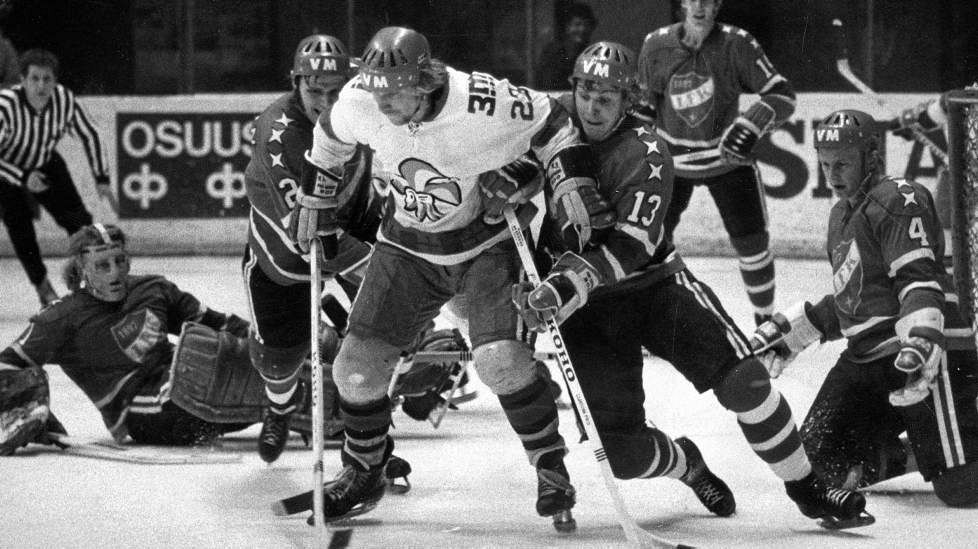
Jokerit against HIFK in 1971

Promotion to the highest level, SM-sarja, was achieved two years later in 1969, marking a pivotal moment in Jokerit's history. Aiming to strengthen the team for the challenges ahead, Aimo Mäkinen, as the club's sole owner, embarked on an assertive campaign to acquire star players. Notable additions included national team regulars, such as defenceman Ilpo Koskela, Veli-Pekka Ketola and forwards Henry Leppä and Timo Sutinen, who would go on to establish enduring connections with the club.

Subsequent to these initial reinforcements, Jokerit further bolstered its roster with noteworthy signings, including forward Jouko Öystilä and defenceman Timo Saari. Additionally, the club appointed head coach Matti Lampainen to lead the team. Notably, in 1969, the International Ice Hockey Federation (IIHF) revised its rules, allowing bodychecking anywhere on the ice, thus prompting a tactical transformation in SM-sarja. While physical and aggressive play became a prevailing strategy for many teams, Lampainen steered Jokerit towards a different path, recognizing the unsuitability of such an approach for the current lineup, particularly of the "nallipyssyketju" players. Instead, he emphasized a style of play that hinged on technique and strategic finesse. This unique playing philosophy became Jokerit's trademark, enduring until the late 1990s.

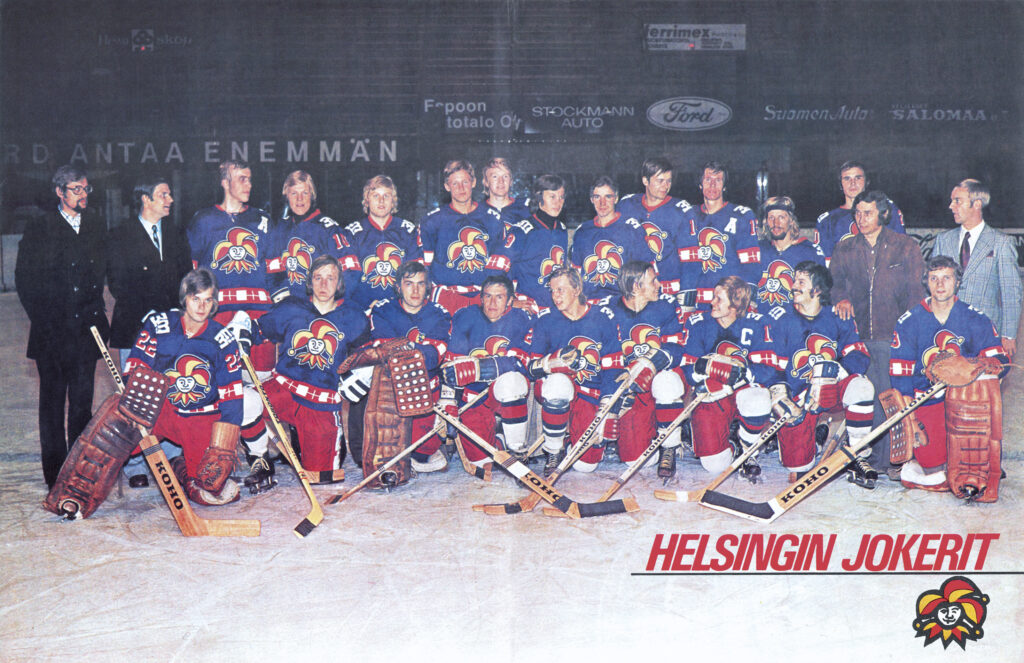
Jokerit in the 1972–73 season

Mäkinen also prioritized the development of the club's junior organization, introducing the Kanada-sarja competition. This initiative attracted 500 aspiring junior players initially, with the number rapidly increasing over the ensuing years. Although Kanada-sarja did not survive beyond the 1970s, its impact was felt as Jokerit benefited from a consistent influx of emerging talent, including future stars like Jari Kurri. Moreover, the club's popularity flourished, especially in the outer urban zones of Helsinki.

Despite their on-ice achievements, notably securing Finnish championship silver in 1971 and a winning their first championship in 1973, financial profitability remained elusive during Mäkinen's stewardship. In response, Mäkinen strategically downsized the team's budget by prioritizing the integration of junior players to replace departing stars. As a result, Jokerit experienced a gradual decline in its success, narrowly avoiding relegation from the Finnish elite-level league on multiple occasions. These challenges, compounded by Mäkinen's controversial management style, which emphasized non-physical play, created an aura of uncertainty and turbulence for the club's future. Jokerit stood at a crossroads, facing critical decisions to secure its stability and enduring legacy in Finnish ice hockey.

=== Success and financial troubles (1980–1990) ===
In 1980, a replacement candidate emerged, leading Aimo Mäkinen to retire from his ownership role. However, he continued to contribute to the club's junior organization until the 1990s. Subsequently, the ownership of Jokerit transitioned to new hands, overseen by Jokeriklubin Tuki Ry, a conventional association with a supervisory board.

Under the stewardship of the new management, the club faced initial challenges in shaking off its previous struggles. Nonetheless, there was a remarkable upturn for one season when Jokerit signed players who were considered outcasts from other clubs. The turning point came during the 1982–83 season when Jokerit secured the services of Nikolai Makarov, a defenseman from the Soviet Union's national team. This significant addition led to an almost flawless season, propelling the team all the way to the SM-Liiga finals, where they faced local rivals HIFK in a best-of-five series. Jokerit won the first two match-ups and held a 2–0 lead halfway through the decisive fifth game, but HIFK came from behind to take the match and the series 3–2.

Unfortunately, the elation of the successful season was short-lived as unexpected financial problems surfaced for the management. The brief resurgence faded, and within a few years, the club found itself facing the imminent threat of bankruptcy not once but twice. This financial turmoil dealt a blow to the club's credibility and resulted in a mass exodus of players. Key players like wing Risto Kerminen departed, and center Jari Lindroos came close to leaving the club after signing elsewhere. Though Lindroos' contract was illegitimately nullified, the team faced a challenging period. Only a few loyal players, including longtime goaltender Rauli Sohlman, remained steadfast during this trying time.

In 1986–87 season Jokerit were at the bottom of the league and were relegated.

When Jokeriklubin Tuki Ry contemplated discontinuing their association with the club, a renewed sense of hope was infused into Jokerit. The year 1988 saw their 20-year-old players claim victory in the Finnish junior championship, showcasing several prospective stars. Notable among them were defenceman Waltteri Immonen, who would later serve as captain from 1991 to 1999, and Mika Strömberg, who became the club's all-time leading scoring defenceman. Ari Sulander emerged as the main goaltender from 1993 to 1998, while forward Keijo Säilynoja displayed remarkable goal-scoring abilities and prowess in penalty shots. Most notably, Teemu Selänne, who would go on to achieve records in the National Hockey League (NHL), stood among the promising talents.

In the 1988–89 season with the infusion of promising junior champions, Jokerit orchestrated a swift return to the top tier, now known as SM-liiga.

Despite the newfound popularity supported by standout scorer Selänne and other young stars, the club's owners encountered severe financial difficulties stemming from inadequate management and internal board disagreements. These challenges posed significant hurdles as Jokerit navigated a precarious path toward securing its financial stability and future prosperity.

To fortify the club's position, enthusiastic new owners stepped forward to rescue Jokerit. In a groundbreaking move, they established Jokeri-Hockey Oy, becoming the first limited company-based sports club in Finland. Kalervo Kummola played a prominent role in assembling the company and served on its board until 2002.

=== The Harkimo ownership era begins (1991–1999) ===
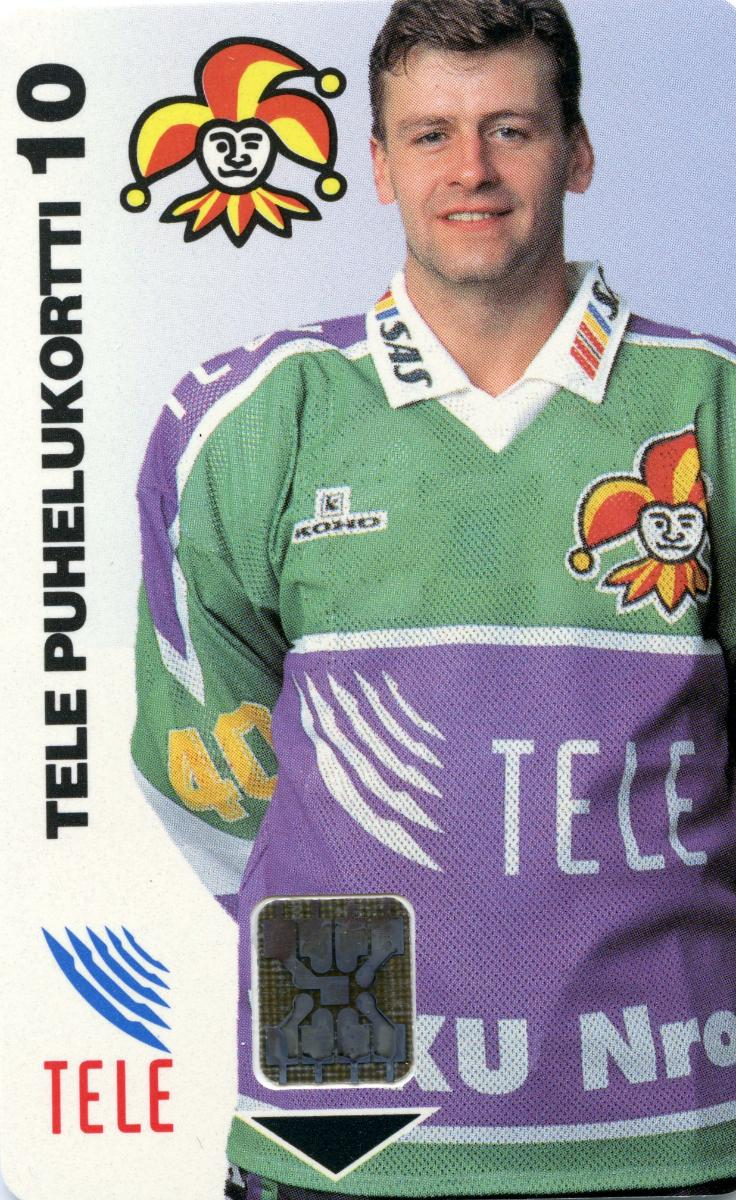
Otakar Janecký in Telephone card

In 1991, Jokerit underwent a significant shift when an investor withdrew, leading to board member Harry "Hjallis" Harkimo assuming a double majority of shares. Harkimo took on the role of chairman of the board and implemented changes by dissolving all managerial positions, appointing his wife, Leena Harkimo, as the managing director. This marked a turning point for the club, as the internal disagreements dissipated, and Harry Harkimo's proficient business acumen facilitated a swift recovery of the club's financial standing. In a short span, Jokerit emerged as the wealthiest sports club in Finland.

With newfound financial strength, the club made strategic signings, securing first-class talent to reinforce the team. Key acquisitions included Otakar Janecký, who became a central figure as the first-line center and the club's all-time leading point scorer; Petri Varis, who excelled as the club's top goal scorer in the 1990s; and forward Antti Törmänen. Alongside the aforementioned junior champions, these players formed the core of a thriving dynasty. Jokerit celebrated Finnish championships in 1992, 1994, 1996, and 1997, as well as European Cup victories in 1995 and 1996. They also earned a Finnish silver and European bronze during this successful period.

Under Harkimo's leadership, the club embraced a shift towards professional sports entertainment, taking inspiration from the NHL model.

In 1997, Jokerit achieved a momentous milestone by becoming the first privately owned European club to have its own home venue, Hartwall Arena. To facilitate this transformation, the ownership structure was reorganized into Jokerit HC Oyj, a public limited company. The club strategically focused on the new European Hockey League, anticipating its potential for increased revenue compared to SM-Liiga. While some expansion plans did not materialize, Hartwall Arena proved to be a lucrative venture for the club's business.

Additionally, Harry Harkimo endeavored to create an elite team, the Newcastle Jesters, to participate in the British Ice Hockey Superleague. Though its success did not meet expectations, and the franchise was eventually sold back to the league.

With Hartwall Arena as their new home, Jokerit signed several star players to further strengthen the team. Despite boasting talented line-ups, the team's performance experienced fluctuations, with their most notable achievement being a Finnish bronze medal in 1998. In an ironic twist, Jokerit's long-standing rival, HIFK, claimed the SM-Liiga title in 1998, the very first year of Jokerit's occupancy at Hartwall Arena .

=== Into the next millennium (2000–2004) ===
As the new millennium dawned, the management shifted their focus back to SM-Liiga, aiming to cultivate a more stable approach. However, there was a notable turnover rate in the line-ups between seasons, and a distinct core of players failed to develop or be retained.

In the 1999–2000 season, Jokerit fielded a strong team, including players like German international Jan Benda, Russian Dmitri Kvartalnov, Czech Miroslav Hlinka, long-time Jokerit alumni Petri Varis, and Finnish top players Antti-Jussi Niemi, Tom Koivisto, and Pasi Nurminen in goal. The team was further bolstered by the addition of former NHL players Tuomas Grönman and five-time Stanley Cup champion Esa Tikkanen. Despite their strength, Jokerit reached the finals but fell short, losing the series to TPS three games to one.

While the club reached the finals in 2000, they experienced repeated disappointments in the European Hockey League, which did not live up to expectations.

In the subsequent season, Jokerit faced challenges despite the presence of players like Jukka Hentunen and Antti Törmänen, who were meant to bolster the team.

The 2001–02 season saw the team welcome players like Pavel Rosa, Frank Banham, and 1995 world champion Ville Peltonen. With stellar performances by goaltender Kari Lehtonen and the acquisition of Vladimir Machulda from SaiPa, Jokerit clinched their sixth Finnish championship in 2002.

However, the following two seasons, 2002–03 and 2003–04, yielded no medals for Jokerit. In 2003, the club acquired forward Glen Metropolit from the Washington Capitals (NHL) organization, and he became a key player for Jokerit in both the regular season and playoffs, as well as the 2004–05 regular season. Another important addition was goaltender Tim Thomas, acquired from the Boston Bruins (NHL) organization. Thomas's exceptional performance earned him the prestigious Kultainen kypärä award.

During the 2004–05 NHL lockout, Jokerit brought in Brian Campbell and welcomed Ossi Väänänen back to the team from the Colorado Avalanche. Teemu Selänne also joined the lineup, although he was unable to play due to injury. Jokerit emerged as contenders and looked poised to win the regular season and championship but faltered in the late stages, finishing as silver medalists after losing to Kärpät in the finals.

=== Post-2005 NHL lockout (2005–2006) ===
Following the conclusion of the NHL lockout in 2005, Jokerit faced significant player departures to both NHL teams and European clubs. Notable departures included Brian Campbell, Ossi Väänänen, Teemu Selänne, Glen Metropolit, Pasi Häkkinen, Valtteri Filppula, and Tomi Mäki. The final blow came just one day before the start of the regular season when goaltender Tim Thomas signed with the Boston Bruins.

In response to the loss of Thomas, Jokerit attempted to fill the void with goalkeeper Karl Goehring. However, Goehring's tenure was short-lived, and he was soon replaced by ex-NHL player Steve Passmore. A mid-season pairing with HIFK's Tom Askey also failed to adequately replace Tim Thomas. Despite efforts to strengthen the lineup with players like Eric Beaudoin and Justin Mapletoft, the team struggled to find its footing during the early season.

Adding to the challenges, Jokerit entrusted rookie coach Waltteri Immonen with his coaching debut. Immonen, a long-time Jokerit player transitioning into a head coaching role, faced a daunting task. After a discouraging start for the 2005–06 season with a record of 5–11–4 in the first 20 games, Immonen was relieved of his coaching duties in November. Curt Lindström was brought in as a replacement coach in an attempt to salvage the team's performance. However, despite the coaching change, Jokerit faced an unprecedented outcome for the first time in 16 years as they failed to qualify for the playoffs. This marked a period of significant challenges for the club as they navigated a transitional phase in their roster and coaching staff.

=== The Doug Shedden Era (2006–2008) ===
Following a challenging season that resulted in Jokerit's lowest ranking in decades, the club underwent significant changes by appointing former NHL player and head coach of HIFK, Doug Shedden, to lead the team. Shedden's arrival brought several notable players to Jokerit, including Kim Hirschovits from HIFK, Jyrki Louhi from the 2005–06 champions HPK, and Juuso Riksman from Ässät, the second-place team in 2006. Additionally, the team acquired scoring talent Tim Stapleton and experienced NHL player Clarke Wilm, who had previously worked with Shedden during their time with the Toronto Maple Leafs.

Shedden's inaugural season with Jokerit proved to be a success, as the team returned to the playoffs and achieved a memorable victory over the reigning champions HPK in the semi-finals. Although Jokerit ultimately fell to Kärpät in the finals, the 2006–07 season marked a promising start for Shedden's tenure with the club.

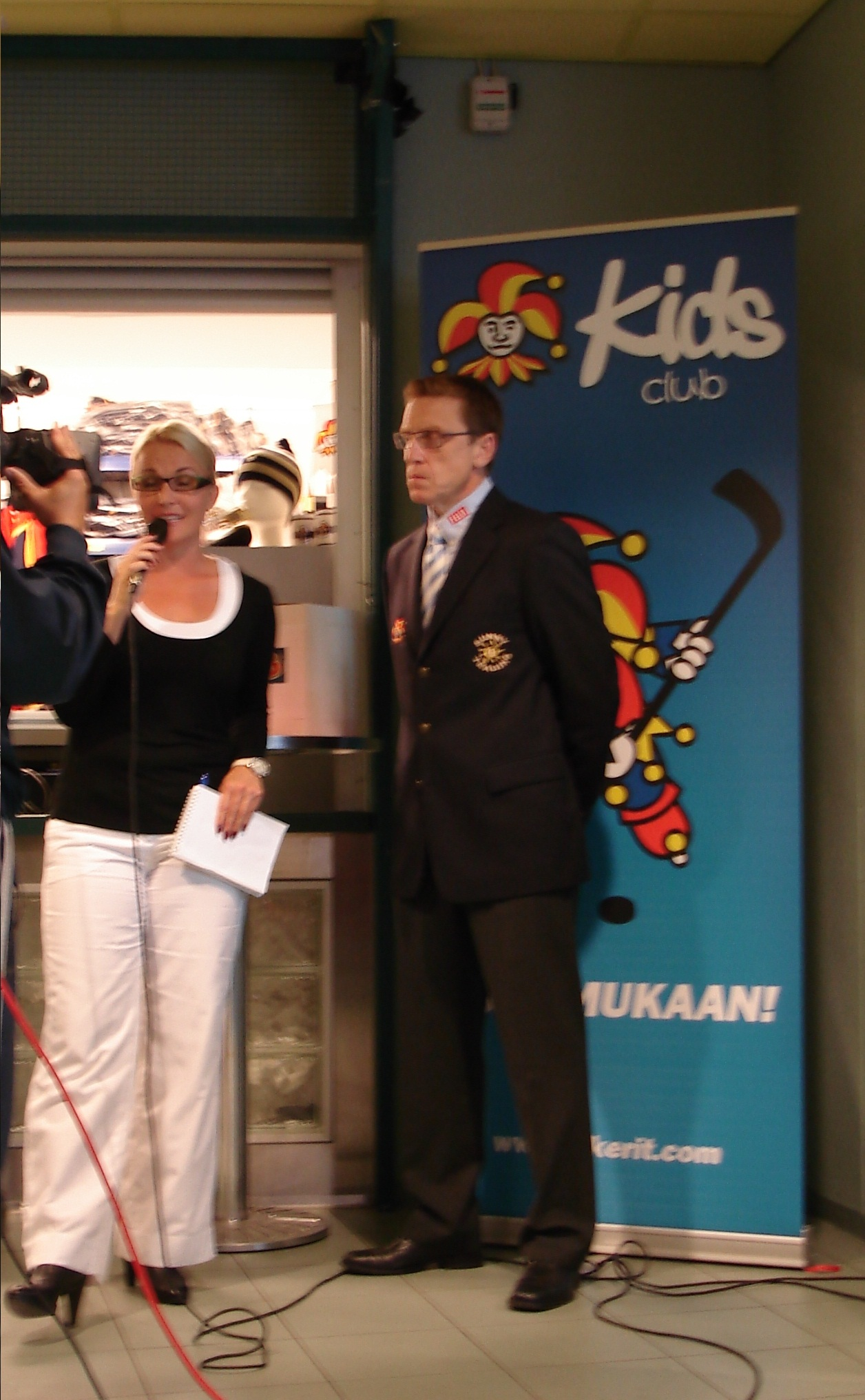
Glen Hanlon in September 2008 when he coached Jokerit

During the 2007–08 season, Jokerit celebrated their 40th anniversary, commemorating the club's rich history. On 27 October, the jersey of former Jokerit alumnus Jari Kurri was retired, honoring his contributions to the team. To strengthen the goaltending department, Jokerit acquired former NHL and Finnish national team goaltender Jussi Markkanen to replace Scott Langkow before the season. They also added more NHL experience by signing former Atlanta Thrashers and Vancouver Canucks center Tommi Santala after the season had commenced.

As the 2007–08 season progressed, it was announced that Doug Shedden had accepted a contract with the Swiss team EV Zug, signaling his departure from Jokerit after the season's conclusion. Following Shedden's announcement, it was revealed that ex-NHL head coach Glen Hanlon would succeed Shedden as the head coach of Jokerit, taking over the role after Shedden's contract expired.

However, Shedden's final season with Jokerit did not meet the high expectations set for the team. Despite being considered championship contenders, Jokerit faced a setback, losing a 3–1 lead in the series against the Espoo Blues and ultimately falling in the series 3 games to 4. As a result, the club was relegated to the bronze medal game, where they suffered a defeat against Tappara, concluding the 2007–08 season in fourth place. Alongside Doug Shedden's departure, the club bid farewell to assistant coach Waltteri Immonen, who followed Shedden to EV Zug.

=== Glen Hanlon's appointment and team reinforcements (2008–2009) ===
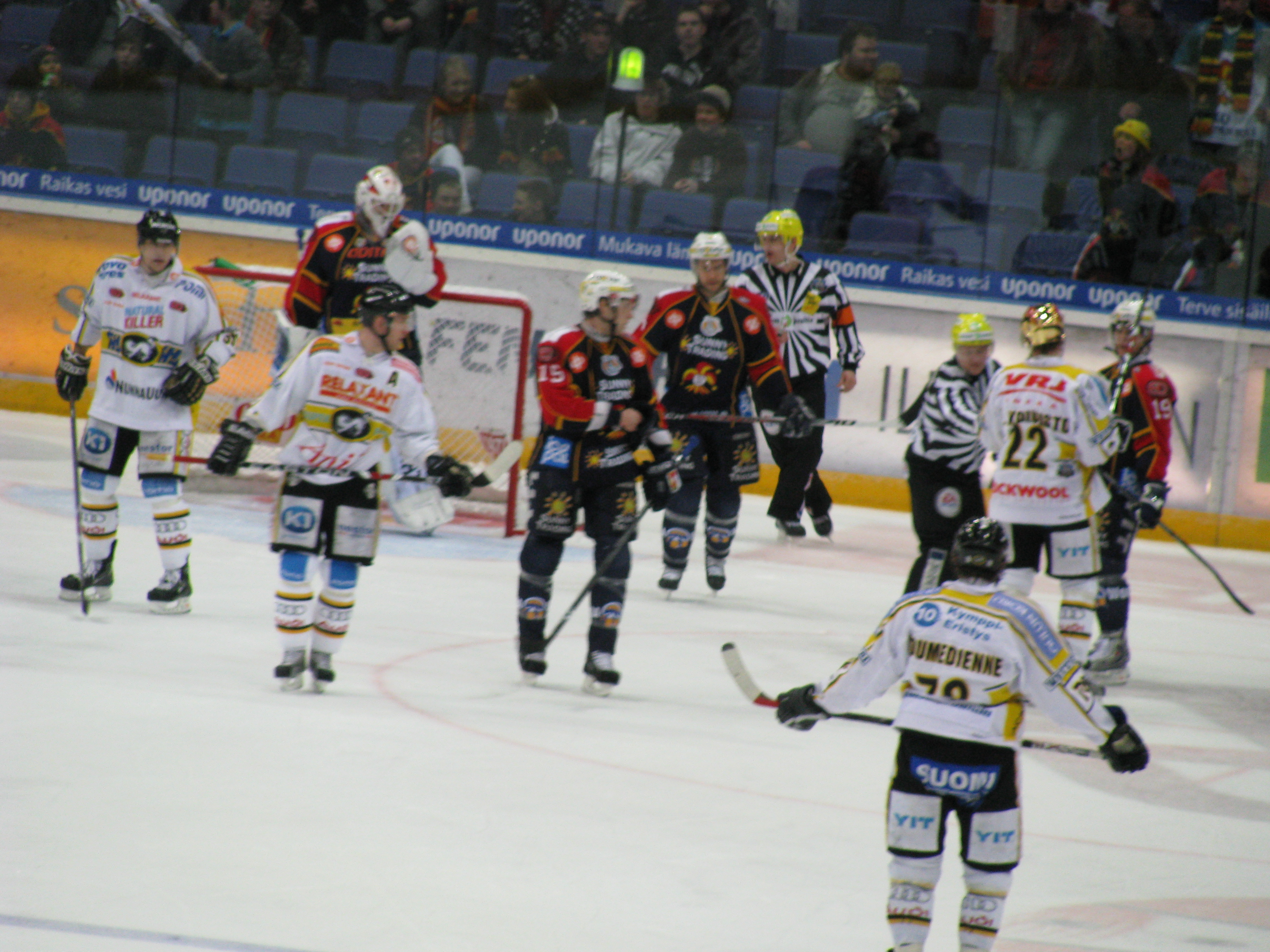
Jokerit against Kärpät in March 2009

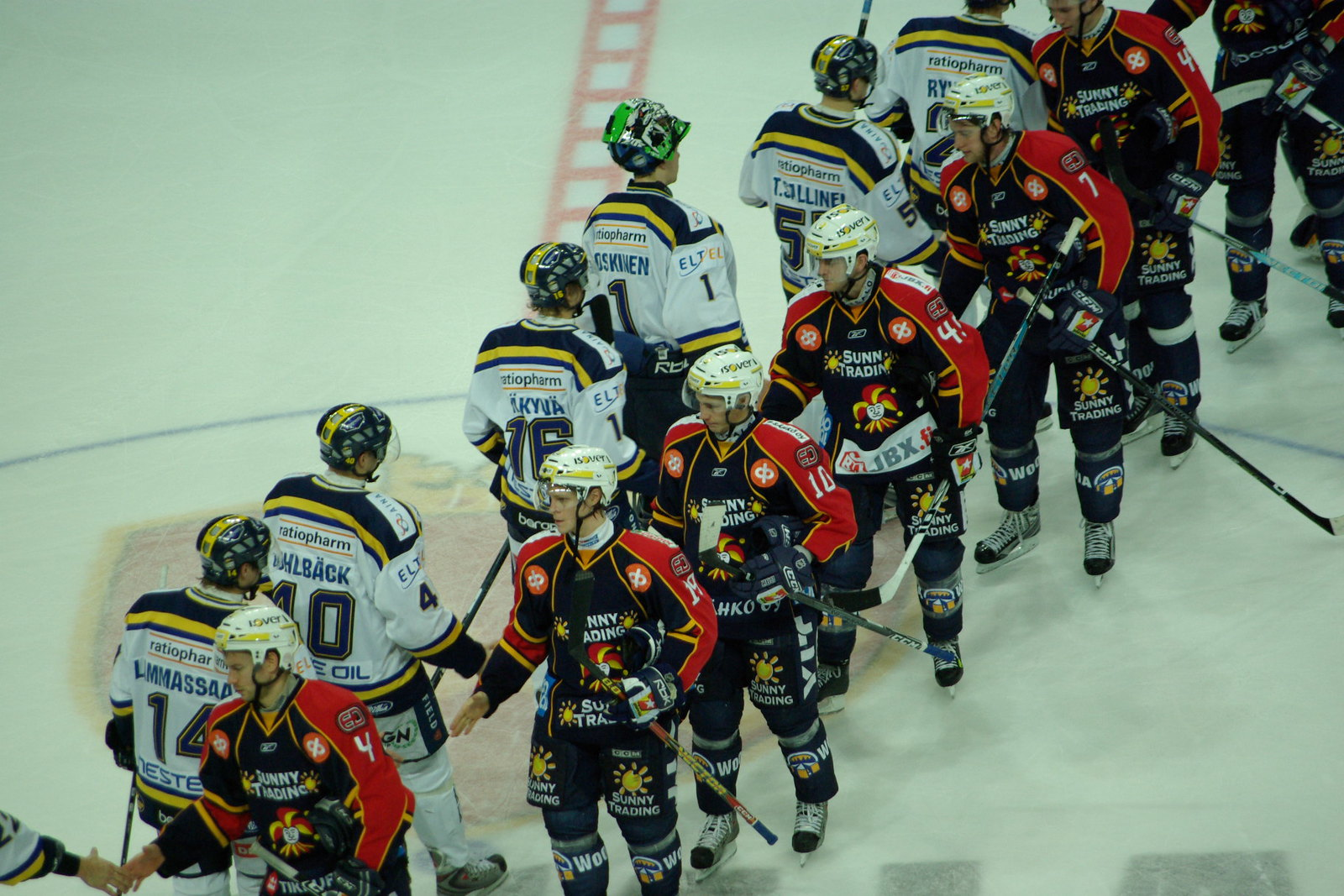
Jokerit met against Blues in November 2008.

In preparation for the 2008–09 season, Glen Hanlon, former head coach of the Belarus national team and the NHL's Washington Capitals, assumed the position of head coach for Jokerit, succeeding Doug Shedden. Despite coming off a recent appearance in the SM-liiga playoffs, Jokerit made notable signings to strengthen their roster for the upcoming season.

Among the new additions were former Jokerit and Dallas Stars player Juha Lind, along with former American Hockey League (AHL) players Janne Lahti and Tomi Mäki. Pasi Nielikäinen, known for his role as an enforcer, also joined the team. The defensive line was bolstered with the signing of former Jokerit and Frölunda HC defenseman Tom Koivisto, bringing an added offensive dimension to Jokerit's defensive play. Additionally, Antti Hulkkonen was recruited for his valuable experience on the ice.

In terms of goaltending, Juuso Riksman returned to Jokerit after a one-year stint in North America and the AHL. Riksman replaced Jussi Markkanen, who moved on to join HC CSKA Moscow in the Russian Superleague (RSL).

Alongside the changes in player personnel, Jokerit's team organization underwent some modifications after the 2007–08 season. The team's general manager at the time, Matti Virmanen, assumed a new role as the director of sports activities for Jokerit, leading to his replacement as the general manager by Keijo Säilynoja. Keijo Säilynoja, a former Jokerit-alumni and Finnish international player, took on the position of general manager for Jokerit on 15 June 2008.

As part of their preparations, Jokerit engaged in a preseason game against the NHL's Pittsburgh Penguins, but unfortunately, the team was defeated with a score of 4–1. This encounter marked the second time Jokerit faced an NHL team, the first being a game against the Toronto Maple Leafs during the 2003–04 season.

=== 2009–10 season ===
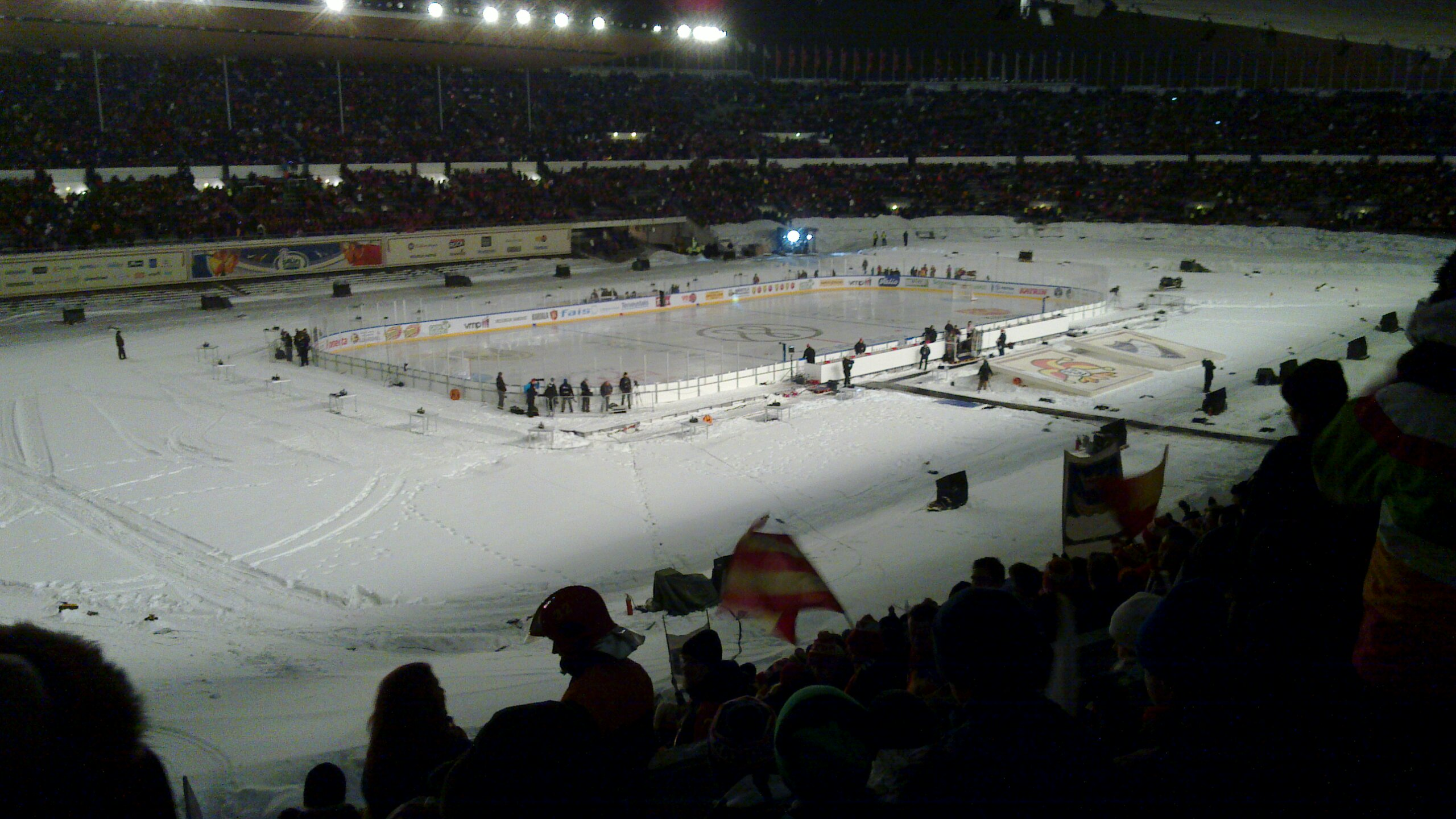
2011 Finnish Winter classic, Jokerit against HIFK in Helsinki Olympic Stadium

In the 2009–10 season, Jokerit underwent significant coaching changes. The team initially appointed Hannu Aravirta, a former Jokerit head coach from 1993 to 1996, to lead the team. However, the season started poorly, and the team found themselves at the bottom of the standings. In an effort to improve their performance, Jokerit made key player acquisitions at the start of the season, bringing in Fredrik Bremberg, Alex Brooks, Michael Nylander, and Bates Battaglia.

On 25 November, due to the team's struggles, Aravirta was dismissed from his coaching position, and Hannu Jortikka, who had previously coached the team in 2003–2005, was brought in as a replacement. Despite the coaching change, Jokerit's season remained challenging, and they barely qualified for the playoffs' wild-card round. Unfortunately, their playoff run was short-lived as they were eliminated by Tappara in a 2–1 wild card series defeat.

=== The Kekäläinen Era (2010–2012) ===
Following the 2009–2010 season, Jokerit announced the retirement of their long-serving team CEO and sports director, Matti Virmanen. Jarmo Kekäläinen, previously a deputy CEO and player scout for the NHL's St. Louis Blues, was appointed as the new CEO. Kekäläinen's responsibilities included developing the team, making player and coach selections, and improving the junior development program significantly. The contract was set for five years, and Kekäläinen aimed to elevate the team's junior operations while establishing a stable core for the roster.

The 2010–11 season began with lower-than-expected performance. Head coach Jortikka was relieved of his duties on 24 November 2010, and Erkka Westerlund, who had previously coached Jokerit from 1999 to 2001, was brought in as the new head coach. Tomi Lämsä, the coach for Lahden Pelicans' U20-juniors, replaced Sami Ranta as an assistant coach. During the season, Jokerit and HIFK played the so-called "Talviklassikko," or "Winter Classic" an outdoor match held at Helsinki Olympic Stadium in February 2011, where HIFK won 4–3. The game drew over 36,000 spectators, setting a record for attendance in European club ice hockey. Janne Lahti topped the regular-season goal-scoring chart with 37 goals, while Teemu Pulkkinen was named Rookie of the Year after breaking the rookie single-season assist record with 36 assists. Jokerit finished the regular season in sixth place but was eliminated in the quarterfinals by HIFK with a 4–3 series defeat.

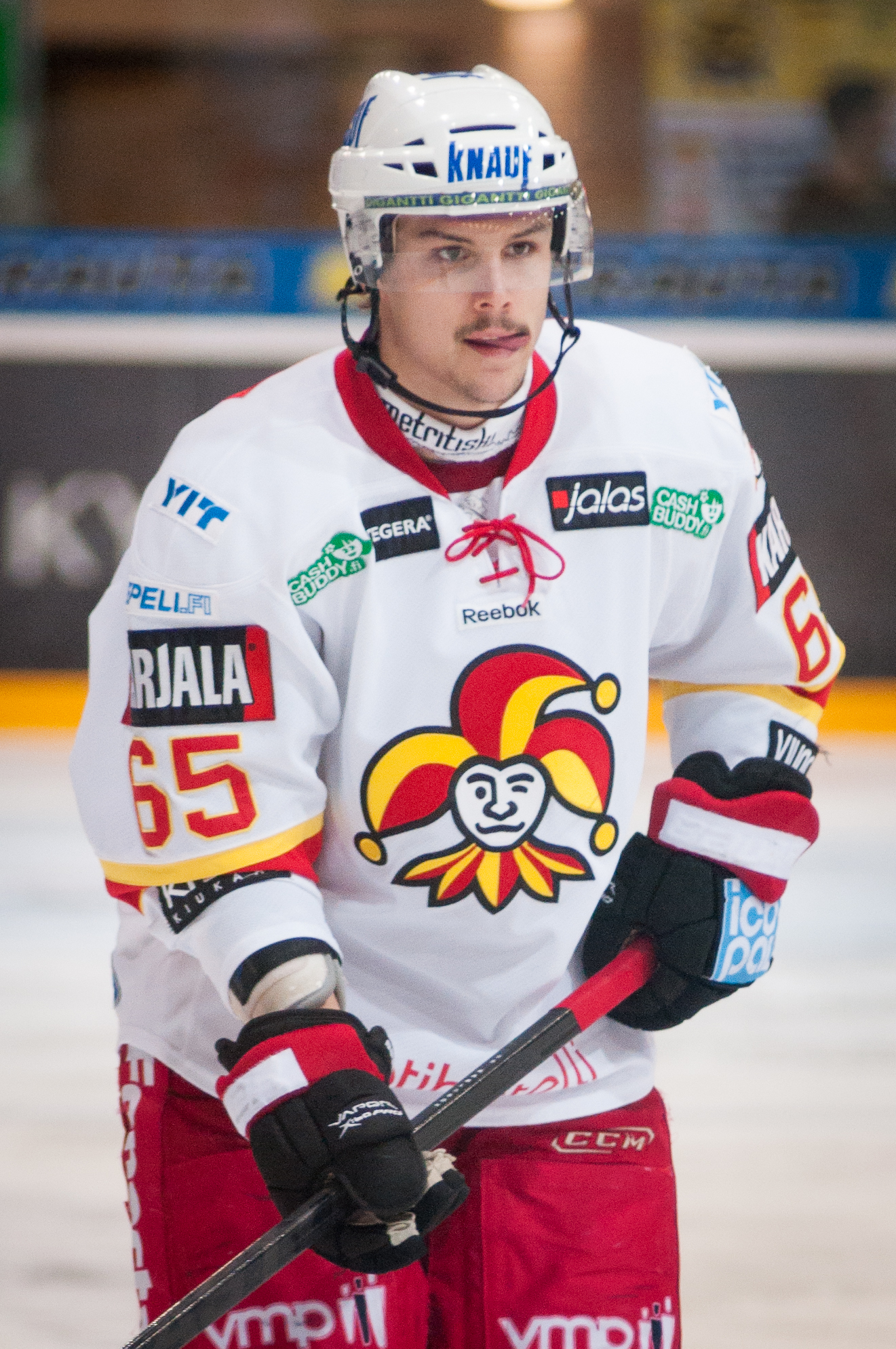
Swedish Erik Karlsson playing in Jokerit during the 2012–13 National Hockey League lockout.

Before the start of the 2011–12 season, Jokerit qualified for the European Trophy finals after the preseason games.Jokerit lost the final to Red Bull Salzburg in December. Additionally, Jokerit played a home exhibition match against Teemu Selänne's Anaheim Ducks in early October, losing 4–3 in overtime. The 2012 Talviklassikko was hosted by HIFK, and the game ended in a 2–2 tie after regular time, with HIFK winning the shootout. In the playoffs, Jokerit faced HIFK again, and this time, the team advanced with a 4–0 series victory. However, in the semi-finals, JYP proved stronger, defeating Jokerit with a 4–1 series result. Nonetheless, Jokerit secured a medal for the first time in years by defeating Blues 4–3 in overtime in the bronze medal game.

In December 2011, Jokerit announced that assistant coach Tomi Lämsä would take over as the head coach for the 2012–13 season on a two-year contract. Former Jokerit player Tomek Valtonen, who had coached the team's U20-juniors, was appointed as the new assistant coach. Due to the 2012–13 NHL lockout, Jokerit welcomed Swedish defenseman Erik Karlsson, who had been named the NHL's best defenseman, for the 2012–13 NHL season. The team also signed forward Valtteri Filppula from the NHL. Jokerit finished atop the regular-season standings, but they were eliminated in the playoffs, losing 4–2 in the quarterfinals to Rauman Lukko.

During Jarmo Kekäläinen's tenure as CEO, the club focused on developing its junior operations, resulting in the drafting of four Jokerit players in the 2012 NHL entry draft. In the 2012–13 season, Jokerit faced injury issues at the start, but instead of acquiring external players, the team relied on its young players. This was facilitated by Jokerit's collaboration with Mestis team Kiekko-Vantaa, initiated during Kekäläinen's era.

=== The final SM-liiga season (2013–2014) ===
On 28 June 2013, Hjallis Harkimo announced that he had sold Hartwall Areena to Finnish-Russian businessmen Gennady Timchenko and Arkady, Boris, and Roman Rotenberg, with an option to buy a share of Jokerit after the 2013–14 season. Harkimo himself was named the new CEO. At the same time, it was announced that Jokerit would transition to the Kontinental Hockey League (KHL) for the 2014–15 KHL season, becoming the first Finnish and Nordic team to join the league.

Although the Finnish Ice Hockey Association granted Jokerit permission for the move, the SM-Liiga stated that the club had not consulted the league according to IIHF regulations. Other SM-liiga teams claimed that Jokerit had violated the shareholders' agreement and demanded the team's suspension from the 2013–14 season. Ultimately, an agreement was reached during a SM-liiga shareholders' meeting on 30 July, allowing Jokerit to compete in the following season's SM-liiga under certain conditions. The secret terms of the agreement also allowed the club to switch to the KHL later on. Harkimo mentioned that the decision to join the KHL would likely be made in the autumn, as there was no official contract with the league at that time.

The transfer of Jokerit to the KHL for the 2014–2015 season was confirmed on 30 October. At the same time, it was announced that Arena Events had acquired 49% of Jokerit Hockey Club Oy's shares, while Harry Harkimo retained 51% ownership. On 4 December, the club named Erkka Westerlund as their head coach for the first KHL season, signing a two-year contract.

During the 2013–14 SM-Liiga season's Christmas break, Jokerit, sitting in seventh place in the regular-season standings, dismissed Tomi Lämsä and promoted Tomek Valtonen as the head coach. Former goaltender Pasi Nurminen also joined the coaching staff. Jokerit finished the regular season in seventh place, qualifying for the first round of the playoffs. However, they were defeated by HPK in a straight 0–2 series result.

The team's final placement in the league was ninth. Markus Hännikäinen scored Jokerit's last goal in the SM-liiga.

=== Transition to the KHL: successes and challenges (2014–2020) ===
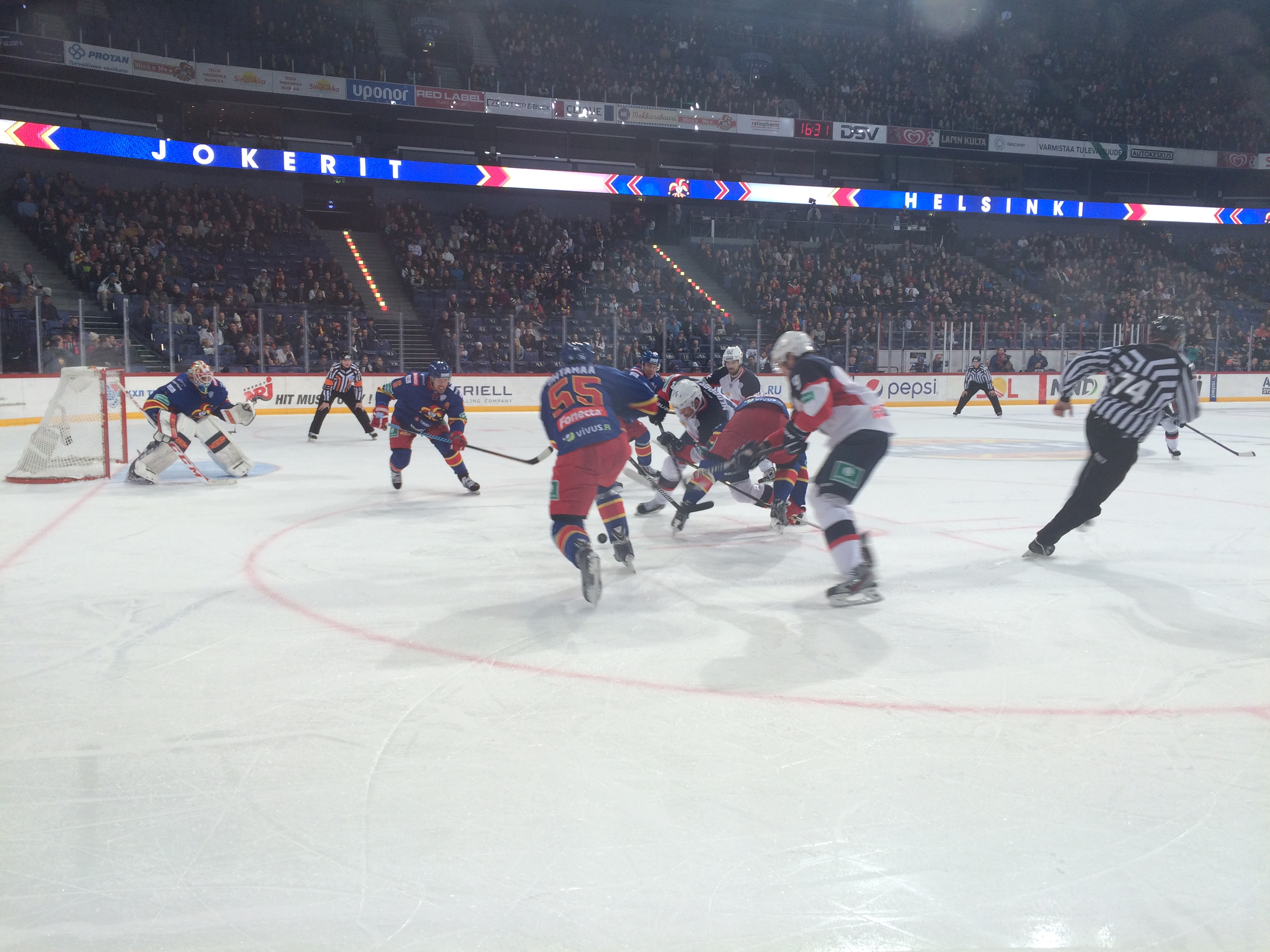
Jokerit against Slovan Bratislava in the first KHL season

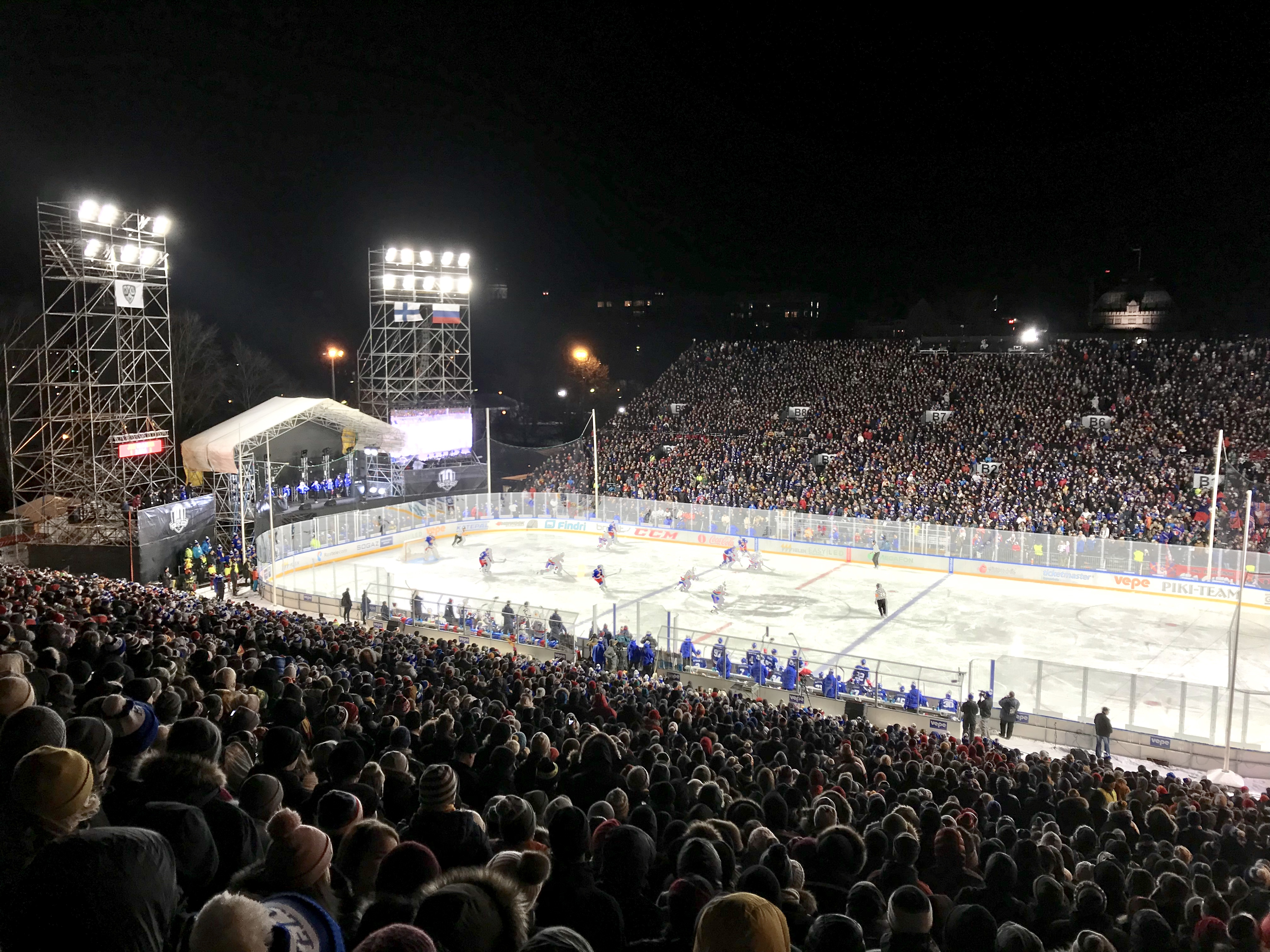
Jokerit – SKA in Helsinki Ice Challenge with KHL record attendance (17,645)

The move to the Kontinental Hockey League (KHL) marked a significant increase in Jokerit's player budget.

During their inaugural 2014–15 KHL season, Jokerit secured the sixth position among 28 teams in the league. In the regular season, they accumulated 119 points, earning them the fourth place in the Western Conference. This was a remarkable achievement, surpassing any previous record by an expansion team in the KHL. In the playoffs, Jokerit advanced by eliminating Dinamo Minsk, becoming the first expansion team in history to reach the conference semi-finals. They were eventually eliminated by CSKA Moscow in the conference finals.The team's home games attracted a total of 327,972 spectators during the regular season, setting a new record for attendance in Finland. Additionally, American forward Steve Moses set a new KHL single-season goal-scoring record with 36 goals.

The first KHL season was widely regarded as a success within the organization and the media. Besides the team's strong performance and significant fan interest, Jokerit made headlines due to various reasons, including a partnership deal with an international betting company, NordicBet, and the influence of the political situation in Russia. The club had faced challenges in paying salaries due to economic sanctions imposed as a result of the War in Ukraine that had started in February 2014, affecting Jokerit's background figures Gennady Timchenko and Arkady Rotenberg.

In the 2015–16 season, Jokerit made history by becoming the first team outside Russia to win their division in the Western Conference, finishing second overall in the conference and third overall in the league, based on points earned. Despite their regular-season success, Jokerit was eliminated in the conference quarterfinals by Torpedo Nizhny Novgorod with a 2–4 series loss in the playoffs.

For the 2016–17 season, Jukka Jalonen became the new head coach. However, the team once again faced a playoff exit in the conference quarterfinals, being defeated 0–4 by the regular-season champion, CSKA Moscow.

In March 2017, Jokerit announced their commitment to continue playing in the KHL for at least the next five years.

The 2017–18 season marked the club's 50th anniversary celebration. The team set a new club record at the beginning of the season by winning 16 consecutive games. In the playoffs, Jokerit advanced to the conference semi-finals by defeating HC Sochi 4–1 in the quarterfinals but were eliminated by CSKA Moscow in a closely contested series with a 2–4 loss. Nonetheless, the team's fifth-place finish in the KHL and third-place finish in the Western Conference were their best achievements during their KHL era. The season also featured a historic outdoor game against SKA St. Petersburg held at Kaisaniemi Park in Helsinki on 2 December 2017. The game attracted a record attendance of 17,645 spectators, becoming the largest crowd ever in a KHL game.

In preparation for the 2018–19 season, Jokerit appointed Lauri Marjamäki as head coach on a four-year contract. The opening game of the season made Finnish sports history as Jokerit featured more foreign players than Finnish players on their roster, a significant milestone for the club. However, the team once again faced elimination in the conference quarterfinals, this time against Dynamo Moscow, losing the series 2–4.

During the 2019–20 season, Jokerit advanced to the conference semi-finals by defeating Lokomotiv Yaroslavl with a 4–2 series win in the first round of the playoffs. Unfortunately, due to the COVID-19 pandemic, Jokerit withdrew from the playoffs before facing SKA St. Petersburg in the conference semi-finals. The team had already announced that the series would be played without spectators in Helsinki due to restrictions in Finland that prevented events with more than 500 people.

In February 2020, Jokerit declared that their previous five-year agreement to play in the KHL was now an open-ended arrangement.

=== End of the KHL era (2021–2022) ===
The 2020–21 season was set to begin with Jokerit playing against Dinamo Minsk in Belarus, which raised widespread criticism due to the political situation in the country. Belarus had been facing significant protests following disputed presidential elections. However, the departure to Belarus was canceled at the last moment, with the team's plane waiting on the runway.

In the 2021 playoffs, Jokerit once again confronted Lokomotiv Yaroslavl but suffered a 4–0 series defeat. All the playoff games took place in Russia due to the COVID-19 restrictions in Finland, which had forced Jokerit to play the home matches without spectators since November 2020.

Following the Russian invasion of Ukraine, Jokerit made an announcement on 25 February 2022, declaring their withdrawal from the 2021–22 season before the start of the playoffs. Jokerit was scheduled to face Moscow Spartak in the first round of the playoffs.

In the aftermath of the invasion, numerous sponsors severed ties with the club's parent company. The Jokerit Supporters' Association, Eteläpääty ry, demanded the team's withdrawal from the KHL. Additionally, the team's Russian-owned home arena, Hartwall Arena, faced sanctions, and its marketing partner, Hartwall, terminated its contract with the arena company.

Lauri Marjamäki assumed the head coaching position at Oulun Kärpät for the remainder of the season, while several players transferred to other teams. The long-standing partnership with the Mestis team Kiekko-Vantaa also ended that spring.

On 5 April 2022, Jokerit made an announcement of the decision to completely withdraw from the Kontinental Hockey League (KHL).

Over the course of its seven full KHL seasons, Jokerit advanced to the second round of the playoffs three times and the first round four times.

=== Return to Finland (2022–2023) ===
In April 2022, the club revealed its intention to make a comeback to the Finnish Liiga for the 2023–24 Liiga season. According to the announcement, the privately held representation team would not participate in any leagues during the 2022–2023 season, but the junior teams under the association would continue their operations as usual. Before the return would be possible, Liiga demanded Jokerit to sever all financial and ownership ties related to the previous KHL team.

Initially, the return to the Finnish leagues was being orchestrated by a new background company named Team Jokerit Oy and led by the son of Harry "Hjallis" Harkimo, Joel Harkimo.

However, on 1 September, Liiga stated that it would not accept any license applications from outside the league for the 2023–24 season. Heikki Hiltunen, the chairman of the Liiga board, explained that the league had not received any concrete information from Jokerit regarding the application for a Liiga license. Additionally, Harkimo's previous involvement with the club's KHL team posed an obstacle to the club's return to the Liiga.

In February 2023, Joel Harkimo withdrew and pulled Team Jokerit Oy from the project. A few days later a new ownership group under Jokerit Helsinki Oy, led by Mikko Saarni and including such former Jokerit names as Ossi Väänänen, Teuvo Teräväinen and Esa Lindell, stepped in to continue with the project. On 31 March, Jokerit Helsinki Oy left the license application to Mestis. On 3 May, the Finnish Ice Hockey Association granted Jokerit a license to compete in Mestis for the 2023–2024 season.

=== Return to Finnish leagues (2023–present) ===
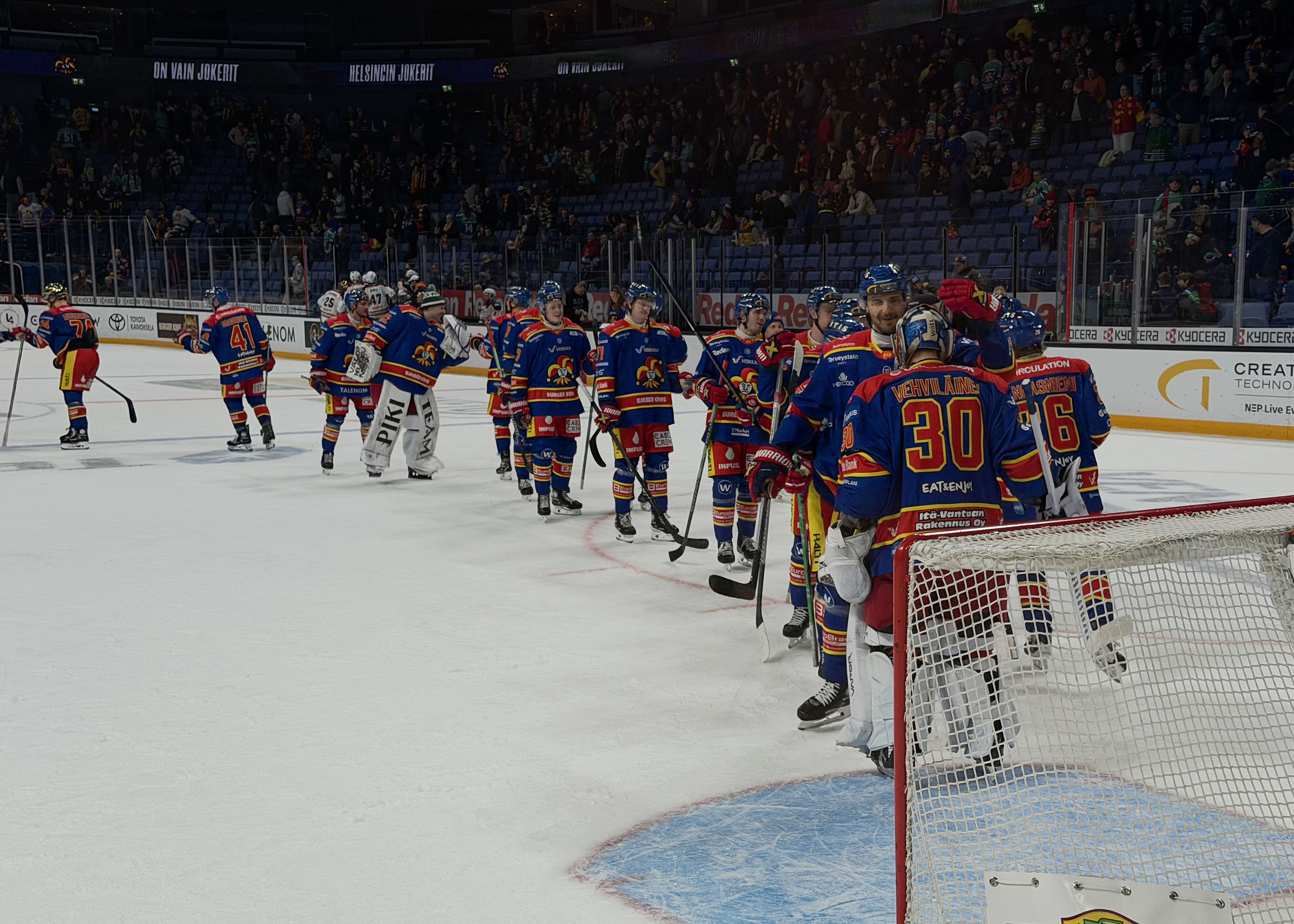
Jokerit players celebrating after a 6–2 playoff win over Kiekko-Vantaa

In August 2023, Jokerit played their first game since 11 January 2022, in the Pitsiturnaus tournament. Jokerit faced Porin Ässät and lost the game 4–1. One week prior to the start of the 2023–24 season, Jokerit unveiled their leadership lineup. Saku Forsblom was appointed as the new captain, with Otto Karvinen, Emil Oksanen, Erkka Seppälä, and Onni Lind assuming the roles of assistant captains. On 21 September, Jokerit played their first official league game in Finland since 16 March 2014. The game was an away game against Kiekko-Espoo and Jokerit won 3–2 in overtime with a goal from Leevi Lemberg.

On 6 October, Jokerit broke the one-game attendance record for Mestis in a game against Kiekko-Vantaa with 8,200 spectators (the previous record was 6,982). Jokerit won the game 3–2. Jokerit finished their first season in third place of the regular season but were ultimately defeated 2–4 by Kokkolan Hermes in the semi-finals.

Before the 2024–25 Mestis season, the Jokerit organization underwent several changes. Antti-Jussi Niemi announced his decision to step down as general manager. Additionally, the club welcomed back former Jokerit player Valtteri Filppula, a member of the prestigious "Triple Gold Club," who joined as a player-owner. Jokerit also made significant changes to their coaching staff, appointing Risto Dufva as the new head coach to replace Tero Määttä, who continued as an assistant coach. After the start of the season Jokerit also welcomed back two of their former stars Juhamatti Aaltonen and Antti Pihlström. Jokerit beat Iisalmen Peli-Karhut in the 2025 Mestis finals to become the Mestis champion.

== Current team ==
=== Roster ===
Updated 22 September 2024

No.	Nat	Player	Pos	S/G	Age	Acquired	Birthplace
35	(Finland)	Henri Risikko	G	L	24	2023	Helsinki, Finland
37	(Finland)	Sisu Heikkeri	G	L	22	2024	Helsinki, Finland
6	(Finland)	Jimi Jalonen	D	R	30	2023	Rauma, Finland
11	(Finland)	Valtteri Jeskanen	D	L	26	2023	Hyvinkää, Finland
12	(Latvia)	Niks Fenenko	D	L	22	2024	Riga, Latvia
26	(Finland)	Santeri Salmela	D	L	26	2024	Lappeenranta, Finland
28	(Finland)	Rony Ahonen	D	L	39	2024	Porvoo, Finland
47	(Finland)	Saku Forsblom (A)	D	L	28	2023	Mikkeli, Finland
52	(Finland)	Riku Tuomola	D	L	23	2024	Forssa, Finland
56	(Finland)	Tuomas Nissinen	D	R	22	2023	Kerava, Finland
71	(Finland)	Hugo Rikkilä	D	L	25	2024	Espoo, Finland
77	(Finland)	Santeri Haakana	D	L	23	2023	Helsinki, Finland
89	(Finland)	Robin Laukkanen	D	L	25	2024	Helsinki, Finland
9	(Finland)	Samuel Salonen	F	L	26	2024	Vantaa, Finland
10	(Finland)	Jaakko Heikkinen	F	L	29	2024	Helsinki, Finland
13	(Finland)	Lauri Saastamoinen	F	L	22	2024	Helsinki, Finland
14	(Finland)	Jesse Liuksiala	F	L	27	2024	Järvenpää, Finland
16	(Finland)	Teemu Henritius	F	L	33	2023	Helsinki, Finland
19	(Finland)	Oskari Kalajanniska	F	L	27	2023	Haapajärvi, Finland
20	(Finland)	Rasmus Lahnaviik	F	R	25	2024	Vantaa, Finland
21	(Finland)	Otto Karvinen (A)	F	L	36	2023	Vantaa, Finland
22	(Finland)	Alexander Forslund	F	L	25	2023	Kirkkonummi, Finland
25	(Finland)	Emil Kuusla	F	L	21	2023	Helsinki, Finland
27	(Finland)	Onni Lind	F	L	21	2023	Helsinki, Finland
28	(Finland)	Aatu Wulff	F	L	22	2024	Helsinki, Finland
40	(Finland)	Juho Keinänen	F	L	20	2023	Helsinki, Finland
41	(Finland)	Antti Pihlström	F	L	42	2024	Vantaa, Finland
50	(Finland)	Juhamatti Aaltonen	F	R	41	2024	Ii, Finland
51	(Finland)	Valtteri Filppula (C)	F	L	42	2024	Helsinki, Finland
61	(Finland)	Leevi Lemberg	F	R	27	2023	Vantaa, Finland
72	(Finland)	Arttu Lausniemi	F	L	25	2024	Sastamala, Finland
80	(Finland)	Ville Vainikainen (A)	F	L	32	2024	Kuopio, Finland

=== Coaches and team management ===
- Head Coach: Juuso Hahl
- Assistant Coach: Janne Grönvall
- Assistant Coach: TBA
- Goaltending Coach: Samuli Nordman
- Osteopath: Jarno Hyytiäinen
- Photographer: Mikko Taipale
- Press officer: Iiro Keurulainen
- Sports Director: Olli-Pekka Yrjänheikki

=== Office ===
- general manager: TBA
- Administration: Laura Pussila
- Communication: Iiro Keurulainen
- Contact and partnership manager: Jukka Räisänen

== Logo and jerseys ==
Jokerit originally had a logo designed by artist Jorma Hinkka, based on various joker cards. As compensation Hinkka received free tickets to Jokerit games but he never used them as he was not interested in ice hockey.

A new logo with Canadian-style speed lines was introduced in 1983 but Jokerit later reverted to the original in 1988. Notably, Nike designed a logo that was in use from 1998 to 2000. In 1997, The Hockey News ranked Jokerit's logo as the world's best among team insignias.

The logo of Jokerit in 1983–1988.

The "Nike" logo of Jokerit in 1998–2000.

The logo of Jokerit in 2019–2022.

The original logo of Jokerit in 1967–1983, 1988–1998, 2000–2019 and 2022 ->

The team's jerseys evolved over time. They began with blue and white, switched to red in 1973, and then back to blue in 1981. Different color combinations were used, including green and blue, and green and white, followed by green and purple. Eventually, the team returned to the original blue and white in 1997–98. In recent years, Jokerit shifted to yellow and black jerseys in 2019–2020, aiming to highlight the traditional logo and team colors. In 2023–2024 season all home games played in the Helsinki Ice Hall, Jokerit will play in green and purple retro jerseys and silver helmets.

== Home arena ==
Jokerit had its home games at the Helsinki Ice Hall from 1967 until 1997. In 1995, Hjallis Harkimo initiated the construction of a new arena for Jokerit, which was completed in 1997. Subsequently, Jokerit began its 1997–98 SM-Liiga season at the newly built venue, known as Hartwall areena (later Hartwall Arena). Jokerit have used Bill Conti's "Gonna Fly Now" as their goal song since the early 1980s.

The Hartwall Arena served as the home for Jokerit from 1997 until 2022. In 2014, when Jokerit transitioned to the Kontinental Hockey League (KHL), Hjallis Harkimo sold the arena to Arena Events, a company owned by Gennady Timchenko and Arkady and Boris Rotenbergs.

In March 2022, after the Russian invasion of Ukraine and the subsequent sanctions imposed on Gennady Timchenko, and Arkady and Boris Rotenberg, Hartwall, the former naming rights holder, made an official announcement regarding the termination of its naming rights contracts. As a result, Hartwall Arena was renamed Helsinki Halli. Due to the impact of the imposed sanctions, beyond the loss of its original name, the arena faced financial difficulties, and any further use of the venue became impossible during this period.

In the 2023–24 Mestis season, Jokerit played their home games in two venues. Thirteen games were played at the Kerava ice rink, while for the remaining eleven games of the regular season and all playoff games, Jokerit played in the Helsinki Ice Hall.

For the 2024–25 season Jokerit returns fully to the Helsinki Ice Hall and will play all home games there.

With Helsinki Halli reopening in October 2025, Jokerit returned to the arena for the first time since 2022, now renamed to Veikkaus Arena. The "homecoming" match was played on 24 October 2025 against Joensuun Kiekko-Pojat, Jokerit won the match 7–4. Despite competing in Finland's second tier (Mestis), Jokerit have set both a new Mestis attendance record and the highest crowd of this hockey season in Finland (12,114).

Since Jokerit were granted a Liiga license for the 2026–27 season, Jokerit announced that they will move permanently back to the Veikkaus Arena. They played their final home game at the Helsinki Ice Hall on 17 February 2026 against Kiekko-Vantaa, as Jokerit played their final home game of the regular season and all home games of the 2026 Mestis playoffs at Veikkaus Arena.

Jokerit defeated Ketterä in the final with a straight-game win of 4–0. Over a thousand fans traveled to Lappeenranta for the final match. At the same time, the match was farewell match on the Jokerit Mestis journey.

== Supporters ==
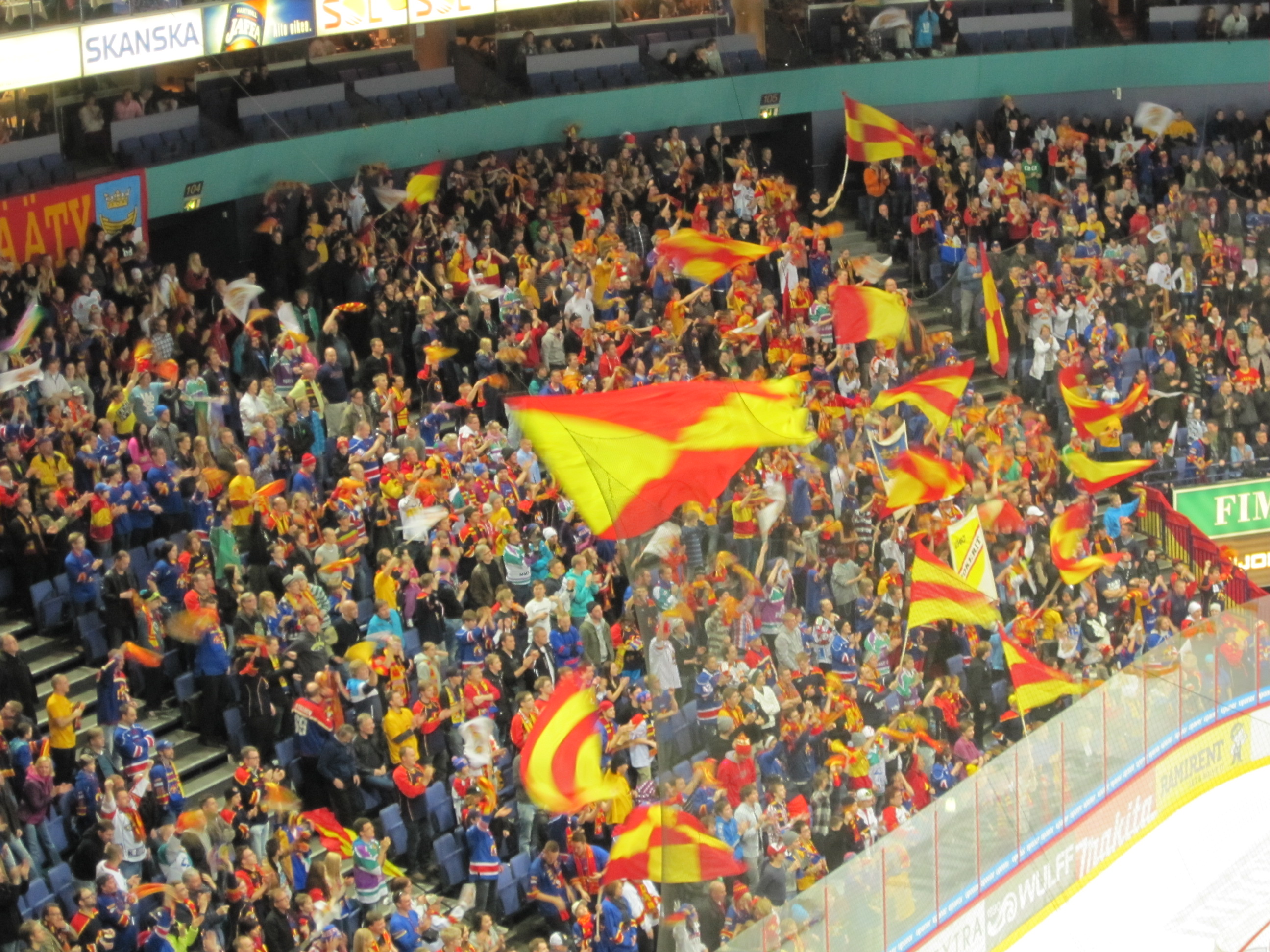
Jokerit supporters' stand "Eteläpääty" in the SM-Liiga semi-final match Jokerit-JYP on 9 April 2012.

Jokerit has a fanbase supported by three notable supporters organizations: The Jokerit Fan Club, Old Chiefs, and Eteläpääty.

Established in the 1970s and officially registered as an association in 1989, the Jokerit Fan Club has been a long-standing pillar of support for the club. It played a significant role in uniting fans during the successful 1990s era. After a long period of reduced activity, the Fan Club resumed its operations in 2019.

Formed in 2008, the Old Chiefs fan group is dedicated to supporters who have been following the club for years, even decades. The group serves as a gathering point for fans who may not actively participate in Eteläpääty lit. '"South Side"'.

Jokerit supporters have extended their enthusiasm to other sports as well. In 2012, they founded the phoenix football club Jokerit FC, carrying on the legacy of FC Jokerit, and which currently competes in lower leagues. Additionally, in 2008, the fans established the floorball club Jokerit Salibandy, further showcasing their dedication and involvement in various sporting endeavors.

== Ownership ==
The management and ownership of the hockey team are overseen by Jokerit Helsinki Oy. The ownership structure of the company is distributed as follows:

Class A shares are held by notable individuals within the organization, including Viima Hockey founder and owner Mikko Saarni, who serves as the chairman of the board, along with former Jokerit players Ossi Väänänen, Teuvo Teräväinen, Esa Lindell, movie producer Markus Selin, Timo Mäkelä, writer and movie director Max Seeck, and Helsingin Jokerit Ry, which is the junior organization vested with the rights to the team's name and logo.

Class B shares are fully owned (100%) by Jokerikannattajat Oy (translated as "Supporters of Jokerit" in English), an entity owned by supporters of the team. Holding Class B shares entitles the supporters to a board seat within the club's governance structure, as well as a 3% share of any player transfers to the NHL.

== Honours and statistics ==
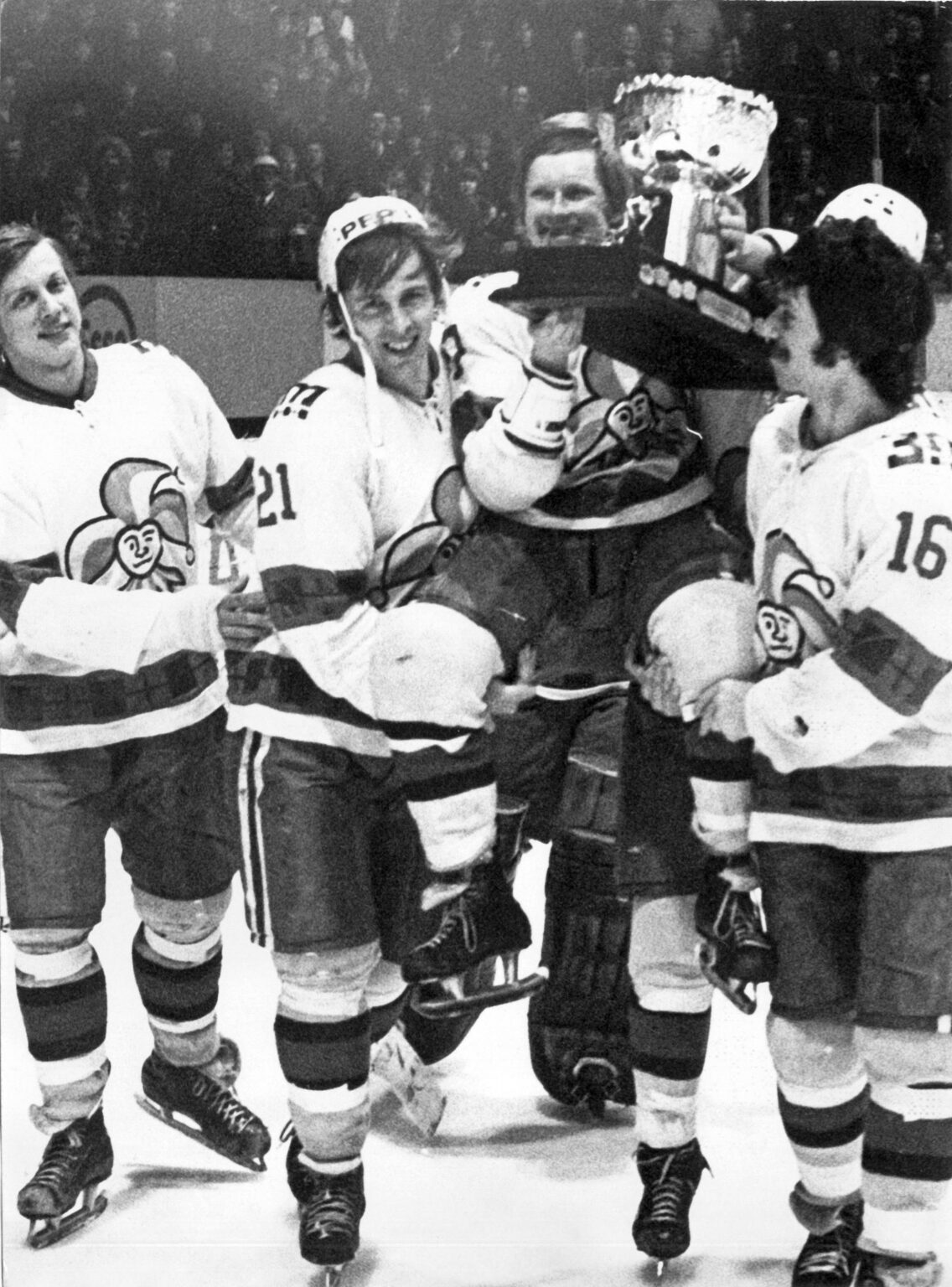
Jokerit with Kanada-malja in 1973

=== Team awards ===
==== Domestic ====
- (gold) SM-sarja Kanada-malja: 1973
- (gold) SM-liiga Kanada-malja: 1992, 1994, 1996, 1997, 2002
- (silver) SM-sarja Kanada-malja: 1971
- (silver) SM-liiga Kanada-malja: 1983, 1995, 2000, 2005, 2007
- (bronze) SM-liiga Kanada-malja: 1998, 2012
- (gold) Mestis (second level of ice hockey in Finland): 2025, 2026

==== International ====
- IIHF European Cup: 1994, 1995
- (bronze) IIHF European Cup: 1992
- IIHF Continental Cup: 2003
- (silver) European Trophy (1): 2011
- Tournament Hameenlinna: 2014
- Puchkov Cup: 2014, 2016
- (silver) Puchkov Cup: 2017
- (bronze) Puchkov Cup: 2015
- Bauer games: 2020, 2021
- Warrior Cup Kaufbeuren: 2024

==== Other awards ====
- Aaro Kivilinnan Memorial Trophy (Best Finnish Club age classes combined): 1976, 1996, 1997 (shared), 1998, 1999, 2000, 2003
- Harry Lindblad Trophy (SM-liiga regular season winner, since 1975): 1983, 1995, 1996, 1997, 2001, 2013
- I-Divisioona / Suomensarja, promotion to top league. (it was the second level of ice hockey in Finland): 1969, 1989

=== Individual awards ===
Kultainen kypärä

- Teemu Selänne – 1991
- Tim Thomas – 2005
- Ville Leino – 2008
- Juuso Riksman – 2009

Urpo Ylönen trophy

- Rauli Sohlman – 1983
- Ari Sulander – 1996
- Kari Lehtonen – 2002, 2003
- Juuso Riksman – 2009

Pekka Rautakallio trophy

- Nikolai Makarov – 1983
- Erik Hämäläinen – 1993
- Mika Strömberg – 1996

Jarmo Wasama memorial trophy

- Teemu Pulkkinen – 2011
- Teuvo Teräväinen – 2012

Veli-Pekka Ketola trophy

- Timo Turunen – 1973
- Timo Sutinen – 1974, 1975
- Petri Varis – 1997, 2001

Aarne Honkavaara trophy

- Timo Turunen – 1973, 1974 (shared)
- Teemu Selänne – 1992
- Petri Varis – 1997
- Pasi Saarela – 1999
- Jani Rita – 2007
- Jukka Hentunen – 2010 (shared)

Raimo Kilpiö trophy

- Jari Kapanen – 1975
- Teemu Selänne – 1991
- Keijo Säilynoja – 1992
- Waltteri Immonen – 1996
- Ville Peltonen – 2003

Matti Keinonen trophy

- Arto Sirviö – 1984
- Waltteri Immonen – 1992
- Erik Hämäläinen – 1993
- Petri Varis – 1996
- Martti Järventie – 2007

Kalevi Numminen trophy

- Reino Ruotsalainen – 1983
- Raimo Summanen – 2002

Other achievements:

- In the 2004–05 season, Tim Thomas broke the SM-liiga shutout record with 15 shutouts during the regular season.
- Nine European players in the history of the National Hockey League have scored 1,000 career points; two of these nine, and the only Finns, Jari Kurri and Teemu Selänne, started their professional careers with Jokerit.
- In the 2015–16 KHL season, Jokerit won the Bobrov Division in just their second season in the league.

=== Retired numbers ===
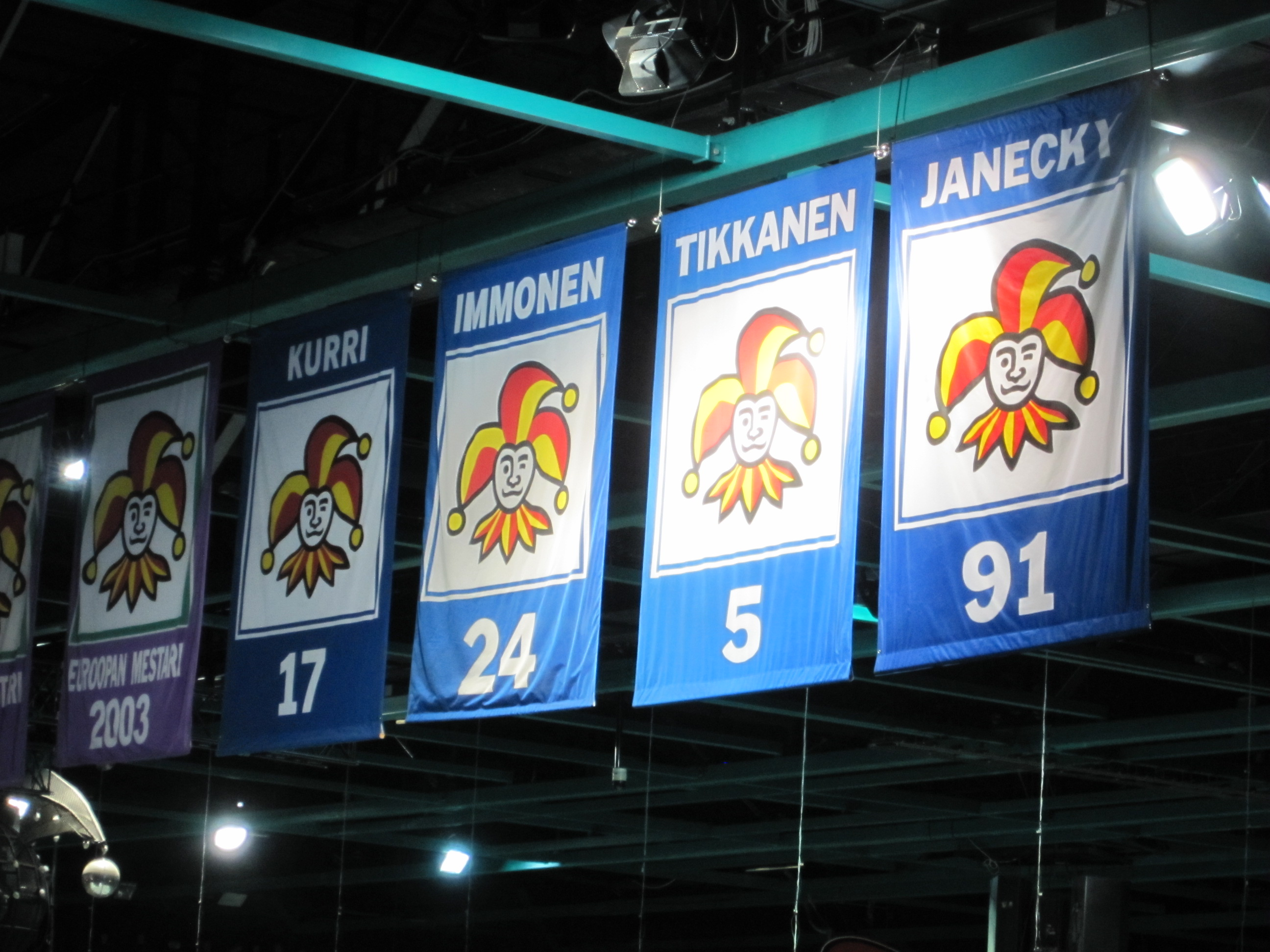
Retired numbers of Jokerit

Jokerit retired numbers
No.	Player	Position	Career	No. retirement
5	Esa Tikkanen	LW	1999–2000	13 September 2001
15	Henry Leppä	F	1972–1976, 1977–1981 (player); 1987–1988 (head coach)	5 March 2014
17	Jari Kurri	RW	1977–1980, 1994–1995	27 October 2007
17	Timo Turunen	C	1967–1968, 1969–1974, 1975–1976 (player); 1977–1978 (head coach)	5 March 2014
23	Petri Varis	LW	1993–1997, 1999–2002, 2004–2007	13 December 2013
24	Waltteri Immonen	D	1987–1999	31 August 1999
51	Valtteri Filppula	C	2003–2005, 2012–2013, 2024–2025	10 January 2026
91	Otakar Janecký	C	1991–1999	7 November 2004

=== All-time captains ===
- Osmo Kuusisto – 1967–1969
- Erkki Mononen – 1969–1971
- Timo Turunen – 1971–1976, 1978
- Pentti Hiiros – 1976–1978
- Jari Kapanen – 1978–1980
- Henry Leppä – 1980–1981
- Jussi Lepistö – 1981–1982, 1987
- Risto Kerminen – 1982–1984
- Markus Lehto – 1984–1985
- Jari Lindroos – 1985–1987
- Jarmo Koskinen – 1987–1989
- Anssi Melametsä – 1989–1990
- Waltteri Immonen – 1991–1999
- Antti-Jussi Niemi – 1999–2000, 2009–2010
- Antti Törmänen – 2000–2002
- Ville Peltonen – 2001–2002, 2002–2003
- Sami Helenius – 2003–2004
- Juha Lind – 2004–2005
- Petri Varis – 2005, 2006–2009
- Marko Jantunen – 2005–2006
- Ossi Väänänen – 2010–2014
- Niko Kapanen – 2014–2016
- Peter Regin – 2016–2020
- Marko Anttila – 2020–2022
- Saku Forsblom – 2023–2024
- Valtteri Filppula – 2024–2025
- Saku Forsblom – 2025–2026
- Markus Hännikäinen – 2026–

=== All-time head coaches ===
- (Finland) Jorma Salmi 1967–1968
- (Finland) Martti Sarlin 1968–1969 (half season)
- (Finland) Jorma Kyntölä 1968–1969 (half season)
- (Finland) Aulis Hirvonen 1969–1970
- (Finland) Matti Lampainen 1970–1973, 1973–1974
- (Finland) Rauli Virtanen 1973
- (Soviet Union) / (Russia) Boris Majorov 1974–1976, 1990–1993
- (Finland) Jorma Borgström 1976–1977
- (Finland) Pentti Katainen 1977–1978
- (Finland) Timo Turunen 1978
- (Finland) Matti Väisänen 1978–1980, 1985–1987
- (Finland) Olli Hietanen 1980–1982
- (Finland) Reino Ruotsalainen 1982–1985
- (Finland) Henry Leppä 1987–1988
- (Finland) Kari Mäkinen 1988–1990
- (Finland) Alpo Suhonen 1993
- (Finland) Hannu Aravirta 1993–1996
- (Sweden) Curt Lundmark 1996–1997, 1997–1998
- (Finland) Sakari Pietilä 1997
- (Finland) Hannu Kapanen 1998–1999
- (Finland) Timo Lahtinen 1999
- (Finland) Erkka Westerlund 1999–2001, 2010–2012, 2014–2016
- (Finland) Raimo Summanen 2001–2003
- (Finland) Hannu Jortikka 2003–2005, 2009–2010
- (Finland) Waltteri Immonen 2005
- (Sweden) Curt Lindström 2005–2006
- (Canada) Doug Shedden 2006–2008
- (Canada) Glen Hanlon 2008–2009
- (Finland) Hannu Aravirta 2009
- (Finland) Tomi Lämsä 2012–2014 (half a season)
- (Poland) / (Finland) Tomek Valtonen 2014 (half a season)
- (Finland) Jukka Jalonen 2016–2018
- (Finland) Lauri Marjamäki 2018–2022
- (Finland) Tero Määttä 2023–2024
- (Finland) Risto Dufva 2024–2025
- (Finland) Tomek Valtonen 2025–2025
- (Finland) Juuso Hahl 2026–

=== Season-by-season record ===
NOTE: Overtime rules have changed in professional hockey, as seen in this chart. RW= Regulation Win, D=Draw, OTW = Overtime or Shootout Win, OTL = Overtime or Shootout loss.

From	To	RW	D	OTW	OTL
1967–68	2000–01	2	1	2	0
2001–02	2002–03	2	1	2	1
2004–05	Present	3	N/A	2	1

Note: GP = Games played, W = Wins, OTW = Overtime or shootout wins, T = Ties, OTL = Overtime or shootout losses, L = Losses, Pts = Points, GF = Goals for, GA = Goals against, PIM = Penalties in minutes

Season	League	GP	W	OTW	T	OTL	L	Pts	GF	GA	PIM	Finish	Postseason
1967–68	Suomensarja	12	7	—	1	—	4	15	76	54	—	2nd	No relegation playoffs arranged
1968–69	Suomensarja	14	11	—	2	—	1	24	95	35	—	1st	No relegation playoffs arranged. Promoted as the regular season winner
1969–70	SM-sarja	22	13	—	2	—	7	28	125	78	—	5th	No playoffs arranged
1970–71	SM-sarja	32	20	—	3	—	9	43	145	97	—	2nd	No playoffs arranged
1971–72	SM-sarja	32	18	—	3	—	11	39	132	111	—	4th	No playoffs arranged
1972–73	SM-sarja	36	29	—	3	—	4	61	193	86	—	1st	No playoffs arranged. Crowned champion as the regular season winner
1973–74	SM-sarja	36	20	—	5	—	11	45	192	116	—	4th	No playoffs arranged
1974–75	SM-sarja	36	18	—	4	—	14	40	174	128	—	4th	No playoffs arranged
1975–76	Sm-liiga	36	17	—	2	—	17	36	169	156	—	6th	Did not qualify
1976–77	SM-liiga	36	14	—	5	—	17	33	137	153	—	7th	Did not qualify
1977–78	SM-liiga	36	7	—	3	—	26	17	125	177	—	10th	Stayed in the league through relegation playoffs
1978–79	SM-liiga	36	14	—	3	—	19	31	137	181	—	8th	Did not qualify
1979–80	SM-liiga	36	11	—	4	—	21	26	151	199	—	9th	Stayed in the league through relegation playoffs
1980–81	SM-liiga	36	6	—	3	—	27	15	114	188	—	9th	Stayed in the league through relegation playoffs
1981–82	SM-liiga	36	9	—	2	—	25	20	121	178	—	9th	Stayed in the league through relegation playoffs
1982–83	SM-liiga	36	27	—	1	—	8	55	193	119	—	1st	Lost final series (Kanada-malja) 2–3 (HIFK)
1983–84	SM-liiga	37	17	—	3	—	17	37	191	162	—	7th	Did not qualify
1984–85	SM-liiga	36	13	—	2	—	21	28	154	176	—	8th	Did not qualify
1985–86	SM-liiga	36	10	—	2	—	24	22	131	181	—	9th	Did not qualify
1986–87	SM-liiga	44	12	—	3	—	29	27	161	226	—	10th	Was relegated directly to I-Divisioona
1987–89	I-Div.	44	20	—	6	—	18	46	193	182	—	7th	Did not qualify
1988–90	I-Div.	44	30	—	4	—	10	64	278	173	—	2nd	Won relegation playoffs and was promoted to Sm-liiga
1989–90	SM-liiga	44	15	—	3	—	26	33	165	183	—	10th	Did not qualify
1990–91	SM-liiga	44	17	—	6	—	21	40	150	162	—	9th	Did not qualify
1991–92	SM-liiga	44	28	—	3	—	13	59	195	132	—	2nd	Win final series (Kanada-malja), 4–1 (JyP HT)
1992–93	SM-liiga	54	28	—	7	—	13	63	185	133	—	2nd	Lost in 1st round, 0–3 (Ässät)
1993–94	SM-liiga	48	26	—	4	—	18	56	181	131	—	3rd	Win final series (Kanada-malja), 3–1 (TPS)
1994–95	SM-liiga	50	34	—	6	—	10	74	202	122	—	1st	Loss final series (silver medal), 2–3 (TPS)
1995–96	SM-liiga	50	31	—	11	—	8	73	190	91	—	1st	Win final series (Kanada-malja), 3–1 (TPS)
1996–97	SM-liiga	50	35	—	4	—	11	74	192	116	—	1st	Win final series (Kanada-malja), 3–0 (TPS)
1997–98	SM-liiga	48	24	—	5	—	19	53	139	137	—	4th	Won bronze medal game, 8–0 (K-Espoo)
1998–99	SM-liiga	54	31	—	3	—	20	65	171	140	—	3rd	Lost in 1st round, 0–3 (SaiPa)
1999–00	SM-liiga	54	27	—	9	—	18	63	147	131	—	5th	Lost final series (silver medal), 1–3 (TPS)
2000–01	SM-liiga	56	35	—	7	—	14	77	185	133	—	1st	Lost in 1st round, 2–3 (Kärpät)
2001–02	SM-liiga	56	29	2	9	0	16	71	160	102	—	3rd	Win final series (Kanada-malja), 3–1 (Tappara)
2002–03	SM-liiga	56	32	3	6	0	15	76	154	108	757	2nd	Lost bronze medal game, 0:3 (HPK)
2003–04	SM-liiga	56	23	4	7	3	19	64	131	120	869	7th	Lost in 2nd round, 2–4 (Kärpät)
2004–05	SM-liiga	56	34	3	—	4	15	113	163	96	743	2nd	Lost final series (silver medal), 1–3 (Kärpät)
2005–06	SM-liiga	56	19	4	—	4	29	69	149	190	1303	11th	Did not qualify
2006–07	SM-liiga	56	32	6	—	3	15	111	194	144	1243	2nd	Lost final series (silver medal), 0–3 (Kärpät)
2007–08	SM-liiga	56	29	5	—	8	14	105	179	152	1128	3rd	Lost bronze medal game, 3–4 (Tappara)
2008–09	SM-liiga	58	28	4	—	6	18	98	134	132	996	4th	Lost in 1st round, 1–4 (Kärpät)
2009–10	SM-liiga	58	22	4	—	4	28	78	144	157	901	10th	Lost in wild card round, 1–2 (Tappara)
2010–11	SM-liiga	60	25	6	—	9	20	96	165	150	811	6th	Lost in 1st round, 3–4 (HIFK)
2011–12	SM-liiga	60	24	8	—	13	15	101	165	183	770	6th	Won bronze medal game, 4:3 (2OT) (Espoo Blues)
2012–13	SM-liiga	60	28	10	—	7	15	111	168	136	778	1st	Lost in 2nd round, 2–4 (Lukko)
2013–14	Liiga	60	25	5	—	8	22	93	156	145	612	7th	Lost in wild card round, 0–2 (HPK)
2014–15	KHL	60	40	2	—	2	16	119	171	136	630	2nd, Bobrov	Lost in 2nd round, 1–4 (CSKA Moscow)
2015–16	KHL	60	36	1	—	4	19	108	167	140	773	1st, Bobrov	Lost in 1st round, 2–4 (Torpedo Nizhny Novgorod)
2016–17	KHL	60	29	6	—	6	19	93	149	165	763	3rd, Bobrov	Lost in 1st round, 0–4 (CSKA Moscow)
2017–18	KHL	56	29	4	—	8	15	103	151	108	—	3rd, Bobrov	Lost in 2nd round, 2–4 (CSKA Moscow)
2018–19	KHL	62	32	5	—	6	19	80	197	164	—	2nd, Bobrov	Lost in 1st round, 2–4 (Dynamo Moscow)
2019–20	KHL	62	28	10	—	8	16	84	184	164	—	2nd, Bobrov	Won in 1st round, 4–2 (Lokomotiv Yaroslavl); Playoffs abandoned due to the COVID-19 pandemic
2020–21	KHL	60	26	6	—	9	19	73	174	153	—	2nd, Bobrov	Lost in 1st round, 0–4 (Lokomotiv Yaroslavl)
2021–22	KHL	47	22	7	—	6	12	64	143	113	—	2nd, Bobrov	Lost in 1st round, 0–4* (Spartak Moscow); Withdrew from playoffs
2022–23	Team was inactive because of the 2022 Russian invasion of Ukraine and withdrawing from the KHL.												
2023–24	Mestis	48	23	10	—	5	10	94	179	120	—	3rd	Lost in 2nd round, 2–4 (Hermes)
2024–25	Mestis	49	32	7	—	3	7	113	178	72	—	1st	Won final series, 4–1 (IPK); Lost in Promotion playoffs, 1–4 (Pelicans)
2025–26	Mestis	49	30	7	—	4	8	108	172	95	—	1st	Won final series, 4–0 (Imatran Ketterä)
2026–27	Liiga	–	–	–	—	–	–	–	–	–	—	–	–

== See also ==
- FC Jokerit
- Jokerit FC
