= Teemu Henritius =

Finnish ice hockey player

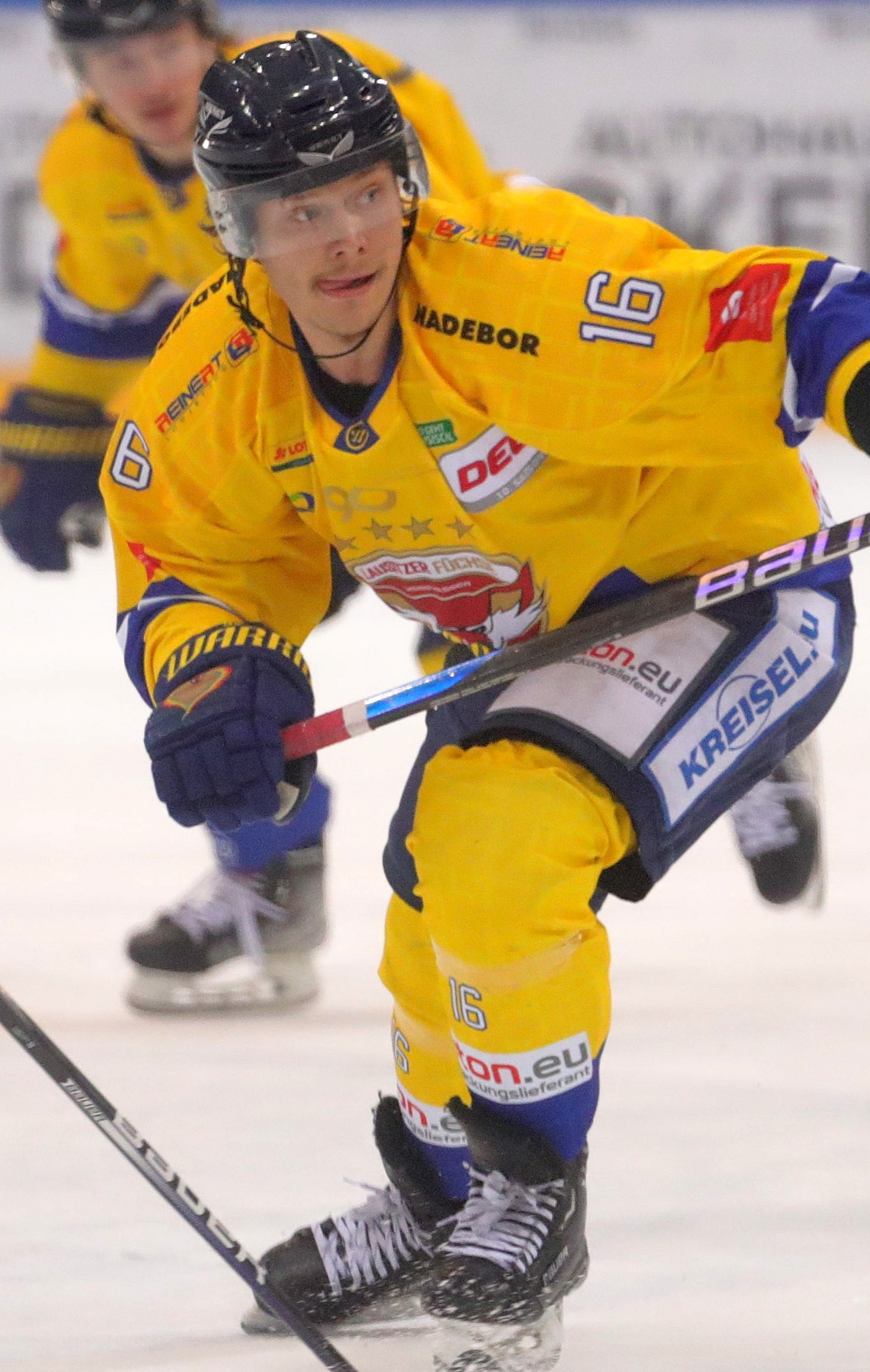
- Born: April 20, 1993 (age 32) Helsinki, Finland
- Height: 5 ft 11 in (180 cm)
- Weight: 176 lb (80 kg; 12 st 8 lb)
- Position: Right wing
- Shoots: Right
- Mestis team Former teams: Jokerit; Kiekko-Vantaa; Vaasan Sport; Mikkelin Jukurit; Lausitzer Füchse
- Playing career: 2012–present

Teemu Henritius (born April 20, 1993) is a Finnish ice hockey player. He is currently playing with Jokerit in the Finnish Mestis.

Henritius made his SM-liiga debut playing with Jokerit during the 2011–12 SM-liiga season.

After playing one season with Sport and seven seasons with Jukurit in the Liiga and one season with the DEL2 side Lausitzer Füchse, Henritius returns to Jokerit for the 2023-24 Mestis season.
