= 1970–71 SM-sarja season =

Finnish ice hockey season

The 1970–71 SM-sarja season was the 40th season of the SM-sarja, the top level of ice hockey in Finland. 12 teams participated in the league, and Ässat Pori won the championship.

== First round ==
	Club	GP	W	T	L	GF–GA	Pts
1.	Jokerit Helsinki	22	17	2	3	118:65	36
2.	HIFK Helsinki	22	16	1	5	126:64	33
3.	Ässät Pori	22	14	3	5	100:64	31
4.	Tappara Tampere	22	14	2	6	121:64	30
5.	HJK Helsinki	22	11	4	7	112:82	26
6.	Ilves Tampere	22	11	4	7	98:70	26
7.	TuTo Turku	22	9	2	11	90:112	20
8.	Koo-Vee Tampere	22	7	3	12	92:95	17
9.	TPS Turku	22	6	2	14	71:101	14
10.	Lukko Rauma	22	6	1	15	75:106	13
11.	SaPKo Savonlinna	22	5	2	15	61:125	12
12.	Kiekko-67 Turku	22	3	0	19	60:176	6

Sources: Elite Prospects;

== Final round ==
	Club	GP	W	T	L	GF–GA	Pts
1.	Ässät Pori	32	22	4	6	140:88	48
2.	Jokerit Helsinki	32	20	3	9	145:97	43
3.	HIFK Helsinki	32	19	2	11	159:105	40
4.	Tappara Tampere	32	17	5	10	157:94	39
5.	HJK Helsinki	32	16	4	12	147:119	36
6.	Ilves Tampere	32	15	6	11	135:114	36

Source: Elite Prospects

Preceded by 1969–70 SM-sarja season	SM-sarja season 1970–71	Succeeded by 1971–72 SM-sarja season
