= 1971–72 SM-sarja season =

Finnish ice hockey season

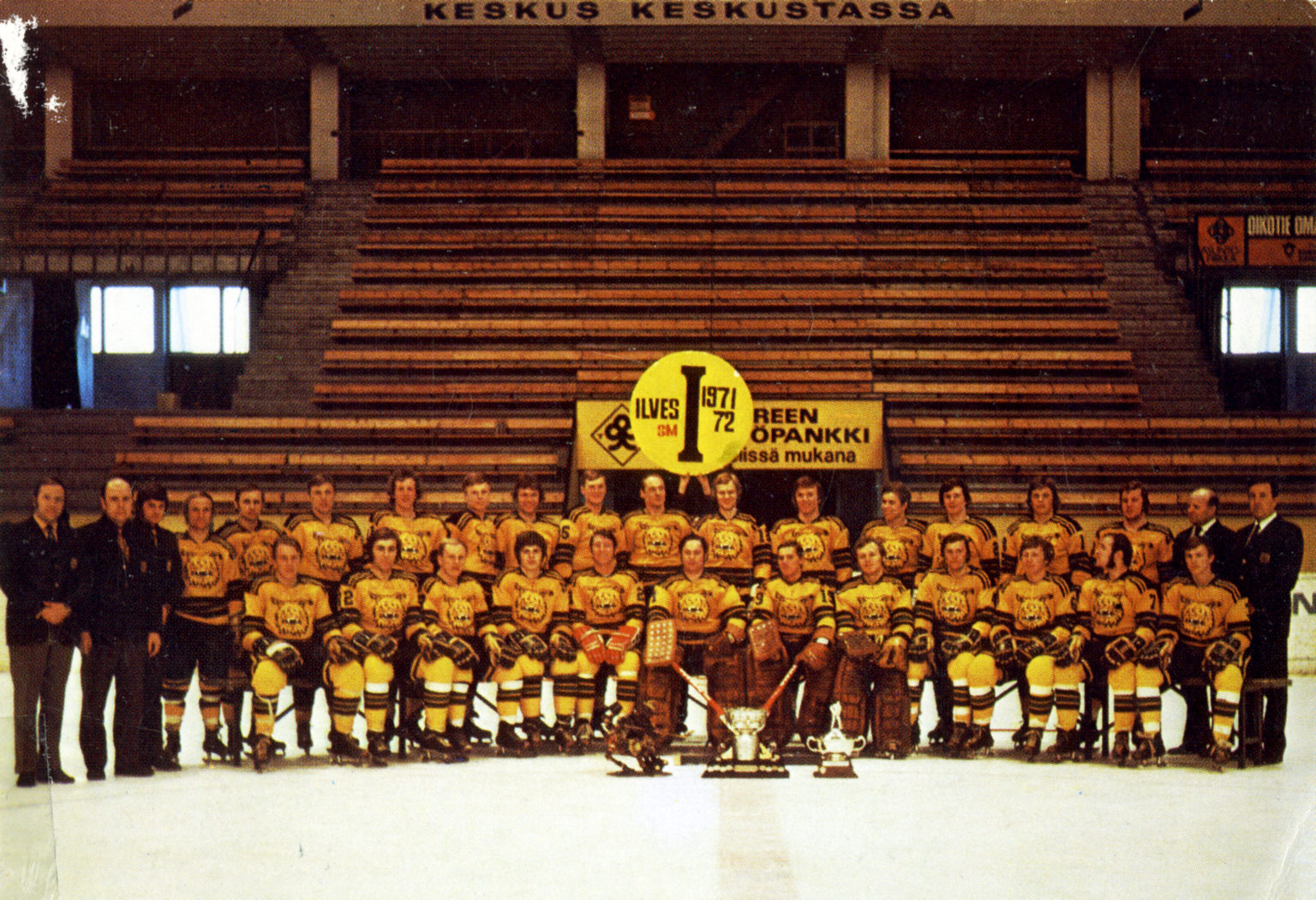
Season 1971-72 Finnish champion Ilves

The 1971–72 SM-sarja season was the 41st season of the SM-sarja, the top level of ice hockey in Finland. 12 teams participated in the league, and Ilves Tampere won the championship.

== First round ==
	Club	GP	W	T	L	GF–GA	Pts
1.	HJK Helsinki	22	14	3	5	114:57	31
2.	Ilves Tampere	22	15	1	6	121:70	31
3.	Tappara Tampere	22	13	4	5	89:48	30
4.	HIFK Helsinki	22	13	4	5	101:72	30
5.	Jokerit Helsinki	22	12	3	7	95:77	27
6.	TuTo Turku	22	10	6	6	76:68	26
7.	Koo-Vee Tampere	22	7	6	9	76:77	20
8.	TPS Turku	22	9	2	11	72:80	20
9.	Ässät Pori	22	7	3	12	75:77	17
10.	Lukko Rauma	22	6	3	13	66:98	15
11.	Karhu-Kissat Helsinki	22	4	4	14	74:130	12
12.	JoKP Joensuu	22	1	3	18	52:157	5

== Second round ==
=== Final round ===
	Club	GP	W	T	L	GF–GA	Pts
1.	Ilves Tampere	32	22	1	9	192:106	45
2.	HJK Helsinki	32	19	4	9	150:90	42
3.	HIFK Helsinki	32	18	5	9	137:113	41
4.	Jokerit Helsinki	32	18	3	11	132:111	39
5.	Tappara Tampere	32	16	5	11	127:88	37
6.	TuTo Turku	32	12	7	13	108:134	31

Source: Elite Prospects

=== Qualification round ===
	Club	GP	W	T	L	GF–GA	Pts
7.	TPS Turku	32	17	2	13	141:104	36
8.	Koo-Vee Tampere	32	14	6	12	122:116	34
9.	Ässät Pori	32	14	3	15	122:105	31
10.	Lukko Rauma	32	10	3	19	100:141	23
11.	Karhu-Kissat Helsinki	32	6	4	22	118:191	16
12.	JoKP Joensuu	32	3	3	26	79:229	9

Source: Elite Prospects

Preceded by 1970–71 SM-sarja season	SM-sarja season 1971–72	Succeeded by 1972–73 SM-sarja season
