= Leena Harkimo =

Finnish politician and businesswoman

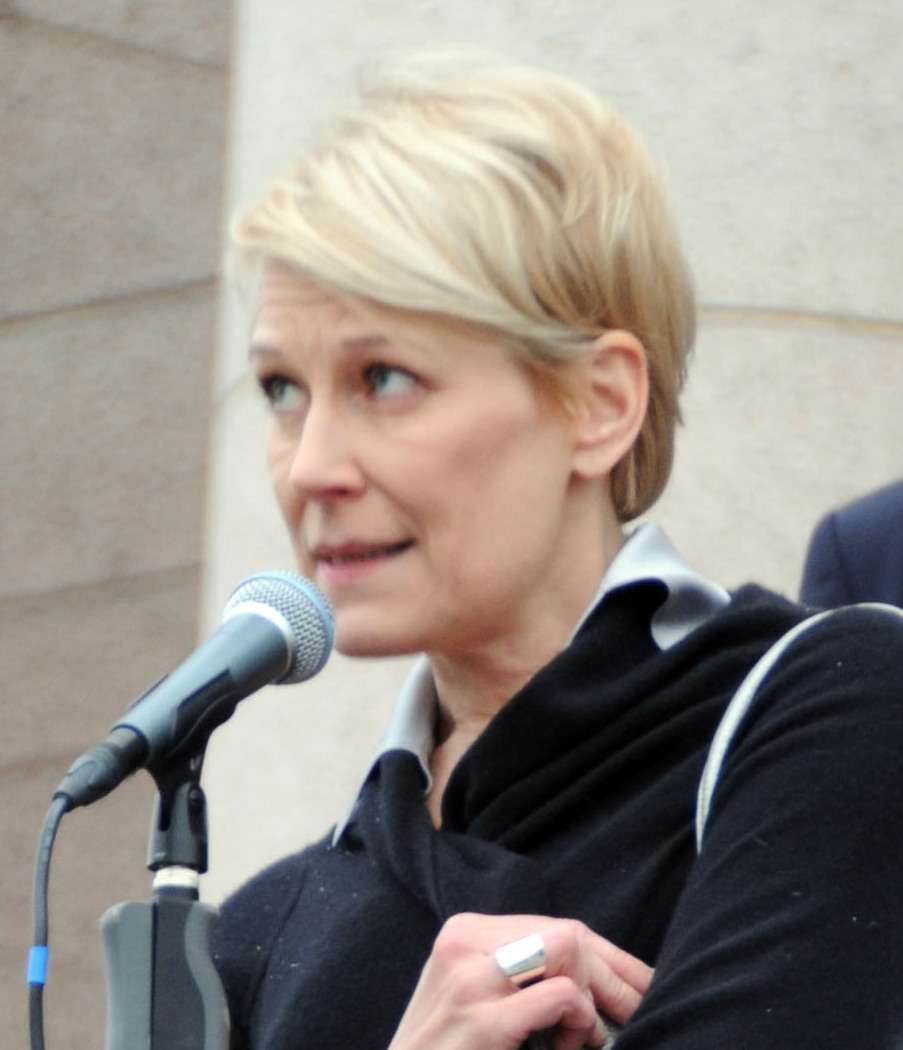
- Harkimo in 2009
- Born: Leena-Kaisa Alamäki; 28 March 1963; Pori, Finland
- Occupation: Business executive
- Political party: Kokoomus
- Spouse(s): Hjallis Harkimo, marr. 1989 — div. 2003

Member of Parliament of Finland
- In office 1999–2015

Leena Harkimo (née Alamäki; born 28 March 1963) is a Finnish business executive and ex-politician.

== Political career ==
In 1999, Harkimo was elected Member of Parliament from the Uusimaa constituency, representing the centre-right National Coalition Party (Kokoomus). She was re-elected at the 2003, 2007 and 2011 general elections, serving a total of 16 years, but chose not to contest the 2015 election.

== Business career ==
Prior to entering politics, Harkimo served from 1991 to 1999 as the CEO of the Finnish professional ice hockey team Jokerit, owned at the time by her then-husband, Hjallis Harkimo. During her leadership, Jokerit won the top-level Liiga national championship four times. She also sat on the Board of Liiga for much of that time.

After leaving Parliament, Harkimo joined the Finnish Fur Breeders Association, FiFur, in a lobbying role.

She also served for many years on the Supervisory Board of WWF Finland, stepping down to take up the FiFur post.

== Personal life ==
Leena and Hjallis Harkimo were married 1989—2003, and have two children together.

The couple co-judged the 2010 season of Diili, the Finnish version of the reality TV series The Apprentice.

Leena Harkimo's brother is the multiple Finnish and European rallycross champion Matti Alamäki.
