= 1969–70 SM-sarja season =

Finnish ice hockey season

The 1969–70 SM-sarja season was the 39th season of the SM-sarja, the top level of ice hockey in Finland. 10 teams participated in the league, and HIFK Helsinki won the championship.

== Regular season ==
	Club	GP	W	T	L	GF–GA	Pts
1.	HIFK Helsinki	22	17	3	2	122:61	37
2.	Ilves Tampere	22	17	0	5	161:70	34
3.	TuTo Turku	22	14	5	3	112:53	33
4.	TPS Turku	22	13	4	5	107:67	30
5.	Jokerit Helsinki	22	13	2	7	125:78	28
6.	Ässät Pori	22	9	5	8	86:59	23
7.	Tappara Tampere	22	8	4	10	112:94	20
8.	Lukko Rauma	22	7	5	10	81:96	19
9.	Koo-Vee Tampere	22	8	2	12	82:98	18
10.	SaPKo Savonlinna	22	7	2	13	98:103	16
11.	Hilpara Tampere	22	2	0	20	60:240	4
12.	Reipas Lahti	22	1	0	21	53:180	2

Source: Elite Prospects

Preceded by 1968–69 SM-sarja season	SM-sarja season 1969–70	Succeeded by 1970–71 SM-sarja season
