= Urpo Ylönen =

Finnish ice hockey player

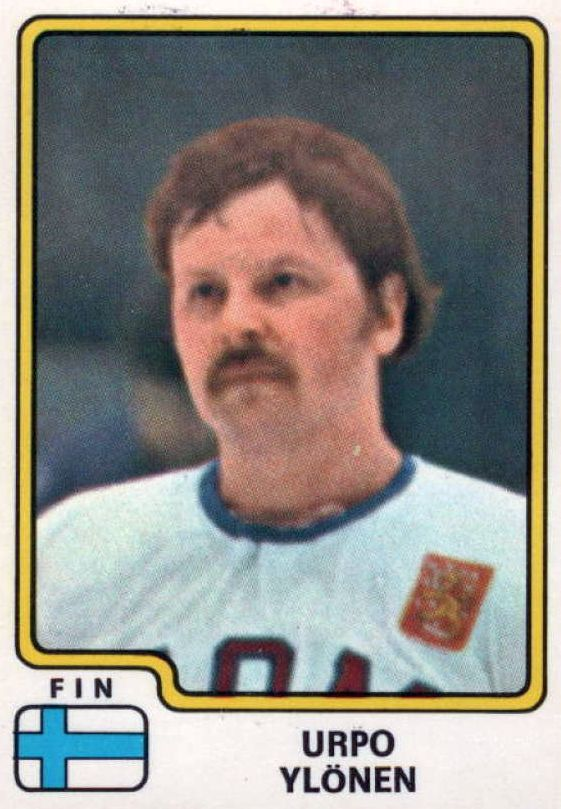
- Born: 25 May 1943 (age 81); Käkisalmi, Finland
- Height: 5 ft 8 in (173 cm)
- Weight: 165 lb (75 kg; 11 st 11 lb)
- Position: Goaltender
- Caught: Left
- Played for: TuTo; TPS; ERC Freiburg
- National team: Finland
- Playing career: 1957–1982

Urpo Yrjö Juhani Ylönen (born 25 May 1943 in Käkisalmi, Finland) is a goaltending coach and a retired professional ice hockey player who played in the SM-liiga. He played for TuTo and TPS. He was inducted into the Finnish Hockey Hall of Fame in 1988 and to the IIHF Hall of Fame in 1997. SM-liiga has named the goalie of the year award after him; the Urpo Ylönen trophy.

After his sporting career, Ylönen has made a renowned career as the head goaltending coach of TPS. Many European experts have called Ylönen "the best goaltending coach in Europe, if not in the world". Ylönen has been producing top level goalies year after year, including Miikka Kiprusoff, Fredrik Norrena, Antero Niittymäki, Jani Hurme, Alexander Salak and Ari Sulander.
