= Jari Kurri Trophy =

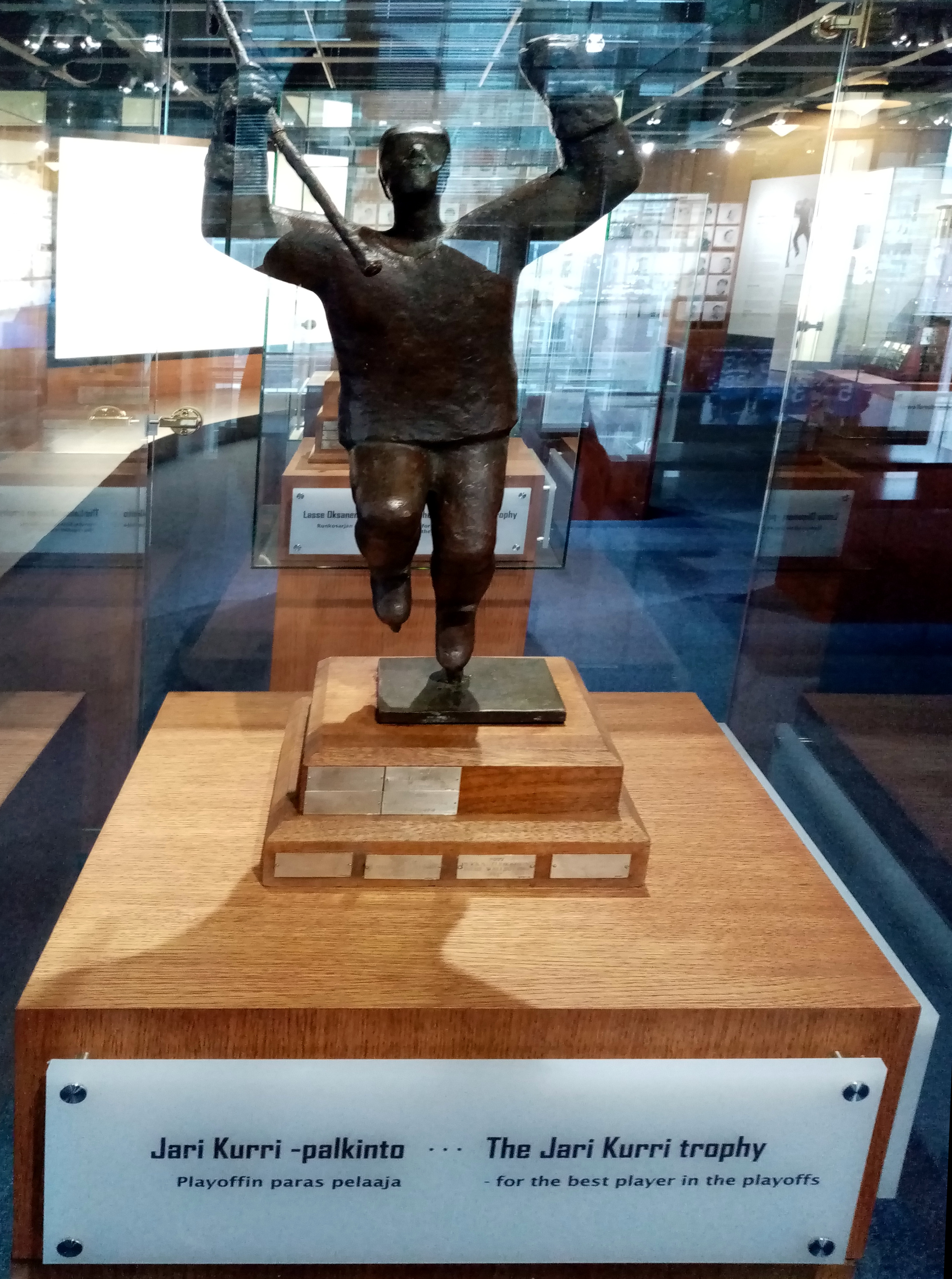
Jari Kurri Trophy

The Jari Kurri Trophy is an ice hockey trophy awarded by the Finnish Liiga to the best player in the Liiga playoffs. The trophy is named after Jari Kurri.

In the 2005–06 season, the trophy was awarded to the player voted the best player in the playoffs by the fans by an SMS vote. This practice was discontinued after only one season. Starting in 2007, in a similar fashion to NHL's Conn Smythe Trophy, the trophy has been awarded to the winner immediately after the final game of the playoffs instead of at the SM-liiga awards ceremony.

To date, Jussi Tarvainen in 2001 is the only player who was awarded the trophy while playing for the team that lost the finals.

Trophy winners:

- 1993-94: Ari Sulander (Jokerit)
- 1994-95: Saku Koivu (TPS)
- 1995-96: Petri Varis (Jokerit)
- 1996-97: Otakar Janecký (Jokerit)
- 1997-98: Olli Jokinen (HIFK)
- 1998-99: Miikka Kiprusoff (TPS)
- 1999-00: Tomi Kallio (TPS)
- 2000-01: Jussi Tarvainen (Tappara)
- 2001-02: Kari Lehtonen (Jokerit)
- 2002-03: Esa Pirnes (Tappara)
- 2003-04: Niklas Bäckström (Kärpät)
- 2004-05: Niklas Bäckström (Kärpät)
- 2005-06: Miika Wiikman (HPK) (SMS vote)
- 2006-07: Janne Pesonen (Kärpät)
- 2007-08: Tuomas Tarkki (Kärpät)
- 2008-09: Pekka Tuokkola (JYP) and Sinuhe Wallinheimo (JYP)
- 2009-10: Ilari Filppula (TPS)
- 2010-11: Toni Söderholm (HIFK)
- 2011-12: Jani Tuppurainen (JYP)
- 2012-13: Antti Raanta (Ässät)
- 2013-14: Juhamatti Aaltonen (Kärpät)
- 2014-15: Joonas Donskoi (Kärpät)
- 2015-16: Patrik Laine (Tappara)
- 2016-17: Jukka Peltola (Tappara)
- 2017-18: Julius Junttila (Kärpät)
- 2018-19: Otto Paajanen (HPK)
- 2019-20: No playoffs held due to COVID-19
- 2020-21: Eetu Koivistoinen (Lukko)
- 2021-22: Joona Luoto (Tappara)
- 2022-23: Veli-Matti Savinainen (Tappara)
- 2023-24: Christian Heljanko (Tappara)
- 2024-25: Juuso Mäenpää (KalPa)
- 2025-26: Joni Tuulola (Tappara)
