= Petr Bříza =

Czech ice hockey player

- Born: December 9, 1964 (age 61) Prague, Czechoslovakia
- Height: 6 ft 0 in (183 cm)
- Weight: 180 lb (82 kg; 12 st 12 lb)
- Position: Goaltender
- Caught: Left
- Played for: HC České Budějovice; HC Dukla Jihlava; HC Sparta Praha; Lukko; EV Landshut
- National team: Czechoslovakia and Czech Republic
- Playing career: 1981–2006
Medal record
Men's ice hockey
Representing Czechoslovakia
Olympic Games
| Bronze medal – third place | 1992 Albertville | Team |

Petr Bříza (born December 9, 1964) is a Czech former professional ice hockey goaltender. He played in goal on the bronze medal-winning Czechoslovak national team at the 1992 Winter Olympics.

== Awards ==
- Urpo Ylönen trophy for best goaltender in SM-liiga – 1992

| Preceded by Markus Ketterer | Winner of the Urpo Ylönen trophy 1991–92 | Succeeded by Timo Lehkonen |
