= Niklas Bäckström =

Finnish ice hockey player and coach

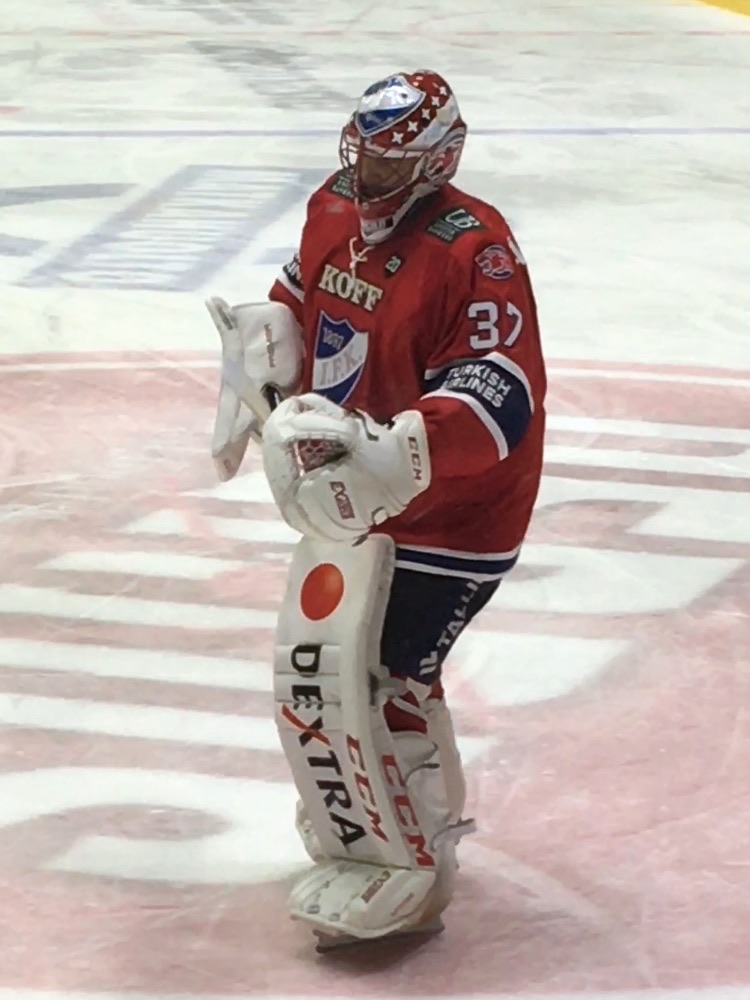
- Bäckström with HIFK in 2016
- Born: 13 February 1978 (age 48) Helsinki, Finland
- Height: 6 ft 2 in (188 cm)
- Weight: 197 lb (89 kg; 14 st 1 lb)
- Position: Goaltender
- Caught: Left
- Played for: HIFK; SaiPa; AIK IF; Kärpät; Minnesota Wild; Calgary Flames; Tappara
- National team: Finland
- NHL draft: Undrafted
- Playing career: 1996–2019
Medal record
Men's ice hockey
Representing Finland
Olympic Games
Silver medal – second place	2006 Turin
Bronze medal – third place	2010 Vancouver
World Championships
Silver medal – second place	2016 Russia
Bronze medal – third place	2008 Canada
World Junior Championship
Gold medal – first place	1998 Finland

Niklas Oskar Bäckström (Swedish: [ˈnɪ̌kːlas ˈbɛ̂kːstrœm]; born 13 February 1978) is a Finnish former professional ice hockey goaltender and current goaltending coach for the Columbus Blue Jackets. He played ten seasons for the Minnesota Wild and Calgary Flames in the National Hockey League (NHL), during which he won both the William M. Jennings Trophy and Roger Crozier Saving Grace Award. He also has won both Urpo Ylönen trophy and Jari Kurri trophy twice. Bäckström is a Swedish-speaking Finn, but also speaks Finnish.

== Playing career ==
=== Finland ===
Bäckström won the 1998 World Junior Ice Hockey Championships as a backup goaltender for the Finnish national team, along with players like Olli Jokinen, Niklas Hagman, Mika Noronen, Niko Kapanen, Toni Dahlman and Eero Somervuori. Bäckström was the third goaltender for Finland in the 2006 Winter Olympics in Turin, but did not play any games. In the Finnish SM-liiga, he played for HIFK, SaiPa and Kärpät. Bäckström led Kärpät to two consecutive league titles in 2004 and 2005. Subsequently, Bäckström signed a one-year contract with the Minnesota Wild of the NHL on 1 June 2006.

=== Minnesota Wild ===
Upon signing with the Wild, Bäckström attended their training camp and played in exhibition games ahead of the 2006–07 season. He played his first exhibition game in North America on 28 September 2006 against the St. Louis Blues, stopping 26 of 28 shots. Although he was initially expected to split his ice time with rookie Josh Harding, an unexpected injury made Bäckström the Wild's permanent backup for starting goaltender Manny Fernandez. Bäckström made his NHL debut on 7 October 2006, after being placed in relief of Fernandez following the first period. He made 17 saves over the next two periods to claim his first career win in a 6–5 victory over the Nashville Predators. Although he remained the Wild's backup, Fernandez struggled to win games for the Wild. In his seventh game with the Wild, and his second straight game as the Wild's starter, Bäckström recorded his first career shutout in a 4–0 victory over the Phoenix Coyotes on 24 November 2006. After Fernandez suffered a knee injury on 30 January, Bäckström thrived as the main starter, posting an 8–2–1 record over 11 games. In his first four games as the Wild's main starter, he maintained a 3–1–0 record which included a shutout and a season-high 41 saves. Later, he won three straight games and maintained a 1.62 goals-against average to earn the NHL's First Star of the Week honors for the week ending on 26 February. His outstanding play helped lift the Minnesota Wild to a 35–23–5 record and rank second in the Northwest standings with 75 points. However, shortly following this honor, Bäckström left the second period of a game against the Calgary Flames with a lower-body injury and was replaced by Harding. The injury did not force Bäckström out long term and he quickly returned as the Wild's starter for their game against the Boston Bruins a few days later. He finished the season posting a 3–0–0 record, 0.33 goals-against average, .986 save percentage and had two shutouts as the Wild finished the regular season second in the Northwest Division. He was subsequently recognized again as one of the NHL's Three Stars of the Week. Despite only playing as the Wild's start for half of the season, Bäckström finished first in the NHL in both goals against average (GAA) and save percentage to earn the Roger Crozier Saving Grace Award. He also co-received the William M. Jennings Trophy with Fernandez for allowing a League-low 191 goals. Bäckström and the Wild met with the Anaheim Ducks in Round One of the 2007 Stanley Cup playoffs. After losing the first three games of the series, Bäckström made 28 saves to clinch his first career playoff win and stave off a four-game sweep.

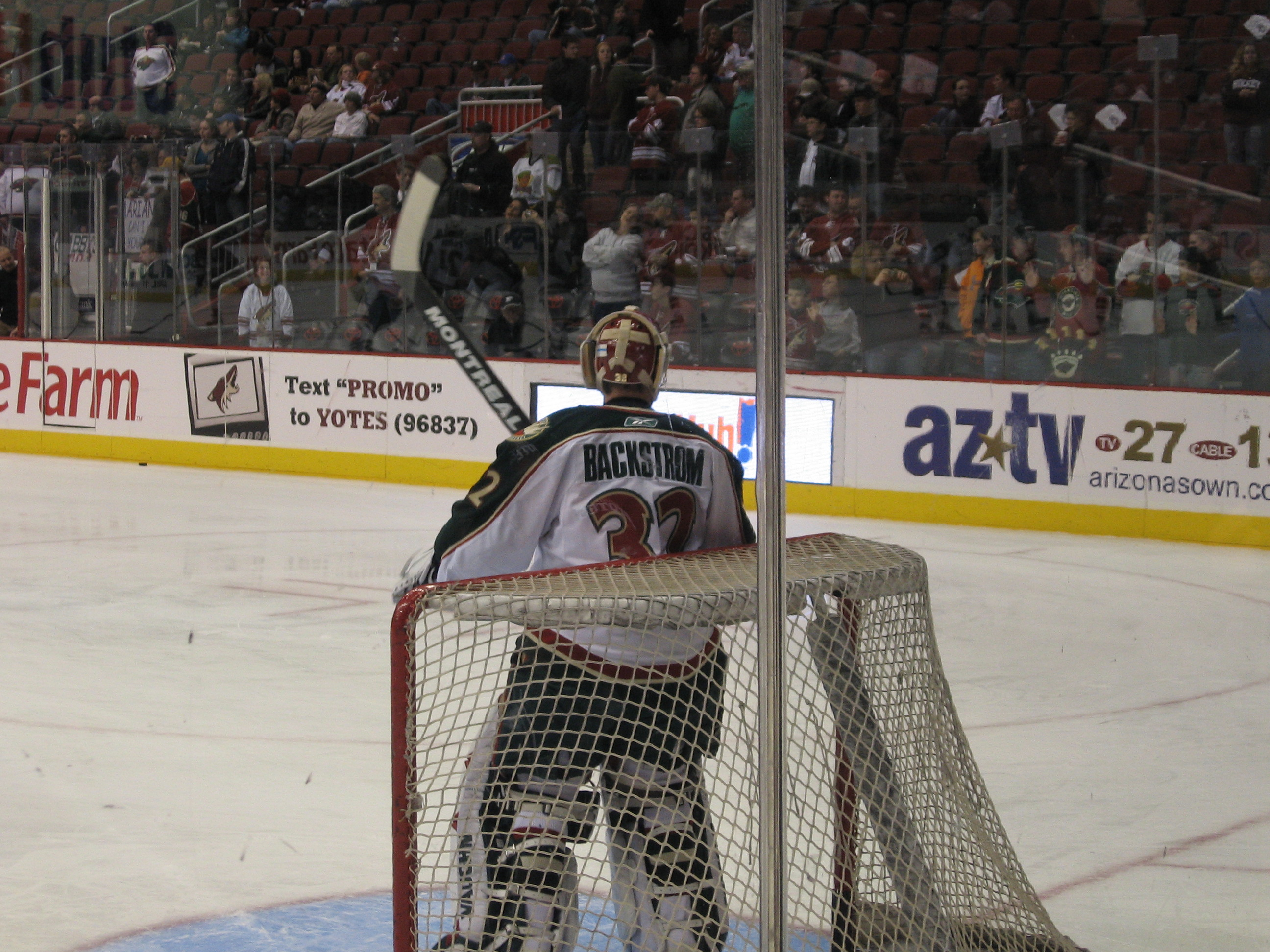
Bäckström tending the Wild's net in December 2007.

Ahead of the 2007–08 season, the Wild traded Fernandez to the Boston Bruins and signed Bäckström to a two-year $6.2-million contract extension. He subsequently became the de facto starting goaltender for the Wild and Harding became his backup. Bäckström started the season strong by winning his first four games while maintaining a 1.00 goals against average. Prior to suffering an injury near the end of October, Bäckström had made 114 saves on 121 shots and maintained a .942 a save percentage. Despite missing a few games due to injury, Bäckström maintained a 7–1–1 record with 1.88 goals against and .926 save percentage. He was subsequently named to the NHL's All-Star Ballot for the 2008 NHL All-Star Game after he maintained a 7–1–1 record with 1.88 goals against and .926 save percentage. Although he had returned from injury, Bäckström still lacked his previous efficiency in net and the Wild began to rely more on Harding. On 5 November, Bäckström won his 30th career NHL game in his 46th career NHL game to bring his career record to 30–9–7. Bäckström finished the month of November being recognized as the NHL's Third Star of the Week after he had recorded a 12–4–1 record, 2.22 goals against average, .916 save percentage and two shutouts through 18 games. When the NHL's All-Star voting concluded in early January, Bäckström ranked sixth among all eligible goaltenders as he received 79,727 votes. However, Bäckström failed to maintain the consistency he showed during his rookie season as he slumped during February and the Wild lost their first five games of March. They quickly bounced back as the month continued and Bäckström set a new franchise record with his 31st win of the season on 28 March. Bäckström continued to be consistent as he made 26 saves to lead the Wild to their first Northwest Division title in franchise history on 3 April. He finished the regular season with a 33–13–8 record, a 2.31 goals-against average, and a .920 save percentage. However, Bäckström and the Wild were unable to beat the Colorado Avalanche in their first round Stanley Cup playoff series.

In the final year of his contract, Bäckström returned to the Wild for the 2008–09 season where he set new career-highs in games played and wins. He was expected to regain his position as the Wild's main starter while Harding continued to serve as his backup. Bäckström showed an immediate return to his prime form as he recorded his 15th career shutout to lead the Wild to four straight wins to start the season. By mid-October, he led the Western Conference with 1.71 goals against and a .942 save percentage. As a result of his successful start, Bäckström was recognized as the NHL's Second Star of the Week for the week ending on 19 October. Bäckström helped the Wild remain undefeated in regulation throughout October until he was replaced by Harding after the first period of a game against the Dallas Stars. After allowing three goals in the first period, the Wild failed to regain the lead and fell 4–2 in regulation on 30 October. Bäckström recorded his second shutout of the season the following month to help the Wild clinch a 4–0 win over the Phoenix Coyotes. His third shutout of the season came on 3 December in another 4–0 win over the St. Louis Blues. Bäckström continued to record shutouts throughout the season and set a new franchise-record shutout streak of 149 minutes, 14 seconds on 7 January 2009. He beat the previous record of 147:54 before giving up a goal to Scott Hartnell in the second period of a game against the Philadelphia Flyers. At the time, he also maintained a 19–12–2 record with 2.14 goals against average through 33 games and was tied for first in the NHL in shutouts. As a result of his outstanding play, Bäckström was voted into his first-ever NHL All-Star Game in 2009. Prior to the All-Star break, Bäckström had improved to 22 wins on the season while falling to fifth among league goaltenders in goals against with 2.22 and sixth in save percentage. Bäckström continued to remain consistent in net for the Wild through February and March, leading him to sign a four-year, $24 million contract extension on 3 March as an unrestricted free agent. He concluded his third season with the Wild as only goaltender in the league to finish the regular season in the top five for wins, goals against, save percentage, and shutouts. He also set new franchise records for wins (37), games played (71), shutouts (eight), saves (1,900) and minutes played (4,088). After the Wild were eliminated from playoff contention, Bäckström underwent surgery on his left hip to remove two cysts. While recovering, Bäckström finished as the runner-up for the Vezina Trophy, awarded to the NHL's top goaltender.

After the Wild failed to qualify for the playoffs, the team replaced head coach Jacques Lemaire with Todd Richards and hired Chuck Fletcher as their new general manager ahead of the 2009–10 season. Bäckström and the Wild began the season with a losing 5–9–0 record and the teams' first road win came on 1 November. Bäckström's play began picking up through the month and he recorded his 100th career NHL win on 9 November against the Toronto Maple Leafs. Despite reaching this milestone, Bäckström continued to struggle and maintained a 7–8–2 record with a 2.67 goals against average through the first 17 games of the season. In December, Bäckström began an upswing in his goaltending as he recording his first shutout of the season, and maintained a 0.74 goals against average during a four-game win streak frpom 9 December 9 to 17 December. At the end of the month, Bäckström was named to Team Finland for the 2010 Winter Olympics in Vancouver. On 11 January 2010, Bäckström made 35 saves for his 113th career win in 208 games to tie Fernandez for the franchise record. He broke the record the following game after he made 29 saves against the Vancouver Canucks for his 114th win. At the end of the month, Bäckström missed four months due to a back injury and then underwent a procedure after falling ill. He eventually returned to the Wild lineup on 10 February for their game against the Phoenix Coyotes after missing a total of six games. He later missed seven more games in March due to a groin injury but he returned to the Wild lineup for their 24 March game against the San Jose Sharks. Shortly after returning to the lineup, Bäckström regained his original starter position as Harding suffered a season-ending injury. Coach Todd Richards defended Bäckström's declining record of 26–23–8, .903 save percentage, and 2.72 GAA by calling out the play of the teams' defencemen. In defence of Bäckström, Richards said: "A goalie needs to trust that the guys in front of him are doing certain things." Despite the Wild failing to quality for the 2010 Stanley Cup playoffs, Bäckström held the franchise record in wins and shutouts while ranking second in goals against and save percentage. As such, he was recognized by the franchise on their Year Ten All-Time team.

Unlike the previous seasons, Bäckström gained free agent José Théodore as his backup after Harding suffered another serious injury prior to the start of the 2010–11 season. Bäckström recorded his franchise-leading 20th career shutout on 2 November 2010 in a 1–0 win over the San Jose Sharks. By 12 November, Bäckström had maintained a 6–4–2 record with a 2.07 goals against average, and a .933 save percentage. As a result of his consistent play, Bäckström was named to the 2011 NHL All-Star ballot alongside teammates Mikko Koivu and Marek Židlický. Bäckström was ultimately not selected for the All-Star Game and missed four games in January with a hip injury. Upon returning to the Wild's lineup, Bäckström went on a 6–3–1 run with a 1.49 GAA, a .952 SV% and two shutouts over 10 starts. He also ranked third in the league in save percentages and tied for seventh in goals against. He finished the month of February ranked second in the league with a .940 save percentage and third with a 1.69 goals against average. His play slowed down in March as he experienced a six-game losing streak when starting, which he broke on 31 March against the Edmonton Oilers. During that game, he also continued to maintain the NHL active home win streak against a single team as he went 14–0–0 against the Oilers. Bäckström finished the 2010–11 season with a losing 22–23–5 record and a .916 save percentage. He later attributed his rough season to his lingering shoulder injury that he suffered in October and then re-aggravated at the end of February.

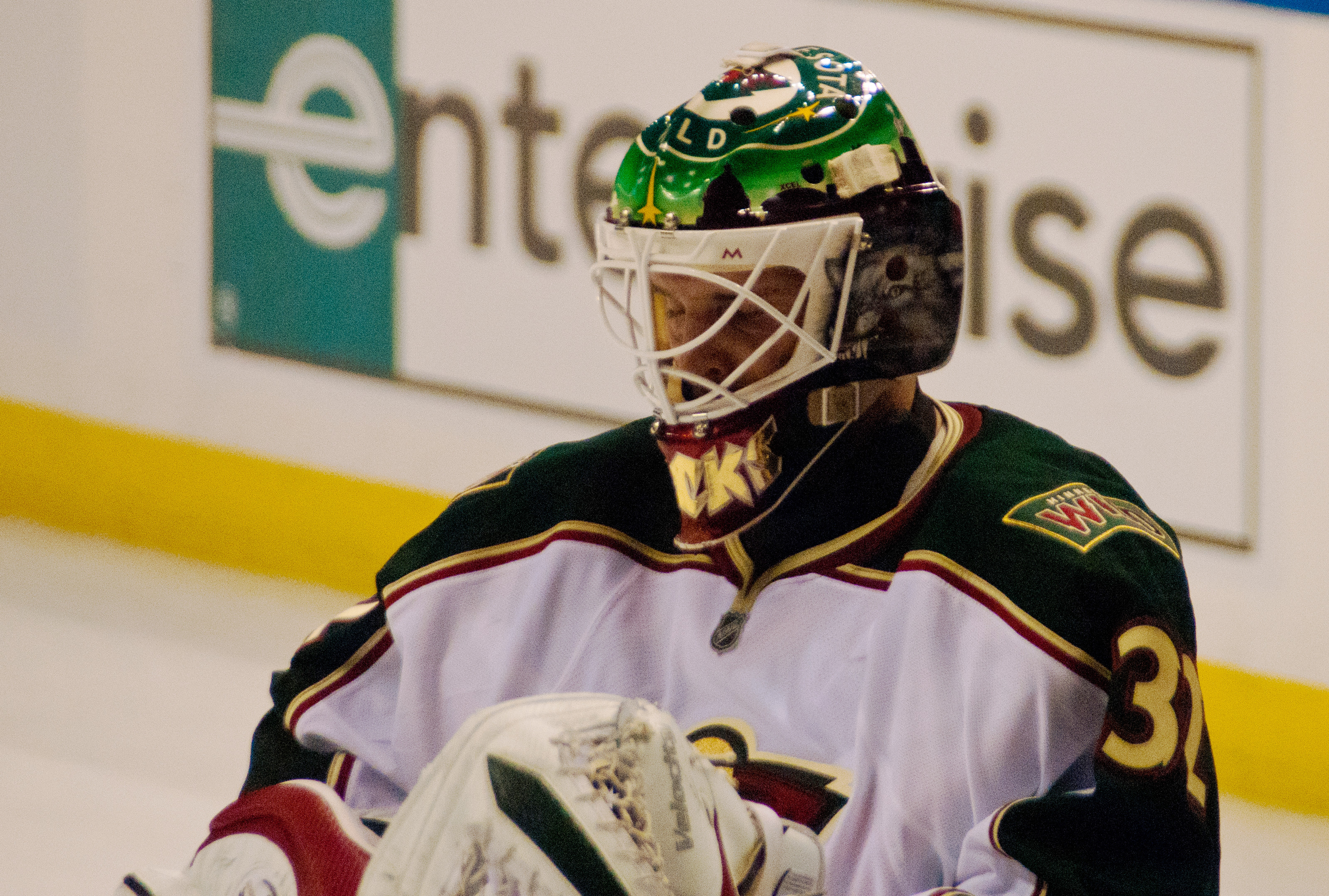
Bäckström in September 2011 while a member of the Wild

Bäckström returned to the Wild for the 2011–12 season as their starting goaltender with Harding as his backup. Through his first four games of the season, Bäckström seemed to return to form as he maintained a winning 2–1–1 record with a 1.93 GAA and a .928 save percentage. However, by November, new head coach Mike Yeo began alternating between Harding and Bäckström. Harding was maintaining a 4–0–1 record while Bäckström had a 3–3–2 record through eight games with a 2.30 GAA and .912 save percentage. Due to Harding's strong play, Bäckström sat out numerous games before returning to the Wild's lineup on 9 November and leading them to their fifth straight win. As the two began working in tandem, Bäckström had a winning 7–4–2 record by mid-November as the Wild averaged 2.35 goals per game and allowed 31.6 shots per game. His record placed him among the top five in the league among goaltenders who had made at least 10 starts. By the end of the month, Bäckström had a 10–5–2 record. As the two goaltenders continued to work in tandem, the Wild experienced a seven-game winning streak followed by an eight-game losing streak through the month of December. The Wild continued to struggle the following month as Harding suffered a concussion and Bäckström battled a groin injury and flu. On 19 February, Bäckström set both personal and franchise records during a shutout against the Boston Bruins. His 48 saves were a new career-best and the most ever by a Wild goaltender in a shutout in franchise history. However, his season was derailed again as he suffered a lower-leg injury during a game against the Montreal Canadiens on 1 March. At the time of the injury, he had a 17–17–6 record with a 2.44 goals against average and a .920 save percentage. He returned to the Wild lineup on 29 March where he made 25 saves against the Florida Panthers for his first win since late February against San Jose. Bäckström finished the 2011–12 season with a 19–18–7 record and a .919 save percentage through 46 games. Once the season concluded, he underwent minor surgery on his ankle.

Due to the 2012–13 NHL lockout, Bäckström agreed to join the Dynamo Minsk of the Kontinental Hockey League to start the season. However, he suffered an ankle injury before leaving for Belarus and remained in Minnesota to recover. Once the NHL resumed, Bäckström returned to form and retook his place as the Wild's starting goaltender while Harding adjusted to medication for multiple sclerosis. Through his first nine appearances of the season, Bäckström maintained a steady 2.53 goals against average and .909 save percentage. In the next four games, Bäckström improved to a 6–5–2 record with a 2.26 goals against average and .917 save percentage. At the end of the month, Bäckström was recognized as the NHL's Third Star of the Week after he recorded three consecutive wins against the Calgary Flames, Arizona Coyotes, and Edmonton Oilers. Bäckström continued his steady pace through the month of March and helped lead the Wild to five consecutive wins. Following their fifth consecutive win, Bäckström was recognized as the NHL's Second Star of the Week for the week ending on 24 March. The Wild's winning streak was eventually cut short at seven after they fell 5–3 to the Dallas Stars at the end of the month. During their winning streak, Bäckström maintained a 2.46 goals-against average and .922 save percentage. He finished the season with a 24–15–3 record, a 2.48 goals against average, a .909 save percentage, and two shutouts through 42 games. As the Wild qualified for the 2013 Stanley Cup playoffs, Bäckström was the de facto starter with Harding as his backup. However, he suffered a leg injury during warmups prior to Game 1 of their Western Conference quarterfinal series against the Chicago Blackhawks and he missed the remainder of the series. During the offseason, Bäckström underwent sports hernia surgery and was expected to return to the Wild for the 2013–14 NHL season.

While recovering from surgery, Bäckström signed a three-year, $10.25 million contract extension to remain with the Wild before becoming an unrestricted free agent. He began the 2013–14 season on a losing record before suffering a lower body injury during a game against the Nashville Predators on 8 October. He returned to the Wild's lineup on 25 October as a replacement for Harding during a game against the Carolina Hurricanes. After starting the next game against the Chicago Blackhawks, Bäckström did not start another game until 13 November. However, during this game, he suffered an upper-body injury after he was elbowed by Toronto Maple Leafs centre Nazem Kadri in the first period. Kadri was subsequently suspended for three games as a result. After Harding suffered an injury during warmups on 23 November, Bäckström took his place in his first game since his injury on 13 November. However, Bäckström was still experiencing soreness from his surgery and received cortisone shots to relieve pain and inflammation. While Bäckström and Harding were sidelined, Darcy Kuemper took over as the Wild's starting goaltender. Bäckström earned praise from teammates and coaches for his supportiveness of Kuemper while sidelined to the backup position. On 4 March, Bäckström was ruled out for the remainder of the season and the Wild acquired goaltender Ilya Bryzgalov to serve as Kuemper's backup. Bäckström finished the 2013–14 season with a 5–11–2 record and a 3.02 goals-against average and .899 save percentage. He later underwent surgery to resolve a core muscle injury he said bothered him for much of the season.

Bäckström returned to the Wild for the 2014–15 season which would prove to be his last with the organization. Prior to the start of the season, Harding suffered a foot injury and the Wild released Bryzgalov from his tryout. As such, Bäckström and Kuemper were expected to share the starting role for the Wild. Bäckström struggled during the first half of the season as he maintained a 5–3–3 record with a 2.58 goals-against average and .901 save percentage through his first 14 games. On 27 December, he was placed on the Wild's injured reserve to recover from an illness retroactive to 21 December. As both Bäckström and Kuemper struggled to maintain consistency in net, the Wild acquired Devan Dubnyk from the Arizona Coyotes on 14 January 2015. Once Dubnyk was acquired, Bäckström did not appear in another game for the Wild for the remainder of the season. He finished the season with a 3.04 goals-against average and a .887 save percentage through 19 games. It was later revealed that Bäckström had suffered nerve damage during the 2014 preseason and had limited use of his right hand. Meanwhile, Dubnyk immediately found consistency in net for the Wild and was named a finalist for the Vezina Trophy at the conclusion of the season.

=== Calgary Flames ===
Midway through the 2015–16 season, on 29 February 2016, Bäckström was traded to the Calgary Flames along with a draft pick in the 2016 NHL entry draft in exchange for forward David Jones. He appeared in four games for the Flames, recording two wins and two losses.

=== Return to Finland ===
On 10 June 2016, Bäckström effectively ended his NHL career after signing, as an impending free agent, a one-year contract with former club HIFK in Finland.

In May 2018, Bäckström signed a one-year contract with Tappara.

== Coaching ==
In July 2019, Bäckström was hired as the European goaltending development coach for the Columbus Blue Jackets. He remained in this role for four years before returning to the United States and serving as their team's goaltending coach.

== Personal life ==
Bäckström and his wife Heidi have two children: Benjamin and Isabella.

== Records ==
=== Minnesota Wild ===
- Most wins: 194
- Most shutouts in a season: 8 (2008–09)

== Career statistics ==
=== Regular season and playoffs ===
			Regular season										Playoffs
Season	Team	League	GP	W	L	T	OTL	MIN	GA	SO	GAA	SV%	GP	W	L	MIN	GA	SO	GAA	SV%
1994–95	HIFK	FIN U18	—	—	—	—	—	—	—	—	—	—	—	—	—	—	—	—	—	—
1995–96	HIFK	FIN U18	12	—	—	—	—	700	44	—	3.77	—	4	—	—	203	9	—	2.66	—
1996–97	HIFK	FIN U20	21	—	—	—	—	1244	57	—	2.75	.914	—	—	—	—	—	—	—	—
1996–97	HIFK	SM-l	2	0	0	0	—	30	3	0	6.00	.824	—	—	—	—	—	—	—	—
1996–97	PiTa	FIN.2	8	—	—	—	—	390	24	—	3.69	.875	—	—	—	—	—	—	—	—
1997–98	HIFK	FIN U20	14	7	7	0	—	846	42		2.98	.907	—	—	—	—	—	—	—	—
1997–98	Hermes	FIN.2	9	4	3	1	—	468	23	1	2.95	.912	—	—	—	—	—	—	—	—
1998–99	HIFK	FIN U20	8	—	—	—	—	—	—	—	3.01	.902	—	—	—	—	—	—	—	—
1998–99	HIFK	SM-l	16	9	5	1	—	923	26	1	1.69	.932	—	—	—	—	—	—	—	—
1999–00	HIFK	SM-l	4	0	4	0	—	155	17	0	6.58	.785	—	—	—	—	—	—	—	—
1999–00	FPS	FIN.2	22	13	8	1	—	1322	50	1	2.27	.928	3	1	2	178	8	0	2.69	.913
2000–01	SaiPa	SM-l	49	22	24	2	—	2826	120	2	2.55	.924	—	—	—	—	—	—	—	—
2001–02	AIK	SEL	40	—	—	—	—	2186	111	1	3.05	.897	—	—	—	—	—	—	—	—
2002–03	Kärpät	SM-l	36	16	8	9	—	2136	77	4	2.16	.929	15	7	8	990	33	1	2.00	.939
2003–04	Kärpät	SM-l	43	24	8	8	—	2572	87	7	2.03	.936	15	9	6	926	36	1	2.33	.925
2004–05	Kärpät	SM-l	47	27	10	—	10	2819	102	7	2.17	.927	12	10	2	720	15	3	1.25	.950
2005–06	Kärpät	SM-l	51	32	9	—	10	3078	86	10	1.68	.940	4	3	1	195	6	0	1.85	.897
2006–07	Minnesota Wild	NHL	41	23	8	—	6	2227	73	5	1.97	.929	5	1	4	297	11	0	2.22	.924
2007–08	Minnesota Wild	NHL	58	33	13	—	8	3409	131	4	2.31	.920	6	2	4	361	17	0	2.83	.900
2008–09	Minnesota Wild	NHL	71	37	24	—	8	4088	159	8	2.33	.923	—	—	—	—	—	—	—	—
2009–10	Minnesota Wild	NHL	60	26	23	—	8	3489	158	2	2.72	.903	—	—	—	—	—	—	—	—
2010–11	Minnesota Wild	NHL	51	22	23	—	5	2978	158	3	2.66	.916	—	—	—	—	—	—	—	—
2011–12	Minnesota Wild	NHL	46	19	18	—	7	2590	105	4	2.43	.919	—	—	—	—	—	—	—	—
2012–13	Minnesota Wild	NHL	41	24	15	—	3	2368	98	2	2.48	.909	—	—	—	—	—	—	—	—
2013–14	Minnesota Wild	NHL	21	5	11	—	2	1094	55	0	3.02	.899	—	—	—	—	—	—	—	—
2014–15	Minnesota Wild	NHL	19	5	7	—	3	1005	51	0	3.04	.887	—	—	—	—	—	—	—	—
2015–16	Calgary Flames	NHL	4	2	2	—	0	232	13	0	3.35	.881	—	—	—	—	—	—	—	—
2016–17	HIFK	Liiga	17	8	5	—	4	382	32	1	1.87	.923	2	1	1	105	6	0	3.42	.864
2017–18	HIFK	Liiga	7	2	2	—	2	314	13	1	2.48	.894	—	—	—	—	—	—	—	—
2018–19	Tappara	Liiga	15	11	1	—	2	863	26	2	1.73	.921	1	0	0	50	0	0	0.00	1.000
Liiga totals			287	151	76	20	28	16,098	589	35	2.20	—	49	30	18	2986	96	5	1.93	—
NHL totals			413	196	144	—	50	23,481	975	28	2.49	.914	11	3	8	658	28	0	2.55	.911

=== International ===
Year	Team	Event	GP	W	L	T	MIN	GA	SO	GAA	SV%
1998	Finland	WJC	2	1	0	1	120	5	1	2.50	.911
2005	Finland	WC	5	1	1	3	310	12	1	2.32	.902
2006	Finland	OG	DNP	—	—	—	—	—	—	—	—
2006	Finland	WC	DNP	—	—	—	—	—	—	—	—
2008	Finland	WC	8	6	2	—	483	17	1	2.11	.922
2010	Finland	OG	2	1	0	—	110	2	1	1.09	.952
2016	Finland	WC	DNP	—	—	—	—	—	—	—	—
Senior totals			15	8	3	3	903	31	3	2.06	.919

== Awards ==
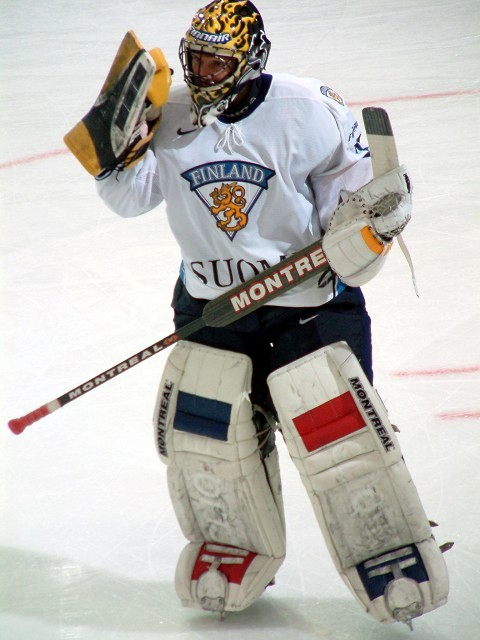
Bäckström during the 2005 IIHF World Championship

Award	Year
SM-Liiga
Kanada-malja Champion	2004, 2005
Runner-up	1999, 2003
Bronze	2006, 2018, 2019
Jari Kurri trophy	2004, 2005
Urpo Ylönen trophy	2004, 2005
NHL
Roger Crozier Saving Grace Award	2007
William M. Jennings Trophy	2007
Vezina Trophy finalist	2009
NHL All-Star	2009

Awards and achievements
Preceded by Jussi Markkanen	Winner of the Urpo Ylönen trophy 2003–04, 2004–05	Succeeded by Juuso Riksman
Preceded by Esa Pirnes	Winner of the Jari Kurri trophy 2003–04, 2004–05	Succeeded by Miika Wiikman
Preceded by Miikka Kiprusoff	Winner of the Jennings Trophy; 2007 (with Manny Fernandez)	Succeeded by Chris Osgood and Dominik Hasek
Preceded by Cristobal Huet	Winner of the Crozier Award; 2007	Succeeded by Final winner
