= Juuso Riksman =

Finnish ice hockey player (born 1977)

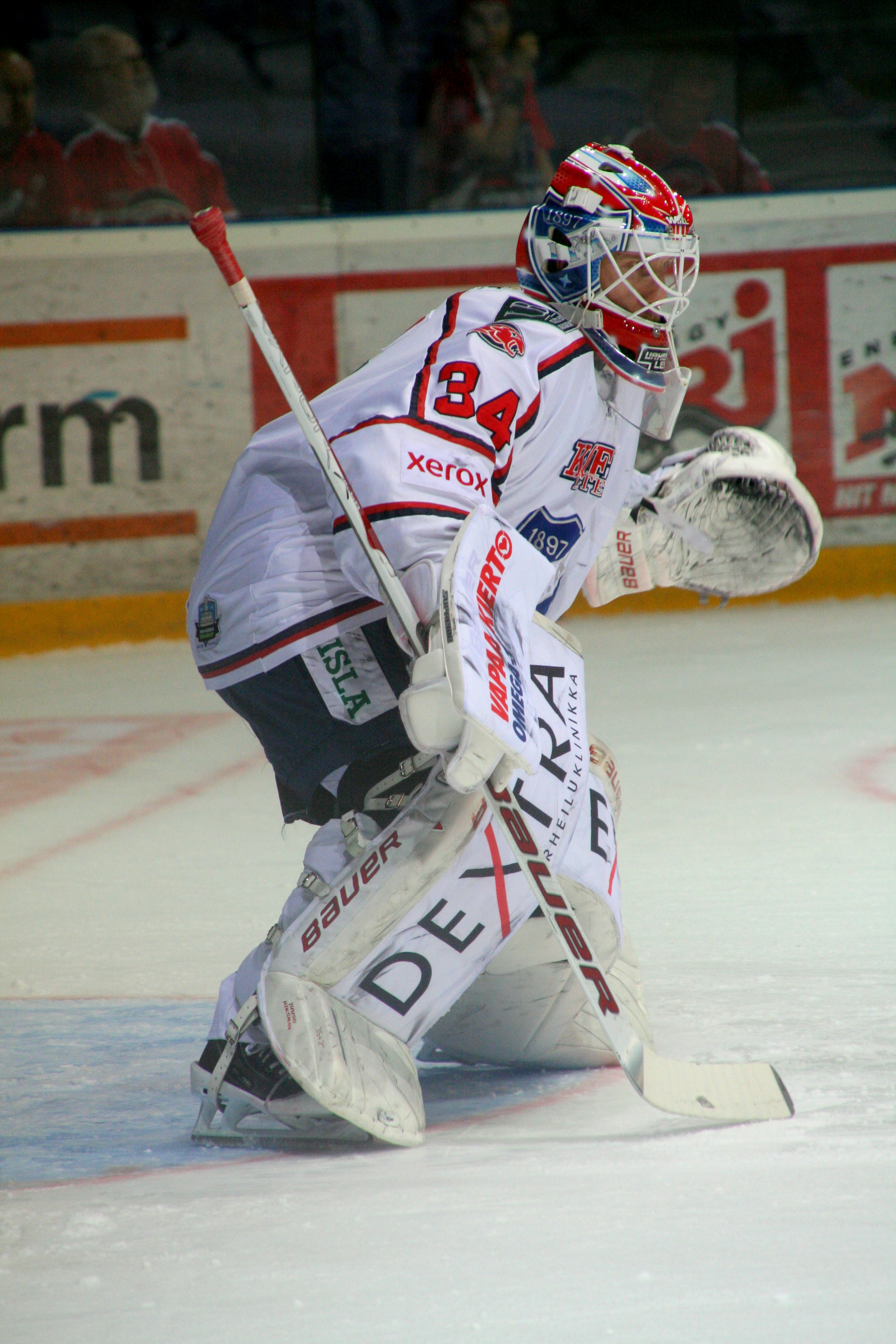
- Riksman with HIFK in 2011
- Born: 1 April 1977 (age 48) Helsinki, Finland
- Height: 6 ft 1 in (185 cm)
- Weight: 180 lb (82 kg; 12 st 12 lb)
- Position: Goaltender
- Caught: Left
- Played for: HIFK; Modo Hockey; Ilves; Ässät Pori; Jokerit; Färjestad BK; Lokomotiv Yaroslavl; Espoo Blues
- National team: Finland
- NHL draft: Undrafted
- Playing career: 1996–2016

Juuso Riksman (born 1 April 1977) is a Finnish former professional ice hockey goaltender who played in the Finnish Liiga and Swedish Hockey League.

== Playing career ==
Riksman played junior hockey in Espoon Palloseura and in the HIFK organization, but he started his pro career with Hermes of Kokkola, then in the 1st division. After a visit to Kiruna in the Swedish 1st division, Riksman returned to HIFK. When Tom Draper was hired as HIFK's starting goaltender, Riksman signed with MoDo Hockey in Sweden, and after two seasons in Sweden, a year in Italy with Alleghe HC and one season with Ilves, he led Ässät to a silver medal in 2006 and won the Urpo Ylönen trophy as the league's best goaltender. Subsequently, Riksman was signed by Jokerit to a two-year contract. He retired in 2016.

In June 2007, the St. Louis Blues of the NHL signed Riksman to a contract. He was later sent to the Blues' AHL affiliate, the Peoria Rivermen. Riksman appeared in his first and only professional game in North America on November 10 against the Rockford IceHogs, allowing two goals in only eight minutes of play. He was then pulled and replaced by Marek Schwarz.

After Peoria's loss to San Antonio on November 17, Riksman announced that he had quit the team and was returning to Finland, leading to a suspension by Rivermen general manager Kevin McDonald. Since the announcement, Riksman signed first with Färjestad in Swedish Elite League, then Lokomotiv Yaroslavl in the Russian Super League before returning to Finland, and Jokerit in Helsinki.

== Awards ==
- SM-liiga silver medal with Ässät in 2006
- Urpo Ylönen trophy for best goaltender in the SM-liiga in 2006 and 2009
- SM-liiga silver medal with Jokerit in 2007
- Kultainen kypärä -award for best player in the SM-liiga, 2009
- SM-liiga gold medal with HIFK in 2011

Preceded by Niklas Bäckström; Tuomas Tarkki	Winner of the Urpo Ylönen trophy 2005–06; 2008–09	Succeeded by Tuomas Tarkki incumbent
Preceded by Ville Leino	Winner of the Lasse Oksanen trophy 2008–09	Succeeded by incumbent
