= Pasi Nurminen =

Finnish ice hockey player (born 1975)

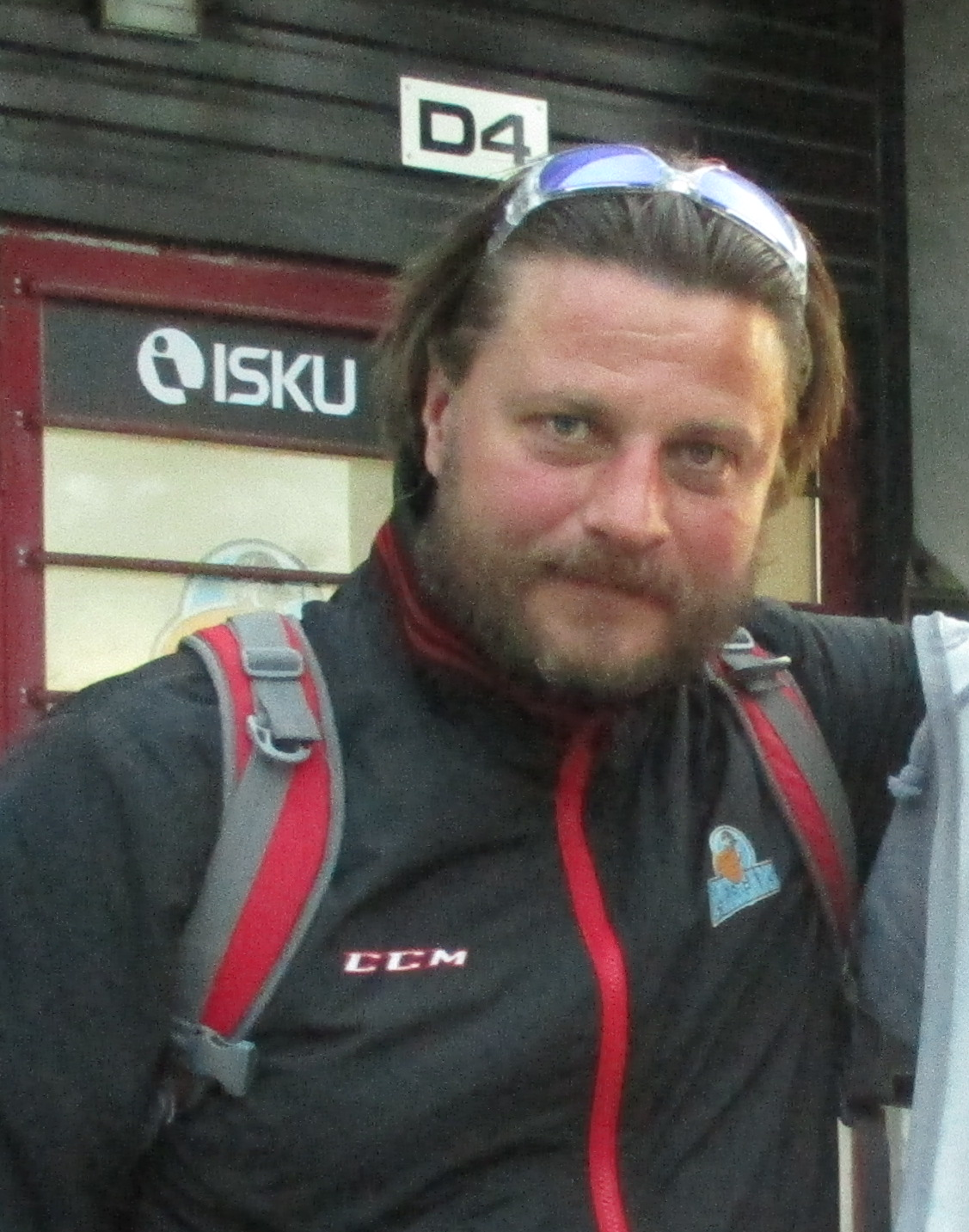
- Pasi Nurminen
- Born: 17 December 1975 (age 50) Lahti, Finland
- Height: 5 ft 10 in (178 cm)
- Weight: 210 lb (95 kg; 15 st 0 lb)
- Position: Goaltender
- Caught: Left
- Played for: NHL; Atlanta Thrashers; SM-liiga; Pelicans; HPK; Jokerit; Elitserien; Malmö Redhawks
- National team: Finland
- NHL draft: 189th overall, 2001; Atlanta Thrashers
- Playing career: 1994–2005

Pasi Johan Olavi Nurminen (born 17 December 1975) is a Finnish former professional ice hockey goaltender. He was drafted by the Atlanta Thrashers as their sixth-round pick, #189 overall, in the 2001 NHL entry draft.

== Playing career ==
Nurminen started his playing career with Reipas Lahti in Finland and later moved on to Ketterä Imatra and Pelicans. In 1998 he moved to HPK and then to Jokerit a year later, where he won the Urpo Ylönen trophy as best goaltender in the SM-liiga. After two seasons with Jokerit, he moved across the Atlantic to represent the Atlanta Thrashers. Nurminen played for Malmö IF in the Swedish Elitserien, and his hometown team, Pelicans, during the NHL lockout. He retired in August 2005 after suffering a career-ending knee injury.

He currently works as a goaltending consultant for Pelicans, the SM-liiga hockey team he also partially owns. Starting from 2010, he also serves the same role for the Finnish National Team and has even featured as their backup goalie during the Euro Hockey Tour.

== Career statistics ==
=== Regular season and playoffs ===
			Regular season									Playoffs
Season	Team	League	GP	W	L	T	MIN	GA	SO	GAA	SV%	GP	W	L	MIN	GA	SO	GAA	SV%
1993–94	Reipas Lahti U20	FIN Jr. A	25	—	—	—	—	—	—	3.80	—	—	—	—	—	—	—	—	—
1993–94	Reipas Lahti	FIN	1	—	—	—	30	2	0	4.00	—	—	—	—	—	—	—	—	—
1994–95	Reipas Lahti U20	FIN Jr. A	16	—	—	—	963	40	2	2.49	—	—	—	—	—	—	—	—	—
1994–95	Reipas Lahti	FIN-2	9	—	—	—	423	46	0	6.52	.812	—	—	—	—	—	—	—	—
1995–96	Imatran Ketterä	FIN-2	38	8	21	8	2204	146	0	3.97	.910	—	—	—	—	—	—	—	—
1996–97	Pelicans	FIN-2	30	—	—	—	1726	69	0	2.40	.925	3	—	—	204	8	0	2.35	—
1997–98	Pelicans	FIN-2	30	16	7	4	1744	48	7	1.65	.941	8	5	3	481	15	1	1.87	—
1998–99	HPK	FIN	48	24	17	6	2811	127	2	2.71	.915	7	3	4	425	24	1	3.39	.908
1999–00	Jokerit	FIN	48	24	14	9	2769	104	6	2.25	.931	11	7	4	719	22	2	1.84	.945
2000–01	Jokerit	FIN	52	30	11	6	2971	107	5	2.16	.935	5	2	3	308	11	1	2.14	.928
2001–02	Atlanta Thrashers	NHL	9	2	5	0	465	28	0	3.61	.898	—	—	—	—	—	—	—	—
2001–02	Chicago Wolves	AHL	20	9	9	1	1165	57	2	2.93	.904	21	15	5	1267	41	2	1.94	.935
2002–03	Atlanta Thrashers	NHL	52	21	19	5	2856	137	2	2.88	.906	—	—	—	—	—	—	—	—
2003–04	Atlanta Thrashers	NHL	64	25	30	7	3738	173	3	2.78	.903	—	—	—	—	—	—	—	—
2004–05	Pelicans	FIN	16	2	7	6	965	48	0	2.98	.921	—	—	—	—	—	—	—	—
2004–05	Malmö Redhawks	SWE	30	—	—	—	1755	86	3	2.94	.900	—	—	—	—	—	—	—	—
NHL totals			126	48	54	12	7060	338	5	2.87	.904	—	—	—	—	—	—	—	—

=== International ===
Year	Team	Event	GP	W	L	T	MIN	GA	SO	GAA	SV%
2000	Finland	WC	1	1	0	0	60	1	0	1.00	.960
2001	Finland	WC	7	5	1	0	411	12	0	1.75	.938
2002	Finland	OLY	1	1	0	0	60	1	0	1.00	.952
2003	Finland	WC	5	1	3	1	258	10	0	2.33	.923
Senior totals			14	8	4	1	789	24	1	1.83	—

== Awards ==
- Urpo Ylönen trophy - 2000
- Jack A. Butterfield Trophy - 2002

Preceded by Miikka Kiprusoff	Winner of the Urpo Ylönen trophy 1999–00	Succeeded by Jussi Markkanen
Preceded by Steve Bégin	Winner of the Jack A. Butterfield Trophy; 2001–02	Succeeded by Johan Holmqvist
