= Miika Wiikman =

Swedish-born Finnish ice hockey player

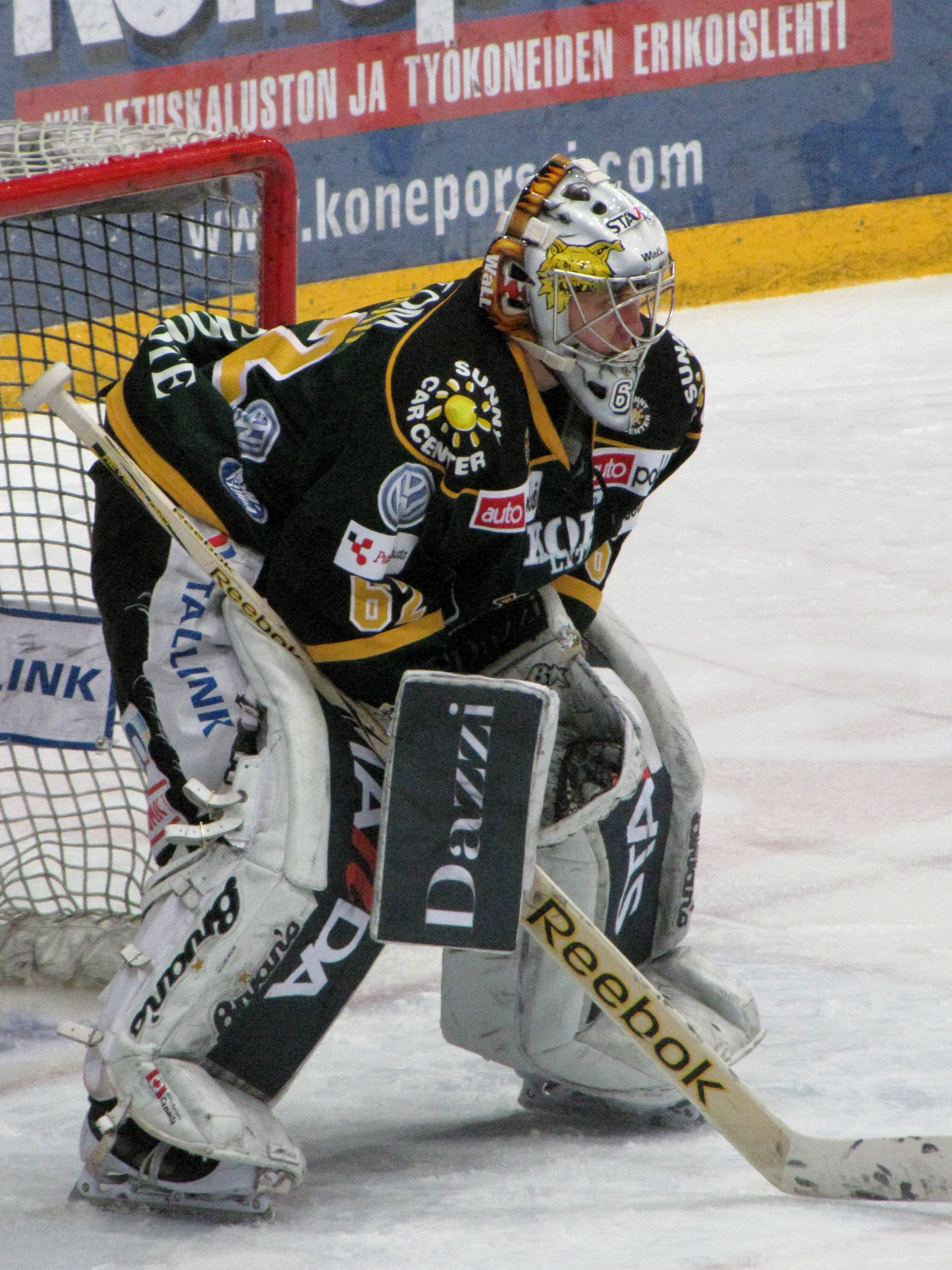
- Born: October 17, 1984 (age 42) Mariestad, Sweden
- Height: 6 ft 0 in (183 cm)
- Weight: 176 lb (80 kg; 12 st 8 lb)
- Position: Goaltender
- Catches: Left
- team Former teams: Free agent HPK; Hartford Wolf Pack; San Antonio Rampage; Lukko; Ilves Tampere; Kärpät; SaiPa; Jokerit; HC ’05 Banská Bystrica; HDD Olimpija Ljubljana; Nottingham Panthers; Milton Keynes Lightning; Coventry Blaze; Anglet Hormadi Élite
- NHL draft: Undrafted
- Playing career: 2004–present

Miika Wiikman (born October 17, 1984) is a Swedish-born Finnish professional ice hockey goaltender. He is currently a free agent, having last played for Anglet Hormadi Élite of the Ligue Magnus.

== Playing career ==
Wiikman started his junior career in Sweden with HV71 before moving to HPK in Finland, with whom he won the SM-liiga championship in 2006 and was a recipient of the Jari Kurri trophy as the Playoff MVP. He signed an AHL contract with the Hartford Wolf Pack on June 4, 2007.

Miika started the 2007–08 season splitting playing time with Al Montoya. After the latter's trade to the Phoenix Coyotes organization, Wiikman became Hartford's primary goaltender, finishing the season with a 21–8–3 record, during which he was awarded Player of the Week on January 27, 2008. On April 24, 2008, he signed an NHL entry-level contract with the Rangers.

He opened the 2009–10 season again with Hartford before he was reassigned to the Charlotte Checkers of the ECHL. On March 3, 2010, Wiikman was traded by the Rangers to the Phoenix Coyotes for Anders Eriksson. He was then assigned to AHL affiliate, the San Antonio Rampage for the remainder of the season.

On April 26, 2010, Wiikman returned to Finland's SM-liiga, signing a one-year contract with Lukko for the 2010–11 season.

On June 21, 2015, Wiikman continued his journeyman career by moving to England to play for the Nottingham Panthers of the Elite ice hockey league. Wiikman departed Nottingham in April 2017, following two years with the team.

In September 2017, Wiikman signed with EIHL new-boys Milton Keynes Lightning as short-term injury cover following an injury to their number one netminder in pre-season.

In August 2018, Wiikman signed for fellow EIHL side Coventry Blaze after it was confirmed that incumbent netminder Kevin Nastiuk was not returning to the club.

Wiikman, a dual citizen, has played on the Finnish national team and the Swedish national junior team.

== Career statistics ==
			Regular season									Playoffs
Season	Team	League	GP	W	L	T/OT	MIN	GA	SO	GAA	SV%	GP	W	L	MIN	GA	SO	GAA	SV%
2004–05	HPK Hämeenlinna	SM-l	23	9	5	9	1361	54	2	2.38	.923	2	1	1	118	4	0	2.03	.913
2005–06	HPK Hämeenlinna	SM-l	34	21	7	5	1949	68	3	2.09	.929	11	8	2	607	20	3	1.98	.929
2006–07	HPK Hämeenlinna	SM-l	18	8	6	4	1066	46	0	2.59	.908	—	—	—	—	—	—	—	—
2007–08	Hartford Wolfpack	AHL	34	21	8	3	1907	73	2	2.30	.919	1	0	1	59	3	0	3.07	.842
2007–08	Charlotte Checkers	ECHL	4	1	1	2	254	10	0	2.36	.922	—	—	—	—	—	—	—	—
2008–09	Hartford Wolf Pack	AHL	43	21	18	4	2463	111	2	2.70	.904	—	—	—	—	—	—	—	—
2009–10	Hartford Wolf Pack	AHL	7	2	4	0	343	24	0	4.20	.869	—	—	—	—	—	—	—	—
2009–10	Charlotte Checkers	ECHL	17	9	3	3	971	46	1	2.84	.906	—	—	—	—	—	—	—	—
2009–10	San Antonio Rampage	AHL	5	0	1	1	198	8	0	2.42	.919	—	—	—	—	—	—	—	—
AHL totals			89	44	31	8	4,911	216	4	2.64	.908	1	0	1	59	3	0	3.07	.842

== Awards ==
- 2002-03 J20 SuperElit SM-silver Medal
- 2003-04 Finland2 (Mestis) Rookie of the Year
- 2005-06 Jari Kurri trophy - awarded to the best player in the Finnish SM-liiga playoffs.
- 2005-06 SM-liiga Champion

Awards and achievements
Preceded by Niklas Bäckström	Winner of the Jari Kurri trophy 2005-06	Succeeded by Janne Pesonen
