= Urpo Ylönen trophy =

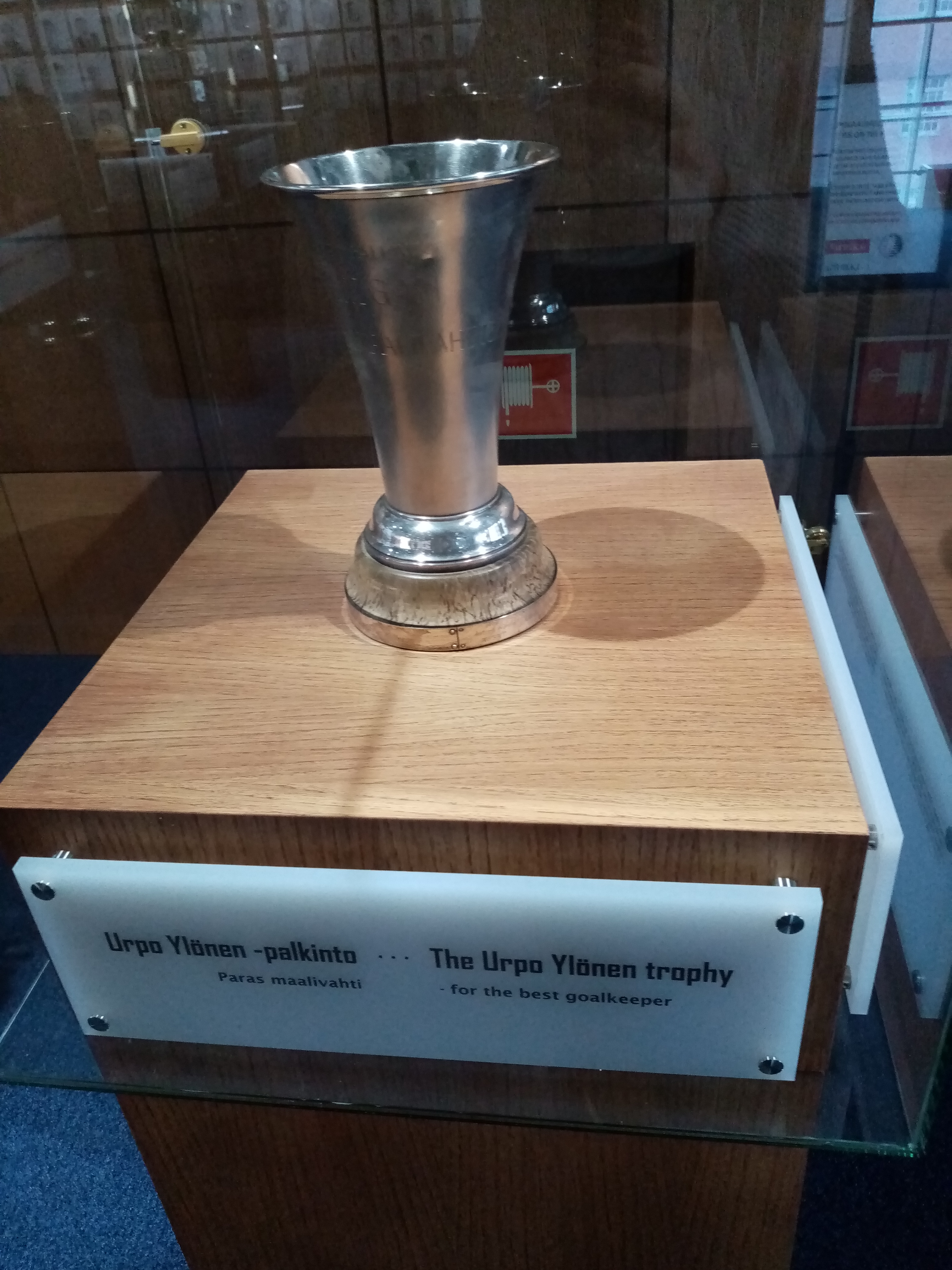
Urpo Ylönen trophy

The Urpo Ylönen trophy is an ice hockey award given by the Finnish Liiga to the best goalie of the season. It is named for Urpo Ylönen, former goaltender and later goaltender coach. In 2019 it was awarded to Veini Vehviläinen of Kärpät.

Trophy winners:

1977-78: Antero Kivelä (Ässät)

1978-79: Jorma Valtonen (TPS)

1979-80: Jorma Valtonen (TPS)

1980-81: Hannu Kamppuri (Tappara)

1981-82: Hannu Kamppuri (Tappara)

1982-83: Rauli Sohlman (Jokerit)

1983-84: Hannu Kamppuri (Tappara)

1984-85: Kari Takko (Ässät)

1985-86: Markus Mattsson (Tappara)

1986-87: Hannu Kamppuri (Kärpät)

1987-88: Jarmo Myllys (Lukko)

1988-89: Timo Lehkonen (TPS)

1989-90: Jukka Tammi (Ilves)

1990-91: Markus Ketterer (Jokerit)

1991-92: Petr Bříza (Lukko)

1992-93: Timo Lehkonen (HPK)

1993-94: Kari Takko (Ässät)

1994-95: Boris Rousson (Lukko)

1995-96: Ari Sulander (Jokerit)

1996-97: Jani Hurme (TPS)

1997-98: Tim Thomas (HIFK)

1998-99: Miikka Kiprusoff (TPS)

1999-00: Pasi Nurminen (Jokerit)

2000-01: Jussi Markkanen (Tappara)

2001-02: Kari Lehtonen (Jokerit)

2002-03: Kari Lehtonen (Jokerit)

2003-04: Niklas Bäckström (Kärpät)

2004-05: Niklas Bäckström (Kärpät)

2005-06: Juuso Riksman (Ässät)

2006-07: Tuomas Tarkki (Kärpät)

2007-08: Tuomas Tarkki (Kärpät)

2008-09: Juuso Riksman (Jokerit)

2009-10: Atte Engren (TPS)

2010-11: Juuso Riksman (HIFK)

2011-12: Riku Helenius (JYP)

2012-13: Antti Raanta (Ässät)

2013-14: Jussi Markkanen (SaiPa)

2014-15: Juha Metsola (Tappara)

2015-16: Ville Husso (HIFK)

2016-17: Eero Kilpeläinen (KalPa)

2017-18: Veini Vehviläinen (Kärpät)

2018-19: Veini Vehviläinen (Kärpät)

2019-20: Lukáš Dostál (Ilves)

2020-21: Lassi Lehtinen (Lukko)

2021-22: Christian Heljanko (Tappara)

2022-23: Christian Heljanko (Tappara)

2023-24: Christian Heljanko (Tappara)

2024-25: Niklas Rubin (Ässät)

2025-26: Eetu Randelin (KooKoo)
