= Ari Sulander =

Finnish ice hockey player

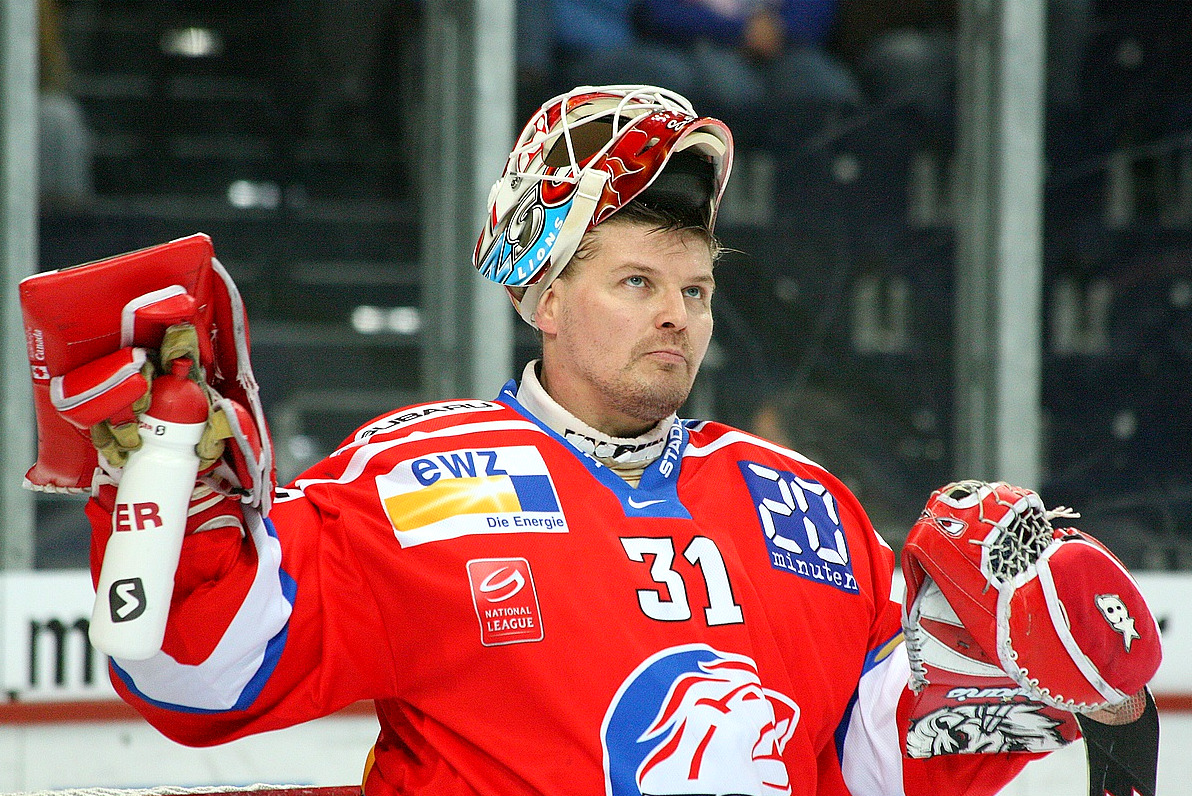
- Born: 6 January 1969 (age 57) Helsinki, Finland
- Height: 6 ft 2 in (188 cm)
- Weight: 216 lb (98 kg; 15 st 6 lb)
- Position: Goaltender
- Caught: Left
- Played for: Jokerit Helsinki; ZSC Lions; GCK Lions; Lahti Pelicans
- National team: Finland
- Playing career: 1987–2012

Ari Juhani Sulander (born 6 January 1969), nicknamed Sulo, is a Swiss-Finnish retired professional ice hockey goaltender.

== Career in Finland ==
Sulander played nine seasons for Jokerit Helsinki in Finland's SM-liiga, winning four league championships (1992, 1994, 1996, 1997). He also won one Silver (1995), one Bronze (1998), two European Championships (1995 and 1996) and one European Championship Bronze (93).

Sulander began with Jokerit as a Junior and progressed through the team all the way to position of No. 1 goaltender. During his Jokerit career, he played with SM-liiga stars such as Otakar Janecký, Teemu Selänne, Waltteri Immonen, and Jari Kurri, who played for Jokerit during the 1994–95 NHL lockout. In his time there, Sulander was coached by top coaches like Hannu Aravirta, Boris Mayorov, and Jukka Ropponen.

In November 2010, Sulander joined the Lahti Pelicans on loan for six games.

== Career in Switzerland ==
Sulander left Jokerit after winning Bronze in 1998 for a new challenge. Sulander played the final 14 years of his career with the ZSC Lions (Zürich) of the Swiss top League, the Nationalliga A. Sulander scored a goal during a Nationalliga A game in the 2002–03 season.

Sulander won the NLA championship with ZSC four times (2000, 2001, 2008, 2012) and the Champions Hockey League in 2008–09.

In 2011, Sulander received his Swiss citizenship.

== International career ==
Medal record

Representing Finland

Men's Ice hockey

Olympic Games
Bronze medal – third place	Nagano 1998	

World Championships
Gold medal – first place	1995 Sweden	
Silver medal – second place	1998 Switzerland	
Silver medal – second place	1999 Norway	
Bronze medal – third place	2000 Russia	

Ari Sulander played for a total of 117 games for the Finnish national team (dressed in 117, played 68). He played in the 1993, 1995, 1996, 1997, 1998, 1999, and 2000 Ice Hockey World Championships and the 1998 Winter Olympic Games.

In the World Championships Sulander won one Gold, two Silver, and one bronze medals. Sulander also won the Bronze in the 1998 Winter Olympics and was a key player in the Bronze game against NHL star powered Canada, led by Wayne Gretzky and Patrick Roy. Besides the 1998 Olympic tournament, Sulander also played well in the 1998 Ice Hockey World Championships.

Preceded by first winner	Winner of the Jari Kurri trophy 1993–94	Succeeded by Saku Koivu
Preceded by Boris Rousson	Winner of the Urpo Ylönen trophy 1995–96	Succeeded by Jani Hurme
