= Hannu Kamppuri =

Finnish ice hockey player (b. 1957)

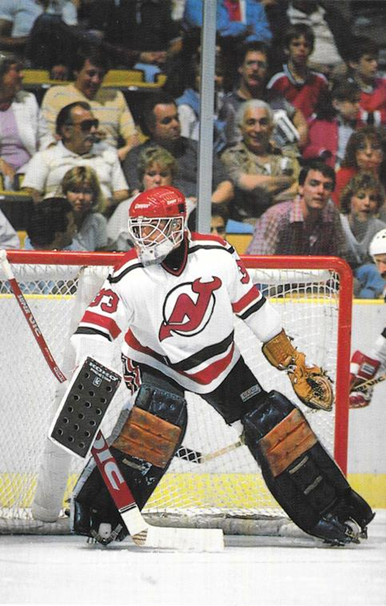
- Kamppuri in action for New Jersey Devils in 1984
- Born: 1 July 1957 (age 68) Helsinki, Finland
- Height: 6 ft 0 in (183 cm)
- Weight: 172 lb (78 kg; 12 st 4 lb)
- Position: Goaltender
- Caught: Left
- Played for: KooKoo; Kärpät; SaiPa; New Jersey Devils; Tappara; Edmonton Oilers; Jokerit; Karhu-Kissat
- National team: Finland
- NHL draft: Undrafted
- WHA draft: Undrafted
- Playing career: 1975–1990

Medal record

Representing Finland

Ice hockey

European Championship
Bronze medal – third place	1986 Soviet Union	
Bronze medal – third place	1987 Austria	

Hannu Juhani Kamppuri (born 1 July 1957) is a former professional ice hockey goaltender. Kamppuri, who was born in Helsinki, was an accomplished SM-liiga goaltender, who played from 1975 to 1990, and was one of the first Finnish goaltenders to compete in the National Hockey League, where he played 13 games for the New Jersey Devils during the 1984–85 season. He also appeared in net for the Edmonton Oilers of the World Hockey Association for 2 games during the 1978–79 season.

Much of his career was in the SM-liiga, with some time spent on teams in the minor professional leagues (AHL, CHL, IHL) in North America.

Kamppuri also played with the Finland men's national ice hockey team, competing at Ice Hockey World Championships and earning bronze medals at the 1986 and 1987 European Championships. He is a member of the Finnish Hockey Hall of Fame, being inducted in 1998.

== Career statistics ==
=== Regular season and playoffs ===
			Regular season									Playoffs
Season	Team	League	GP	W	L	T	MIN	GA	SO	GAA	SV%	GP	W	L	MIN	GA	SO	GAA	SV%
1973–74	Karhu-Kissat	FIN	2	—	—	—	—	—	—	—	.789	—	—	—	—	—	—	—	—
1974–75	Jokerit U20	FIN-U20	12	—	—	—	—	—	—	—	—	—	—	—	—	—	—	—	—
1975–76	Jokerit	FIN	12	—	—	—	—	51	1	—	.861	—	—	—	—	—	—	—	—
1976–77	Jokerit	FIN	32	—	—	—	—	122	0	—	.886	—	—	—	—	—	—	—	—
1977–78	Jokerit	FIN	36	7	26	3	2160	177	1	4.92	.878	—	—	—	—	—	—	—	—
1978–79	Jokerit	FIN	36	—	—	—	—	161	—	—	.882	—	—	—	—	—	—	—	—
1978–79	Edmonton Oilers	WHA	2	0	1	0	90	10	0	6.67	.792	—	—	—	—	—	—	—	—
1979–80	Houston Apollos	CHL	19	6	11	2	1119	88	0	4.72	.853	2	—	—	103	9	0	5.24	—
1979–80	Baltimore Clippers	EHL	3	—	—	—	—	4	1	—	—	—	—	—	—	—	—	—	—
1980–81	Tappara	FIN	33	—	—	—	—	102	—	3.12	.906	8	—	—	—	—	—	—	—
1981–82	Tappara	FIN	36	—	—	—	—	121	—	3.36	.904	11	—	—	—	—	—	—	—
1982–83	Tappara	FIN	35	—	—	—	—	132	1	3.78	.895	8	—	—	477	37	1	4.65	—
1983–84	Tappara	FIN	37	—	—	—	—	118	1	3.20	.909	9	—	—	—	26	0	—	—
1984–85	New Jersey Devils	NHL	13	1	10	1	634	54	0	5.11	.845	—	—	—	—	—	—	—	—
1984–85	Maine Mariners	AHL	7	4	2	0	340	19	0	3.35	.886	—	—	—	—	—	—	—	—
1984–85	Fort Wayne Komets	IHL	1	0	1	0	60	4	0	4.00	—	—	—	—	—	—	—	—	—
1985–86	SaiPa	FIN	34	—	—	—	—	140	—	—	.891	—	—	—	—	—	—	—	—
1986–87	Kärpät	FIN	44	25	15	4	2666	160	2	3.60	.906	9	4	5	556	37	0	3.99	—
1987–88	Kärpät	FIN	43	—	—	—	—	158	3	—	.876	—	—	—	—	—	—	—	—
1988–89	KooKoo	FIN	41	15	22	4	2403	171	0	4.27	.893	—	—	—	—	—	—	—	—
1989–90	KooKoo	FIN	42	10	28	4	2402	193	0	4.82	.876	4	1	3	219	20	0	5.48	—
WHA totals			2	0	1	0	90	10	0	6.67	.792	—	—	—	—	—	—	—	—
NHL totals			13	1	10	1	634	54	0	5.11	.845	—	—	—	—	—	—	—	—

=== International ===
Year	Team	Event	GP	W	L	T	MIN	GA	SO	GAA	SV%
1976	Finland	WJC	3	—	—	—	140	10	—	4.28	.846
1977	Finland	WJC	7	—	—	—	420	29	—	4.14	—
1981	Finland	WC	5	—	—	—	264	15	—	3.41	.889
1982	Finland	WC	6	3	2	1	355	20	0	3.38	.904
1983	Finland	WC	4	—	—	—	240	15	—	3.75	.937
1986	Finland	WC	5	—	—	—	299	16	0	3.21	.880
1987	Finland	WC	3	—	—	—	135	7	0	3.11	.841
Junior totals			10	—	—	—	560	39	—	4.18	—
Senior totals			23	—	—	—	1293	73	—	3.39	—

== Awards ==
- (gold) SM-liiga, Kanada-malja (2): 1982, 1984
- (silver) SM-liiga, (2): 1981, 1987
- (bronze) European Championship, (2): 1986, 1987
- Urpo Ylönen trophy (best goaltender, SM-liiga) (4): (1981, 1982, 1984, 1987)
- SM-liiga Lynces Academici Goalie Award (6): (1981, 1982, 1983, 1984, 1987, 1989
- First Team All-Star (SM-liiga) (6): (1978, 1979, 1981, 1983, 1984, 1987)
