= Markus Ketterer =

Finnish ice hockey player

Markus Jari Ketterer
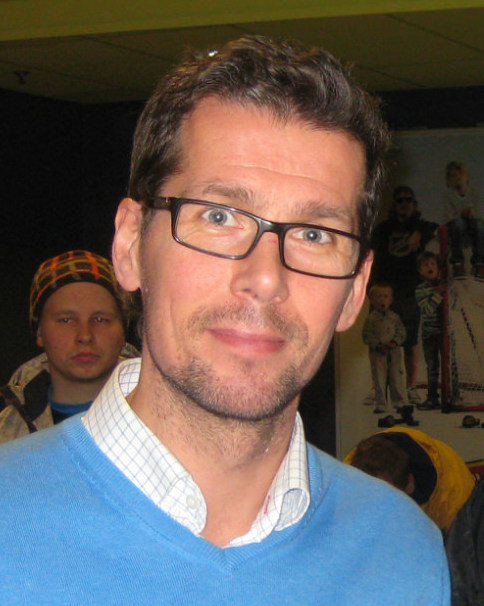
- Markus Ketterer during Jokerit's Christmas sale at Hartwall Arena in December 2013.
- Born: 23 August 1967 (age 58) Helsinki, Finland
- Height: 5 ft 11 in (180 cm)
- Weight: 185 lb (84 kg; 13 st 3 lb)
- Position: Goaltender
- Caught: Left
- Played for: Jokerit; TPS; Rochester Americans; Färjestad BK
- National team: Finland
- NHL draft: 107th overall, 1992; Buffalo Sabres
- Playing career: 1985–1999

Markus Jari Ketterer (born 23 August 1967 in Helsinki, Finland) is a retired professional ice hockey player who played in the SM-liiga and also the Swedish Elitserien as a goaltender. He played for Jokerit, TPS as Färjestads BK, the latter of which won the Swedish national championship during the season of 1996–1997. He was inducted into the Finnish Hockey Hall of Fame in 2005.

== Career ==
Markus Ketterer started his career as an ice hockey player in his hometown in the youth department of Jokerit Helsinki. From the 1985/86 season, he was a substitute goalkeeper for the professional team of Jokerit in the SM-liiga, but was initially not used. After the team had to accept relegation to the second-class I division, he played regularly in professional ice hockey for the first time in the 1987/88 season. With a catch rate of 90.7 percent, he was able to win in the second division and was committed by the SM-liiga participant to TPS Turku. With this, he won in his first three seasons as the regular goalkeeper in the highest Finnish division, the Finnish championship title. He was able to stage himself, particularly in the 1990/91 season and won the Urpo Ylönen trophy as the league's best goalkeeper. At European level, he and his team took second place in 1990 in the European Cup.

For the season 1991/92 Ketterer returned to Jokerit Helsinki, which had meanwhile returned to the SM-liiga. With Jokerit, he became champion straight away, which meant the goalkeeper's fourth league title in a row. Subsequently, teams in North America became aware of him during the 1991 Canada Cup when he stopped 42 shots against Team Canada nearly stealing the game. After the summer tournament he was selected in the 1992 NHL entry draft in the fifth round as a total of 107 players from the Buffalo Sabres. At first, however, the international remained with Jokerit and in 1993 took third place in the European Cup with his team. He then went to the United States, but from 1993 to 1995 stood exclusively for Buffalo's Farm team, the Rochester Americans, in the American Hockey League between the posts, so that he was with Färjestad BK in the Swedish Elitserien. With the FBK he was in the season 1996/97 Swedish champion. In the European Hockey League, however, he and his team were eliminated in the group phase. From 1997 to 1999 the 1992 Olympian played again for his home club Jokerit in the SM-liiga before he ended his career at the age of 31. In 2005 he was inducted into the Finnish Hockey Hall of Fame as a total of 160 players.

=== International ===
For Finland, Ketterer only participated in the Junior World Championship 1987. In this, he led his team to win the gold medal and he was recognized as the best goalkeeper of the tournament. In the senior sector, he was in his country's squad at the World Championships 1989, 1990, 1991, 1992, 1993, and 1996 and at the Olympic Winter Games 1992 in Albertville. At the 1991 World Cup, he was named the best goalkeeper of the tournament, at the World Cup a year later he was runner-up with Finland and he was elected to the World All-Star Team. In addition, he represented the senior team at the 1991 Canada Cup, and 1996 at the World Cup of Hockey, where he remained without a substitute goalkeeper for the latter.
