= Boris Rousson =

Canadian ice hockey player

- Born: June 14, 1970 (age 55) Val-d'Or, Quebec, Canada
- Height: 6 ft 2 in (188 cm)
- Weight: 194 lb (88 kg; 13 st 12 lb)
- Position: Goaltender
- Caught: Left
- Played for: AHL; Binghamton Rangers; Europe; Lukko (SM-liiga); Färjestad BK (Elitserien); Kölner Haie (DEL); Munich Barons (DEL); Hamburg Freezers (DEL); Kassel Huskies (DEL)
- National team: Canada
- NHL draft: Undrafted
- Playing career: 1991–2009

Boris Rousson (born June 14, 1970) is a Canadian former professional ice hockey goaltender. Since 2009 he has been an ice hockey coach. Rousson is currently the head coach of the Hamburger SV U16 in the German Schüler-Bundesliga (Students National League).

In 1992–93, his second professional season, Rousson played for the Binghamton Rangers, New York's AHL affiliate. The team posted the league's lowest goals-against average at 2.79 to win the Harry "Hap" Holmes Memorial Award for the lowest goals-against-average (shared with goaltending teammate Corey Hirsch).

== Team Canada ==
Rousson was a member of Team Canada at the 1994 Spengler Cup and at the 2003 Deutschland Cup.

== Awards and honours ==
Award	Year
Harry "Hap" Holmes Memorial Award – AHL Best Team GGA	1992–93
SM-liiga All-Star Team	1994–95
Urpo Ylönen trophy - SM-liiga Best Goaltender	1994–95
