= Jussi Markkanen =

Finnish ice hockey player, executive (born 1975)

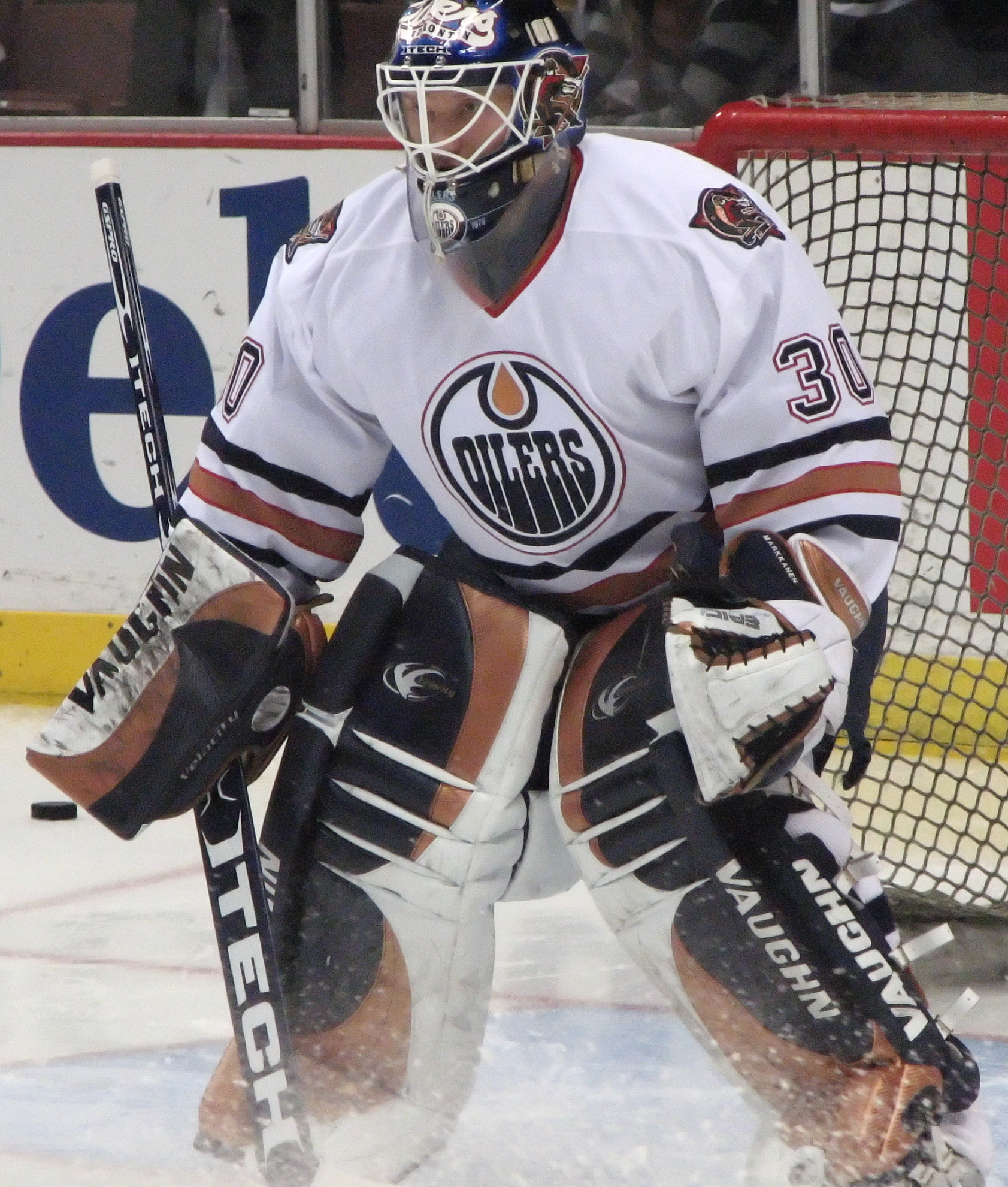
- Markkanen with the Edmonton Oilers in 2007
- Born: 8 May 1975 (age 51) Imatra, Finland
- Height: 6 ft 0 in (183 cm)
- Weight: 182 lb (83 kg; 13 st 0 lb)
- Position: Goaltender
- Caught: Left
- Played for: SaiPa; Tappara; Edmonton Oilers; New York Rangers; Lada Togliatti; Jokerit; HC CSKA Moscow; EV Zug
- National team: Finland
- NHL draft: 133rd overall, 2001; Edmonton Oilers
- Playing career: 2001–2018

Jussi Markkanen (born 8 May 1975) is a Finnish professional ice hockey executive and former goaltender. He is currently serving as general manager of SaiPa. Markkanen played extensively in various European professional leagues as well as the National Hockey League (NHL). He was selected in the fifth round of the 2001 NHL entry draft, 133rd overall, by the Edmonton Oilers, as an over-aged entrant.

== Playing career ==
Markkanen played most of his NHL career in Edmonton, except for a single season stint with the New York Rangers. During the 2004–05 NHL lockout, Markkanen played in the Russian Super League, where he posted a dominant 31–9–9 record. In July 2007, Jokerit agreed to a one-year contract with Markkanen for the next SM-liiga season.

After an injury to Oilers starter Dwayne Roloson, Markkanen was selected by coach Craig MacTavish to finish the 2006 Stanley Cup finals as Edmonton's number one goaltender. He started Game 2 of the series and never left the net until the end. Markkanen won the first Stanley Cup game of his career in Game 3 of the Finals against the Carolina Hurricanes on 10 June 2006, a game in which he earned the first star of the game. In Game 5 of the final, Markkanen and the Oilers beat Carolina 4–3 in overtime thanks to Fernando Pisani's short-handed breakaway goal. In Game 6, Markkanen stopped all 16 Hurricane shots for his first career playoff shutout. Carolina won the deciding Game 7, as Markkanen gave up two goals and the Hurricanes later secured the win with an empty net goal, defeating Edmonton 3–1 to win the Stanley Cup.

=== Post NHL ===
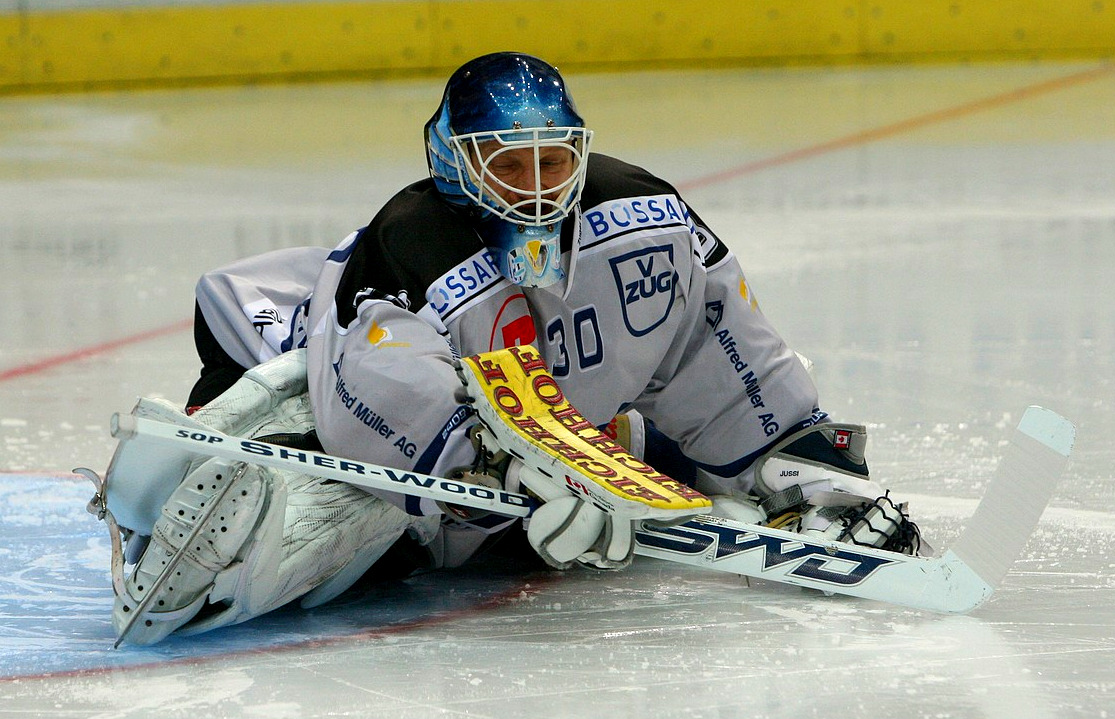
Jussi Markkanen in 2010 with EV Zug

After the great season in Edmonton, Markkanen did not regain the same form in the following season and after the 2006–07 NHL season, Markkanen was out of contract.

Markkanen was contracted by Finnish top-runners Jokerit, who replaced Scott Langkow with Markkanen. Markkanen's move was a bit controversial because he owns a part of SaiPa, which also plays in the Finnish SM-liiga with Jokerit.

Markkanen played well in the 2007–08 regular season, placing himself among the top goaltenders in the league. Markkanen however sustained a heavy injury during his first playoff game and missed the remainder of the playoffs.

After the end of the season, it was announced that Markkanen would return to the Russian Super League, where he played during the 2004–05 lockout-season for Lada Togliatti. Markkanen's new club was the famous Russian side CSKA Moscow, where he made 25 appearances during the 2008-09 campaign. He left on 7 April 2009 and signed with EV Zug of the Swiss Nationalliga A. His first Zug stint ended at the conclusion of the 2012–13 season, when he opted to return to his native Finland.

From 2013 to February 2017, he played for SaiPa of the Finnish Liiga. In the 2013–14 season, he was presented with the Urpo Ylönen Trophy as the Liiga Goaltender of the Year. When his former club EV Zug came calling in February 2017, he signed with the Swiss team for the remainder of the 2016–17 season.

== Personal ==
He is married to his wife, Sanna. Their family suffered a tragedy on 23 September 2008 in Moscow, as one of their two sons, Olli-Matias, died after falling out of a fifth-story window while playing in the living room with his older brother, Juho. He was 4 years of age.

== Career statistics ==
=== Regular season and playoffs ===
			Regular season										Playoffs
Season	Team	League	GP	W	L	T	OTL	MIN	GA	SO	GAA	SV%	GP	W	L	MIN	GA	SO	GAA	SV%
1991–92	SaiPa	FIN.2 U20	6	3	3	0	—	360	25	0	4.17	—	2	—	—	120	11	0	5.50	.784
1992–93	SaiPa	FIN.2	16	6	6	2	—	798	60	0	4.51	.842	—	—	—	—	—	—	—	—
1992–93	SaiPa	FIN.2 U20	—	—	—	—	—	—	—	—	—	—	7	—	—	367	28	0	4.58	.856
1993–94	SaiPa	FIN.2 U20	—	—	—	—	—	—	—	—	—	—	—	—	—	—	—	—	—	—
1993–94	SaiPa	FIN.2	24	—	—	—	—	—	—	—	3.48	.887	6	—	—	—	—	—	2.93	.887
1994–95	SaiPa	FIN.2	36	—	—	—	—	—	—	—	2.76	.914	10	6	4	621	33	0	3.19	—
1995–96	Tappara	SM-l	23	11	8	2	—	1238	59	1	2.86	.901	—	—	—	—	—	—	—	—
1995–96	Tappara	FIN.2 U20	—	—	—	—	—	—	—	—	—	—	5	—	—	298	21	0	4.23	.844
1996–97	SaiPa	SM-l	41	9	24	7	—	2340	132	0	3.38	.895	—	—	—	—	—	—	—	—
1997–98	SaiPa	SM-l	48	21	20	5	—	2870	138	4	2.88	.905	3	0	3	164	11	0	4.02	.878
1998–99	SaiPa	SM-l	48	21	19	4	—	2633	105	4	2.39	.917	7	3	3	366	21	0	3.44	.878
1999–00	SaiPa	SM-l	48	4	23	9	—	2794	150	2	3.24	.905	—	—	—	—	—	—	—	—
2000–01	Tappara	SM-l	52	30	17	5	—	3076	107	9	2.09	.923	10	7	3	608	18	1	1.78	.933
2001–02	Hamilton Bulldogs	AHL	4	2	2	0	—	239	9	0	2.26	.921	—	—	—	—	—	—	—	—
2001–02	Edmonton Oilers	NHL	14	6	4	2	—	784	24	2	1.84	.929	—	—	—	—	—	—	—	—
2002–03	Edmonton Oilers	NHL	22	7	8	3	—	1180	51	3	2.59	.904	1	0	0	14	1	0	4.28	.917
2003–04	New York Rangers	NHL	26	8	12	1	—	1244	53	2	2.56	.913	—	—	—	—	—	—	—	—
2003–04	Edmonton Oilers	NHL	7	2	2	2	—	394	12	0	1.83	.934	—	—	—	—	—	—	—	—
2004–05	Lada Togliatti	RSL	54	31	9	9	—	3157	63	11	1.20	.941	10	—	—	627	15	1	1.44	.938
2005–06	Edmonton Oilers	NHL	37	15	12	—	6	2016	105	0	3.12	.880	6	3	3	360	13	1	2.17	.905
2006–07	Edmonton Oilers	NHL	22	5	9	—	1	992	52	0	3.14	.886	—	—	—	—	—	—	—	—
2007–08	Jokerit	SM-l	50	26	11	—	12	2939	114	4	2.33	.925	1	0	0	20	1	0	3.00	.888
2008–09	CSKA Moscow	KHL	18	10	6	—	2	981	38	1	2.32	.903	7	3	2	379	11	0	1.74	.934
2009–10	EV Zug	NLA	47	30	17	—	—	2841	115	6	2.43	.927	13	6	7	781	51	0	3.92	.895
2010–11	EV Zug	NLA	39	24	14	—	—	2304	103	3	2.68	.916	10	4	6	633	37	0	3.51	.888
2011–12	EV Zug	NLA	43	28	15	—	—	2641	105	3	2.38	.924	9	4	5	546	29	0	3.18	.887
2012–13	EV Zug	NLA	26	17	9	—	—	1509	72	1	2.86	.910	12	6	6	725	29	1	2.40	.921
2013–14	SaiPa	Liiga	47	21	12	—	9	2686	91	5	2.03	.926	12	5	7	710	29	1	2.45	.908
2014–15	SaiPa	Liiga	47	19	16	—	11	2733	91	6	2.00	.915	3	2	1	181	5	1	1.66	.950
2015–16	SaiPa	Liiga	35	18	8	—	8	2082	68	3	1.96	.921	—	—	—	—	—	—	—	—
2016–17	SaiPa	Liiga	26	8	12	—	5	1494	69	1	2.77	.898	—	—	—	—	—	—	—	—
2016–17	EV Zug	NLA	1	—	—	—	—	—	—	—	5.12	.808	—	—	—	—	—	—	—	—
2017–18	SaiPa	Liiga	9	2	4	—	2	480	29	1	3.63	.865	—	—	—	—	—	—	—	—
NLA totals			156	99	55	—	—	9295	395	13	2.55	—	44	20	24	2685	146	1	3.26	—
SM-l/Liiga totals			474	190	174	32	47	27,365	1153	40	2.53	—	36	17	17	2049	85	3	2.49	—
NHL totals			128	43	47	8	7	6610	297	7	2.70	.901	7	3	3	374	14	1	2.24	.906

=== International ===
Year	Team	Event	GP	W	L	T	MIN	GA	SO	GAA	SV%
1994	Finland	WJC	3				180	9		3.00	.860
1995	Finland	WJC	5	2	2	1	296	18	0	3.65	.890
2002	Finland	OG	DNP	—	—	—	—	—	—	—	—
2002	Finland	WC	7	5	2	0	429	10	2	1.40	.937
2004	Finland	WC	1	1	0	0	60	1	0	1.00	.909
Senior totals			8	6	2	0	489	11	2	1.35	—

== Awards and honours ==
Award	Year	
SM-liiga Best Goaltender (Urpo Ylönen trophy)	2000-01	2013-14
SM-liiga All-star team	2000-01	2013-14

Preceded by Pasi Nurminen	Winner of the Urpo Ylönen trophy 2000–01	Succeeded by Kari Lehtonen
