= Miikka Kiprusoff =

Finnish ice hockey player (born 1976)

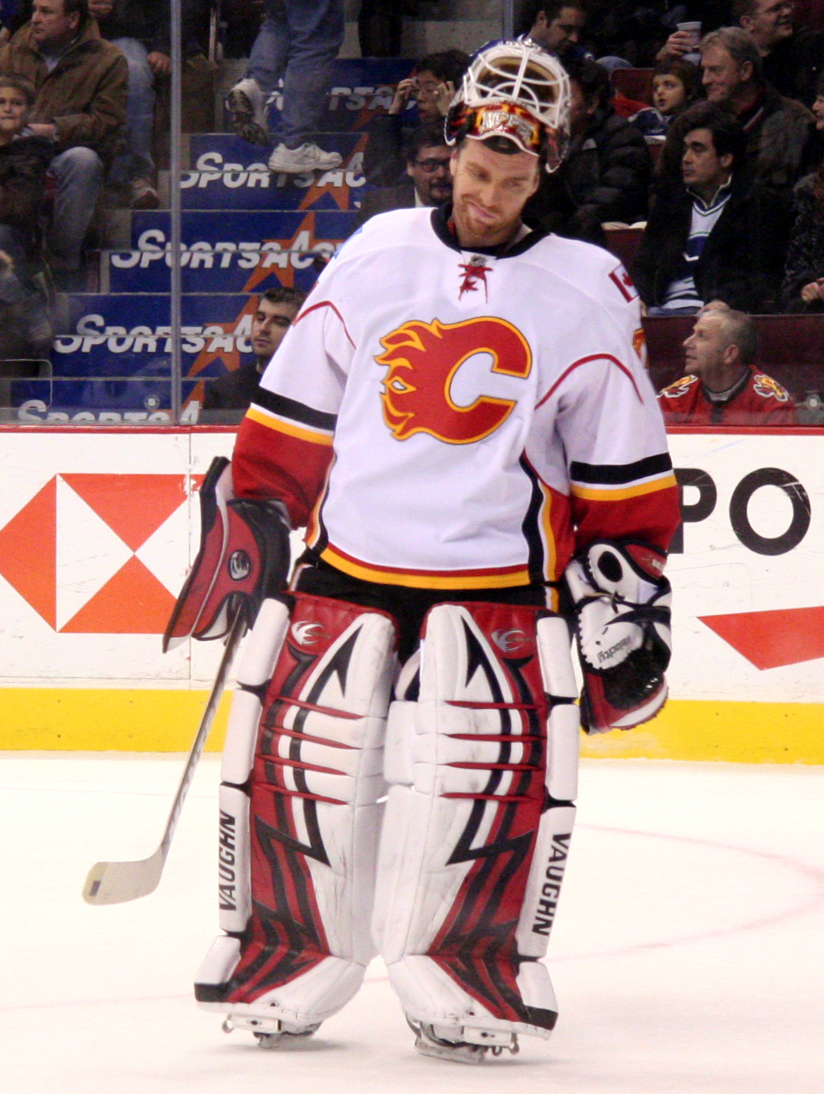
- Kiprusoff with the Calgary Flames in December 2007
- Born: October 26, 1976 (age 50) Turku, Finland
- Height: 6 ft 1 in (185 cm)
- Weight: 185 lb (84 kg; 13 st 3 lb)
- Position: Goaltender
- Caught: Left
- Played for: TPS; AIK; San Jose Sharks; Calgary Flames; Timrå IK
- National team: Finland
- NHL draft: 116th overall, 1995; San Jose Sharks
- Playing career: 1994–2013
Medal record
Representing Finland
Men's ice hockey
Olympic Games
Bronze medal – third place	2010 Vancouver
World Championship
Silver medal – second place	1999 Norway
Silver medal – second place	2001 Germany
World Cup of Hockey
Silver medal – second place	2004 Toronto

Miikka Sakari Kiprusoff (Finnish pronunciation: [ˈmiːkːɑ ˈsɑkɑri ˈkiprusofː]; born October 26, 1976), nicknamed "Kipper", is a Finnish former professional ice hockey player who was a goaltender in the National Hockey League (NHL) for the San Jose Sharks and Calgary Flames between 2000 and 2013. He was selected in the fifth round, 116th overall, by the Sharks in the 1995 NHL entry draft, and has also played professionally for TPS of the Finnish SM-liiga, as well as for both AIK IF and Timrå IK of the Swedish Elitserien.

Kiprusoff represented Finland several times on the international stage, earning silver medals at the Ice Hockey World Championships in 1999 and 2001, as well as leading the Finns to a surprise second-place finish at the 2004 World Cup of Hockey. He also helped the Finnish national team win the bronze medal at the 2010 Winter Olympics.

Kiprusoff began his professional career with TPS in 1994, and was named the best goaltender and best player of the playoffs in 1999 as he led them to the SM-liiga championship. He then moved to North America in 1999, and after two All-Star seasons in the American Hockey League (AHL), made his NHL debut with the San Jose Sharks, where he served primarily as the team's backup. A trade to the Calgary Flames in 2003–04 brought Kiprusoff into a starting role, and he set a modern NHL record for lowest goals against average (GAA) at 1.69 as he helped the Flames reach the 2004 Stanley Cup Finals. He won the Vezina Trophy as the best goaltender in the NHL in 2006 along with the William M. Jennings Trophy for giving up the fewest goals in the League. He played in his first NHL All-Star Game in 2007. Having won over 300 games after turning 27, he is the franchise record holder in both wins and shutouts for the Flames.

== Playing career ==
=== Europe ===
Kiprusoff was sponsored by his hometown team. TPS, playing two seasons in the Finnish junior league for them between 1993 and 1995. He was then selected by the San Jose Sharks in the fifth round, 116th overall, at the 1995 NHL entry draft, on July 8, 1995. He made his professional debut in 1994–95, and won three of four games played for TPS. After playing 12 games for TPS in 1995–96, he moved to AIK IF of the Swedish Elitserien, playing two seasons as their top goaltender before returning to TPS in 1998–99. He dominated the SM-liiga that year, finishing the season with a record of 26–6–6 and a GAA of 1.85, and led TPS to the Finnish championship. For his efforts, he was named the winner of the Urpo Ylönen trophy as the best goaltender in 1998–99 and the Jari Kurri trophy as the best player of the playoffs.

=== San Jose Sharks (2000–2003) ===
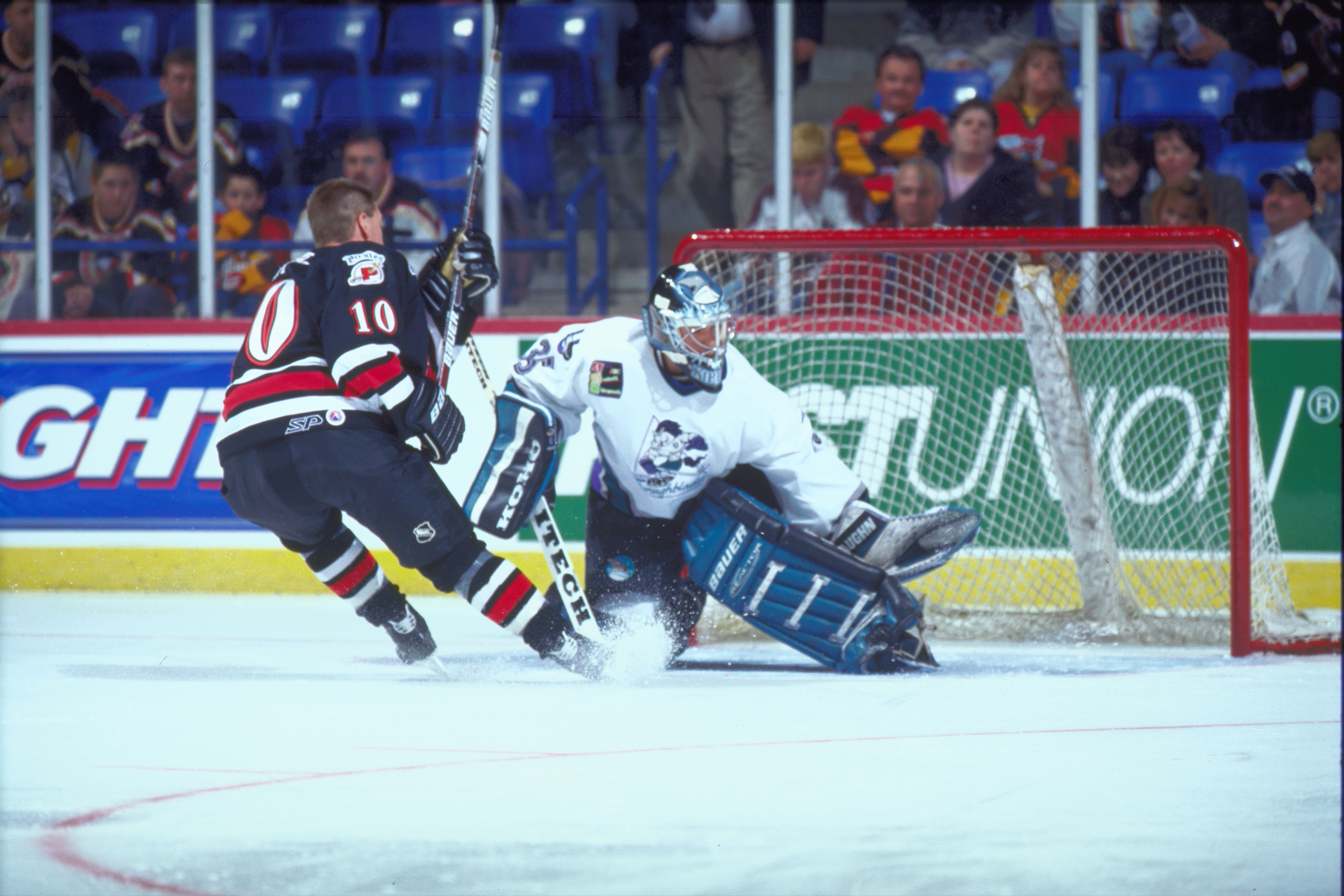
Kiprusoff in net for the Kentucky Thoroughblades at the beginning of his career

Kiprusoff moved to North America in 1999, joining the Sharks' AHL affiliate, the Kentucky Thoroughblades. He finished fourth in the League with a 2.48 GAA and was the starting goaltender for team PlanetUSA at the 2000 AHL All-Star Game as he helped Kentucky win its first division title. He began the 2000–01 season with Kentucky, where he posted a record of 19–9–6 with two shutouts in 39 games. He then started his second-consecutive AHL All-Star Game before earning a call-up to San Jose on March 5, 2001. He earned his first NHL win on March 29, 7–4 over the Mighty Ducks of Anaheim, in relief of starting goaltender Evgeni Nabokov. He made his first start on April 8, again against Anaheim, and earned his second win.

The flu sidelined Nabokov for Game 4 of the Sharks' 2001 Stanley Cup playoff series against the St. Louis Blues. Making just his second career start, Kiprusoff made 39 saves in a 3–2 victory. In doing so, he became the first Finnish born goaltender to win an NHL playoff game. Kiprusoff struggled to start the 2001–02 season, however, and was sent to the Cleveland Barons on a conditioning assignment after playing in only four of the Sharks' first 21 games. He was named the AHL Player of the Week during the assignment after winning all four games he played in Cleveland. He finished the season with a 7–6–3 record for the Sharks, and recorded his first NHL shutout in a 6–0 win over the Florida Panthers on January 5, 2002.

Nabokov entered the 2002–03 season as a holdout player without a contract, giving Kiprusoff a chance to become the starter. Despite the opportunity, Kiprusoff struggled, losing his first three games and posting a 5.65 GAA in that time, forcing the Sharks' hand, as they quickly agreed to terms with Nabokov on a new contract. Relegated to the backup role, Kiprusoff continued to struggle, winning just five of 22 games played before his season ended with a knee injury. Despite his poor season, the Sharks offered him a new contract for one year at US$800,000.

Kiprusoff began the 2003–04 season competing with Vesa Toskala for the backup spot behind Nabokov, leading to speculation of a trade. Ultimately relegated to third-string status, Kiprusoff grew increasingly frustrated, as he did not play in any games through the first quarter of the season. He was then finally traded to the Calgary Flames in exchange for a second-round draft pick on November 16, 2003, after Calgary starter Roman Turek suffered an injury.

=== Calgary Flames (2003–2013) ===
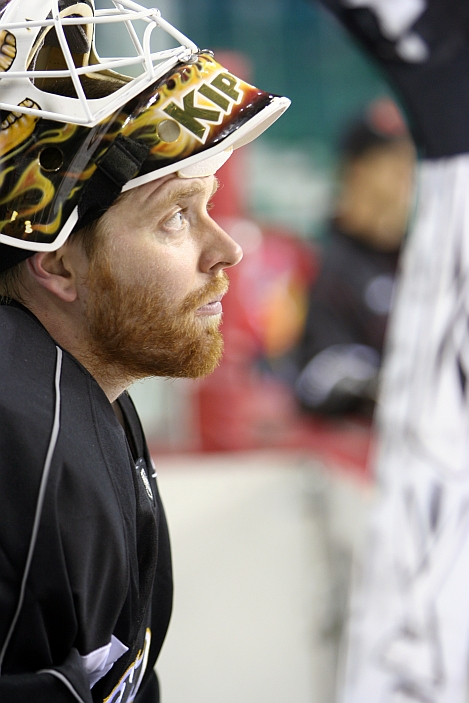
Kiprusoff in September 2005

The trade provided immediate dividends for the Flames, as Kiprusoff recorded 22 saves in a 2–1 victory over the Montreal Canadiens in his first game with Calgary on November 20. He won 12 of 17 starts between November 20 and December 29, giving up one goal or fewer 11 times in that stretch. He was named the defensive player of the month for December by the League, but suffered a sprained medial collateral ligament (MCL) in his knee at the end of the month that forced him out of the lineup for four weeks.

Kiprusoff's play remained strong upon his return, as he was counted on to lead the Flames to the playoffs for the first time in eight years. A 1–0 victory over the Phoenix Coyotes clinched a berth in the 2004 playoffs for the Flames, an achievement which earned Kiprusoff a standing ovation from the Calgary fans. He finished the regular season with a modern NHL record-low GAA of 1.69. His stellar play continued into the playoffs, as he won 15 games, five of them via shutout, leading the Flames to within one victory of a Stanley Cup championship. He was named a finalist for the Vezina Trophy, awarded to the best goaltender in the League, and was given a one-year, $2.95 million contract for 2004–05 by an arbitrator, an increase in salary of nearly four times his previous contract.

As the 2004–05 lockout led to the cancellation of the season, Kiprusoff chose to play in Sweden. He played 41 games for Timrå IK, recording five shutouts and a 2.14 GAA. He remained a top goaltender for Calgary when NHL play resumed in 2005–06, breaking Mike Vernon's franchise record when he recorded his 40th win of the season against the Minnesota Wild on April 8, 2006. He was not only touted as the top goaltender in the League, but also argued to be a candidate for the Hart Memorial Trophy as the most valuable player in the NHL. Finishing the season with a 42–20–11 record and a team-record 10 shutouts, he was named a first team all-star and awarded the Vezina Trophy, as well as the William M. Jennings Trophy for being the goaltender on the team that gave up the fewest goals in during the season. He was also named a finalist for the Hart, though the award was won by Joe Thornton.

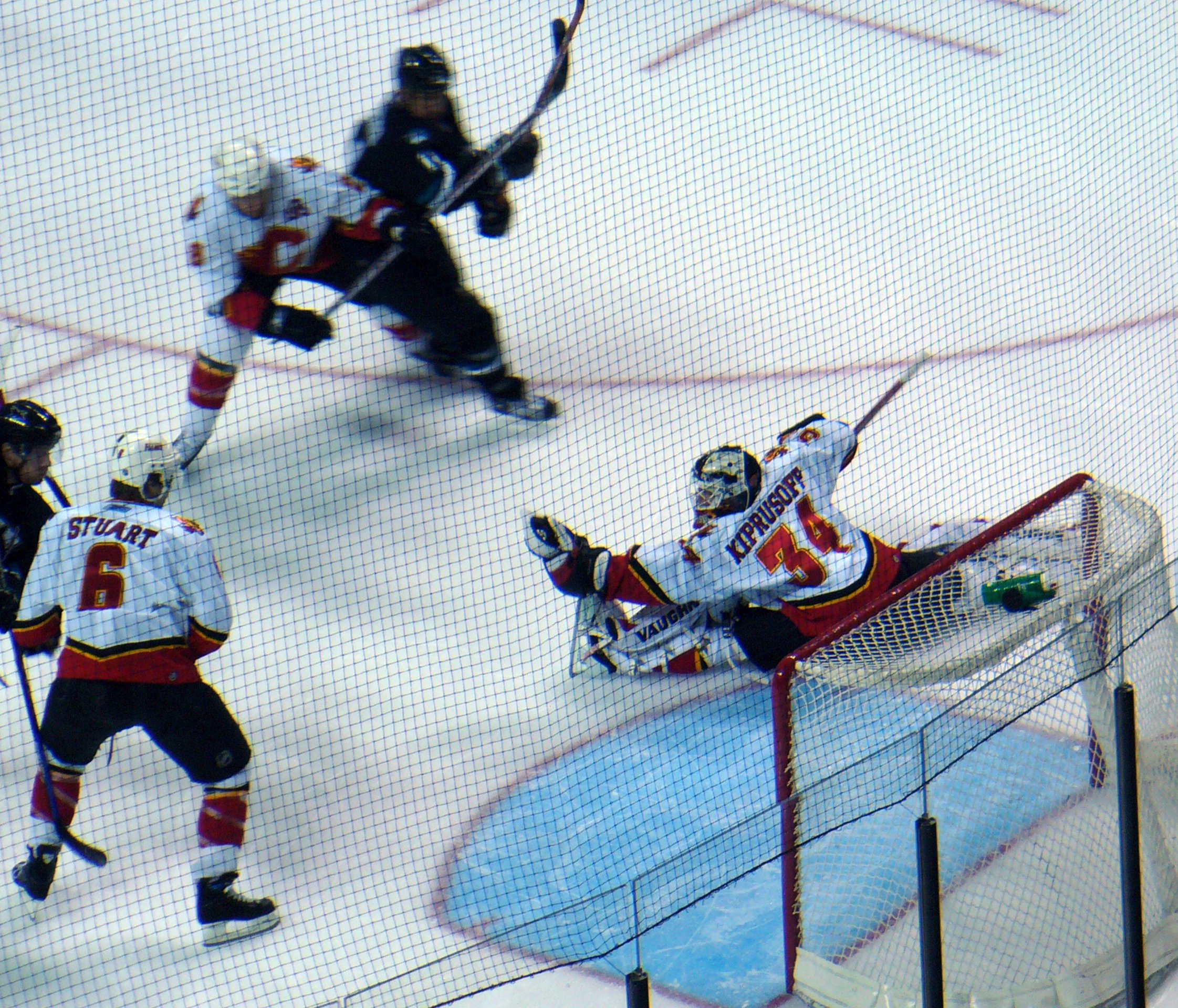
Kiprusoff making a save against the San Jose Sharks in April 2007.

Kiprusoff struggled to begin the 2006–07 season, winning just four of his first 12 decisions, and giving up nearly three goals per game. He rebounded to finish the season with 40 wins, won his 100th career game, and played in his first All-Star Game. He recorded his 21st shutout in a Flames uniform in a 1–0 win over the Wild on March 27, 2007, to break Dan Bouchard's franchise record. Kiprusoff was outstanding in the 2007 playoffs, keeping the overmatched Flames close to the top-seeded Detroit Red Wings despite the Flames giving up nearly 50 shots per game in their first two contests. He led them to consecutive wins in Games 3 and 4 to even the series, and gave the Flames hope they could win the series, but the Flames were unable to parlay his performance into a series win, losing the best-of-seven series 4–2. In Game 5, he was pulled after giving up five goals, but was forced to come back in only 18 seconds later when his backup, Jamie McLennan, was thrown out of the game for deliberately slashing the Red Wings' Johan Franzén. Kiprusoff earned his third consecutive nomination for the Vezina Trophy, ultimately won by Martin Brodeur.

Nicknamed "Captain Hook" for the way he handled goaltenders, the Flames decision to hire Mike Keenan as head coach in 2007–08 created speculation that Kiprusoff might choose to leave Calgary when his contract expired at the end of the season. Nonetheless, he agreed to a six-year extension worth $35 million that would keep him in Calgary until the end of the 2013–14 season. He struggled at times, as his GAA and save percentage fell outside of the top 30 goaltenders in the League by mid-November. His play improved throughout the season, however, and he finished the season third in the NHL with 39 wins.

Hoping to rebound in 2008–09, Kiprusoff arrived for the start of the season in better shape, but continued to struggle as he was questioned on whether his heavy workload the previous three seasons — he played 76, 74 and 74 games of a possible 82 — were taking a toll on him. He won his 200th career game on March 18, 2009, in a 2–1 victory over the Dallas Stars, but questions about whether he was playing too many games continued throughout the season. Although he led the League with 45 wins, his statistical averages had deteriorated for the fourth consecutive season as he admitted he struggled.

New head coach Brent Sutter promised that Kiprusoff would face a lighter schedule in 2009–10, he played 76 games in 2008–09, while Kiprusoff hired a personal trainer and set aside his previously indifferent attitude towards off-season training. His efforts appeared to pay dividends early in the season, as he lost only three of his first 17 decisions, leading his teammates to compare his early performance to his first years in Calgary. He finished in the top ten in the League in wins, save percentage and GAA and while considered a potential candidate for the Vezina Trophy, he was not named a finalist in part due to the fact the Flames failed to qualify for the 2010 playoffs.

Kiprusoff, as well as the entire Flames team, struggled early in the 2010–11 season, and during a period of struggle late in January, he became a target of the fans' jeering. He admitted that he had struggled and was trying to focus on returning his play to where he felt it should be. Kiprusoff's fortunes improved in February, as he won his 250th game as a member of the Flames in a 9–1 victory over the Colorado Avalanche on February 14. Six nights later, he became the first goaltender in NHL history to record a shutout in an outdoor game with a 4–0 victory over the Montreal Canadiens at the 2011 Heritage Classic. In a March 4 game against the Columbus Blue Jackets, he became the first goaltender in 25 years to stop two penalty shots in one game to preserve a 4–3 victory.

On February 8, 2012, Kiprusoff became the 27th goalie to record his 300th career win. He reached the mark with a 4–3 victory over his former team, the San Jose Sharks. A knee injury forced Kiprusoff out of Calgary's lineup for a month of the 2012–13 season, but a victory in his return — a 4–1 decision over the Sharks on March 6, 2013 — marked his 300th win as a member of the Flames.

At the 2013 NHL trade deadline, the Toronto Maple Leafs reportedly attempted to acquire Kiprusoff, but he elected not to waive his no-trade clause amid speculation that he intended to retire at season's end. Finnish news agency STT-Lehtikuva reported in June that the goaltender had informed the Finnish national team that he had decided to end his playing career, and the Flames formally announced his retirement on September 9, 2013. He ended his career as the Flames' franchise leader in wins (305), shutouts (41) and games played by a goaltender (576).

The Flames retired Kiprusoff's no. 34 on March 2, 2024, making him the fourth Flames player to receive the honour.

== International play ==
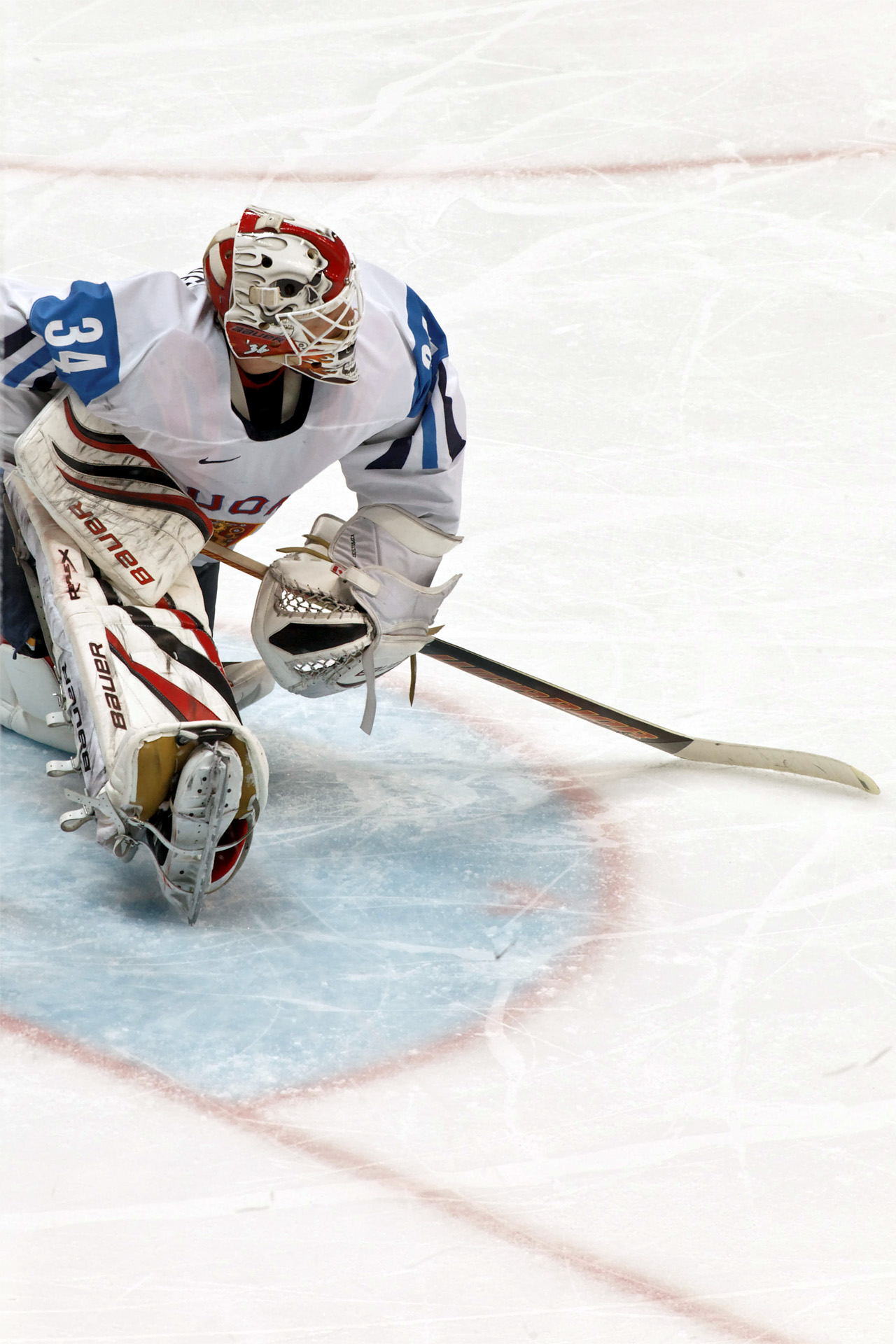
Kiprusoff backstopped Finland to a bronze medal at the 2010 Winter Olympics.

Kiprusoff made his international debut with the Finnish junior team at the 1994 European Junior Ice Hockey Championships, where he played in three games. He was also a member of the team at the 1995 and 1996 World Junior Ice Hockey Championships, where Finland finished fourth and sixth, respectively.

Kiprusoff first played with the senior team at the 1999 Men's World Ice Hockey Championships, where he recorded a 1.16 GAA in four games, only to lose the final in overtime. He rejoined the team for the 2001 tournament, again losing the final in overtime.

Kiprusoff was offered a spot on the Finnish team for the 2002 Winter Olympics, but declined citing a desire to focus on his professional career in North America. Kiprusoff was named the starting goaltender for the 2004 World Cup of Hockey, and earned a shutout against the Czech Republic. He posted four wins and a tie, including a second shutout, and a 1.18 GAA to lead the upstart Finns into the championship game against Canada. In spite of his 30 saves, the Finns were defeated by Canada 3–2. Kiprusoff did not play his best game in the final, according to Finland Head Coach Raimo Summanen, though he expressed pride in his team's effort.

Kiprusoff again declined an invitation to play at the 2006 Winter Olympics, citing the need to rest a hip injury. His announcement generated considerable controversy in Finland, where the fact that he did not miss a game with the Flames due to the injury led some to question if he was injured at all. Country-mate Teemu Selänne questioned the goaltender's lack of interest in playing for the national team, a comment that stung Kiprusoff. When considered to play for the Finns at the 2010 Winter Olympics in Vancouver, Kiprusoff said he would join the team, but only if he felt healthy and if he was named the starting goaltender for the team. Kiprusoff was named the starter and allowed only four goals in his team's first four games, leading the Finns to a semifinal game against the United States. The Americans blitzed Kiprusoff early in the game, as he gave up four goals on just seven shots in the first minutes of the game before being replaced in net by Niklas Bäckström. He returned to the net for the bronze medal game, however, leading Finland to a 5–3 victory.

== Personal life ==
Kiprusoff is of Russian descent through his grandfather. He and his wife Seidi have two sons, Aaro and Oskar, and call Helsinki home. His older brother, Marko, is a defenceman who last played for TPS in 2009, and previously played in the NHL with the Montreal Canadiens and New York Islanders.

Kiprusoff is a spokesman for the Rainbow Society of Alberta, an organization that aims to grant wishes for children with chronic or life-threatening conditions. He donated $10 for each save he made in an NHL game, which totalled $18,720 in 2009–10.

== Career statistics ==
=== Regular season and playoffs ===
			Regular season										Playoffs
Season	Team	League	GP	W	L	T	OTL	MIN	GA	SO	GAA	SV%	GP	W	L	MIN	GA	SO	GAA	SV%
1993–94	TPS	FIN U20	35	20	9	5	—	2,101	100	0	2.85	.910	6	3	3	369	26	0	4.23	.874
1994–95	TPS	FIN U20	31	13	14	4	—	1,896	92	2	2.91	.924	—	—	—	—	—	—	—	—
1994–95	TPS	SM-l	4	3	1	0	—	240	12	0	3.00	.897	2	2	0	120	7	0	3.50	.896
1994–95	Kiekko–67	FIN-2	1	0	1	0	—	60	6	0	6.00	.846	—	—	—	—	—	—	—	—
1995–96	TPS	FIN U20	3	1	2	0	—	180	9	0	3.00	.927	—	—	—	—	—	—	—	—
1995–96	TPS	SM-l	12	5	3	1	—	550	38	0	4.14	.881	3	0	1	113	4	0	2.12	—
1995–96	Kiekko–67	FIN-2	5	5	0	0	—	300	7	1	1.40	.950	—	—	—	—	—	—	—	—
1996–97	AIK	SEL	42	—	—	—	—	2,440	93	3	2.29	.907	7	—	—	420	22	0	3.14	—
1997–98	AIK	SEL	43	—	—	—	—	2,517	111	1	2.65	.908	—	—	—	—	—	—	—	—
1998–99	TPS	SM-l	39	26	6	6	—	2,259	70	4	1.86	.936	10	9	1	580	15	3	1.55	—
1999–00	Kentucky Thoroughblades	AHL	47	23	19	4	—	2,759	144	3	2.48	.924	5	1	3	239	13	0	3.27	.904
2000–01	Kentucky Thoroughblades	AHL	36	19	9	6	—	2,038	76	2	2.24	.926	—	—	—	—	—	—	—	—
2000–01	San Jose Sharks	NHL	5	2	1	0	—	154	5	0	1.95	.902	3	1	1	149	5	0	2.01	.937
2001–02	Cleveland Barons	AHL	4	4	0	0	—	242	7	0	1.73	.949	—	—	—	—	—	—	—	—
2001–02	San Jose Sharks	NHL	20	7	6	3	—	1041	43	2	2.49	.915	1	0	0	7	0	0	0.00	1.000
2002–03	San Jose Sharks	NHL	22	5	14	0	—	1,199	65	1	3.25	.879	—	—	—	—	—	—	—	—
2003–04	Calgary Flames	NHL	38	24	10	4	—	2,300	65	4	1.69	.933	26	15	11	1,655	51	5	1.85	.928
2004–05	Timrå IK	SEL	46	—	—	—	—	2,719	97	5	2.14	.918	6	—	—	356	13	0	2.19	.890
2005–06	Calgary Flames	NHL	74	42	20	—	11	4,379	151	10	2.07	.923	7	3	4	428	16	0	2.24	.921
2006–07	Calgary Flames	NHL	74	40	24	—	9	4,419	181	7	2.46	.917	6	2	4	383	18	0	2.81	.929
2007–08	Calgary Flames	NHL	76	39	26	—	10	4,398	197	2	2.69	.906	7	2	4	336	18	1	3.21	.908
2008–09	Calgary Flames	NHL	76	45	24	—	5	4,418	209	4	2.84	.903	6	2	4	324	19	0	3.52	.884
2009–10	Calgary Flames	NHL	73	35	28	—	10	4,235	163	4	2.31	.920	—	—	—	—	—	—	—	—
2010–11	Calgary Flames	NHL	71	37	24	—	6	4,156	182	6	2.63	.906	—	—	—	—	—	—	—	—
2011–12	Calgary Flames	NHL	70	35	22	—	11	4,128	162	4	2.35	.921	—	—	—	—	—	—	—	—
2012–13	Calgary Flames	NHL	24	8	14	—	2	1,344	77	0	3.44	.882	—	—	—	—	—	—	—	—
SM-l totals			55	34	10	7	—	3,049	120	4	2.36	—	15	11	2	814	26	3	1.91	—
NHL totals			623	319	213	7	64	36,169	1,500	44	2.49	.912	56	25	28	3,284	127	6	2.32	.921

=== International ===
Year	Team	Event	GP	W	L	T	MIN	GA	SO	GAA	SV%
1994	Finland	EJC	3	—	—	—	179	13	0	4.36	.888
1995	Finland	WJC	2	—	—	—	116	5	0	2.58	.889
1996	Finland	WJC	3	1	2	0	159	9	0	3.39	.905
1999	Finland	WC	3	—	—	—	156	3	0	1.16	.954
2001	Finland	WC	3	2	1	0	140	5	1	2.14	.889
2004	Finland	WCH	6	4	1	1	363	9	2	1.48	.940
2010	Finland	OLY	5	3	2	—	250	11	1	2.64	.894
Senior totals			17	—	—	—	909	28	4	1.85	.922

=== All-Star Games ===
Year	Decision	MIN	SA	GA	GAA	Sv%
2007	—	20	11	3	9.00	.727
All-Star totals	0–0–0	20	11	3	9.00	.727

== Awards and honours ==
Award	Year
SM-liiga
Kanada-malja champion	1995, 1999
Urpo Ylönen trophy	1999
Jari Kurri trophy	1999
SM-liiga All-Star team	1999
NHL
William M. Jennings Trophy	2006
Vezina Trophy	2006
NHL first team All-Star	2006
Calgary Flames
Molson Cup	2006, 2007, 2009
No. 34 retired	2024

== See also ==
- List of Olympic medalist families

Awards and achievements
Preceded by Tim Thomas	Winner of the Urpo Ylönen trophy 1998–99	Succeeded by Pasi Nurminen
Preceded by Olli Jokinen	Winner of the Jari Kurri trophy 1998–99	Succeeded by Tomi Kallio
Preceded by Martin Brodeur	Winner of the William M. Jennings Trophy; 2006	Succeeded by Niklas Bäckström and Manny Fernandez
Preceded by Martin Brodeur	Winner of the Vezina Trophy; 2006	Succeeded by Martin Brodeur
