= Tuomas Tarkki =

Finnish ice hockey goaltender and coach

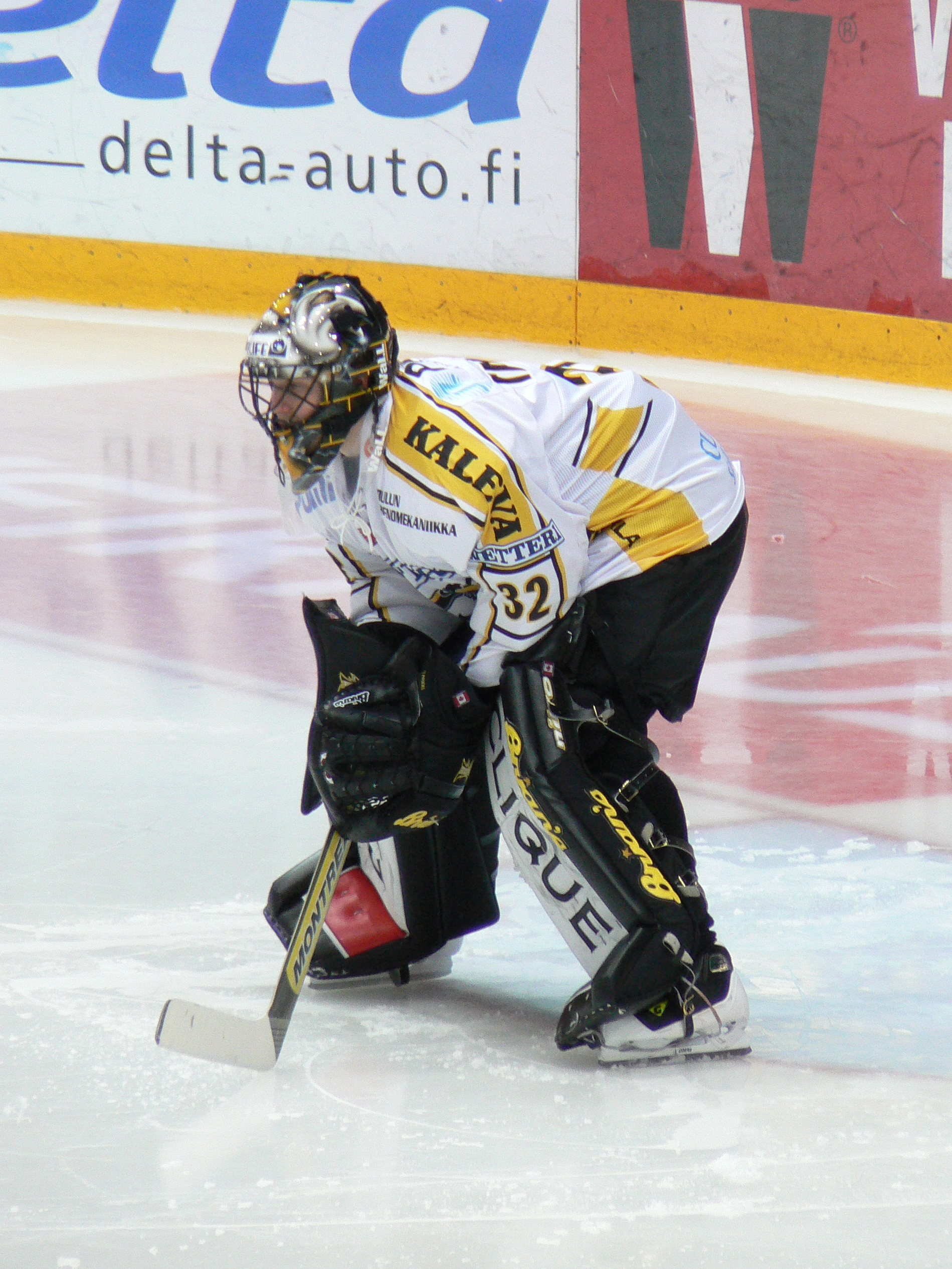
- Tarkki with Oulun Kärpät in 2007
- Born: 28 February 1980 (age 46) Rauma, Finland
- Height: 6 ft 4 in (193 cm)
- Weight: 192 lb (87 kg; 13 st 10 lb)
- Position: Goaltender
- Caught: Left
- Played for: Rauman Lukko; Chicago Wolves; Oulun Kärpät; Modo Hockey; HC Neftekhimik; JYP Jyväskylä; BK Mladá Boleslav; Nordsjælland Cobras
- Current coach: Finland
- Coached for: Oulun Kärpät Naiset; Vaasan Sport U18; Finland U18
- National team: Finland
- NHL draft: Undrafted
- Playing career: 1996–2017
- Coaching career: 2017–present

Tuomas Sakari Tarkki (born 28 February 1980) is a Finnish former professional ice hockey goaltender and the goaltending coach of the Finnish women's national team. He played college ice hockey in the NCAA and professionally in the Finnish Liiga, the American Hockey League (AHL), the Swedish Elitserien, the Kontinental Hockey League (KHL), the Czech Extraliga, and the Danish Metal Ligaen.

== Playing career ==
After playing his junior ice hockey career with Lukko, including three SM-liiga games as a backup, Tarkki studied at the Northern Michigan University and played four years of college hockey with the Northern Michigan Wildcats men's ice hockey program. In the 2004–05 season, he was an AHCA All-America selection and was named both the CCHA Player of the Year and CCHA Goaltender of the Year in 2005.

After college, he spent a year in the North American minor leagues before returning to Finland to replace the injured Andy Chiodo as the Kärpät starting goaltender.

On 9 December 2006, Tarkki made SM-liiga history by facing his younger brother, Iiro Tarkki, who was in goal for SaiPa. This was the first time in the league that two brothers had played against each other in goal. Tuomas made 31 saves and registered a shutout while Iiro, five years his junior, allowed four goals on 20 shots.

== International play ==
Tarkki made his debut with the Finnish national team on 15 December 2007, in the Channel One Cup on the Euro Hockey Tour, playing one game against the Czech Republic. Tarkki had a dismal game, allowing five goals on 23 shots.

== Personal life ==
Tarkki is married to former Finnish women's national team defenseman Saija Tarkki (née Sirviö).

== Career statistics ==
=== Regular season ===
Season	Team	League	GP	W	L	T	MIN	GA	SO	GAA	Sv%
1996–97	Lukko	SM-l	3	0	0	0	0	0	0	--	--
2001–02	Northern Michigan University	NCAA	4	2	1	0	145	6	0	2.48	91.4%
2002–03	Northern Michigan University	NCAA	6	2	1	0	244	11	0	2.70	88.7%
2003–04	Northern Michigan University	NCAA	0	0	0	0	0	0	0	--	--
2004–05	Northern Michigan University	NCAA	34	20	8	5	1974	68	3	2.07	93.0%
2005–06	Gwinnett Gladiators	ECHL	7	4	2	1	425	20	1	2.83	91.0%
2005–06	Chicago Wolves	AHL	31	13	10	4	1685	91	1	3.24	88.8%
2006–07	Kärpät	SM-l	26	17	5	3	1530.52	49	4	1.92	93.68%

=== International ===
Season	Tournament	GP	W	L	T	MIN	GA	SO	GAA	Sv%
2007	EHT	1	0	0	1	65	5	0	4.62	78.26%

== Awards and achievements ==
Award	Year
College
All-CCHA First Team	2004-05
AHCA West Second-Team All-American	2004–05

Awards and achievements
Preceded by Dominic Vicari	CCHA Best Goaltender; 2004-05	Succeeded by Charlie Effinger
Preceded by Derek Edwardson	CCHA Player of the Year; 2004-05	Succeeded by Scott Parse
Preceded by Juuso Riksman	Winner of the Urpo Ylönen trophy 2006–07, 2007-08	Succeeded by Juuso Riksman
