= 1999 Karjala Tournament =

1999 Karjala Tournament II
Tournament details
- Host country: Finland
- Cities: Helsinki; Espoo
- Venues: 2 (in 2 host cities)
- Dates: 11-14 November 1999
- Teams: 4

Final positions
- Champions: Finland (3rd title)
- Runners-up: Russia
- Third place: Czech Republic
- Fourth place: Sweden

Tournament statistics
- Games played: 6
- Goals scored: 29 (4.83 per game)
- Attendance: 16,000 (2,667 per game)
- Scoring leader: (Russia) Alexander Kharitonov (4 points)

The 1999 Karjala Tournament was played between 11 and 14 November 1999. The Czech Republic, Finland, Sweden and Russia played a round-robin for a total of three games per team and six games in total. Four game was played in LänsiAuto Areena, Espoo, Finland and two games was played in Hartwall Areena, Helsinki. Finland won the tournament. The tournament was part of the 1999–2000 Euro Hockey Tour.

== Standings ==
Pos	Team	Pld	W	D	L	GF	GA	GD	Pts
1	Finland	3	3	0	0	8	5	+3	6
2	Russia	3	2	0	1	8	7	+1	4
3	Czech Republic	3	1	0	2	7	7	0	2
4	Sweden	3	0	0	3	6	11	−5	0

Source: hokej

== Games ==
All times are local. Helsinki – (Eastern European Time – UTC+2) Espoo – (Eastern European Time – UTC+2)

11 November 1999; 17:00	Russia	4-3 (1-1, 3-2, 0-0)	Sweden	LänsiAuto Areena, Espoo

Game reference

Yegor Podomatsky
Goalies
Magnus Eriksson

	0-1	04:00 – Wernblom (Johansson, Franzén)
Kharitonov (Prokopyev, Kuvaldin) – 18:00	1-1
Filimonov (Sushinsky, Datsyuk) – 26:00	2-1
Kharitonov (Markov) – 29:00	3-1
Kuvaldin (Kharitonov) – 32:00	4-1
	4-2	34:00 – Mattsson (Påhlsson)
	4-3	38:00 – Wernblom (Jönsson)

8 min
Penalties
6 min

11 November 1999; 18:30	Czech Republic	2-3 (0-1, 1-2, 1-0)	Finland	LänsiAuto Areena, Espoo

Game reference

Dušan Salfický
Goalies
Ari Sulander

	0-1	20:00 – Lenterä (Virta, Sihvonen)
	0-2	26:00 – Tarvainen (Karalahti)
	0-3	29:00 – Kakko (Virta, Nummelin)
Čajánek (Hamrlík) – 40:00	1-3
Dopita (Výborný, Špaňhel) – 58:00	2-3

13 November 1999; 15:00	Finland	2-1 (0-0, 1-0, 1-1)	Russia	LänsiAuto Areena, Espoo

Game reference

Vesa Toskala
Goalies
Yegor Podomatsky

Sihvonen (Karalahti) – 36:00	1-0
Riihijärvi – 51:00	2-0
	2-1	60:00 – Bets

14 min
Penalties
14 min

13 November 1999; 18:30	Czech Republic	4-1 (0-1, 1-0, 3-0)	Sweden	LänsiAuto Areena, Espoo; Attendance: 2,500

Game reference
Zdeněk Orct	Goalies	Magnus Eriksson	Referee: (Finland) Jukka Pakaslahti; Linesmen: (Finland) Tarko (Finland) Peltonen
Martínek (Čaloun) – 37:00 / Dopita (Reichel, Kučera) – 46:00 / Špaňhel (Kučera, Zdeněk Orct) – 52:00 / Reichel – 60:00 / Goals / 60:000 – Huselius			Referee: (Finland) Jukka Pakaslahti; Linesmen: (Finland) Tarko (Finland) Peltonen
8 min	Penalties	14 min	Referee: (Finland) Jukka Pakaslahti; Linesmen: (Finland) Tarko (Finland) Peltonen

14 November 1999; 15:00	Czech Republic	1-3 (1-0, 0-2, 0-1)	Russia	Hartwall Areena, Helsinki

Game reference

Zdeněk Orct
Goalies
Yegor Podomatsky

Cajánek (Tenkrát, Hanzlík) – 13:00	1-0
	1-1	26:00 – Gusmanov (Krasotkin, Bets)
	1-2	40:00 – Sushinsky (Datsyuk)
	1-3	60:00 – Kharitonov (Khavanov)

16 min
Penalties
10 min

14 November 1999; 18:30	Finland	3-2 (2-1, 1-0, 0-1)	Sweden	Hartwall Areena, Helsinki; Attendance: 13,500

Game reference
Ari Sulander	Goalies	Johan Holmqvist Magnus Eriksson	Referee: (Czech Republic) Vladimír Šindler; Linesmen: (Finland) Hirvi (Finland) Aberg
Saarela (Sihvonen) – 03:00 / Pärssinen (Kapanen, Hentunen) – 15:00 / Kakko (Riihijärvi) – 40:00 / Goals / 14:00 – Wernblom (Johnsson, Wallin) / 46:00 – Ekelund (Nordström, Påhlsson)			Referee: (Czech Republic) Vladimír Šindler; Linesmen: (Finland) Hirvi (Finland) Aberg
6 min	Penalties	10 min	Referee: (Czech Republic) Vladimír Šindler; Linesmen: (Finland) Hirvi (Finland) Aberg

== Scoring leaders ==
Pos	Player	Country	GP	G	A	Pts	+/−	PIM	POS
1	Alexander Kharitonov	Russia	3	3	1	4	0	0	F
2	Toni Sihvonen	Finland	3	1	3	4	+3	0	F
3	Magnus Wernblom	Sweden	3	3	0	3	-3	6	F
4	Petr Čajánek	Czech Republic	3	2	0	2	0	0	F
5	Jiří Dopita	Czech Republic	3	2	0	2	+1	2	F

GP = Games played; G = Goals; A = Assists; Pts = Points; +/− = Plus/minus; PIM = Penalties in minutes; POS = Position
Source: quanthockey

== Goaltending leaders ==
Pos	Player	Country	TOI	GA	GAA	Sv%	SO
1	Vesa Toskala	Finland	00:00	0	0.00	96.30	0
2	Zdeněk Orct	Czech Republic	00:00	0	0.00	95.24	0
3	Ari Sulander	Finland	00:00	0	0.00	92.98	0
3	Dušan Salfický	Czech Republic	00:00	0	0.00	92.86	0

TOI = Time on ice (minutes:seconds); SA = Shots against; GA = Goals against; GAA = Goals Against Average; Sv% = Save percentage; SO = Shutouts
Source: swehockey

== Tournament awards ==
The tournament directorate named the following players in the tournament 1999:

Media All-Star Team A:

- Goaltender: (Finland) Vesa Toskala
- Defence: (Finland) Jere Karalahti, (Czech Republic) Jiří Kučera
- Forwards: (Sweden) Magnus Wernblom , (Czech Republic) Jiří Dopita, (Russia) Alexander Kharitonov

Media All-Star Team B:

- Goaltender: (Finland) Ari Sulander
- Defence: (Czech Republic) Petr Sýkora, (Finland) Erik Kakko
- Forwards: (Finland) Tony Virta, (Finland) Kari Sihvonen, (Finland) Juha Riihijärvi
