= Sihvonen =

Sihvonen is a Finnish surname. Notable people with the surname include:

- Iris Sihvonen (1940–2010), Finnish speedskater
- Kari Sihvonen (born 1983), Finnish ice hockey player
- Olavi Sihvonen (1918–1984), Finnish skier
