= Antti Tyrväinen =

Antti Tyrväinen may refer to:

- Antti Tyrväinen (biathlete)
- Antti Tyrväinen (ice hockey)
