= Toni Dahlman =

Finnish ice hockey player

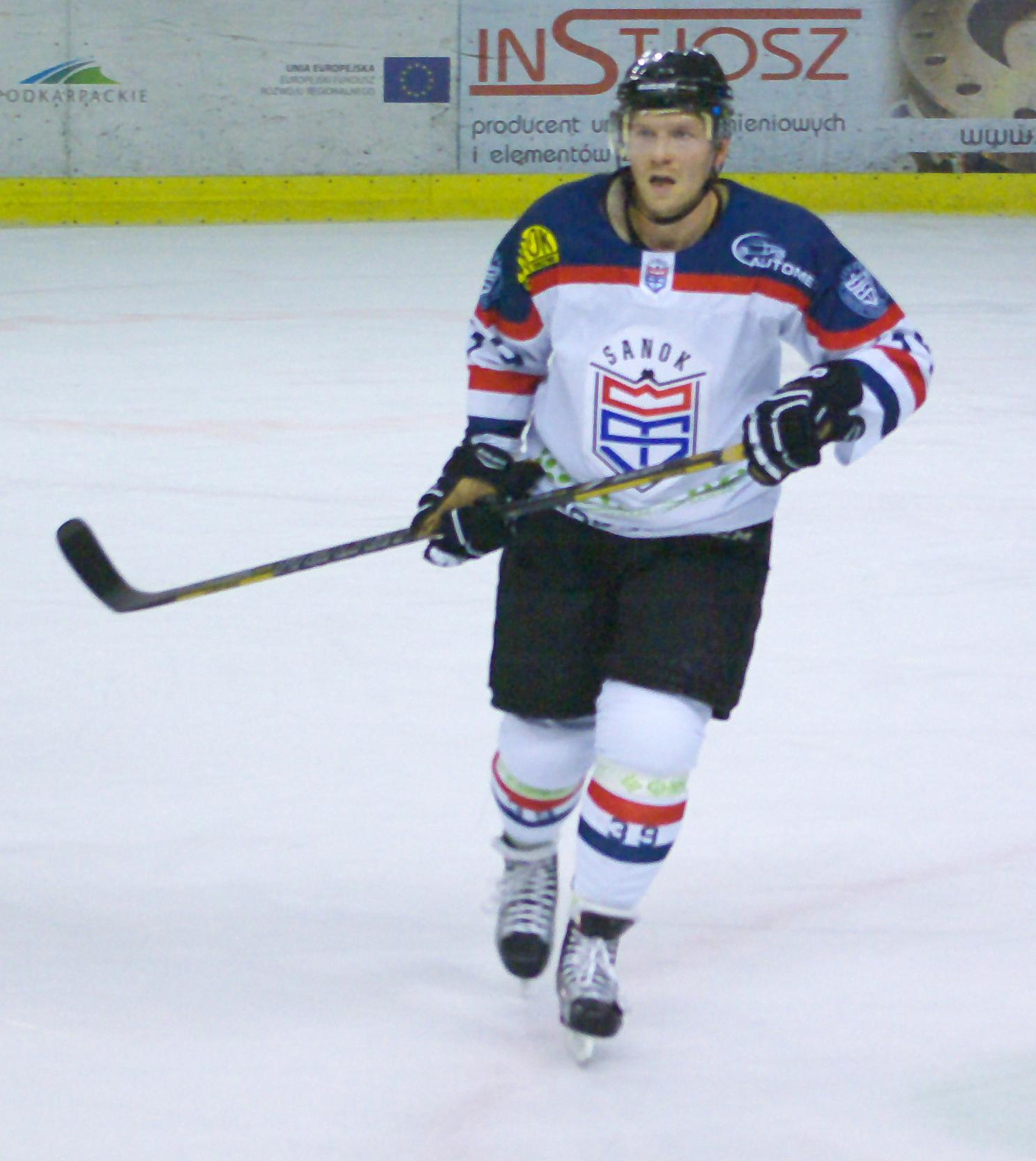
- Toni Dahlman playing for KH Sanok (2015)
- Born: 3 September 1979 (age 46) Helsinki, Finland
- Height: 5 ft 11 in (180 cm)
- Weight: 194 lb (88 kg; 13 st 12 lb)
- Position: Right wing
- Shot: Right
- Played for: Jokerit; Ilves; Ottawa Senators; Lukko Rauma; Mora IK; Kärpät; HIFK; KalPa; HK Jesenice; Grizzly Adams Wolfsburg; Graz 99ers Arystan Temirtau; Sputnik Nizhny Tagil; KH Sanok; Braehead Clan
- NHL draft: 286th overall, 2001; Ottawa Senators
- Playing career: 1998–2016

Toni Dahlman (born 3 September 1979) is a Finnish former professional ice hockey player. He played 22 games in the National Hockey League with the Ottawa Senators.

== Playing career ==
Dahlman began playing hockey in the first division Kiekko-Kissat in the 1996–97 season and moved on to the Jokerit junior team, and eventually to Jokerit for the 1998–99 season. In 2000 Dahlman transferred to Ilves and went on to win the bronze medal and the 2001 Jarmo Wasama memorial trophy as best rookie.

He was drafted by the Ottawa Senators of the National Hockey League (NHL) as their 9th round pick in the 2001 NHL entry draft, 286th overall.

Dahlman played two seasons in North America firstly in 2001–02 with the Grand Rapids Griffins of the American Hockey League and ten games with the Ottawa Senators. In the 2002–03 season, Dahlman played briefly for Ottawa before returning to the AHL with affiliate, the Binghamton Senators. Over his 22 NHL games, Dahlman only scored one goal and one assist.

Dahlman returned to Finland for the 2003–04 season and represented Ilves in a total of 41 games, scoring 9 goals and 18 assists. He returned to Jokerit for the 2004–05 season, where he scored 16 goals and 7 assists, sharing the top goal scorer spot on his team with Glen Metropolit and Marko Jantunen. Jokerit won the silver medal that season.

On 20 April 2011, Dahlman left the Grizzly Adams after a finals appearance in the Deutsche Eishockey Liga, and returned to Austria on a one-year contract to play with Graz.

After a two-year stint in Kazakhstan with Arystan Temirtau and a one-year stint with the VHL's Sputnik Nizhny Tagil, he signed with Ciarko PBS Bank STS Sanok in Poland for the 2015–16 season.

== International play ==
Medal record

Representing Finland

Ice hockey

World Junior Championships
Gold medal – first place	1998 Helsinki	

Dahlman represented Finland in the IIHF 1998 under-20's world championships where they won the gold medal. He played in six games and scored two goals.

== Career statistics ==
=== Regular season and playoffs ===
			Regular season					Playoffs
Season	Team	League	GP	G	A	Pts	PIM	GP	G	A	Pts	PIM
1994–95	Grankulla IFK	FIN U16	10	3	2	5	6	—	—	—	—	—
1996–97	Karhu–Kissat	FIN U18	10	4	5	9	4	—	—	—	—	—
1996–97	Karhu–Kissat	FIN-2 U20	22	11	18	29	6	—	—	—	—	—
1996–97	Karhu–Kissat	FIN-3	1	1	0	1	0	—	—	—	—	—
1997–98	Jokerit	FIN U20	21	13	11	24	14	7	2	2	4	0
1998–99	Jokerit	FIN U20	33	10	22	32	6	9	4	3	7	2
1998–99	Jokerit	SM-l	5	0	0	0	0	3	0	1	1	0
1999–2000	Jokerit	FIN U20	12	6	8	14	4	12	7	7	14	4
1999–2000	Jokerit	SM-l	1	0	0	0	0	—	—	—	—	—
1999–2000	Hermes	FIN-2	23	6	3	9	4	—	—	—	—	—
2000–01	Ilves	SM-l	56	10	18	28	16	9	3	2	5	2
2001–02	Grand Rapids Griffins	AHL	50	6	8	14	25	4	0	0	0	0
2001–02	Ottawa Senators	NHL	10	0	1	1	0	—	—	—	—	—
2002–03	Binghamton Senators	AHL	59	6	18	24	14	5	0	0	0	14
2002–03	Ottawa Senators	NHL	12	1	0	1	0	—	—	—	—	—
2003–04	Ilves	SM-l	41	9	18	27	43	7	0	3	3	2
2004–05	Jokerit	SM-l	56	16	7	23	43	12	3	2	5	4
2005–06	Jokerit	SM-l	54	10	11	21	37	—	—	—	—	—
2006–07	Lukko	SM-l	53	15	25	40	26	3	0	0	0	0
2007–08	Mora IK	SEL	50	8	16	24	14	—	—	—	—	—
2008–09	Mora IK	Allsv	6	1	2	3	4	—	—	—	—	—
2008–09	Kärpät	SM-l	26	2	11	13	8	8	0	0	0	0
2009–10	HIFK	SM-l	7	1	2	3	2	—	—	—	—	—
2009–10	KalPa	SM-l	20	3	4	7	4	13	1	1	2	6
2010–11	HK Acroni Jesenice	AUT	20	9	12	21	20	—	—	—	—	—
2010–11	Grizzly Adams Wolfsburg	DEL	12	0	5	5	0	7	0	2	2	0
2011–12	Graz 99ers	AUT	46	8	20	28	16	—	—	—	—	—
2012–13	Arystan Temirtau	KAZ	30	7	17	24	12	13	0	3	3	6
2013–14	Arystan Temirtau	KAZ	45	16	29	45	70	15	5	6	11	16
2014–15	Sputnik Nizhny Tagil	VHL	44	5	9	14	45	7	1	3	4	4
2015–16	STS Sanok	POL	22	4	13	17	12	—	—	—	—	—
2015–16	Braehead Clan	EIHL	13	1	8	9	0	—	—	—	—	—
SM-l totals			319	66	96	162	179	55	7	9	16	14
NHL totals			22	1	1	2	0	—	—	—	—	—

=== International ===
Year	Team	Event	GP	G	A	Pts	PIM
1998	Finland	WJC	6	2	0	2	0
Junior totals			6	2	0	2	0

== Awards ==
- 2001 -Awarded the Jarmo Wasama memorial trophy as the best rookie in the SM-liiga.

Preceded by Antero Niittymäki	Winner of the Jarmo Wasama memorial trophy 2000–01	Succeeded by Joonas Vihko
