= Marko Jantunen =

Finnish ice hockey player (born 1971)

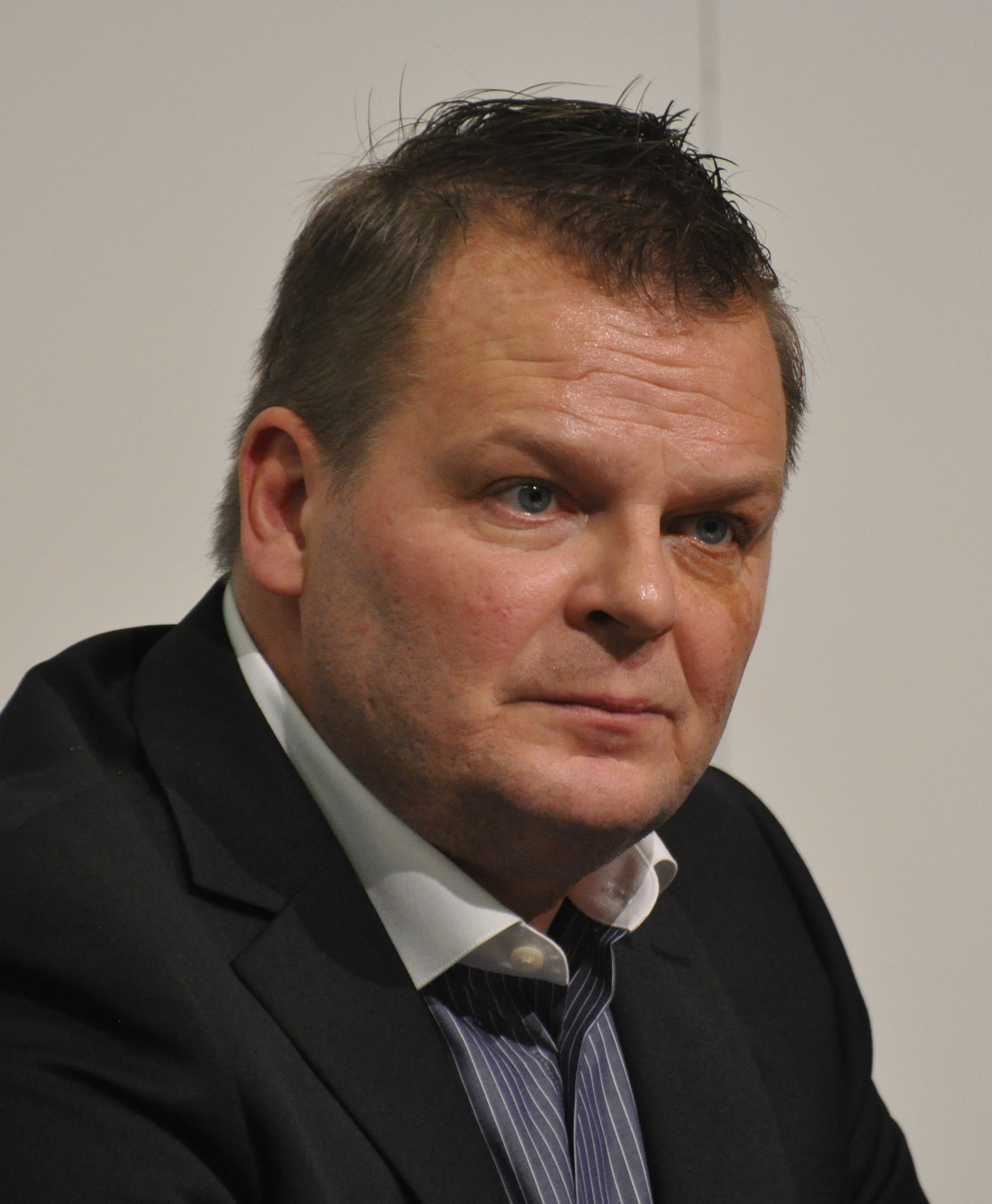
- Born: February 14, 1971 (age 55) Lahti, Finland
- Height: 5 ft 11 in (180 cm)
- Weight: 187 lb (85 kg; 13 st 5 lb)
- Position: Right wing
- Shot: Left
- Played for: Hockey-Reipas; KalPa; TPS; Västra Frölunda HC; Calgary Flames; Färjestad BK; Jokerit; Timra IK; Lahti Pelicans
- NHL draft: 239th overall, 1991; Calgary Flames
- Playing career: 1990–2010

Marko Jantunen (born February 14, 1971) is a Finnish former professional ice hockey player. He was drafted by the Calgary Flames in the 11th round, 239th overall, of the 1991 NHL entry draft.

== Playing career ==
Jantunen began his career in Kiekko-Reipas (later Hockey-Reipas) in 1988, and played there for four seasons. For the 1992–93 season he transferred to KalPa, and in 1993–94 he played for TPS, where he won his first SM-liiga medal, a silver one. He won the Aarne Honkavaara trophy for most regular season goals in the league that season; Jantunen played on TPS's first line with future NHL trophy winners Jere Lehtinen and Saku Koivu.

His career in the Swedish Elitserien started in 1994 when he began his first season with Frölunda HC. Jantunen stayed with Frölunda for five seasons, broken by a short visit to the NHL (see below). In 1999 he transferred to Färjestad BK, where he played for four seasons, until 2003.

He won a silver medal in 1995–96 with Frölunda, and two silver medals and the Elitserien championship in 2001–2002 with Färjestad. During his 374-game tenure in Sweden Jantunen recorded a total of 123 goals and 137 assists.

In April 2003 Jantunen signed a three-year contract with Jokerit, where he was named assistant captain and led the club in scoring with 19 goals during the regular season. He was a team second in overall points, after Glen Metropolit, with 40 points. This total ranked him sixteenth in overall scoring in the league.

In the 2004–05 season, Jantunen won the silver medal with Jokerit. He scored 16 goals during the regular season, sharing the Jokerit top goal scorer title with Glen Metropolit and Toni Dahlman. He was second in overall points in the team with 24 assists, again after Glen Metropolit. He scored two short-handed goals in the playoffs.

A foot injury in August 2005 sidelined Jantunen until November. When he returned to action he was named the captain. The spell was however short, as in December he was stripped of his captaincy, and finally in January 2006 Jantunen was released from his contract for disciplinary reasons. He subsequently signed with Timrå IK in the Swedish Elitserien for the remainder of the season.

After the spell with Timrå, Jantunen finally made the long-awaited return home by signing a two-year contract with Lahti Pelicans in April 2006. During the regular season 2006–07, he recorded 41 points in 56 games, which made him the leading scorer of the Pelicans (tied with Matias Loppi).

=== NHL career ===
Jantunen played three games for the Calgary Flames in 1996–97, scoring no points. He also played 23 games for the Saint John Flames in the AHL, scoring 8 goals and 16 assists.

== International play ==
Jantunen has represented Finland at the under-20's World Championships in 1991, as well as in the 1997 IIHF world championships. During his time in TPS, he played in the European Championships and won the gold medal in 1994; he also won a bronze medal in the EHL for Frölunda in 1997.

== Awards ==
- Aarne Honkavaara trophy for most goals scored during regular season play – 1993–94

== Career statistics ==
=== Regular season and playoffs ===
			Regular season					Playoffs
Season	Team	League	GP	G	A	Pts	PIM	GP	G	A	Pts	PIM
1987–88	Kiekkoreipas	FIN II Jr	21	11	16	27	34	—	—	—	—	—
1988–89	Kiekkoreipas	FIN II Jr	15	4	10	14	30	—	—	—	—	—
1988–89	Kiekkoreipas	FIN II	35	2	17	19	24	—	—	—	—	—
1989–90	PvUK	FIN Jr	8	4	9	13	6	—	—	—	—	—
1989–90	Kiekkoreipas	FIN Jr	10	6	7	13	44	—	—	—	—	—
1989–90	Hockey Reipas	FIN II	31	11	19	30	20	4	1	2	3	6
1990–91	Hockey Reipas	FIN Jr	1	0	4	4	0	—	—	—	—	—
1990–91	Hockey Reipas	SM-l	39	9	20	29	20	—	—	—	—	—
1991–92	Hockey Reipas	SM-l	42	10	14	24	46	—	—	—	—	—
1992–93	KalPa	SM-l	48	21	27	48	63	—	—	—	—	—
1993–94	TPS	SM-l	48	29	29	58	22	11	2	6	8	12
1994–95	Västra Frölunda HC	SEL	22	15	8	23	22	—	—	—	—	—
1995–96	Västra Frölunda HC	SEL	40	17	14	31	64	13	8	8	16	10
1996–97	Calgary Flames	NHL	3	0	0	0	0	—	—	—	—	—
1996–97	Saint John Flames	AHL	23	8	16	24	18	—	—	—	—	—
1996–97	Västra Frölunda HC	SEL	13	4	7	11	16	3	2	0	2	16
1997–98	Västra Frölunda HC	SEL	43	14	20	34	61	7	1	2	3	2
1998–99	Västra Frölunda HC	SEL	47	12	21	33	57	4	4	0	4	4
1999–2000	Färjestad BK	SEL	50	18	18	36	36	7	0	2	2	8
2000–01	Färjestad BK	SEL	48	20	16	36	60	14	4	5	9	40
2001–02	Färjestad BK	SEL	50	12	5	17	32	10	3	6	9	2
2002–03	Färjestad BK	SEL	50	10	24	34	42	14	3	1	4	6
2003–04	Jokerit	SM-l	51	19	21	40	18	5	0	0	0	2
2004–05	Jokerit	SM-l	56	16	24	40	20	12	6	7	13	2
2005–06	Jokerit	SM-l	16	3	5	8	14	—	—	—	—	—
2005–06	Timrå IK	SEL	11	2	4	6	4	—	—	—	—	—
2006–07	Pelicans	SM-l	56	12	29	41	30	6	1	2	3	2
2007–08	Pelicans	SM-l	56	18	24	42	30	6	6	3	9	0
2008–09	Pelicans	SM-l	56	16	29	45	40	10	2	2	4	2
2009–10	Pelicans	SM-l	54	15	22	37	40	—	—	—	—	—
2015–16	HC Giants	FIN IV	5	1	1	2	2	—	—	—	—	—
SM-l totals			519	168	244	412	343	50	17	20	37	20
SEL totals			374	124	137	261	394	72	25	24	49	88

=== International ===
Year	Team	Event	GP	G	A	Pts	PIM
1989	Finland	EJC	6	3	4	7	6
1991	Finland	WJC	7	3	10	13	12
1997	Finland	WC	8	1	0	1	6
Junior totals			13	6	14	20	18
Senior totals			8	1	0	1	6

Preceded by Tomáš Kapusta	Winner of the Aarne Honkavaara trophy 1993–94	Succeeded by Kai Nurminen
Preceded by Petri Varis	Jokerit captain November 2005–December 2005	Succeeded by Petri Varis
