= Tyrväinen =

Surname list

Tyrväinen is the surname of the following people:

- Antti Tyrväinen (biathlete) (1933–2013), Finnish biathlete
- Antti Tyrväinen (born 1989), Finnish ice hockey player
- Juhani Tyrväinen (born 1990), Finnish ice hockey player
