= Glen Metropolit =

Canadian ice hockey player (born 1974)

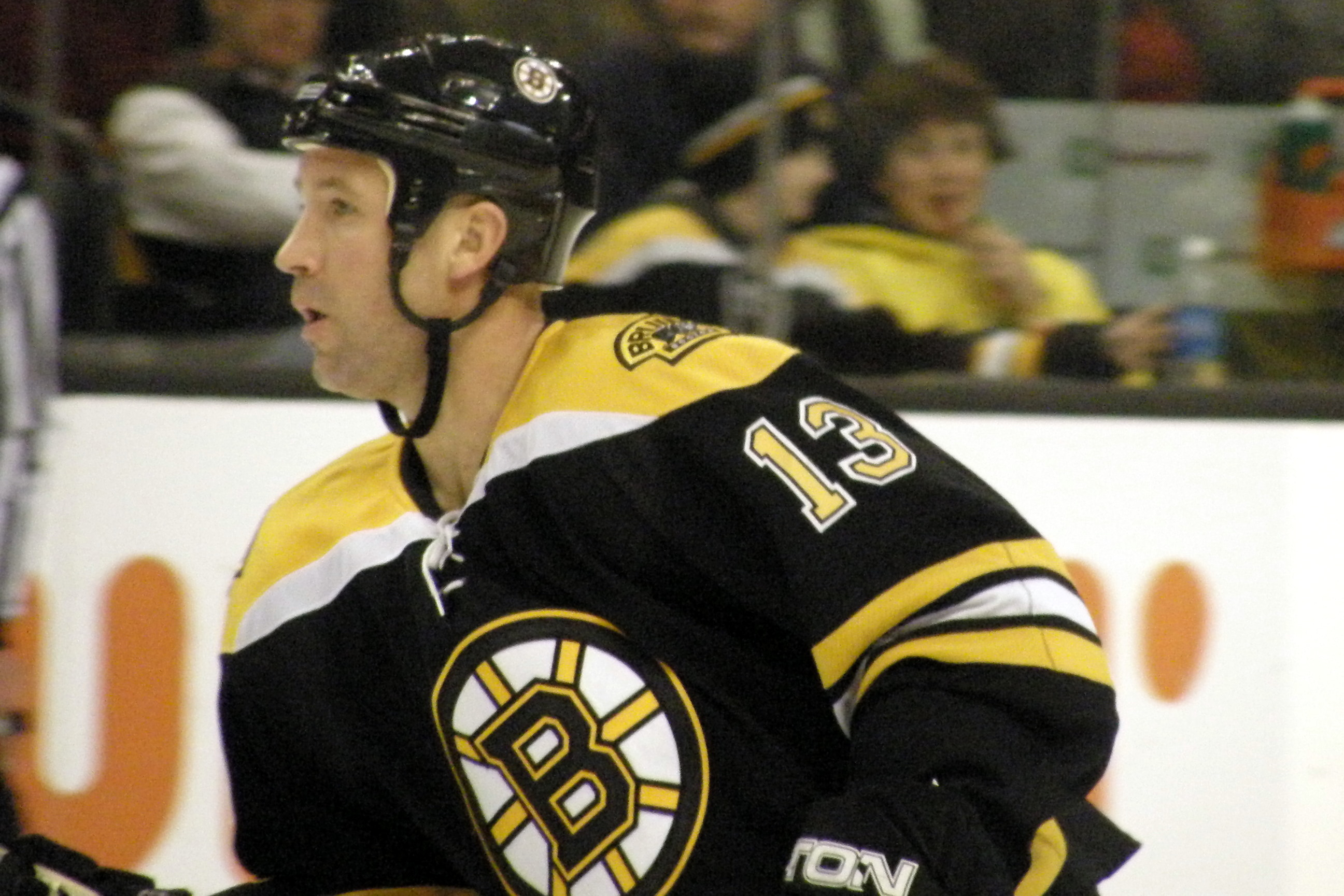
- Metropolit with the Boston Bruins in 2008
- Born: June 25, 1974 (age 52) Toronto, Ontario, Canada
- Height: 5 ft 10 in (178 cm)
- Weight: 193 lb (88 kg; 13 st 11 lb)
- Position: Centre
- Shot: Right
- Played for: Washington Capitals; Tampa Bay Lightning; Jokerit; HC Lugano; Atlanta Thrashers; St. Louis Blues; Boston Bruins; Philadelphia Flyers; Montreal Canadiens; EV Zug; SC Bern; Adler Mannheim; HC Bolzano
- National team: Canada
- NHL draft: Undrafted
- Playing career: 1995–2017

Glen David Metropolit (born June 25, 1974) is a Canadian former professional ice hockey centre who most notably played over 400 games in the National Hockey League (NHL)

== Playing career ==
=== Early years ===
A native of Toronto, Ontario, Metropolit was never drafted by an OHL or NHL team, yet managed a 10-year NHL career and 407 games played. After a GTHL career mostly in AA hockey, Metropolit played two seasons for the Richmond Hill Riots Jr.B. hockey club (OHA) before heading west to play for the Vernon Lakers of the BCHL.

After graduating Tier II Jr. A hockey, Metropolit started out playing for the Nashville Knights in the ECHL in the 1995–96 season. He also played for the Pensacola Ice Pilots and Grand Rapids Griffins before making his NHL debut in 1999–2000 for the Washington Capitals. For the next three seasons, he alternated between the Capitals and the AHL's Portland Pirates, and also played two games for Tampa Bay in 2001–02.

=== Overseas ===
In 2003 Metropolit crossed the Atlantic to play in Helsinki with Jokerit for the 2003–04 season. In a brilliant first season, he scored the most points on the team, 50, with 15 goals and 35 assists, the fifth-highest total during the regular season. He scored six goals during seven playoff games that year, but Jokerit were eliminated in the quarterfinals.

In the 2004–05 season Metropolit and Marko Jantunen were the team's best goal scorers during the regular season, both scoring 16 goals, and Metropolit scored the most points on the team with 31 assists, totalling 47 points; the eighth-highest total in the league. In the playoffs, he scored five goals and six assists, including a 3-on-5 shorthanded goal against Ilves's Vesa Toskala in the quarterfinals. The team went on to win the silver medal.

Metropolit in 2008

Metropolit became a popular player with the Jokerit fans, who had a number of chants dedicated to him. He is remembered as a playmaker, with one of his favorite spots, on the outside of the left faceoff circle in the offensive zone, being called "Metro's office" by TV commentators and fans, in honour of Wayne Gretzky's "office" behind the goal. He and Marko Jantunen made a compatible pair on the penalty kill, scoring a lot of goals with only four players. He wore the number 50 on his Jokerit jersey.

After two years with Jokerit, Metropolit moved to Switzerland where he won the Nationalliga A championship with HC Lugano. He also led the league in scoring during the regular season, which is where his infamous nickname "The Underlying Theme" was born by announcer Darren Bavister.

=== Atlanta/St. Louis/Boston ===
In 2006, Metropolit returned to North America when he was signed by the Atlanta Thrashers. After limited playing time with Atlanta, Metropolit was dealt near the trade deadline to the St. Louis Blues, along with a package of draft picks, in exchange for Blues centre/wing Keith Tkachuk.

Metropolit became a free agent at the end of the season before being invited by the Boston Bruins to the team training camp. Just prior to the 2007–08 season on October 3, 2007, he signed a one-year contract with the Bruins. Having established a role within the checking lines and on the power play, he excelled with the Bruins, posting a career high 33 points in 82 games.

=== Philadelphia/Montreal ===
Metropolit signed a two-year contract with the Philadelphia Flyers as a free agent on July 1, 2008. He was placed on waivers and picked up near the trading deadline on February 27, 2009, by the Montreal Canadiens in need of a veteran centreman. He trained with the Philadelphia Flyers on the morning of February 27 before being claimed in the afternoon. Later that night, he played against his former team with the Montreal Canadiens. He scored his first goal with Montreal on March 10 against Dwayne Roloson from the Edmonton Oilers.

In the 2009–10 season on March 30, 2010, it was announced that Metropolit would miss the final 6 games of the season with a torn shoulder muscle, after enjoying a career high 16 goals with Montreal. An extremely speedy recovery allowed him to be back on the ice on April 19, 2010, for the third game of the playoff series against the Washington Capitals.

=== After the NHL ===
On August 2, 2010, Metropolit left the NHL as a free agent and signed a two-year contract to return the Swiss NLA with EV Zug. Upon completion of his contract with Zug, Metropolit moved to return to sign a two-year contract with HC Lugano. In the 2013–14 season, on February 5, 2014, Metropolit was traded to SC Bern in exchange for Mikko Lehtonen. After four years in Switzerland, he moved to Germany, spending a two-year stint at Adler Mannheim, capturing the German national championship in 2015.

On October 20, 2016, he signed with Italian club HC Bolzano, a member of the Austrian top-flight EBEL. He parted ways with the club on February 6, 2017 due to family reasons.

== Career statistics ==
=== Regular season and playoffs ===
			Regular season					Playoffs
Season	Team	League	GP	G	A	Pts	PIM	GP	G	A	Pts	PIM
1994–95	Vernon Lakers	BCHL	60	43	74	117	92	—	—	—	—	—
1995–96	Nashville Knights	ECHL	58	30	31	61	62	5	3	8	11	2
1995–96	Atlanta Knights	IHL	1	0	0	0	0	—	—	—	—	—
1996–97	Pensacola Ice Pilots	ECHL	54	35	47	82	45	12	9	16	25	28
1996–97	Quebec Rafales	IHL	22	5	4	9	14	5	0	0	0	2
1997–98	Grand Rapids Griffins	IHL	79	20	35	55	90	3	1	1	2	0
1998–99	Grand Rapids Griffins	IHL	77	28	53	81	92	—	—	—	—	—
1999–00	Portland Pirates	AHL	48	18	42	60	73	1	1	0	1	0
1999–00	Washington Capitals	NHL	30	6	13	19	4	2	0	0	0	2
2000–01	Portland Pirates	AHL	51	25	42	67	73	—	—	—	—	—
2000–01	Washington Capitals	NHL	15	1	5	6	10	1	0	0	0	0
2000–01	Tampa Bay Lightning	NHL	2	0	0	0	0	—	—	—	—	—
2001–02	Portland Pirates	AHL	32	17	22	39	20	—	—	—	—	—
2001–02	Washington Capitals	NHL	33	1	16	17	6	—	—	—	—	—
2002–03	Portland Pirates	AHL	33	7	23	30	23	3	1	1	2	0
2002–03	Washington Capitals	NHL	23	2	3	5	6	—	—	—	—	—
2003–04	Jokerit	SM-l	55	15	35	50	77	7	6	1	7	33
2004–05	Jokerit	SM-l	51	16	31	47	42	12	5	6	11	20
2005–06	HC Lugano	NLA	44	23	43	66	60	17	9	17	26	8
2006–07	Atlanta Thrashers	NHL	57	12	16	28	20	—	—	—	—	—
2006–07	St. Louis Blues	NHL	20	2	3	5	14	—	—	—	—	—
2007–08	Boston Bruins	NHL	82	11	22	33	36	7	1	0	1	4
2008–09	Philadelphia Flyers	NHL	55	4	10	14	15	—	—	—	—	—
2008–09	Montreal Canadiens	NHL	21	2	1	3	13	4	0	2	2	2
2009–10	Montreal Canadiens	NHL	69	16	13	29	24	16	0	2	2	4
2010–11	EV Zug	NLA	47	15	38	53	32	10	2	10	12	8
2011–12	EV Zug	NLA	42	15	21	36	28	9	5	7	12	2
2012–13	HC Lugano	NLA	50	20	44	64	62	7	2	4	6	2
2013–14	HC Lugano	NLA	40	6	28	34	14	—	—	—	—	—
2013–14	SC Bern	NLA	3	1	0	1	0	—	—	—	—	—
2014–15	Adler Mannheim	DEL	43	6	35	41	26	12	2	4	6	16
2015–16	Adler Mannheim	DEL	49	10	17	27	64	3	0	3	3	0
2016–17	Bolzano HC	EBEL	34	4	15	19	41	—	—	—	—	—
NHL totals			407	57	102	159	148	30	1	4	5	12

=== International ===
Year	Team	Event	Result	GP	G	A	Pts	PIM
2006	Canada	WC	4th	9	0	2	2	6
Senior totals				9	0	2	2	6
