= Magnus Eriksson (ice hockey) =

Swedish ice hockey player

- Born: 12 August 1973 (age 53) Stockholm, Sweden
- Height: 5 ft 11 in (180 cm)
- Weight: 187 lb (85 kg; 13 st 5 lb)
- Position: Goaltender
- Caught: Left
- Played for: Hammarby IF; Västerås IK; Augsburger Panther; HC Milano Vipers; EC Salzburg; Odense Bulldogs; SønderjyskE; Dragons de Rouen
- National team: Sweden
- Playing career: 1995–2008

Magnus Eriksson (born 12 August 1973) is a Swedish former professional ice hockey goaltender. He has played with Milano Vipers since 2004. Before that did he represent Augsburger Panther in the Deutsche Eishockey Liga (2001–2004), Färjestads BK in the Swedish Elite League (2000–2001), VIK Västerås HK in the Swedish Elite League (1997–2000).Now he plays for the French elite hockey team Dragons de Rouen. Before signing with Västerås IK in 1997 did he play in the lower leagues in Sweden.

He won a gold medal at the 1998 IIHF World Championships.
