= Erik Kakko =

Finnish ice hockey player

- Born: May 21, 1971 (age 53); Finland
- Height: 6 ft 1 in (185 cm)
- Weight: 207 lb (94 kg; 14 st 11 lb)
- Position: Defence
- Shoots: left
- SM-liiga team: Pelicans
- Playing career: 1990–present

Erik Kakko (born May 21, 1971, Finland) is a retired professional Finnish ice hockey player.

He was playing for the Pelicans in the Finnish SM-liiga. He joined the club in Summer of 2004. Pelicans is also the club where Kakko started his career in 1990. After he left the club in 1993, has he played for the following clubs: TPS Turku (1993–1995), Kiekko-67 Turku (1993–1995, on loan from TPS), HPK (1995–1999), SCL Tigers (1999–2001), Färjestad BK (2001–2002), Frölunda Indians (2002–2004). He has won two Swedish Championships, one with Färjesatd in 2002 and one with Förlunda in 2003.
