= Lahti Pelicans =

- City: Lahti
- League: Liiga
- Founded: 1996
- Home arena: Wemasto Areena (capacity: 4,403)
- Colours: Turquoise, Navy blue, black, white, orange
- Owners: Pasi Nurminen; Sami Kallinen; Jarno Lindeman; Petri Kumpulainen; Tomi Veijalainen; Valtteri Bottas
- Head coach: Sami Kapanen
- Affiliates: Peliitat
- Website: pelicans.fi
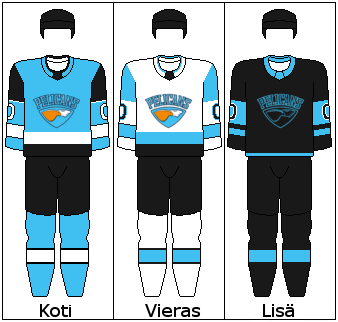

The Lahti Pelicans, commonly referred to as the Lahden Pelicans, are a Finnish professional ice hockey team playing in the Liiga, Finland. Founded in 1996, they play in the city of Lahti at Wemasto Areena. The team is co-owned by (among others) former National Hockey League (NHL) player Pasi Nurminen and Formula One racecar driver Valtteri Bottas.

== History ==

=== Viipurin Reipas (1891–1964) ===
Viipurin Reipas was a sports club located in Vyborg. They won the first ever Finnish Ice Hockey Championship in 1928 with a team consisting mostly of bandy players. After Vyborg was taken from Finland by Soviet Union during the Winter War and again in the Continuation War, the club relocated to Lahti where it continued under its original name until renamed to Lahden Reipas.

=== Lahden Reipas (1964–1975) ===
Reipas spent five seasons in SM-sarja from 1965 to 1970. Their best finish was sixth in 1965–66.

=== Kiekkoreipas (1975–1989) ===
Kiekkoreipas was formed in 1975 to take over hockey operations from Lahden Reipas. They finished top of the league in recently formed First Division in 1975–76 and won promotion to SM-liiga after finishing second in the qualifying series.

Kiekkoreipas spent nine seasons in SM-liiga. In 1978–79 they achieved their highest regular season position, finishing fifth. Their sole playoff appearance came in 1981–82 when they finished sixth and lost to eventual champions Tappara 2–0 in the opening round. After the 1981–82 season, many key players left the club and the team started to gradually fall in the standings. Kiekkoreipas was relegated at the end of the 1984–85 season.

Kiekkoreipas spent four seasons in the First Division and came close to returning to SM-liiga after the 1987–88 season when they lost the best-of-five promotion playoffs to KooKoo 3–2.

=== Hockey Reipas (1989–1992) ===
After the 1988–89 season, a new organization called Hockey Reipas was formed to take over the men’s team from Kiekkoreipas, who continued to take care of junior hockey operations. The 1989–90 season was a success on the ice as the team finished second in the First Division and earned promotion to SM-liiga by beating KooKoo in the playoffs 3–1.

However, the team that won the promotion was an expensive one featuring proven talent such as center Matti Hagman, 1988 Olympic silver medalist Erkki Laine and two World Champions from Czechoslovakia's 1985 team, goaltender Jaromír Šindel and winger Oldřich Válek.

The 1990–91 season was a modest success. Hockey Reipas finished seventh and recorded club records in wins (21) and points (44). The team remained in the playoff contention to the penultimate day of the season, but two major setbacks in the final stages of the season were too big to overcome. First, Šindel suffered a season-ending injury and shortly after, Válek was banned until November for hitting a referee in Turku.

In the spring of 1991, the team's poor financial status was apparent and many key players left the team. Hockey Reipas spent most of the 1991–92 season in the bottom two. However, a season-ending six-game unbeaten streak and a replay win against Tappara was enough to lift the team into tenth place and out of relegation playoffs.

=== Formation of Reipas Lahti and relegation (1992–1994) ===
Hockey Reipas finally went bankrupt after the 1991–92 season. A new organization, titled Reipas Lahti, was quickly formed to take over Hockey Reipas' operations. The new organization was led by chairman Kari Naskinen while Esko Nokelainen remained as a head coach. The unclear situation caused a mass exodus of players during the off-season. Prospects Marko Jantunen and Niko Marttila left for KalPa and HPK, respectively. Goaltender Jaromír Šindel was signed by Tappara. Other notable departures were forwards Tommy Kiviaho and Jyrki Poikolainen and defencemen Teemu Sillanpää and Jarmo Jokilahti.

Despite signing defenceman Jiří Látal from the National Hockey League's Philadelphia Flyers, the 1992–93 season was a disaster, as the team recorded a new league record of 39 losses in 48 games. When Reipas lost the first game of the relegation series against KooKoo, Nokelainen was finally fired from the club. He was replaced by Kari Mäkinen. Reipas went unbeaten for the rest of the series, winning four of the remaining five games. Reipas finished first in the series and secured a place in SM-liiga for the next season.

The 1993–94 off-season saw the departures of another two prospects, defenceman Erik Kakko and centre Toni Sihvonen. Poor finances limited the summer signings, but former crowd favourite Oldřich Válek returned after his two-year spell in Norway. Válek was a shadow of his former self, recording just 2 goals in 17 games before his contract was terminated. Mäkinen continued as a head coach but lasted just seven games, all of which the team lost. He was replaced by Jukka-Ville Jääsalmi, who managed to guide the team to just 14 points in 41 games. The 40 losses in 48 games were a new league record. On relegation series Reipas finished last, marking the end of a four-year spell in the top flight.

=== First division years (1994–1999) ===
After the relegation, the team underwent a massive overhaul. Only a few players from the 1993–94 roster remained and many spots were filled by players from the under-20 team. Russian Sergei Grisintshov was appointed as head coach. 1994–95 season saw the team finish eighth, missing the playoffs.

The following season saw the return of veteran defenceman Kari Eloranta from Rögle BK and a slight improvement on ice as the team finished sixth. Even with improved results, Grisintshov was sacked with just five games remaining of the regular season. He was replaced by Eloranta, who continued as a player-coach. Reipas made the playoffs, but were eliminated in the first round by SaPKo. The public interest was waning and in 1995–96 the average attendance was well below 1,000 per game.

Before the 1996–97 season, the team was renamed to Lahti Pelicans. "Pelican" was adopted as the team mascot and the traditional colours of white, orange and black were abandoned in favour of green and yellow. On ice, the team also continued to improve, finishing third in the regular season with 55 points. A new image and improved results also sparked a new-found interest by the public, as the average attendance rose to over 1,400 per game. In the playoffs, Pelicans were eliminated in the first round by Haukat 3–2.

The 1997–98 season would see another top three finish. In the playoffs, the Pelicans first swept FPS 3–0 and came close to relegating KalPa, losing the best-of-five series 3–2. The final game was decided in overtime.

In 1998–99, the Pelicans finished second with 67 points, 19 points behind the winners Oulun Kärpät. The playoffs were a different story, as Pelicans swept both Hermes and Sport in three games while Kärpät were eliminated by TuTo in the first round. In the final round, the Pelicans beat KalPa 3–0 and were promoted to SM-liiga after a five-year absence. The Pelicans allowed just six goals in nine games during the playoff run. Acquired mid-season, veteran winger Jouko Myrrä scored a team-leading seven goals in the playoffs.

=== Return to SM-liiga (1999–2002) ===
The 1999–2000 season, the team's first season in SM-liiga, would prove to be a difficult one. Despite opening the campaign with two wins, a 17-game winless streak with just three ties followed. The team recorded just eight wins and 24 points in 54 games, finishing last 15 points behind Ässät. On the first round of relegation playoffs, the Pelicans swept Diskos 3–0 and went on to face Oulun Kärpät in the final round. The Pelicans lost the series 3–1 and were relegated. However, their top flight status was restored as the SM-liiga was expanded to 13 teams and closed from promotion.

Despite adding much needed veteran presence to the team, the 2000–01 season started slowly and by late November, the Pelicans was placed second-to-last, just few points ahead of Ässät. A five-game winning streak before Christmas turned the season around and the team finished seventh, securing their second-ever playoff appearance and recording club records in wins (22), ties (11), goals scored (170) and points (55). Journeyman winger Tommi Turunen had a career season with 55 points while Jan Latvala's 35 points were a club record for defenceman.

The 2000–01 postseason would prove out to be short as Pelicans lost 3–0 to TPS, who would eventually win their third straight championship.

The 2001–02 season saw a strong start for the team as they went nine games unbeaten and topped the league. The Pelicans could not maintain the momentum throughout the season, finishing fifth, and tying the club record for highest ever SM-liiga finish. The team also set new club records in wins (31) and points (68). Mikko Peltola's 38 assists were a new club record.

In the playoffs, the Pelicans were eliminated by TPS 3–1, but managed to record club's first ever playoff win by winning Game 2 in overtime by Toni Koivunen's goal.

=== Financial troubles (2002–2005) ===
After the successful 2001–02 season, six of the ten leading scorers and head coach Kari Eloranta left the team. His replacement was his former assistant coach, Petteri Hirvonen. The following season 2002–03 saw a turn for the worse as the Pelicans finished second-to-last with 36 points, seven points ahead of bottom-placed Ilves.

The 2003–04 season started dismally and on October 22, 2003, after just two wins and four ties in 15 games, Hirvonen was fired. He was replaced by his assistant coach, Petteri Sihvonen, who led the team to just five regulation time wins in 41 games. The Pelicans finished last, nine points behind SaiPa. Dwindling attendance and dire financial straits led to the wholesale of key players during the season and finally in February 2004, the club applied for debt restructuring.

Defenceman Erik Kakko returned for the 2004–05 season, but the team did not fare any better. Under the guidance of rookie coach, Petri Matikainen, the team finished last for the second time in a row, recording just seven regulation time wins in 56 games. In April 2005, finally saw the arrival of new ownership led by Pasi Nurminen, who had played 16 games for the Pelicans during the season due to the 2004–05 NHL lockout.

=== Return to playoffs (2005–2009) ===
Matikainen left Pelicans after just one season and he was replaced by Jami Kauppi. Despite stronger financial situation, the team continued to under perform and on October 26, 2005, Kauppi was fired after recording just 2 wins in 16 games. He was first replaced by general manager Ilkka Kaarna and on January 7, 2006, by former Finland national team head coach Hannu Aravirta. Coaching changes turned the 2005–06 season around, but a strong second half wasn't enough to lift the team into the playoffs. The Pelicans finished 12th, five points adrift of the last playoff spot.

The 2006–07 season saw the return of Marko Jantunen as well as a return to playoffs after a five-year absence. The Pelicans finished tenth and recorded their first ever playoff series win by beating TPS in the preliminary round 2–0. During the quarter-finals, they were eliminated in four-straight games by eventual champions Kärpät. The Pelicans managed to score just two goals in the series. Jantunen lead the team in scoring with 41 points alongside centre Matias Loppi.

During the 2007–08 season, the Pelicans set new records in wins (33), goals scored (176), fewest goals against (142) and total points (98), finishing sixth and earning a place in the quarter-finals. Their quarter-final match-up was Jokerit, who went on to win the best-of-seven series in six games. After the season, starting goalie Antti Niemi signed with NHL's Chicago Blackhawks. Loppi set new club records in points (58) and assists (40).

After losing key players Niemi and Loppi, the 2008–09 season started slowly. A second-half surge was enough to land the team ninth, securing a third consecutive playoff appearance. During the preliminary round, the Pelicans eliminated Ilves in three games. The last game was decided in overtime by Olli Julkunen's goal as the Pelicans won 3–2. During the quarterfinals, the Pelicans lost the series to the Espoo Blues 3–4, despite leading the series 3–2.

=== Out of playoffs (2009–2011) ===
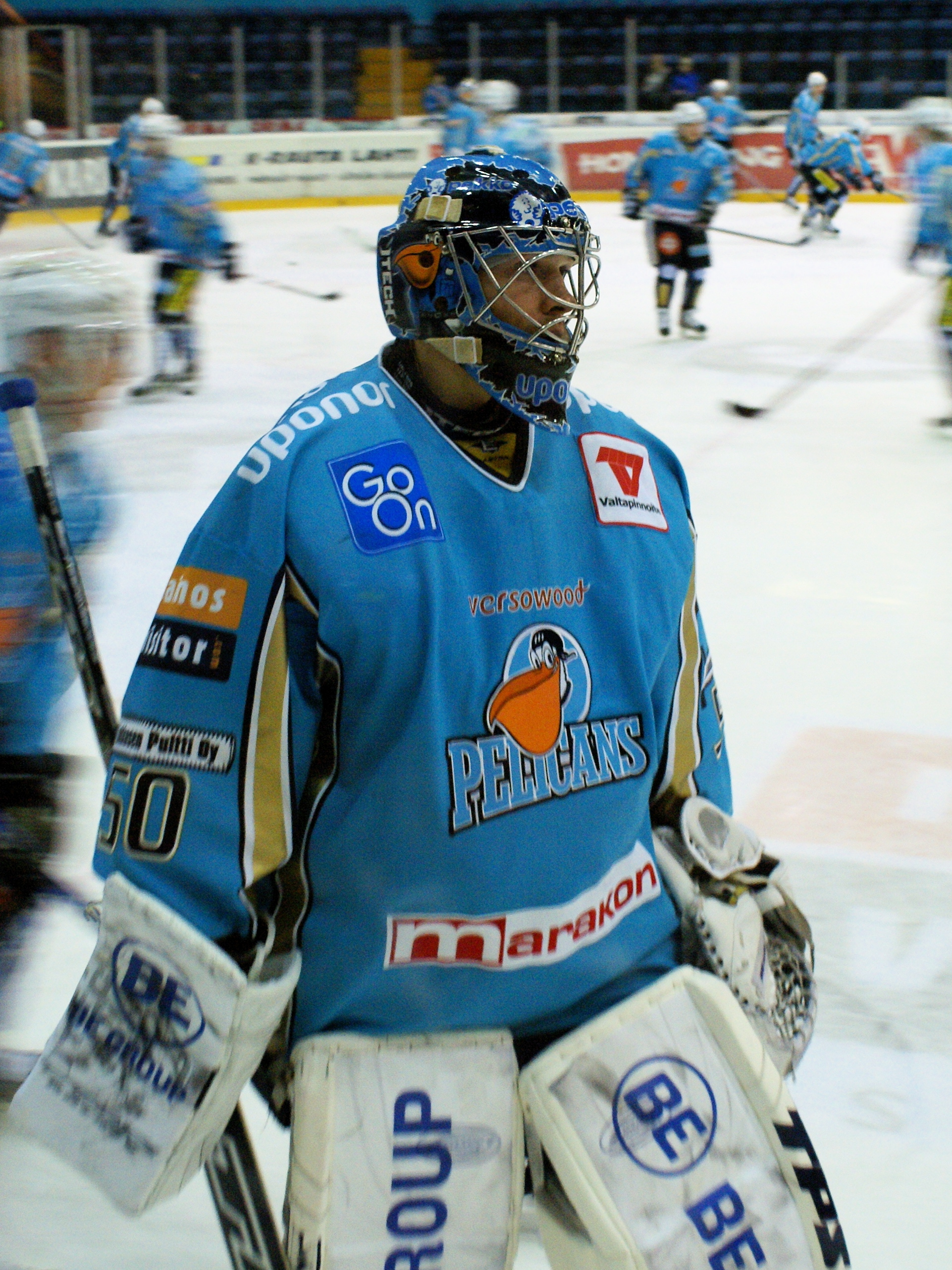
Tommi Nikkilä was the Pelicans goaltender from 2008 to 2010

Aravirta left the Pelicans after the 2008–09 season. His replacement was Mika Toivola, who had led Ässät to the finals in 2006. The 2009–10 season saw the team miss the playoffs for the first time since 2006, finishing 12th. Summer acquisition Juhamatti Aaltonen led the league in goals scored with 28. The season would also prove to be the last for many veteran players such as Marko Jantunen, Erik Kakko and Toni Koivunen.

The start of the 2010–11 season saw the team struggling under the guidance of Toivola despite a number of high-profile summer signings such as NHL veteran Mike York, Dwight Helminen, Matias Loppi and defenceman Jyri Marttinen. Finally, after a six-game losing streak, Toivola was terminated on October 24, 2010. His replacement was assistant coach Pasi Räsänen. Despite a promising start with two wins in the first three games, Räsänen failed to turn the team around and during November, with starting goaltender Niko Hovinen injured, the Pelicans recorded a nine-game losing streak. The Pelicans finished last with 59 points, just one point adrift of safety. During the relegation playoffs, they beat Vaasan Sport in four-straight games.

=== First medal (2011–2012) ===
Räsänen's contract was not renewed for the next season. The Pelicans' initial choice was Kari Jalonen, but he opted to coach in the Kontinental Hockey League instead. Finally, Kai Suikkanen, who had won the championship with TPS in 2010, was recruited as head coach on March 30, 2011.

The 2011–12 season would prove out to be by far the most successful season by that point. The team finished second and set new club records in points (111), wins (39) and goals scored (213). Forward Ryan Lasch led the league in scoring with 62 points and Markus Seikola's 16 goals were a league high for defencemen.

In the quarter-finals, the Pelicans met Kärpät, but despite winning the first game 5–0, they lost three-straight and were facing elimination. The Pelicans rebounded with a 4–2 home win in game 5. Game 6 in Oulu was decided in overtime by Radek Smoleňák's goal. A late- season acquisition, Smoleňák scored the game-winning goal also in Game 7 as the Pelicans won 3–2 and advanced to semi-finals for the first time in club history.

In the semi-finals, the Pelicans defeated Blues in five games to earn a place in the finals against JYP. The Pelicans started the series with a 2–0 home win, but lost the following four games as JYP won their second championship in three years. The final two games of the series were decided in overtime. Lasch lead the league also in playoff scoring with 16 points in 17 games. Smolenak's eight goals tied him alongside team captain Arttu Luttinen in the lead for goals scored.

=== Decline (2012–2015) ===
During the 2012–13 off-season, the team saw a mass exodus of key players, three of whom left for the NHL: defenceman Joonas Järvinen signed with the Nashville Predators, Lasch left for the Anaheim Ducks and goaltender Niko Hovinen joined the Philadelphia Flyers. Other notable departures were Arttu Luttinen and centres Justin Hodgman and Tero Koskiranta. Pelicans' summer signings included two former NHL first-round draft picks: centres Angelo Esposito and Ryan O'Marra, journeyman winger Lee Goren and defenceman Danny Richmond. None of the acquisitions finished the entire 2012–13 season with Pelicans.

During the 2012–13 season, Pelicans was at the bottom of the table with Ilves. A strong second half saw the team move back into playoff contention. They were eliminated from the playoffs on the last day of the season, finishing 11th.

After the season, Suikkanen left for TPS and he was replaced with Hannu Aravirta. The 2013–14 season started strongly, and with just 1 overtime loss in 11 games as Pelicans topped the league. However, an 11-game losing streak around Christmas saw the team to fall out of the playoff spots. Another turnaround followed and just six regulation time losses in 25 final games were enough to land the team eighth place, which guaranteed a return to playoffs after a one-year absence.

Pelicans beat HIFK in the preliminary round 2–0. Both games were decided in overtime. In the quarter-finals, Tappara would prove to be too strong an opponent, winning the best-of-seven series in six games.

The 2014–15 season saw yet another head coach change as Aravirta was replaced by Tomi Lämsä. The team struggled with injuries throughout the season and when being out of playoff contention by February, key players like centres Tyler Redenbach and Tommi Paakkolanvaara and wingers Michal Řepík and Jordan Smotherman were released in order to cut financial losses. Pelicans finally finished 12th with 68 points. The poor showing cost Lämsä his position as he was fired just days after the regular season ended.

=== Resurgence (2015–2019) ===
After Lämsä was fired, Petri Matikainen was appointed as a new head coach with a three-year contract on March 16, 2015. Pasi Nurminen joined the coaching staff as an assistant coach.

The 2015–16 season saw the Pelicans climb back to playoff contention as they finished ninth with 89 points, a 21-point improvement from previous season. NHL veteran Ryan Potulny led the team in scoring with 36 points while Juha Leimu's 18 goals were a league-high for defencemen.

The regular season was filled with controversy, as multiple players from Pelicans earned suspensions during the season. Defenceman Ben Blood was suspended for a total of 15 games for five incidents, while winger Dane Byers was suspended for a total of seven games for two separate incidents.

The Pelicans eliminated KalPa in the opening round of the playoffs 2–1, despite losing the series opener in overtime, and went on to face regular season leaders HIFK in the quarter-finals. After trailing the series 2–0, the Pelicans tied the series with a 4–2 away win in Game 3 and an overtime win at home in Game 4. The Pelicans were eliminated when HIFK won the next two games, both ending 2–1.

The steady improvement continued in the 2016–17 season, as Pelicans finished sixth with 93 points. The season saw the return of many familiar players as Justin Hodgman, Karri Rämö, Mikko Kousa and Antti Tyrväinen were all signed during the season. However, injuries limited Hodgman to 26 and Kousa to 20 appearances. The playoffs turned out disappointing as Pelicans were eliminated 4–1 in the quarter-finals by KalPa. To add further controversy, captain Antti Erkinjuntti and Hodgman were healthy scratches in Game 5.

In 2017-18 the team made their third consecutive playoff appearance despite falling to 10th place with 83 points. Pelicans were eliminated in the opening round by SaiPa in three games. Matikainen left after the season as his contract expired. He was replaced by former Stanley Cup winner Ville Nieminen as the new head coach on April 10, 2018.

On March 3, 2018, the Pelicans announced a partnership with the Finnish esports organization ENCE. This was announced as ENCE revealed the signing of the Counter-Strike: Global Offensive player allu.

2018-19 saw the team achieve their second-highest position and point totals as they finished third with 104 points. The finish also saw the team qualify for the Champions Hockey League for the first time. Defenseman Oliwer Kaski led the team in scoring with 19 goals, 32 assists and 51 points, each a new club record for a defenseman. He would sign with the NHL's Detroit Red Wings in the summer. Pelicans were however disappointed in the quarterfinals as they were eliminated by HIFK in six games, despite two blowout home wins in Game 1 and Game 5.

=== Current era (2019-) ===
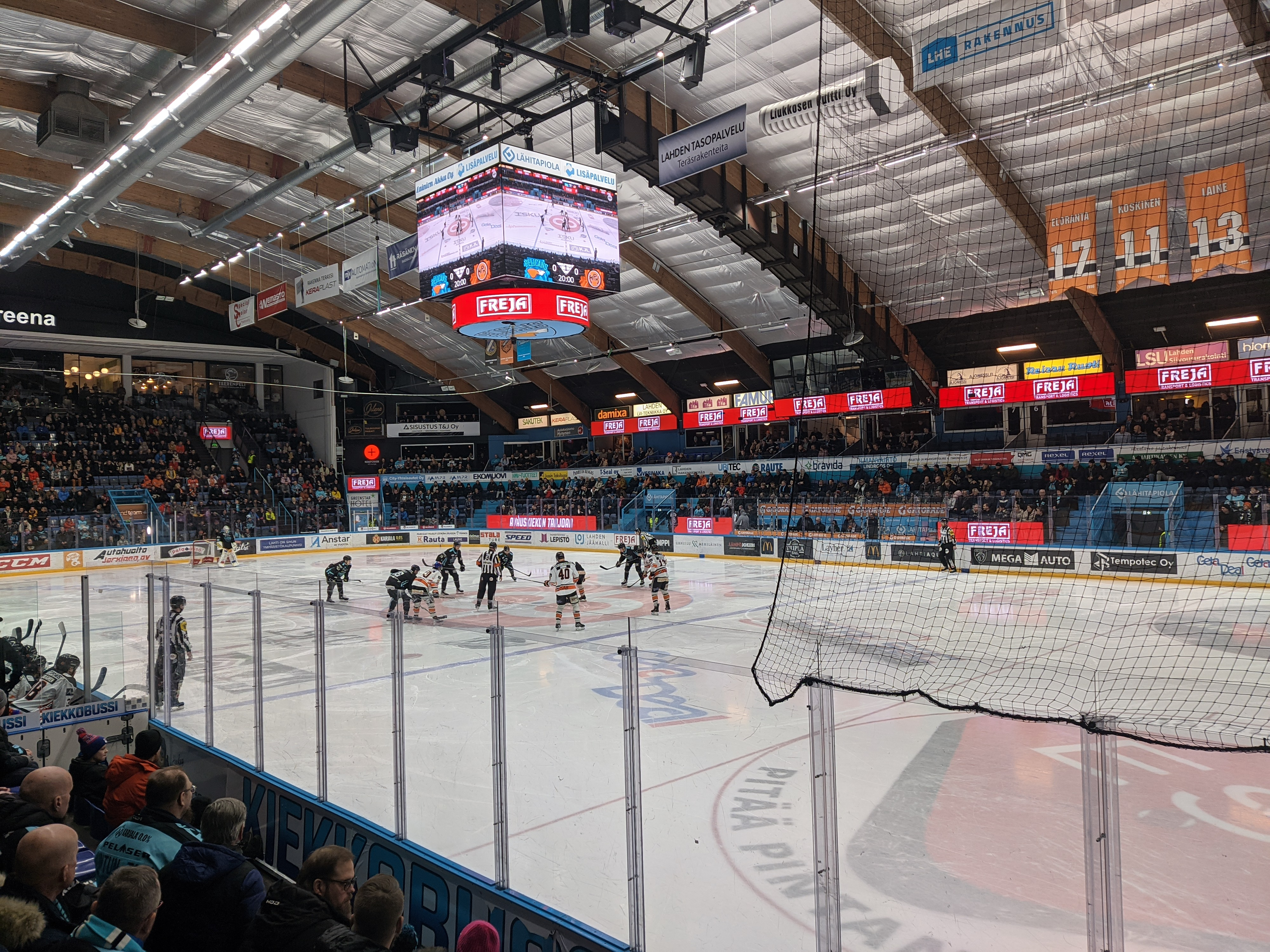
Pelicans-HPK in 2023-24 season

During the season, Nieminen's contract status was under heavy speculation and he was finally extended on April 12, 2019. Alongside Kaski, Pelicans suffered notable departures as key players such as Jesse Saarinen, Mikko Kousa and Hynek Zohorna left the team. In the CHL, Pelicans failed to qualify from the group stage. In the 2019-20 Liiga, the team started to fall gradually in the standings after a promising start and finally after a disappointing run of just four wins in 16 games, Nieminen was fired from the club on November 30, 2019. He was replaced by his assistant coach, Jesse Welling. The change had little effect and when the season was cancelled with one day left of the regular season due to COVID-19 pandemic the Pelicans were 14th, five points ahead of bottom-placed Vaasan Sport.

== Season records ==
This is a partial list of seasons completed by the Pelicans. For the full season-by-season history, see List of SM-liiga seasons

| Season | Games | Won | Lost | OTW | T/OTL | Points | Goals for | Goals against | Rank | Postseason |
|---|---|---|---|---|---|---|---|---|---|---|
| 1999–00 | 56 | 8 | 38 | — | 8 | 24 | 108 | 197 | 12 | Saved in relegation, 1–3 (Kärpät) |
| 2000–01 | 56 | 22 | 23 | — | 11 | 55 | 170 | 164 | 7 | Lost quarter-final, 0–3 (TPS) |
| 2001–02 | 56 | 27 | 19 | 4 | 2 | 68 | 157 | 152 | 5 | Lost quarter-final, 1–3 (TPS) |
| 2002–03 | 56 | 13 | 35 | 2 | 4 | 36 | 120 | 181 | 12 | Out of Playoffs |
| 2003–04 | 56 | 7 | 37 | 1 | 11 | 27 | 110 | 227 | 14 | Out of Playoffs |
| 2004–05 | 56 | 7 | 36 | 3 | 10 | 37 | 100 | 230 | 14 | Out of Playoffs |
| 2005–06 | 56 | 18 | 29 | 4 | 5 | 67 | 125 | 171 | 12 | Out of Playoffs |
| 2006–07 | 56 | 19 | 24 | 7 | 6 | 77 | 147 | 151 | 10 | Lost quarter-final, 0–4 (Kärpät) |
| 2007–08 | 56 | 28 | 19 | 5 | 4 | 98 | 176 | 142 | 6 | Lost quarter-final, 2–4 (Jokerit) |
| 2008–09 | 58 | 22 | 27 | 4 | 5 | 80 | 149 | 145 | 9 | Lost quarter-final, 3–4 (Espoo Blues) |
| 2009–10 | 58 | 18 | 27 | 6 | 7 | 73 | 166 | 197 | 12 | Out of Playoffs |
| 2010–11 | 60 | 17 | 37 | 2 | 4 | 59 | 133 | 180 | 14 | Saved in relegation, 4–0 (Vaasan Sport) |
| 2011–12 | 60 | 30 | 18 | 9 | 3 | 111 | 213 | 155 | 2 | Lost final, 1–4 (JYP) |
| 2012–13 | 60 | 22 | 28 | 7 | 3 | 83 | 163 | 180 | 11 | Out of Playoffs |
| 2013–14 | 60 | 25 | 24 | 6 | 5 | 92 | 156 | 155 | 8 | Lost quarter-final, 2–4 (Tappara) |
| 2014–15 | 60 | 16 | 30 | 6 | 8 | 68 | 125 | 166 | 12 | Out of Playoffs |
| 2015–16 | 60 | 24 | 25 | 4 | 7 | 89 | 145 | 171 | 9 | Lost quarter-final, 2–4 (HIFK) |
| 2016–17 | 60 | 23 | 21 | 8 | 8 | 93 | 157 | 150 | 6 | Lost quarter-final, 1–4 (KalPa) |
| 2017–18 | 60 | 20 | 24 | 7 | 9 | 83 | 165 | 175 | 10 | Lost first round, 1–2 (SaiPa) |
| 2018–19 | 60 | 30 | 19 | 3 | 8 | 104 | 199 | 154 | 5 | Lost quarter-final, 2–4 (HIFK) |
| 2019–20 | 59 | 12 | 36 | 7 | 4 | 54 | 120 | 201 | 14 | Cancelled due to COVID19 |
| 2020–21 | 58 | 25 | 21 | 10 | 2 | 97 | 169 | 147 | 6 | Lost quarter-final, 2–3 (TPS) |
| 2021–22 | 60 | 25 | 21 | 4 | 10 | 93 | 142 | 142 | 9 | Lost first round, 1–2 (KooKoo) |
| 2022–23 | 60 | 30 | 21 | 4 | 5 | 103 | 166 | 136 | 2 | Lost final, 1–4 (Tappara) |
| 2023–24 | 60 | 31 | 17 | 4 | 8 | 109 | 177 | 147 | 3 | Lost final, 1–4 (Tappara) |
| 2024–25 | 60 | 20 | 4 | 7 | 29 | 75 | 171 | 149 | 16 | Saved in relegation, 4–1 (Jokerit) |
| 2025–26 | 60 | 20 | 9 | 7 | 24 | 85 | 137 | 156 | 11 | Lost quarter-final, 1–4 (KooKoo) |
| 2026–27 | | | | | | | | | | |

== Honours ==
=== Runners-up ===
- (silver) SM-liiga Kanada-malja (3): 2012, 2023, 2024

=== European titles ===
- (gold) Energie Steiermark Trophy (1): 2017

Other awards for the club:

- Was promoted from I-Divisioona to the top league, (it was the second level of ice hockey in Finland): 1975–76, 1989–90, 1998–99

=== Pre-season ===
Tatra Cup

- (gold) Winners (1): 2016

== Players ==
=== Current roster ===
Updated 8 February 2025

| No. | Nat | Player | Pos | S/G | Age | Acquired | Birthplace |
|---|---|---|---|---|---|---|---|
| 9 | (Czech Republic) | Adam Bareš | F | R | 22 | 2024 | Slaný, Czech Republic |
| 32 | (Czech Republic) | Patrik Bartošák | G | L | 33 | 2024 | Kopřivnice, Czech Republic |
| 2 | (Sweden) | Lars Bryggman (A) | LW | L | 33 | 2022 | Umeå, Sweden |
| 72 | (Sweden) | Patrik Carlsson | LW | L | 38 | 2023 | Kungälv, Sweden |
| 62 | (Finland) | Jonas Enlund | LW | L | 38 | 2022 | Helsinki, Finland |
| 78 | (Sweden) | Hampus Falk | D | L | 29 | 2024 | Örnsköldsvik, Sweden |
| 20 | (Finland) | Konsta Hirvonen | C | L | 25 | 2021 | Vantaa, Finland |
| 16 | (Czech Republic) | Luboš Horký | RW | R | 28 | 2023 | Znojmo, Czech Republic |
| 47 | (Czech Republic) | Michal Jordán (A) | D | L | 36 | 2023 | Zlín, Czechoslovakia |
| 7 | (Canada) | Wyatt Kalynuk | D | L | 29 | 2024 | Brandon, Manitoba, Canada |
| 3 | (Finland) | Iikka Kangasniemi | LW | L | 31 | 2024 | Oulu, Finland |
| 6 | (Finland) | Joona Kumpula | C | L | 23 | 2024 | Helsinki, Finland |
| 68 | (Finland) | Rasmus Kumpulainen | C | L | 21 | 2024 | Lahti, Finland |
| 44 | (Finland) | Onni Käyhkö | D | L | 24 | 2023 | Vääksy, Finland |
| 19 | (United States) | Ryan Lasch | RW | R | 39 | 2023 | Lake Forest, California, United States |
| 92 | (Canada) | Josh Lawrence | C | R | 24 | 2024 | Fredericton, New Brunswick, Canada |
| 30 | (Sweden) | Olof Lindbom | G | L | 26 | 2024 | Stockholm, Sweden |
| 88 | (Sweden) | Tim Lindfors | RW | R | 23 | 2024 | Kalmar, Sweden |
| 87 | (Finland) | Daniel Nieminen | D | L | 20 | 2024 | Lahti, Finland |
| 55 | (Finland) | Petteri Riihinen | D | R | 25 | 2022 | Mäntsälä, Finland |
| 18 | (Finland) | Miika Roine (C) | LW | L | 34 | 2020 | Laukaa, Finland |
| 71 | (Finland) | Leevi Tukiainen | F | R | 26 | 2021 | Lahti, Finland |
| 89 | (Finland) | Antti Tyrväinen (A) | W | L | 37 | 2023 | Seinäjoki, Finland |
| 91 | (Finland) | Elias Vilén | F | L | 25 | 2020 | Lahti, Finland |
| 29 | (Finland) | Miro Väänänen | C | L | 27 | 2024 | Joensuu, Finland |

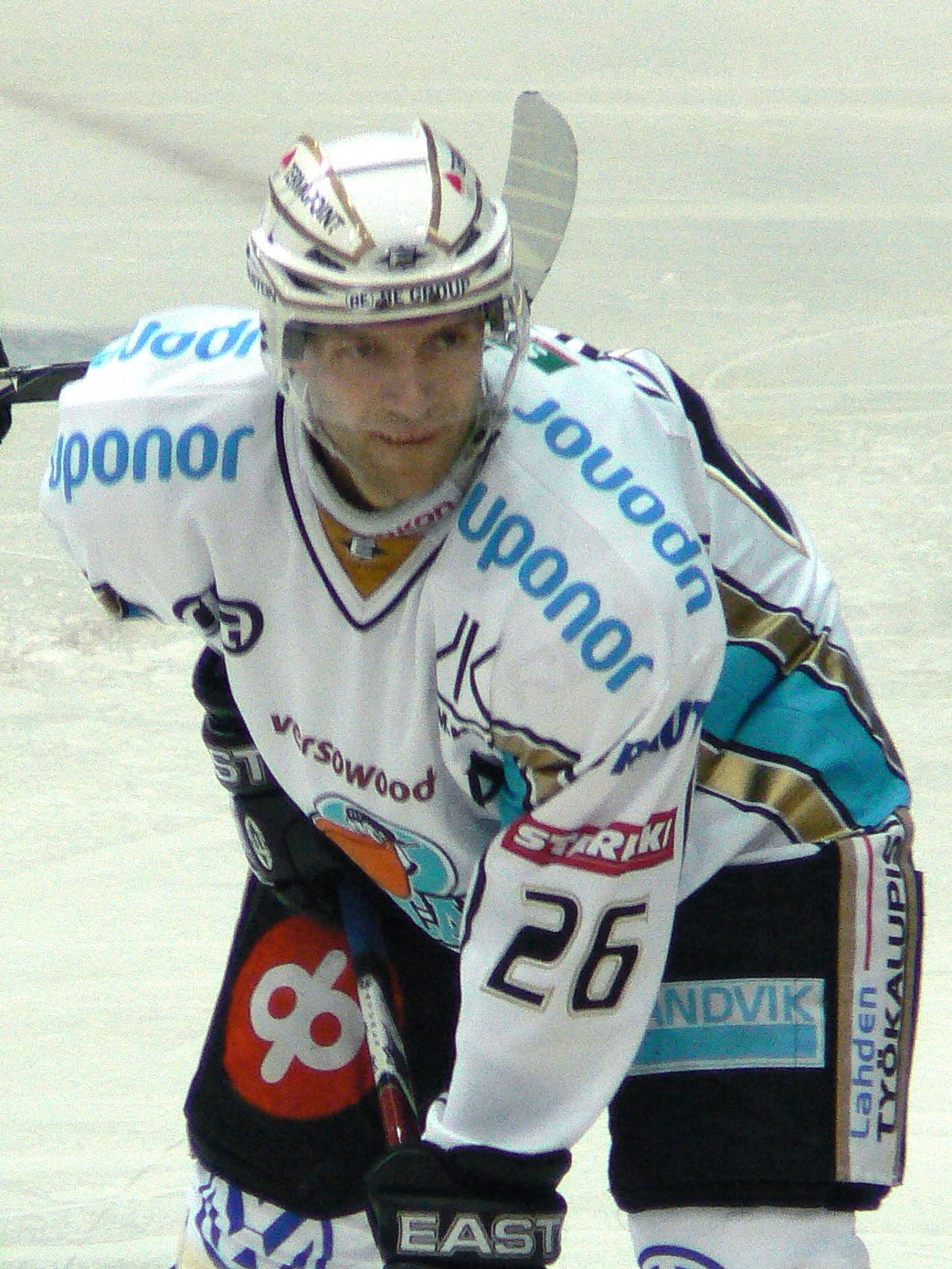
Jan Latvala was Pelicans captain for season 2010–11

=== Team captains ===
- Ilpo Koskela (1976–77)
- Matti Kaario (1977–81)
- Olavi Niemenranta (1981–82)
- Erkki Laine (1982–84, 1990–94)
- Hannu Koskinen (1984–85)
- Kimmo Nyman (1985–87)
- Jarkko Piiparinen (1987–90)
- Sami Wikström (1994–96)
- Tony Grönroos (1996–98)
- Kimmo Peltonen (1998–99)
- Mika Niskanen (1999–01)
- Toni Koivunen (2001–02, 2004–05)
- Jari Kauppila (2002–04)
- Erik Kakko (2005–10)
- Jan Latvala (2010–11)
- Arttu Luttinen (2011–12)
- Tommi Paakkolanvaara (2012–2014)
- Juha Leimu (2014–2015)
- Antti Erkinjuntti (2015–2017)
- Stefan Lassen (2017–18)
- Hannes Bjorninen (2018–2021)
- Joonas Jalvanti (2021–2022)
- Miika Roine (2022–)

=== NHL alumni ===
- Sean Avery
- Zdeněk Blatný
- Timo Blomqvist
- Jason Bonsignore
- Filip Chlapík
- Carl Corazzini
- Kari Eloranta
- Lee Goren
- Richard Grenier
- Kari Haakana
- Matti Hagman
- Sami Helenius
- Dwight Helminen
- Julius Honka
- Marko Jantunen
- Jonas Junland
- Leo Komarov
- Filip Král
- Brad Lambert
- Marc Lamothe
- Janne Laukkanen
- Toni Lydman
- Jamie McBain
- Antti Niemi
- Petteri Nummelin
- Pasi Nurminen
- Ryan O'Marra
- Grigorijs Panteļejevs
- Ondřej Pavelec
- Ilkka Pikkarainen
- Lasse Pirjetä
- Timo Pärssinen
- Borna Rendulić
- Michal Řepík
- Danny Richmond
- Pavel Rosa
- Karri Rämö
- Jiří Smejkal
- Radek Smoleňák
- Jordan Smotherman
- Libor Šulák
- Shayne Toporowski
- Roman Vopat
- William (Bill) Whelton
- Mike York
- Jesse Ylönen

=== Retired numbers ===
- 11 – Hannu Koskinen
- 13 – Erkki Laine
- 17 – Kari Eloranta

== Coaches ==
- Head coach – Petri Matikainen
- Coach – Mikko Saarinen
- Goalkeeper coach – Pasi Nurminen
- Video coach – Simo Vehviläinen

=== List of head coaches ===
- Unto Viitala 1960–1964
- Esko Luostarinen 1964–1968
- Erkki Mononen 1968–1969
- Heljo Liesmäki 1969–1970
- Juhani Vuorela 1970–1972
- Aulis Hirvonen 1972–1976
- Matti Lampainen 1976–1978
- Veli-Pekka Roiha 1978–1981
- Matti Koivunen 1981–1982 (fired on November 20, 1982)
- Pertti Mantere 1982–1984 (fired on March 2, 1984)
- Veli-Pekka Roiha 1984
- Lasse Väliaho 1984–1985
- Veli-Pekka Roiha 1985–1986 (fired on November 21, 1986)
- Yrjö Hakulinen 1986–1987
- Kari Malinen 1987–1988 (fired on December 19, 1988)
- Seppo Repo 1988–1989
- Esko Nokelainen 1989–1993 (fired on March 9, 1993)
- Kari Mäkinen 1993 (fired on October 3, 1993)
- Jukka-Ville Jääsalmi 1993–1994
- Sergei Grišintšov 1994–1996 (fired on January 31, 1996)
- Kari Eloranta 1996–2002
- Petteri Hirvonen 2002–2003 (fired on October 22, 2003)
- Petteri Sihvonen 2003–2004
- Petri Matikainen 2004–2005
- Jami Kauppi 2005 (fired on October 26, 2005)
- Ilkka Kaarna 2005 (caretaker head coach from October 26, 2005 to November 3, 2005)
- Pasi Räsänen 2005–2006 (Caretaker head coach before Aravirta. As of January 7, 2006)
- Hannu Aravirta 2006–2009
- Mika Toivola 2009–2010 (fired on October 24, 2010)
- Pasi Räsänen 2010–2011
- Kai Suikkanen 2011–2013
- Hannu Aravirta 2013–2014
- Tomi Lämsä 2014–2015 (fired on March 14, 2015)
- Petri Matikainen 2015–2018
- Ville Nieminen 2018–2019 (fired on November 30, 2019)
- Jesse Welling 2019–2020
- Tommi Niemelä 2020–2024

== See also ==
- Peliitat
