= Jiří Hanzlík =

Czech ice hockey player (born 1974)

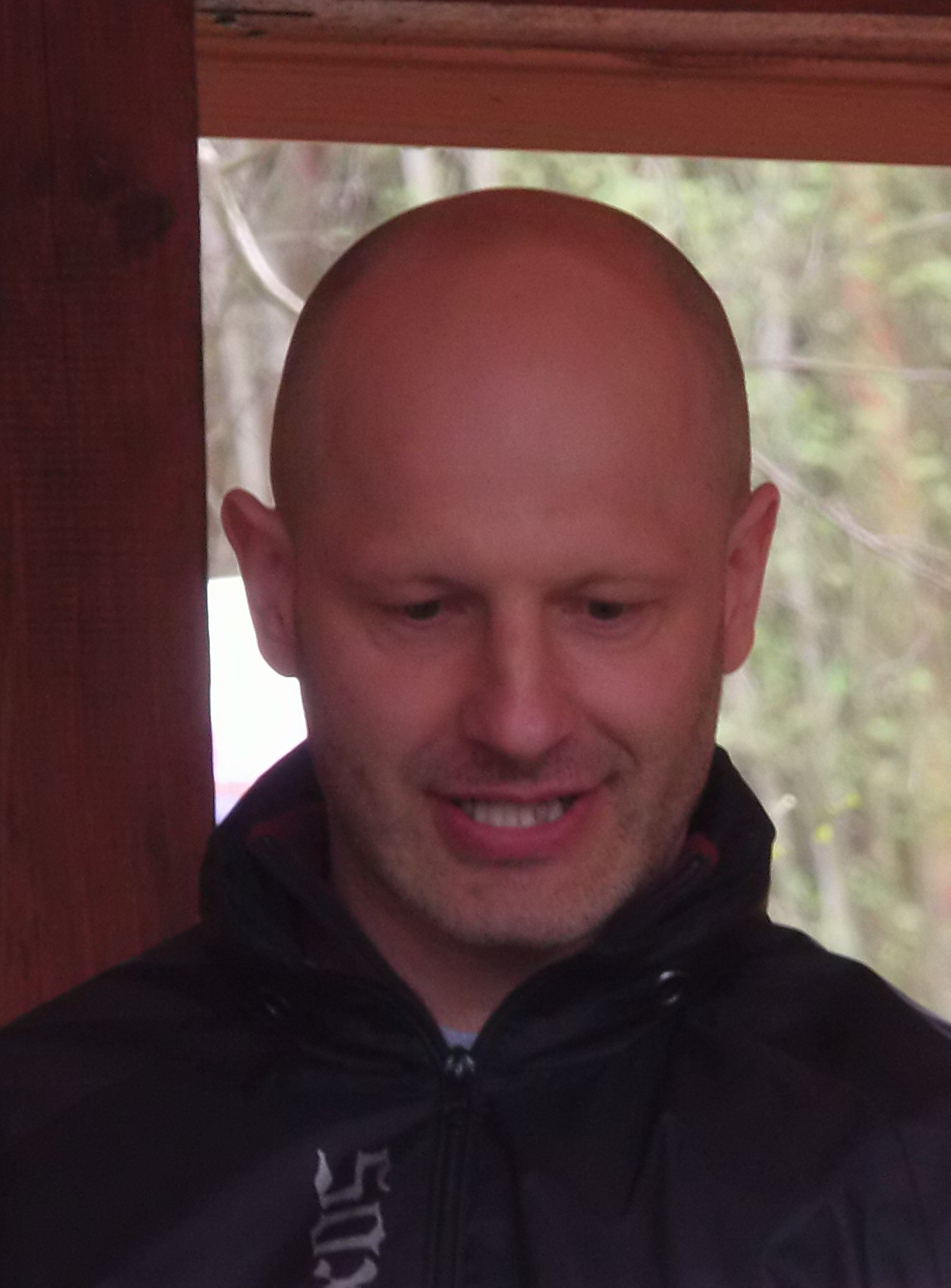
- Born: February 2, 1974 (age 52) Rokycany, Czechoslovakia
- Height: 5 ft 11 in (180 cm)
- Weight: 190 lb (86 kg; 13 st 8 lb)
- Position: Defence
- Shot: Left
- Played for: HC Plzeň; Bílí Tygři Liberec; HC Slovan Ústečtí Lvi; HC Energie Karlovy Vary
- NHL draft: Undrafted
- Playing career: 1992–2014

Jiří Hanzlík (born February 2, 1974) is a Czech professional ice hockey defenceman. He competed with HC Plzeň in the Czech Extraliga during the 2010–11 season.

Prior to his tenure with HC Plzeň, Hanzlík played for HC Bílí Tygři Liberec and HC Energie Karlovy Vary.

== Career statistics ==
			Regular season					Playoffs
Season	Team	League	GP	G	A	Pts	PIM	GP	G	A	Pts	PIM
1990–91	HC Rokycany U20	Czechoslovakia U20	40	14	23	37	—	—	—	—	—	—
1991–92	HC Rokycany U20	Czechoslovakia U20	30	13	12	25	—	—	—	—	—	—
1992–93	HC Plzen	Czechoslovakia	30	1	5	6	0	—	—	—	—	—
1993–94	HC Plzen	Czech	34	1	7	8	24	—	—	—	—	—
1994–95	HC Plzen	Czech	20	1	5	6	14	3	0	0	0	2
1995–96	HC Plzen	Czech	36	2	3	5	49	3	0	0	0	2
1996–97	HC Plzen	Czech	39	3	7	10	24	—	—	—	—	—
1997–98	HC Plzen	Czech	42	1	14	15	16	3	0	1	1	2
1998–99	HC Plzen	Czech	49	8	10	18	34	—	—	—	—	—
1999–00	HC Plzen	Czech	48	4	10	14	38	7	0	1	1	8
2000–01	HC Plzen	Czech	51	5	14	19	36	—	—	—	—	—
2001–02	HC Plzen	Czech	43	1	13	14	44	6	0	2	2	4
2002–03	HC Plzen	Czech	16	1	3	4	31	—	—	—	—	—
2002–03	Bílí Tygři Liberec	Czech	27	3	4	7	57	—	—	—	—	—
2002–03	HC Slovan Ústečtí Lvi	Czech2	1	1	1	2	2	—	—	—	—	—
2003–04	HC Plzen	Czech	35	0	8	8	24	—	—	—	—	—
2003–04	Bílí Tygři Liberec	Czech	16	1	2	3	14	—	—	—	—	—
2004–05	Bílí Tygři Liberec	Czech	44	1	9	10	72	12	1	3	4	10
2005–06	Bílí Tygři Liberec	Czech	45	3	3	6	48	5	0	1	1	18
2006–07	HC Energie Karlovy Vary	Czech	52	4	0	4	58	3	0	0	0	2
2007–08	HC Energie Karlovy Vary	Czech	43	8	5	13	38	19	1	1	2	18
2008–09	HC Energie Karlovy Vary	Czech	32	1	7	8	26	—	—	—	—	—
2009–10	HC Plzeň 1929	Czech	51	8	13	21	64	6	0	2	2	6
2010–11	HC Plzeň 1929	Czech	51	7	19	26	30	4	0	2	2	8
2011–12	HC Plzeň 1929	Czech	43	5	7	12	32	8	2	1	3	12
2012–13	HC Plzeň	Czech	41	2	12	14	34	17	3	1	4	6
2013–14	HC Plzeň	Czech	39	3	8	11	22	6	0	2	2	12
Czech totals			897	73	183	256	829	102	7	17	24	110
