= Kari Sihvonen =

Finnish ice hockey player

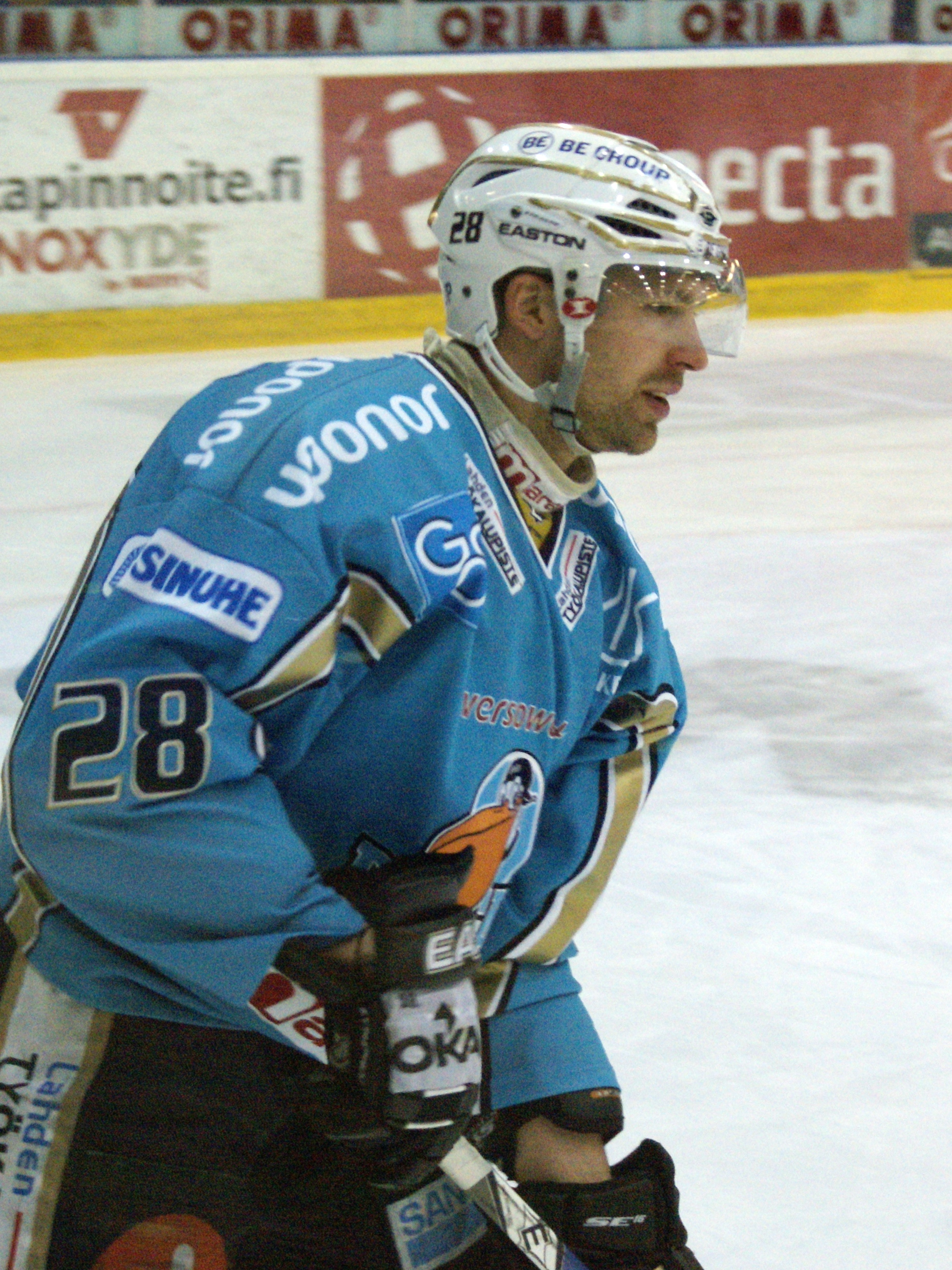
- Born: June 9, 1983 (age 43) Olofstrom, Sweden
- Height: 5 ft 11 in (180 cm)
- Weight: 198 lb (90 kg; 14 st 2 lb)
- Position: Left wing
- Shoots: Left
- KAZ team Former teams: Arystan Temirtau; Espoo Blues; HPK; Lahti Pelicans; Beibarys Atyrau; Yertis Pavlodar
- NHL draft: Undrafted
- Playing career: 2002–present

Kari Sihvonen (born June 9, 1983) is a Finnish professional ice hockey forward who currently plays for Arystan Temirtau of the Kazakhstan Hockey Championship.
