= Matias Loppi =

Finnish ice hockey player

- Born: 22 March 1980 (age 45) Helsinki, Finland
- Height: 6 ft 0 in (183 cm)
- Weight: 196 lb (89 kg; 14 st 0 lb)
- Position: Forward
- Shot: Left
- Played for: SM-liiga; Pelicans; HIFK; HPK; SaiPa; Serie A SV Caldaro; DEL; Hamburg Freezers; Mestis; KJT; Kiekko-Vantaa; KooKoo; HockeyAllsvenskan; Piteå HC
- NHL draft: Undrafted
- Playing career: 1998–2013

Matias Loppi (22 March 1980) is a Finnish former professional ice hockey forward who last played for SV Caldaro of the italian Serie A2.
