= Antti Tyrväinen (ice hockey) =

Finnish ice hockey player (born 1989)

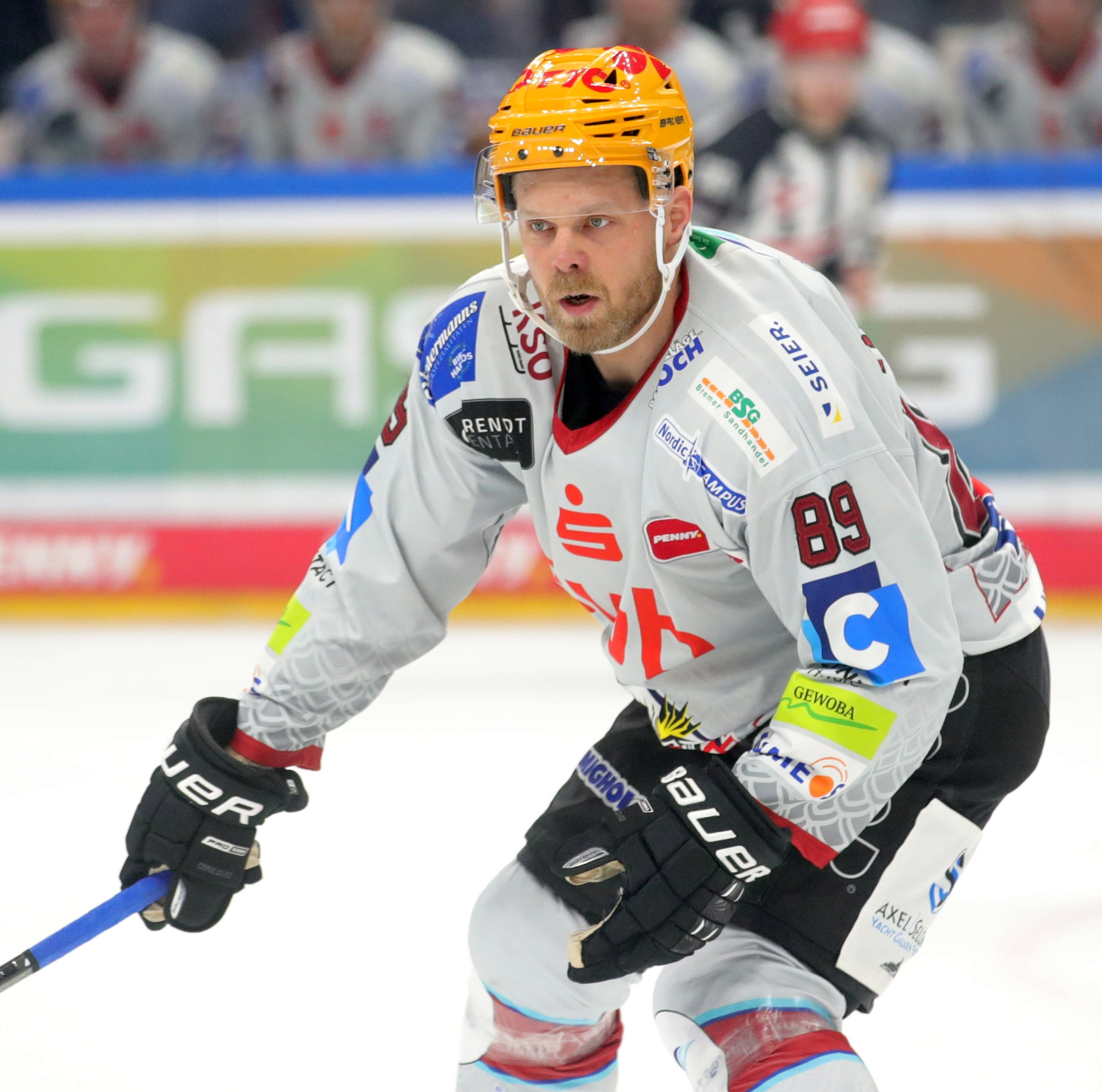
- Tyrväinen in 2022
- Born: April 3, 1989 (age 37) Seinäjoki, Finland
- Height: 5 ft 11 in (180 cm)
- Weight: 196 lb (89 kg; 14 st 0 lb)
- Position: Forward
- Shoots: Left
- Liiga team Former teams: JYP Jyväskylä; Pelicans; Oklahoma City Barons; Jokerit; Ilves; Färjestad BK; HIFK; Fischtown Pinguins
- National team: Finland
- NHL draft: Undrafted
- Playing career: 2008–present

Antti Tyrväinen (born April 3, 1989) is a Finnish ice hockey player who currently plays for JYP of the Finnish Liiga.

On June 15, 2011, it was announced that the Edmonton Oilers had signed Tyrvainen as an undrafted free agent, to a two-year entry-level contract, and he played two season with the Oklahoma City Barons of the American Hockey League (AHL). He previously played for Tampereen Ilves of the SM-liiga.

Antti's brother Juhani Tyrväinen also plays professionally with Luleå HF of the SHL.
