= List of compositions by Erkki Melartin =

This is a comprehensive list of compositions by Erkki Melartin.

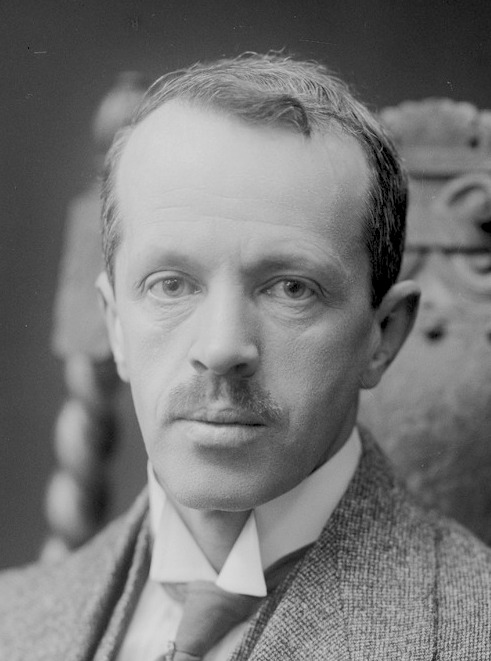
Erkki Melartin (c. 1910s)

The works have been listed systematically. Within each group there are first works with opus number and then the works with an EM code. All the works with opus number have been published, if not specified otherwise. Most of the works with code EM are unpublished, and only the publishing information has been given. All information is based on the newest work catalog (December 2016). The work catalog is based on the archival material and manuscripts in several Finnish libraries and music archives (The National Library, The Library of Sibelius Academy, The library and archive of Sibelius Museum in Turku, the music library of The Finnish Broadcasting Company etc.). In addition, all the relevant printed music publications have been used during the compiling work.

Rough translations in English have been provided for the opus titles, but not for the original literal works, unless in Finnish only.

== Operas ==
- Aino (opera), Op. 50 (1907-1908) - Libretto Jalmari Finne - Kalevala-mysterio kahdessa näytöksessä epilogineen solisteille, orkesterille and kanteleelle - A Kalevala mystery in two acts with an epilogue for soloists, orchestra and kantele
  - Ainon aaria koivulle - Ainos aria till björken (Joel Rundt) - Ainos Arie an die Birke (Friedrich Ege) – Published for voice and piano

== Other dramatic works ==
- Prinsessa Ruusunen, Op. 22 (1904) - Prinsessan Törnosa - Prinzessin Dornröschen – Music to a musical fairy tale by (Zachris Topelius, in Finnish by Aatto Suppanen in 5 acts for soloists, choir and orchestra. – Published partly as arrangements for voice and piano and for solo piano. Two unpublished suites exist.
  - 1. Alkusoitto - Förspel - Vorspiel (piano arrangement published)
  - 2. Paimentanssi - Herdedans - Hirtentanz (piano arrangement published)
  - 12. Merimiesten laulu - Sjömanvisa - Der Seemann singt (arrangement for voice and piano published)
  - 13. Puutarhurin laulu - Trädgårdsmästarens visa - Der Gärtner singt (arrangement for voice and piano published)
  - 14. Kalastajien laulu - Der Fischer singt - Fiskarens sång (arrangement for voice and piano published)
  - 15. Tonttutanssi - Tomtedans - Gnomentanz (piano arrangement published)
  - 16. Menuetto - Menuet - Menuett (piano arrangement published)
  - 17. Perhosvalssi - Perhoisvalssi - Fjärilsvals - Schmetterlingswalzer - Butterfly waltz (piano arrangement published)
  - 18. Kuutamobaletti - Månskensbalett - Mondschein Ballet (piano arrangement published)
  - 19. Valssi - Vals - Valse (piano arrangement published)
  - 21. Kehruulaulu - Spinnvisa - Spinnerlied (piano arrangement published)
  - 22. Doriinan laulu - Dorinas sång - Dorine singt (arrangement for voice and piano published)
  - 30. Juhlamarssi - Festmarsch - Festival March - Häämarssi (arrangements for piano, salon orchestra, brass band and organ published)
- Hiiden miekka (Goblin's Sword), Op. 39 (1906) – Music to a play by Eino Leino. – Only partially published for voice and piano and for solo piano.
- Salome, Op. 41 (1905) – Music for choir and orchestra to a play by Oscar Wilde, in Finnish by Jussi Snellman, mostly unpublished.
  - Salomes dans - Salomen tanssi - Salome tantzt – published 1906 as piano arrangement
- Ikuinen taistelu (Eternal struggle), Op. 63 (1905-1910) – A mystery for soloists, reciter, choir and orchestra to a play by Johannes Linnankoski, unpublished)
- Totuuden helmi (The Pearl of Truth), Op. 88 (1915) – Music for a fairy tale play by Zachris Topelius in Finnish by Ester Ståhlberg (the prologue), Tyko Hagman, Valter Juva and Viljo Tarkiainen for soloists, choir and chamber orchestra – Published arranged for voice and piano and solo piano.
- Tähtisilmä (Starry Eyed), Op. 124 (1924) – Music to a fairy tale play by Arvid Lydecken in three acts for soloists, choir and orchestra, mostly unpublished - Stjärnöga
  - Laulan laulun linnullein – part 25 arranged for voice and piano and published
- Pan, Op. 161 (1929-1930) – Unpublished and unfinished music for a German film.
- Pohjolan häät (The Wedding in Pohjola), Op. 179 (1902) – Unpublished music to a play by J. H. Erkko for soloists, chouir, string quartet, harp, kantele and brass.
- Balkanin kuningatar (The Queen of the Balkans), EM021 (1903) - Music to a play by Nikola I, Petrovitš Njegoš, unfinished sketches.
- Halleluja, EM059 (1901) – Music to a play by Bjørnstjerne Bjørnson for mixed choir and organ.
- Hannele, EM060 (1897-1901) - Music to a play by Gerhart Hauptmann, in Finnish by Jalmari Finne to mixed choir, piano, harmonium, organ and orchestra.
- Henrik IV (Henry IV), EM064 (1907) - Music to a play by William Shakespeare, in Finnish by Paavo Cajander for soloists and orchestra.
- Kevätaamun unelma (Un sogno d'una mattina primavera), EM110 (1905) – Music to a play by Gabriele D'Annunzio, in Finnish by Jalmari Hahl for orchestra.
- Valkoinen lootus (The White Lotus Flower), EM140 (1926) – Music to a play by Laura Soinne for soloists and an instrumental group.
- Meiram, EM156 (1897-1901) – Music to a play by Eino Leino for soloist and orchestra.
- Orlanda kuningatar (Queen Orlanda), EM177 (1906) – Music to a play by Catulle Mendès in Finnish by Jalmari Hahl for female choir and chamber orchestra.
- Simo Hurtta, EM213 (1908) – Music to play by Eino Leino for a soloist and kantele.
- Sisar Beatrice (Soeur Beatrice), EM214 (1903) – Music to a play by Maurice Maeterlinck in Finnish by Jalmari Finne for orchestra.
- Syöjättären satu (Fairy tale by a Harpy), EM228 (1925) – Music to a play by Aura Jurva for orchester – only fragments exist.
- Ikuinen läheisyys (Eternal Nearness), EM376 (1929?) – A play for radio, lost.
- Kandaules, EM404 (1916) – Music to a play by Jalmari Hahl, in Swedish by Bertel Gripenberg for choir and chamber orchestra. Part 1 (Andante) has been published as a piano arrangement and titled Preludi in 1925 (Suomen Musiikkilehti).
- Lucrezia Borgia, EM440A (1907) – Music to a play by Victor Hugo, in Finnish by Juhani Aho for soloists and orchestra.

== Ballets ==
- Sininen helmi (The Blue Pearl), Op. 160 (1928-1930) – A ballet in three acts (40 parts) to the libretto by Erkki Melartin and Kaarlo Eronen for orchestra. Several unpublished suites are known, the only one published and recorded is from 2015 and by Jani Kyllönen and Hannu Lintu.
  - Barcarolle - Venelaulu – Published in arrangement for two voices and piano in 1952, in Swedish by Joel Rundt

== Solo songs ==
For one voice and piano, if not specified otherwise.

- Två sånger (Two songs), Op. 3
  1. Marias vaggsång, Op. 3, No. 1 (1897) Oscar Levertin - Marian kehtolaulu (anonymous translation) – Arrangement for piano by Leo Funtek published 1926.
  2. Morgonsång, Op. 3, No. 2 (1898) The Bible. Canticles - Aamulaulu (teksti Korkeasta veisusta) - Arrangement for piano by Erkki Melartin published 1926.
- Nuorten lauluja I (Songs for the Youth I), Op. 4 (1897) - Eino Leino - De ungas sånger I
  1. Minä metsän polkuja kuljen (Along the paths in woodlands), Op. 4, No. 1 – Jag går längs skogens stigar
  2. Indiaani (Indian), Op. 4, No. 2 - Indianen
  3. Mirjamin laulu I (Mirjam's song), Op. 4, No. 3 - Mirjams sång I
  4. Mirjamin laulu II, Op. 4, No. 4 - Mirjams sång II
- Tre sanger (Three songs), Op. 13 (1898)
  1. O Herre Vilhelm Krag - Oi Herra (Ilta Koskimies) - O Vater, ich bin lebensmüd (anonymous) - O Father, give me (Anna Krook)
  2. Vandet risler... (Johannes Jørgensen)
  3. Avsked after Heinrich Heine in Swedish probably by Erkki Melartin
- Fyra sånger med piano (Four sångs with piano), Op. 14
  1. Flickans klagan, Op. 14, No. 1 (1901) Johan Ludvig Runeberg - Die Klage eines Mädchens (Woldemar Kolpytschew)
  2. Skymning, Op. 14, No. 2 (1901) Alceste (Nino Runeberg)
  3. Vintermorgon, Op. 14, No. 3 (1901) Arvid Mörne
  4. Kväll på kyrkogården, Op. 14, No. 4 (1903 or earlier) Ignotus - Abend auf dem Kichhof (F. Tilgmann)
- Nuorten lauluja II (Songs for the Youth II), Op. 15 - De ungas sånger - Der Jugend Lieder
  1. Itkisit (A Tear) (1900) Larin-Kyösti - En tår (anonymous)
  2. Sirkan häämatka (Grasshopper's wedding) (1898) Eino Leino - Sländans bröllop (anonymous)
  3. Pellavan kitkijä (Weeding the flax) (1897) Otto Manninen - Linbråkerskan (anonymous)
- Kolme laulua (Three songs), Op. 17
  1. Omenankukat (Apple blossoms) (1902 or earlier) Eino Leino - Apelblom (Nino Runeberg)
  2. Pohjatuulen tuomiset (In winter storm) (1896) J. H. Erkko - I vinterstorm (Nino Runeberg)
  3. Nuku hetkinen (Sleep a while) (1897) Eino Leino - Sov ett ögonblick, tärna du unga (Nino Runeberg)
- Indisches Lied, Op. 19, No. 1 (1899) Percy Bysshe Shelley, anonymous translator - Indisk sång (anonymous)
- La lune blanche, Op. 19, No. 2 (1906 or earlier) Paul Verlaine - Lied von Paul Verlaine (Hans Kirchner) - Sång af Paul Verlaine (anonymous)
- Rannalle nukkunut (Asleep onshore), Op. 19, No. 3 (1903 or earlier) Eino Leino - Han slumrade på stranden (anonymous)
- Kevätlaineet (Waves of spring), Op. 20, No. 1 (1902) Larin-Kyösti
- Päin kaunista kaukorantaa (Against the tempting opposite shote), Op. 20, No. 2 (1906 or earlier) Otto Manninen - Mot lockande fjärran stranden (Nino Runeberg)
- Sydänmaan lammella (On a backwoods pond), Op. 20, No. 3 (1897) Ilmari Kianto as Ilmari Calamnius – Arrangement for piano published 1920, for pump organ by Oskar Merikanto in 1924.
- Nya sånger (New songs), Op. 21 - Uusia lauluja
  1. Längtan heter min arvedel (1903) Erik Aksel Karlfelt
  2. I skäraste morgongryning (1895) Karl August Tavaststjerna
  3. Pohjan neidon ylistys (Praise of the Maiden of Pohjola) (1902) J. H. Erkko
- Ritorno, Op. 24, No. 1 (1905) Annie Vivanti - Paluu (anonymous) - Hemkomst (Nino Runeberg)
- Recordare, Op. 24, No. 2 (1906) liturgical text - Rukous (Jussi Snellman) - Bön (Nino Runeberg)
- Serenatella napolitana, Op. 24, No. 3 (1906 or earlier) traditional Italian song
- Maggiolata, Op. 24, No. 4 (1906 or earlier) Giosuè Carducci - Kevätlaulu (anonymous)
- Jeg beder er, Op. 26, No. 1 (1906) Herman Bang - Ich bitte euch (Woldemar Kolpytschew)
- Höst, Op. 26, No. 2 (1906 or earlier) Ignotus - Herbst (Woldemar Kolpytschew)
- Melodi, Op. 26, No. 3 (1906 or earlier) Anna Maria Roos - Melodie (Woldemar Kolpytschew)
- En visa till Karin när hon dansat, Op. 29, No. 1 (1897-1906) Gustaf Fröding - Ein Lied an Karin, als sie tanzte (Woldemar Kolpytschew)
- En visa till Karin ur fängelset, Op. 29, No. 2 (1906?) Gustaf Fröding
- Rosa romans bonitatem, Op. 32, No. 1 (1906) Birger Mörner - O, Madonna, beug' dich nieder (Waldemar Kolpytschew)
- Die heil'gen drei Könge, Op. 32, No. 2 (1906 or earlier) Heinrich Heine
- Onneni saari (My island of bliss), Op. 32, No. 3 (1914) Jussi Snellman - Min lyckoö (Joel Rundt)
- Lumpeenkukka (Water lily flower), Op. 37, No. 1 (1906) Heikki Rytkönen - Näckrosen (anonymous)
- Ikävyys (Dullness), Op. 37, No. 2 (1907) Aleksis Kivi
- Päivä koittaa, Op. 37, No. 3 (1907) A. Oksanen or August Ahlqvist - Dagen bräcker (Rafael Lindqvist)
- Illan varjot (Shadows of the night), Op. 37, No. 4 (1909 or earlier) Jussi Snellman
- Drick, Op. 38, No. 1 (1906) Bertel Gripenberg - Trink (Woldemar Kolpytschew)
- Den svarta fjäriln, Op. 38, No. 2 (1907) Oscar Levertin - Der schwarze Falter (Woldemar Kolpytschew)
- Vallarelåt, Op. 42, No. 1 (1906) Gustaf Fröding
- Christkindleins Wiegenlied, Op. 42, No. 2 (1906) Des Knaben Wunderhorn - Kristuslapsen kehtolaulu (Aune Krohn) – Kristusbarnets vaggsång (anonymous) - Kristbarnets vaggsång - A Christmas Cradle Song (Rosa Newmarch) – Arrangement for piano published 1925
- Vom Rosenquell, Op. 42, No. 3 (1906 or earlier) Hermann Ubell - Rosenundret (anonymous) - Ruusulähteellä (anonymous)
- Mutterfreude, Op. 42, No. 4 (1898) Sappho - Modersfröjd (anonymous) - Äidinilo (anonymous)
- Der Tod, das ist die kühle Nacht, Op. 42, No. 5 (1906) Heinrich Heine - On kuolo viileen kylmä yö (Jussi Snellman) - O död, du är den svala natt (anonymous)
- Klarer Himmel, Op. 42, No. 6 (1900?) original text Paul Verlaine, translation Carl Bulcke - Kirkas taivas (Jussi Snellman) - Klar himmel (anonymous)
- Am Tag freut uns die Sonne... , Op. 42, No. 7 (1907 or earlier) Otto Julius Bierbaum - Kun koittaa päivä kulta... (Jussi Snellman) - Skön är om dagen solen... (anonymous)
- Lauluja V. A. Koskenniemen runoihin I (Songs to the words by V. A. Koskenniemi), Op. 45 (1907-1920) Veikko Antero Koskenniemi, translations into German Johann Jakob Meyer – Leo Funtek has arranged the songs for voice and orchestra (unpublished)
  1. Syyslaulu (Autumn song), Op. 45, No. 1 (1909?) - Herbstlied
  2. Ma vierahassa kaupungissa käyn (I walk through a strange town), Op. 45, No. 2 (1912 or earlier) - Ich gehe eine fremde Stadt entlang
  3. Keskiyön kaupunki (The city at midnight), Op. 45, No. 3 (1913) - Die Stadt um Mitternacht
  4. Chrysanthemum, Op. 45, No. 4 (1913)
  5. Siell' on kauan jo kukkineet omenapuut (The apple trees already a long time in flower), Op. 45, No. 5 (1909) - Dort erblühte schon lange der Apfelbaum
  6. Kevätvaloa (Springtime light), Op. 45, No. 6 (1907-1911) - Frühlingslicht
  7. Yli vaikenevain kattoin (Over the silent roofs), Op. 45, No. 7 (1908) - Auf die Dächer
  8. Nää, oi mun sieluni, auringon korkea nousu! (Look, my soul, the sunrise), op45, No. 9 (1919) - Schau, meine Seele, der Sonne erhabenen Aufgang!
- Lauluja V. A. Koskenniemen runoihin II, (Songs to the words by V. A. Koskenniemi) Op. 46 (1907-1908) – Lakeus (The plains) - Die Ebene (Veikko Antero Koskenniemi, translations into German Johann Jakob Meyer – Leo Funtek has arranged the songs nos 2-8 for voice and orchestra (unpublished)
  1. Mun sieluni sun ylläs väräjää (My soul is quivering), Op. 46, No. 1 - Es zittert meine Seele über dir
  2. Sun rauhaas lemmin (I love your tranquility), Op. 46, No. 2 - Wie sonst nicht anderes lieb' ich deinen Frieden
  3. Yön ihmeelliseen valoon (Into the marvelous light of the night), Op. 46, No. 3 - Ins wunderbare Licht der Nacht
  4. Ikävässä kenttäin huojuvaisten (So tedious the spikes wobble), Op. 46, No. 4 - In der felder monotonem Schwanken
  5. Nyt öin jo yli kenttäin hämärtäy (Now the night is falling over the fields), Op. 46, No. 5 - Nun liegt die Flur auch Nachts im Dämmerlicht
  6. Päivän viime säteet (The last beams of the day), Op. 46, No. 6 - Letzter Sonnenstrahl
  7. Nocturne, Op. 46, No. 7 - Still die Vögel all auf ihren Zweigen
  8. Kesäyö kirkkomaalla (Summer night on a churchyard), Op. 46, No. 9 - Sommernacht auf einem Friedhof
- Lauluja V. A. Koskenniemen runoihin III (Songs to the words by V. A. Koskenniemi), Op. 47 (1907-1920) Veikko Antero Koskenniemi, translations into German Johann Jakob Meyer – Leo Funtek has arranged the songs for voice and orchestra (unpublished)
  1. Tule armaani and kätes anna mulle! (Come my love and stretch our your hand), Op. 47, No. 1 (1908) - Kom min kära, räck mig dina händer (Joel Rundt) - Komme Liebchen mein, und reiche mir die Hände!
  2. Katulyhty (Street lantern), Op. 47, No. 2 (1912?) - Die Strassenlaterne
  3. Syyssonetti (Autumnal sonnet), Op. 47, No. 3 (1919?) - Herbstsonett
  4. Kevätlaulu (Spring song), Op. 47, No. 4 (1918) - Lenzlied
  5. Pan, Op. 47, No. 5 (1920?) - O weh dem Wanderer im Waldesmoor
  6. Vanha Faun (Old Faun), Op. 47, No. 6 (1919) - Der alte Faun
  7. Nuori Psyyke (Young Psyche), Op. 47, No. 7 (1912?) - Die junge Psyche
  8. Fiat nox, Op. 47, No. 9 (1911) - So sinke Nacht
- Lastenlauluja I (Children's songs), Op. 49b (1907 or earlier) - Barnvisor I - Kinderlieder I
  1. Ratsulaulu (Knight song) (1906) Julius Krohn - Till mormor vi rida (anonymous)
  2. Das Maienglöckchen Adolf Schults - Kielon kellot (anonymous) - Konvaljen (Jussi Snellman)
  3. Der kleine Gernegross Traditional German text - Aimo aikamies (anonymous) - Store lillepytt (Jussi Snellman)
  4. Der Winter Matthias Claudius - Talvi (anonymous) - Vintern (Jussi Snellman)
  5. Frühlings Ankunft Des Knaben Wunderhorn - Kevätlaulu (anonymous) - Våren kommit (Jussi Snellman)
  6. Linnunpesä Georg Christian Dieffenbach, in Finnish by Jussi Snellman - Das Vogelnest - Fågelboet (Jussi Snellman)
- Kansanlauluja Käkisalmelta (Folk songs from Käkisalmi), Op. 55a (1908) - Volkslieder aus Kexholm - Arrangements for piano with the words. Opuses 55a-c were later published in one volume with the title 112 kansanlaulua Käkisalmelta. No attempt has been made to translate the original titles.
  1. Tule, tule! , 2. Pappani pellolla. 3. Yöllä, 4. Tytöt yksin, 5. Iso ilo, 6. Tallaralla, 7. Koivumetsässä, 8. Erotessa, 9. Kodista vieroitettu, 10. Voi, voi, voi, 11. Harmiaveden ranta, 12. Voi niitä aikoja, 13. Mene pois! , 14. Tytöt, 15. Illalla (Tula tullalla, posket pullalla), 16. Soutelin, soutelin, 17. Merellä, 18. Ähä, ähä!, 19. Kun etelästä tuulee, 20. Tän kylän ämmät, 21. Vienonlainen veto, 22. Hulivilipoika, 23. Vanha tanssi, 24. Lammin rannalla, 25. Kaurapellon pientarella, 26. Kuinka se joki taisi suora olla - Älven - Flusswindung (Elisabeth Kurkiala), 27. Surressa, 28. Hoilotus, 29. Joki, 30. Älä, tyttö, katsele, 31. Köyhä tyttö, 32. Niinkuin ne pienet lintuset, 33. Keskeltä Ostamo lainehtii, 34. Rimputa, ramputa, 35. Meinasin, meinasin, 36. Kaakkuri, 37. Turun linnan vanha kirkko, 38. Heilani (Joen takana on punanen talo) - Vännen min - Mein Liebchen (Elisabeth Kurkiala), 39. Mansikka on punanen marja, 40. Vuorolaulu (And tytöt meni niitylle sun saalialla niitylle).
- Piirilauluja Käkisalmelta (Circuit songs from Käkisalmi), Op. 55b (1908) - Volkslieder aus Kexholm II - No attempt has been made to translate the original titles.
  1. Se kunnia, 2. Lintu se lauloi, 3. Raita, 4. Sano, sano, 5. Kultani, 6. Sempä tähden, 7. Pappa se sanoi, 8. Tilu-lilu-lei, 9. Köyhä poika, 10. Yhdessä, 11. Onneni, 12. Vanha tanssi, 13. Heila Hampurissa, 14. Tule, tule, 15. Metsässä, 16. Nytpä nähdään, 17. Tään kylän tytöt, 18. Kylä, 19. Piirissä, 20. Lemmenkukkia, 21. Juu jaa and rallallei, 22. Naapurin likka, 23. Juomaripoika, 24. Minä sinua, sinä minua, 25. Rekilaulu (Musta lintu merikotka ylähällä lentää), 26. Kahvia, 27. Mamman sinisilmä, 28. Voi teitä, 29. Vankilaan mennessä, 30. Varis, 31. Ostamon järven rannalla, 32. Kesällä ei passaa, 33. Isäntä, emäntä, renki, 34. Tallella, 35. Kotimatkalla, 36. Tämä piiri, 37. Kesäillalla, 38. Laulu kullalle, 39. Älä unhoita minua, 40. Hohhoh-hohhoh.
- Kansanlauluja Käkisalmelta (Folk songs from Käkisalmi), Op. 55c (sovitettu 1908) - Volkslieder aus Kexholm III - No attempt has been made to translate the original titles.
  1. Hieno and hoikka, 2. Sillä lailla, tällä lailla, 3. Heilani kotiin, 4. Hyvä on laulella, 5. Varasleikki, 6. Hoilotus, 7. Jaakkarikello, 8. Ystäväni rakas, 9. Vierivän virran reunalla, 10. Salainen rakkaus, 11. Ei saa moittia, 12. Hyvää iltaa, 13. Iltalaulu (Voi kuin kauniin ruusun kukan eilen illalla löysin), 14. Kettu, 15. Sureva, 16. Pojat ne loikki, 17. Juomari, 18. Tanssi nyt!, 19. Väki tuli saaresta, 20. Viheriäisen niityn poikki, 21. Amalian aitta, 22. Sinun silmäs and minun silmät, 23. Kanon (Lemmen lämmöstä syttynyt on tuo mustikkainen suru), 24. Kananmuna, 25. Heilistä jäänyt, 26. Jos mie saisin, 27. Köyhistä vanhemmista, 28. Oman kylän poikien laulu, 29. Viheriäinen maa, 30. Rallati koputin, 31. Kulta, 32. Piiritanssi.
- Onnettomasti syntynyt, Op. 58, No. 1 (1909 or earlier) Kanteletar - Olycks barn (anonymous) - Das Unglückskind (Woldemar Kolpytschew) – Opus 58 bears a collective title Uusia lauluja vanhoihin sanoihin - Nya visor till gamla ord in some manuscripts, but all songs were published separately.
- An der Himmelstür, Op. 58, No. 2 (1909) Traditional text - Taivaan portilla (anonymous) - Vid himlaporten (anonymous)
- An Hesperos, Op. 58, No. 3 (1909) Bion of Smyrna, translation is anonymous
- Povertade, Op. 58, No. 4 (1909) Jacopone da Todi – Voice and piano or organ
- Hvem är du, o Tärna! , Op. 58, No. 5 (1909) Johan Olof Wallin
- L'automne, Op. 58, No. 6 (1909) Alphonse de Lamartine
- Cradle song, Op. 65 (1910) William Blake – Voice and string quartet
- Fem Sange (Five songs), Op. 69 (1910) - Fünf Lieder
  1. Kys mig på øjnene sol! Ludvig Holstein - Küss mir die Augen Sonne! (anonymous)
  2. Kys mig Thor Lange - Küss mich! (anonymous)
  3. Hvorfor? Thor Lange - Warum? (anonymous)
  4. Arkturus (Johannes Jørgensen) - Es blinket ein Sternlein einsam (anonymous)
  5. Tungsind O. Elholm - Schwermut (anonymous)
- Trois chansons avec piano (Three songs with piano), Op. 71 - Sånger
  1. Et s'il revenait un jour (1913) Maurice Maeterlinck - Om han återvände hem (Nino Runeberg)
  2. Angoisse (1915) Olly Donner - Ångest (Nino Runeberg) - Tuska (Meri Louhos)
  3. Chi sa... (1913) Annie Vivanti - Hvem vet? (anonymous)
- Gieb mir dein Herze, Op. 73, No. 1 (1910-1912?) Anonymous text of 1650 - Suo mulle syömmes, silloin syömmein sun ois Martti Korpilahti - Anna syömmes mulle (Wäinö Sola) - Giv mig ditt hjärta (Joel Rundt)
- Hyvää yötä (Good night), Op. 73, No. 2 (1912) L. Onerva, 1912) - Gute Nacht (Johannes Öhquist)
- Mot alla stjärnor, Op. 73, No. 3 (1912) Vilhelm Ekelund - Sternennacht (Johannes Öhquist)
- Kristallikukkia (Crystal flowers), Op. 73, No. 4 (Larin-Kyösti, 1912) - Kristallblumen (Johannes Öhquist)
- Lieder (Songs), Op. 77
  1. Traum (1908) Otto Julius Bierbaum
  2. Det är juni (1911) Vilhelm Ekelund - Es ist Juni (anonymous)
  3. Son gelosa di te (1904) Ada Negri - Eifersucht (anonymous)
- Från lägerbålet i öknen, Op. 78, No. 1 (1911) Verner von Heidenstam - Erämaan leiriltä (Jussi Snellman) - From desert camp fires (Angela Campbell McInnes) - Lien fragile (Gérard Jean-Aubry)
- Ro, Op. 78, No. 2 (1912 or earlier) Vilhelm Ekelund - Rauha (Jussi Snellman) - Peace (Angela Campbell McInnes) - Apaisement (Gérard Jean-Aubry)
- Från andra sidan Styx, Op. 78, No. 3 (1901) Karl August Tavaststjerna - Styx virralta (Jussi Snellman)
- Tre sange (Three songs), Op. 86 (1914)
  1. Aftensang (Erik Moltesen)
  2. Den forladte (Erik Moltesen)
  3. Under häggarna (Jarl Hemmer)
- Hjärtstilla, Op. 89a (1911) Erik Axel Karlfeldt - Yönkukka (Jussi Snellman)
- Solsang, Op. 89b (1918) Helge Rode - Solsång (anonymous) - Aurinkolaulu (Johannes Linnankoski)
- Fire Sange (Four songs), Op. 95 - Vier Lieder - Fyra sånger
  1. En melodi (1904) Valdemar Rørdam
  2. Der König im Kerker (1914) Richard Schaukal - Bass and piano
  3. Sister, awake! (1912?) Anonymous text of 1604 - Vakna min syster! (Anna Krook)
  4. Som på blånande fjärdar (1914-1916) Jarl Hemmer
- Sånger till ord af Jarl Hemmer, Op. 96 (1915-1916?) Jarl Hemmer
  1. Elegie
  2. Akvarell
  3. Vårmorgon - Kevätaamu (Pekka Sipilä)
- Fem nya sånger (Five new songs), Op. 97 (1916-1917) - Viisi uutta laulua (all translation into Finnish by Jussi Snellman)
  1. Den långa dagen Johan Ludvig Runeberg - Pitkä päivä
  2. Till Helmi Josef Julius Wecksell - Helmille
  3. Mademoiselle Rococo Mikael Lybeck - Mademoiselle Rokoko
  4. November (Poul Andersen) - Marraskuu
  5. Vem styrde hit din väg? (Johan Ludvig Runeberg) - Ken tiesi tänne toi?
- Kuutamo (Moonlight), Op. 99, No. 1 (1915) Otto Manninen - I månestrålars sken (Nino Runeberg)
- Kuu kalpea (The pale moon), Op. 99, No. 2 (1913-1916) Eino Leino - Den bleka månen (Rafael Lindqvist)
- Oi suljehan silmäsi (Oh, close your eyes), Op. 99, No. 3 (1899) Eino Leino - O slut dina ögon (anonymous)
- Oravan jäljillä (On the trail of a squirrel), Op. 99, No. 4 (1911 or earlier) Larin-Kyösti - I ekorrns spår (Nino Runeberg)
- Poluilla harmajilla (On the grey paths), Op. 99, No. 5 (1900?) Pontus Artti, unpublished
- Satakielelle (To the nightingale), Op. 99, No. 6 (1918?) Veikko Antero Koskenniemi - Till en näktergal (Rafael Lindqvist)
- Fyra Tagore-sånger (Four Tagore songs), Op. 105 (1914-1918) Rabindranath Tagore - Fyra sånger till text av Tagore – Voice, piano and violin ad. lib.
  1. Skyar (Nino Runeberg) - Wolken (Marie-Luise Gothein) - Clouds (Rabindranath Tagore)
  2. Sagan om vårt hjärta (anonymous) - Das Märchen uns'rer Liebe (Maria Beaurain) - Record of our hearts (Rabindranath Tagore)
  3. Smärtan (anonymous) - Der Schmerz (Maria Beaurain) - I plucked your flower (Rabindranath Tagore)
  4. Sinä päivänä (Helmi Krohn) - Allvarsdagen (Nino Runeberg) - Der ernste Tag (Maria Beaurain) - On the day (Rabindranath Tagore)
- Sånghälsning, Op. 106, No. 1 (1917) Georg Mellin - Soios soitto (Jussi Snellman) - Voice, piano and violin ad. lib.
- Wiegenlied bei Mondschein zu singen, Op. 106, No. 2 (1918) Matthias Claudius - Vaggvisa i månskenet (Nino Runeberg) - Voice, piano and violin ad. lib.
- Liedchen, Op. 106, No. 3 (1920) Oskar von Redwitz - En visa (Nino Runeberg) - Laulelma Amaranthista (Jussi Snellman)
- Hymn, Op. 106, No. 4 (1920) Selma Kajanus - Hymn till vänskapen - Ystävyyden ylistys (Jussi Snellman) - Voice, piano or harp
- Schlummerliedchen, Op. 106, No. 5 (1920) Emanuel von Bodman - Slummervisa (Rafael Lindqvist) - Sorsat ne rantojen kaisloissa uivat (anonymous)
- 6 Sange (Six songs), Op. 107 - Sex sånger
  1. Al denne sorte himmel (1897/1918) Vilhelm Krag - Fred (anonymous) – Mezzo-soprano and piano
  2. Den lyse Nat (1919) Hans Hartvig Seedorff
  3. Pääskyselle (To the swallow) (1910) Jooseppi Mustakallio - Til Svalen (Hans Hartvig Seedorff)
  4. Vinternat (1919) Peter Andreas Rosenberg
  5. Ak, du birketræ (1920) Thor Lange
  6. Intet kan dø (1919) Thorkil Barfod
- Det första regnet, Op. 109, No. 1 (1919 or earlier) Svea Hällström - Keväinen sade (Jussi Snellman)
- Solen sjunkit, Op. 109, No. 2 (1916) Jacob Tegengren - Päivä sammui (Jussi Snellman)
- Falder dig Vandringen tung, Op. 109, No. 3 (1919 or earlier) Gunnar Gunnarsson - Työläs kulkus jos tuo (Jussi Snellman)
- Det er i Dag et Vejr, Op. 109, No. 4 (1919 or earlier) Ludvig Holstein - On päivä kirkas (Jussi Snellman)
- Stimme im Dunkeln, Op. 109, No. 5 (1906) Richard Dehmel - Röster i dunklet (Rafael Lindqvist)
- Die heiligen drei Könige der Elenos, Op. 109, No. 6 (1899?) Otto Julius Bierbaum, unpublished
- Keinutan kaikua (Swaying the echo), Op. 115, No. 1 (1904) L. Onerva - Varligt jag vaggar dig (Joel Rundt)
- Toivoni (My hope), Op. 115, No. 2 (1904) Paavo Cajander
- Sie singt, Op. 115, No. 3 (1900) Emanuel von Bodman
- Du blühst wie die Julirosen, Op. 115, No. 4 (1907) Maximilian Danthendey - Du blommar som julirosen (Rafael Lindqvist) - unpublished
- Bergerette, Op. 115, No. 5 (1917) Elin Golovin - A mon aiglon - Till min örnunge - Den lilla härdinnan / Den lilla herdinnan (Rafael Lindqvist)
- Vandringer, Op. 116, No. 1 (1918) Laurits Christian Nielsen
- Sommersang, Op. 116, No. 2 (1919 or earlier) Erik Moltesen
- Liebeslied, Op. 116, No. 3 (1895 /1918) Ewhadaddin Enweri, translation to German by Anton Eduard Wollheim - Persische Lieder
- Spielmannslied, Op. 116, No. 4 (1919) Des Knaben Wunderhorn - Spelmansvisa (Nino Runeberg)
- Stum kärlek, Op. 116, No. 5 (1919) Johan Ludvig Runeberg - Stumme Liebe (Friedrich Hermann Schneider)
- Mitt hjärta behöver, Op. 116, No. 6 (1919) Jarl Hemmer - Mein Herze ersehnt sich (Friedrich Hermann Schneider)
- Sånger vid piano (Songs with piano), Op. 117 (1921) – all translations by Jussi Snellman
  1. I natt skall jag dö Harriet Löwenhjelm - Viimeinen yö
  2. Skåda, skåda hur det våras Harriet Löwenhjelm - Katso, kuinka kevään saamme
  3. Til et barn Herman Wildenwey - Lapselle
  4. Fågeln i päronträd Traditional Swedish text - Istut, lintunen oksallas
- Höstackord, Op. 122, No. 1 (1924) Prince Wilhelm, Duke of Södermanland, unpublished

Opus 122, No. 2 has been never used

- Luonnon yö, Op. 122, No. 3 (1923) J. H. Erkko, unpublished - Naturens natt (anonymous)
- So bin ich nur als Kind erwacht, Op. 122, No. 4 (1923-1924) Rainer Maria Rilke, unpublished

Opus 122, No. 5 has been never used

- Bön om ro, Op. 122, No. 6 (1924) Jarl Hemmer - Rauhan rukous (Ilta Koskimies)
- En liten visa, Op. 122, No. 7 (1928 or earlier) Jussi Snellman - En liten minnesvisa
- Jul, Op. 122, No. 9 (1927?) Jacob Tegengren - Hyvyyden voiman ihmeellisen suojaan (Anna-Maiand Raittila) – The melody has been used with at least five Swedish choral texts: Att bedand är ej endast att begära - Frälsare du som äger läkedomen - När du är trött - Se, kärlet brast, och oljan är utgjuten - Tänk när en gång det töcken har försvunnit.
- Kolme laulua (Three songs), Op. 128
  1. Tili tili tengan löysin (1928) A. O. Väisänen
  2. Sykön virsi (1925 or earlier) Eino Leino
  3. Merimiehen iltalaulu (1920?) Veikko Antero Koskenniemi
- Uusia kansanlauluja (New folk songs), Op. 130 (1925) Traditional texts, translations by Joel Rundt - Nya folkvisor - 7 uutta kansanlaulua - No attempt has been made to translate the original titles.
  1. Kaipaava - Den längtande
  2. Heilini soitteli (Talvella Talikkalan markkinoilla) - Minns du på marknadsdansen i staden
  3. Sinun silmäs and minun silmät - Dina ögon och mina ögon
  4. Aikoand entisiä - Gångna tider
  5. Vierivän virran reunalla - Vid den glidande flodens strand
  6. Linnassa - I fästningen
  7. Hyvästijättö - Farväl
- Nuorten laulukirja I (Song book of the youth I), Op. 131 (1925?) – Songs to one, two and three voices with piano (also a version with only one voice published 1929)
  1. Taas koulun ukset aukeaa (The school begins) (Immi Hellén)
  2. Lumisilla (Snowball fight) (anonymous)
  3. Meidän mummo (Our grandma) (Alli Nissinen)
  4. Lintujen syyslaulu (Autumn song of the birds) (Immi Hellén)
  5. Lauvantai-ilta (Saturday night) (traditional text)
  6. Isä pellollaan (Father on the field) (Immi Hellén)
  7. Kevät kutoo (Spring is coming) (anonymous)
  8. Keväällä (In the spring time) (pseudonym T.S.)
  9. Nukkien karkelot (The puppets are dancing) (Alli Nissinen) - Nukkien tanssit
  10. Mirrit koulussa (Kitties in school) (anonymous)
  11. Kesän tullessa (The summer is coming) (Yrjö Veijola)
  12. Leivo (Skylark) (Aleksanteri Rahkonen)
  13. Seimen lapsi (Child in the manger) (anonymous)
  14. Jouluaamu (Christmas morning) (Immi Hellén)
  15. Jouluilta salomailla (Christmas evening in the backwoods) (Arvily)
  16. Lapin tunturilla (Mountain of Lapland) (anonymous)
  17. Puurolaulu (Porridge song) (anonymous)
  18. Joulu armas muistuu mieleen (I still remember the sweet Christmas time) (pseudonym "-a -a")
  19. Kiitos (Thank you) (Simo Korpela) – Voice and organ or piano
  20. Työtä aljettaessa (When the work is beginning) (A. Oksanen)
  21. Kiitosvirsi (Hymn of thank) (Simo Korpela)
  22. Hiljaisuutta anna (Give me some silence) (pseudonym L.S.)
  23. Helluntaivirsi (Johan Ludvig Runeberg in Finnish by Alpo Noponen)
  24. Totuuden henki (Spirit of the truth) (Zachris Topelius in Finnish by V. Vesala) - Totuuden henki, haasta korkealta (Alpo Noponen, 1927)
- Paddan, Op. 132 (1926) Johan Henric Kellgren - Sammakko (Kyllikki Solanterä)
- Nuorten laulukirja II (Song book of the youth II), Op. 134a (1927 or earlier) – Songs to one, two and three voices with piano (also a version with only one voice published 1929)
  1. Hyvä paimen (The good shepherd) (Immi Hellén)
  2. Linnun hautaus (Bird's burial) (Alpo Noponen)
  3. Rattoisa retki (A merry moment) (Immi Hellén)
  4. Suvinen sade (Rain in summer) (Alpo Noponen)
  5. Tuuti (Sleep) (Alli Nissinen)
  6. Virsi kotimaan puolesta (Hymn for our homeland) (Suonio)
  7. Kodin kynnys (Doorstep at home) (Arvily)
  8. Kyläkoulu (Village school) (Arvily)
  9. Autan ensin (I help in the first place) (Arvily)
  10. Heikin ystävät (Friends of Heikki) (Arvily)
  11. Iltalaulu (Evening song) (Arvily)
  12. Ratsu reipas odottaa (A brisk steed is waiting) (Arvily)
  13. Suvella (In the summer time) (Jussi Snellman)
  14. Pikku Maiand nurmikolla (Little Maiand on the lawn) (Immi Hellén)
  15. Unten siipisisko (Gentle sister of sleep) (Arvily)
  16. Mirriäidin lapset (Puppies of the mother cat) (Immi Hellén)
  17. Karhujen tanssi (Dance of the bears) (pseudonym "-n")
  18. Niityllä (On the fields) (Ilmari Kianto)
  19. Lasten joululaulu (Children sing for Christmas) (Larin-Kyösti)
  20. Lumisateella (It's snowing) (Suonio)
  21. Rukous (A pray) (Alli Nissinen)
  22. Talvi-iltahämärässä (Twilight of the winter evening) (Larin-Kyösti)
  23. Oi kuin selvään soipi meille (So clearly it chimes) (Immi Hellén)
  24. Te soikaa joulun kellot taas (Toll you bells of Christmas) (Aukusti Simelius)
- Nuorten laulukirja III (Song book of the youth III), Op. 134b (1928 or earlier) – Songs to one, two and three voices with piano (also a version with only one voice published 1928)
  1. Luistimilla (Skating) (Otto Manninen)
  2. Kultasauva (Golden rod) (Otto Manninen)
  3. Toivoni (My hope) (Paavo Cajander)
  4. Mökkiläinen and hänen poikansa (Cottager and his son) (Eino Leino)
  5. Suvisia suruja (Summery sorrows) (Larin-Kyösti)
  6. Enkelten joululaulu paimenille (Angels singing to the shepherds) (Ilmari Pimiä)
  7. Joulun kellot (Bells of Christmas) (Ilmari Pimiä)
  8. Lapin joulu (Christmas in Lapland) (Larin-Kyösti)
  9. Orpo (Orphan) (Hiland Haahti)
  10. Kotia kohti (Going home) (Hiland Haahti)
  11. Muista kotiasi (Remember your home) (pseudonym Tyyne R.)
  12. Ensi lumi (The first snow) (Einari Vuorela)
  13. Uudelle vuodelle (To the New Year) (Arvily)
  14. Kaksoset (Twins) (Arvily)
  15. Köyhän antimet (Gifts of a pauper) (Arvily)
  16. Kehtolaulu (Nyt on aika pienen miehen unten maille kiiruhtaa) (Lullaby) (Arvily)
  17. Koulumatkalla (On the school trip) (Alli Nissinen)
  18. Tunnetko meidän pullean pojan (Do you know our chubby boy) (Annikki Setälä)
  19. Äiti and Nanu (Mother and Nanu) (Annikki Setälä)
  20. Äidin apulainen (Mother's little helper) (Annikki Setälä)
  21. Kahvikemut (Coffee party) (Salme Setälä)
  22. Tuhma Jukka (Naughty Jukka) (Salme Setälä)
  23. Yölaulu (Night song) (pseudonym Cartouche)
  24. Unten mailla (Asleep) (pseudonym Pojukissa)
- Nuorten laulukirja IV (Song book of the youth IV), Op. 134c (1929 or earlier) – Songs to one, two and three voices with piano (also a version with only one voice published 1929)
  1. Suomen nimi (Name of Finland) (Zachris Topelius)
  2. Korven kansan toivo (Hope of the poor people) (Alli Nissinen)
  3. Pyyntö (A plea) (Yrjö Teppo)
  4. Valkeille kirsikan kukille (To the white cherry blossoms) (Zachris Topelius)
  5. Sinivuokko (Liverwort) (Lempi Vihervaara)
  6. Kissankellolle (To the bluebell) (pseudonym Sirja-sisko)
  7. Orava (Squirrel) (pseudonym Pikku prinsessa)
  8. Narri-kissa (A cat named Narri) (Immi Hellén)
  9. Vappuratsastus (Riding of First of May) (Zachris Topelius)
  10. Iltahetki (Evening) (pseudonym Saarentyttö)
  11. Lapsikullat nukkukaa (Sleep my dear babies) (pseudonym "-a")
  12. Tuutulaulu (Tuutu mun lastani tupukkaa) (Lullaby) (Annikki Setälä)
  13. Afrikassa, keidasmaassa (In Africa, the land of oases) (Arvily)
  14. Syyskuu (September) (Lempi Paala)
  15. Onnellinen (Happy) (pseudonym Liekki)
  16. Mummon haudalla (On grandmas's grave) (pseudonym Inkeri)
  17. Maailma on suur (Wide is the world) (Zachris Topelius)
  18. Helvinpäivät (Name day of Helvi) (Salme Setälä)
  19. Kevään henki (Spirit of spring) (Zachris Topelius)
  20. Kevätleikki (Spring fun) (anonymous)
  21. Tule, joulu! (Oh come, Christmas!) (Lempi Vihervaara)
  22. Joulupäivä (Christmas Day) (pseudonym Tyyne R.)
  23. Jeesus siunaa lapsia (Jesus, bless the children) (Immi Hellén)
  24. Siunaus (Blessing) (Zachris Topelius)
- Den sista stjärnan, Op. 136, No. 1 (1930) Bo Bergman, unpublished
- Jorden är blott du och jag och mull, Op. 136, No. 2 (1927) Pär Lagerkvist, unpublished
- Springvandet, Op. 136, No. 3 (end of the 1920s) Helge Rode, unpublished
- Den døde tid, Op. 136, No. 4 (1927) Johannes Jørgensen, unpublished
- Lintunen (Little bird), Op. 138, No. 1 (1925-1925) Josef Julius Wecksell, in Finnish by Otto Manninen, unpublished
- Leivo, Op. 138, No. 2 (Aleksanteri Rahkonen) - Lärkan (Joel Rundt) – Skylark (Alex Bryan) – Several arrangements: kantele by Eero Koskimies, guitar by Viljo Immonen, female choir by Eino Linnala, Violoncello by Vili Pullinen and instrumental group by Lauri Sarlin.
- Vappuratsastus (Riding of First of May), Op. 138, No. 3 (1925-1926) Zachris Topelius, unpublished
- Pustan poika, (Son of Hungarian steppes) Op. 138, No. 4 (1925-1926?) Sándor Petőfi, in Finnish by Otto Manninen, unpublished
- Koti kultaisin (Home sweet home), Op. 138, No. 5 (1925-1926?) Otto Manninen, unpublished
- Kehtolaulu joka vuodenajalle (Lullaby for each season), Op. 138, No. 6 (1925-1926?) Lempi Vihervaara, unpublished
- Talven tulo, (Winter is coming) Op. 138, No. 7 (1925-1926?) Aarne Kumpuniemi, unpublished
- Kevätlaulu (Spring song), Op. 138, No. 9 (1925-1926?) pseudonym T. S., unpublished
- Kolme syyslaulua (Three autumn songs), Op. 139 (1927-1928) - Tre höstsånger
  1. Sa lohdun, Herra (You give the comfort, Lord) Eemil Hiille - Du skänker tröst (Joel Rundt)
  2. Punakylkiset omenat (Red faces apples) Eeva Satakunta - De röda äpplena falla (Joel Rundt)
  3. Syystuuli soittaa (Autumn winds are playing) J. K. Kulomaa - Höstvinden spelar (Joel Rundt)
- Paimenelta (From a shepherd), Op. 140, No. 1 (1894) J. H. Erkko - Pastorale
- Schliesse mir die Augen beide, Op. 140, No. 2 (1927?) Theodor Storm - Lad mit trøtte øje lukkes (anonymous)
- Lasten maailmasta, Op. 141 (1927) - 10 pientä laulelmaa - Nuotinnoksessa ei ole erillistä melodiaääntä, laulut voi soittaa myös pianokappaleina.
  1. Alkaessa (Beginning) (Immi Hellén)
  2. Metsäpirtin lasten laulu (Song of the children in a cottage) (Aini Setälä)
  3. Mikin kengät (Mikki's shoes) (Salme Setälä)
  4. Hiekassa (Covered with sand) (Annikki Setälä)
  5. Nöpön tiput (Nöpö's chicken) (Annikki Setälä)
  6. Takkavalkean ääressä (By the fire) (Annikki Setälä)
  7. Säteet (Streams) (Annikki Setälä)
  8. Porolla ajo (Riding a reindeer) (Annikki Setälä)
  9. Poroparvi (Flock of reindeers) Annikki Setälä)
  10. Päivää, pukki (Good day, Santa Claus) (Immi Hellén)
- Nuorten laulukirja V (Song book of the youth V), Op. 146 (1927) – Songs to one, two and three voices with piano
  1. Jumalan kartano (God's seat) (Elina Vaara)
  2. Purjehdusretki (Sailing trip) (Elina Vaara)
  3. Uudelle vuodelle (The new year) (Arvily)
  4. Hiihtolaulu (Skiing song) (Arvily)
  5. Kalle and Ville (Kalle and Ville) (Arvily)
  6. Kinosten suojassa (Sheltered by the drifts) (Arvily)
  7. Kai and varjo (Kai and a shadow) (Arvily)
  8. Unikeko (Sleepyhead) (Arvily)
  9. Ilmapallot (Balloons) (Salme Setälä)
  10. Keinuhevonen (Rocking horse) (Salme Setälä)
  11. Joulupukki (Santa Claus) (Salme Setälä)
  12. Kahvikemut (Coffee party) (Salme Setälä)
  13. Pesen poikaa palleroista (Washing my plump son) (Annikki Setälä)
  14. Kissanpojat (Kittens) (Annikki Setälä)
  15. Muuttolinnut (Birds of passage) (pseudonym Pohjatuuli)
  16. Kultakalat (Goldfishes) (Anna Kaari)
  17. Rannalla (On the shore) (Anna Kaari)
  18. Lumisade (Snowing) ('Märchen Elisabeth)
  19. Taikalähde (Magical source) (pseudonym Leporello)
  20. Kissankellolle (To a bluebell) (pseudonym Sirpa-sisko)
  21. Unten mailla (Asleep) (pseudonym Pojukissa)
  22. Linnunpojat (Nestlings) (pseudonym Liekki)
  23. Jouluna (At Christmas time) (pseudonym Ruskolilja)
  24. Joulukellot (Christmas bells) (pseudonym Punapeippo)
- Suomalaisia kansanlauluja (Finnish folk songs), Op. 148 (1928 or earlier) - Finska Folkvisor - Finnische Volkslieder - 7 uutta kansanlaulua – Finnish folk songs, translations by Nino Runeberg - No attempt has been made to translate the original titles.
  1. Tule surma - Kom nu, död
  2. Ieva (recorded as Laiska Jaakko)
  3. Silloin minä itkin - Bittra tårar – Arrangement for 2 violins, Violoncello and double bass by Lauri Sarlin published
  4. Odottava - Den väntande
  5. Heilani kotiin - Piiritanssi - Till kärestans stuga - Ringdans
  6. Salainen suru - Hemlig sorg
  7. Tanssilaulu (Ähä, ähä, ämmäparat) - Dansvisa (Oh-oh, oh-oh, stackars gummor) – Arrangement for female chorus published
- Neljä laulua (Four songs), Op. 151 (1928) - Fyra sånger
  1. Kotihinsa muut menevät (Kalevala) - Till ett hem får andra styra (Joel Rundt)
  2. Maria, Guds moder (Ragnar Ekelund) - Sa Maaria, Neitsyt (Ilta Koskimies)
  3. Stjärnor (Carl Jonas Love Almqvist) - Tähdet (Jussi Snellman)
  4. Isä meidän (Our father) (Jussi Snellman) - Fader vår (Joel Rundt)
- Kahdeksantoista karjalaista kansanlaulua (18 Carelian folk songs), Op. 156 (1921?) - 18 kansanlaulua Käkisalmelta - Kahdeksantoista Karjalaista kansanlaulua – Folk songs, translations by Nino Runeberg - No attempt has been made to translate the original titles.
  1. Pilvet ne varjosti - Sky vid sky
  2. Pellolla - Mitt på min pappas fält
  3. Köyhä poika - Klandra inte en fattig gosse
  4. Etelästä tuulee - När det blåser sunnanvind
  5. Joki - Älvens böljor - Flusswindung
  6. Hyvästijättö - Avskedssång
  7. Meinasin - Tänkte och tänkte att söka mig brud
  8. Pilalaulu (Mansikka on punainen marja)' - Smultronbäret
  9. Mun heilani - Vännen min
  10. Koivumetsä - I björkskogen
  11. Vankilaulu - En fånges visa
  12. Vankilaan mennessä - På väg till fängelset
  13. Yhdessä - Tillsammans
  14. Tulatulla - Om kvällen
  15. Lammen rannalla - Minns du?
  16. Rallati koputin - Hei tralla och dalla-la!
  17. Naapurin likka - Grannens flicka
  18. Hulivilipoika - En slarvens visa
- Fem sånger till ord av Jarl Hemmer, Op. 162 (1930) Jarl Hemmer
  1. Vi som ännu leva
  2. Jag vill allting glömma
  3. Bön om ett nytt hjärta
  4. Sälg i sol – Paju auringossa (Erkki Ainamo)
  5. Tjugo år - Kaksikymmenvuotias (Erkki Ainamo)

Opuses 164 and 165 are all Finnish folk song arrangements - No attempt has been made to translate the original titles.

- Maailmalle matkani, Op. 164, No. 1 (1936 or earlier) – published 1958 in Viisi kansanlaulua
- Lahden laineilla, Op. 164, No. 2 (1936 or earlier) – published 1958 in Viisi kansanlaulua
- Älä mene heilani, Op. 164, No. 3 (1936 or earlier) – published 1958 in Viisi kansanlaulua
- Passaahan sitä, Op. 164, No. 4 (1936 or earlier) – published 1958 in Viisi kansanlaulua
- Se kunnia!, Op. 164, No. 5 (1936 or earlier) – published 1958 in Viisi kansanlaulua
- Hyvää iltaa, Op. 164, No. 6 (1930s) – Goder afton (Ture Ara) – published 1944 in Kaksi karjalaista kansanlaulua
- Mamman sinisilmä, Op. 165, No. 1 (1930s) unpublished - Var är mammas lilla flicka
- Vaikein hetki, Op. 165, No. 2 (1930s) – Den ensamme stunden (Ture Ara) – published 1944 in Kaksi karjalaista kansanlaulua - Vesper' premanta (possibly Vilho Setälä)
- Raitilla, Op. 165, No. 3 (1930s), unpublished
- Jos minä tietäisin kultani mielen. Op. 165, No. 4 (1930s), unpublished
- Kodista vieroitettu, Op. 165, No. 5 (1930s) unpublished
- Senpä tähden, Op. 165, No. 6 (1930s), unpublished
- Iltalaulu, Op. 165, No. 7 (1930s), unpublished
- Bröllopssång, Op. 166 (1930) Erkki Melartin - Häälaulu (Oi onni suuri) (Ilta Koskimies)
- Gondoolilaulu (Gondola song), Op. 167 (1930) Elina Vaara, unpublished)
- Te soikaa joulun kellot taas (Ring them Christmas bells again), Op. 169, No. 1 (1926) Aukusti Simelius – Voice and piano or harmonium - Kolme joululaulua (Three Christmas songs)
- Sa juhla talven keskellä, Op. 169, No. 2 (1926) Irene Mendelin - Voice and piano or harmonium
- Joulupäivä (Christmas day), Op. 169, No. 3 (1926) pseudonym Tyyne P. - Jouluna - Voice and piano or harmonium
- Tröst, Op. 170, No. 1 (1931) Johan Ludvig Runeberg - Lohdutus (Erkki Melartin) - Consolation (Edward Adams-Ray)
- Höstkvällen, Op. 170, No. 2 (1931) Johan Ludvig Runeberg - Kuin kalpeaa on kaikki (Pekka Sipilä) - Autumn eve (Edward Adams-Ray)
- Törnet, Op. 170, No. 3 (1931) Johan Ludvig Runeberg - Villiruusu (Erkki Melartin?) - The Briar (Edward Adams-Ray)
- Så jag färdas sjelf mot fjärran, Op. 171, No. 1 (1931) Johan Ludvig Runeberg - Miksi puron laine huokaa (anonymous)
- Hvarje årstid, Op. 171, ro 2 (1931) Johan Ludvig Runeberg, unpublished - Miksi puron laine huokaa (anonymous)
- Dagar komma, Op. 172, No. 1 (1931) Johan Ludvig Runeberg, unpublished - Päivä koittaa (Ture Ara)
- Mellan friska blomster, Op. 172, No. 2 (1931) Johan Ludvig Runeberg, unpublished - Loisteessa kukkain (Pekka Sipilä)
- Fågeln, Op. 172, No. 3 (1931) Johan Ludvig Runeberg, unpublished - Lintu (Ture Ara)
- Lapsille (To the children), Op. 173 (1930s, unpublished, lost) - 10 pientä laulua
- Lauluja Käkisalmelta (Songs from Käkisalmi), Op. 176 (1930s), unpublished, lost
- Aate (Idea), EM003 (1928?) Irene Mendelin - Voice
- Abendsegen, EM005 (1910-luku) anonymous text from 1680
- Ahdistuksessa (Anguish), EM006 (1932) Vilho Rantanen
- Aino neiti (Maiden Aino), EM007 (1911 or earlier) Eino Leino, published 1911 - Voice
- Ballaadi (Ballad), EM022 (1902) Santeri Ingman
- En blomma, EM027 (1902 or 1935) Viktor Rydberg
- Blomster i snee, EM028 (1895) Thor Lange, lost
- Crescendo, EM033 (1932) Uuno Kailas
- Det är en ros utsprungen, EM034 (1923, published 1925) traditional German text - Gammal julpsalm - Voice and organ or piano
- D'une prison, EM038 (?) Paul Verlaine
- Elannon laulu II (Song for Elanto), EM039 (1930, published 1933) Yrjö Jylhä – Voice (also for mixed choir)
- Es war zu unser Lenzeszeit, EM040 (1896) anonymous text - Piano and text
- For alle gode tanker, EM049 (1915) Jens Peter Jacobsen – Piano and text
- Fragment af en kärleksdröm, EM050 (1895) Karl August Tavaststjerna - 6 Sånger ur K. A. Tawaststjernas Fragment af en kärleksdröm
  1. Vi möttes, vi stannade, bytte en blick
  2. Vid min bok jag satt och drömde
  3. Jag söker att binda tillsamman
  4. Nu vill jag glömma att du bröt
  5. Och när du vaggat mitt hjärta
  6. Du var mig mera nära
- Förbi, EM053 (1911 Vilhelm Ekelund
- Den förrådda kärleken, EM055 (1931) Johan Ludvig Runeberg
- Een gammal Boord-Wijsa, EM056 (1898-1914, published 1918, 1976 and 2000) traditional Swedish text - Wanha kestilaulu (Jussi Snellman) - Voice and piano or lute
- Goternas sång, EM057 (1894) Viktor Rydberg
- Helmikuun ilta, EM062 (1911 or earlier, published 1911) Ilmari Kianto - Voice
- Henki, EM063 (1911 or earlier, published 1911) J. H. Erkko - Voice
- Herra Petteri, EM066 (1921?) traditional text
- Hosiannah, EM068 (1893) Gustaf Fröding
- Hur jag älskar dig, EM069 (1894) anonymous text
- I båten hade vi sabbat, EM072 (1895) Karl August Tavaststjerna
- Illan tullen (In the evening), EM074 (1913?) anonymous text
- Ilta hautausmaalla (Night in the graveyard), EM075 (1890-luku?, lost) anonymous text
- Iltarukous (Night prayer), EM077 (1907) Julius Krohn - Voice and piano or harmonium
- Im grünenden Wiesengrunde, EM078 (1894) anonymous text
- Im Walde, EM079 (tekstin tekijää ei tiedetä, 1911?, kadoksissa)
- Immelle (To a maid), EM080 (1893) Rietrikki Polén
- Ja! Kunde jeg se dig smile, EM087 (1934) Viggo Christiansen
- Jos olet mun! (If you'll be mine), EM089 (1894?) Larin-Kyösti
- Joskus virren vierettää (Sometimes you sing a hymn), EM090 (1928?) Rafael Engelberg - Voice
- Joululaulu (Christmas song), EM091 (1912, published 1912) Heikki Rytkönen - Taas kutsuvat kynttilät kirkkahat
- Kadonnut unelma (A lost dream), EM100 (1930 or earlier) Ture Ara (Composed by Erkki Melartin as pseudonym Erkki Mela)
- Kallis Asia (A precious thing), EM101 (1928?) pseudonym Hiland - Voice
- Karjalan vahti (Sentinel of Carelia), EM104 (1920, published 1921) Axel Stenius - Karelens vakt - Käkisalmen läänin rykmentin kunniamarssi - Kexholms läns regementes honörsmarsch
- Katajaisten marssi (March of Katajaiset), EM105 (1927, published) Arvid Lydecken – Voice or unison choir and piano
- Katseet kiehtovat (Charming looks), EM106 (1930s) Erkki Melartin - Voice
- Katson virran kalvohon (I look at the river), EM107 (1928 or earlier, published 1928) Veikko Antero Koskenniemi - Voice
- Kehtolaulu (Lullaby), EM108 (1926, published 1926) Arvily - Nyt on aika pienen miehen unten maille kiiruhtaa
- Keväinen kotiintuminen (Homecoming in springtime), EM110 (1911 or earlier, published 1911) Lauri Soini – Voice
- Komeroista (Out of the closets), EM114 (1928, published 1928) Heikki Välisalmi - Voice
- Korven koski (Rapids in the wilderness), EM115 (1920s?) Rafael Engelberg - Voice
- Kristallen den fina, EM118 (1920s) traditional Swedish text
- Kylän lahdella (On the bay near the village), EM126 (1899) Larin-Kyösti
- Kyntömiehen laulu (Plowman's song), EM127 (1911 or earlied, published 1911 and 1921) Vihtori Auer – Voice
- Käy työhön (Begin the work), EM129 (1928, published 1928) Severi Nuormaa – Voice
- Köyhän lapsen joulukuusi (Poor child's Christmas tree), EM130 (1928, published 1928) Aapo Pärnänen - Voice
- Nachtwache der Liebe, EM132 (1898) Alfred Meissner
- Lempeä laupeus taivainen (Heavenly mercy so sweet), EM133 (1927 or earlier, published 1927) Jussi Snellman - Voice
- Linden har blomst, og solsorten synger, EM135 (1924) Aage Lind
- Lintuseni (My little bird), EM136 (1932) Antti Räty
- Lisbeths sang, EM137 (1918) Erik Moltesen
- Lob des Weines, EM139 (?) Asraki
- Lovsång, EM141 (1933?, published 1954 and 2000) Bengt Lidner - Kiitoslaulu (Kyllikki Solanterä) - Voice and piano or organ
- Långt från land, EM145 (1931 or earlier) Jarl Hemmer
- Maamiehen toukolaulu (Farmer's May song), EM147 (Larin-Kyösti, 1911 or earlier, published 1911) – Voice
- Maamieslaulu (Farmer's song), EM148 (1928 or earlier, published 1928) Eero Eerola - Voice
- Maamieskoululaisten laulu (Farm school song), EM149 (1911 or earlier, published 1911) Eero Eerola - Nuorten maamiesten laulu - Voice
- Manta, EM151 (1930s?) Usko Kemppi, published and recorded 1939 - Voice and musical group - Composed by Erkki Melartin as pseudonym Erkki Mela
- Me seisomme yhtenä (We stand as one), EM153 (1928 or earlier, published 1928) Alfred Saukkonen - Voice
- Meill' on niin kiire (We are so in haste), EM155 (1928 or earlier, published 1928) Eino Leino - Voice
- Meit' runteli routa (We were tormented by the frost), EM157 (1928) Sulo Suortti - Voice
- Mieron nuotioilla (Distant campfires), EM161 (1898?) Eino Leino - Voice
- Mikä olenki utala (How tricky I am), EM162 (1895) J. H. Erkko
- Mount Lavinia, EM163 (1934) Carl Robert Lamm
- Muistathan (Do you remember), EM164 (1931) composition and text by Erkki Melartin as pseudonym Eero Mela – Voice
- Musta kaarti (Black guards), EM165 (1928 or earlier, published 1928) original text Zachris Topelius, in Finnish by Aarni Kouta - Voice
- Mä nurmella uinun (On grass I am slumbering), EM167 (1911 or earlier, published 1911) Niilo Mantere – Voice
- Mädchenlied, EM168 (1898) Otto Julius Bierbaum
- Nouskaa maani nuoret voimat (Youth of my country, stand up), EM169 (1928, published 1928) Heikki Kahila – Voice
- Nuorisoseurakurssilaisten laulu (Song of the youth club students), EM171 (1909, published 1909) Eero Eerola - Nuorisoseuralaisten laulu - Voice
- Nuorukaiselle (To a youngster), EM173 (1928?) Mikko Uotinen - Voice
- När julen ringer, EM175 (1896) Holger Drachmann - Soprano, 2 violins, Violoncello and piano
- Oma maa (My own country), EM176 (1909 or earlier, published 1911) Samuel Gustaf Bergh - Voice
- Orvon laulu (Orphan song), EM178 (1928, published 1928) Eino Leino - Voice
- Orvon valitus (Lament of an orphan), EM179 (1928, published 1928) August Pärnänen - Voice
- Per Spelman, EM183 (1925) traditional Swedish text and melody
- Der Phönix, EM185 (1895) Heinrich Heine
- La Polusstelo, EM190 (1913, published 1913) Nino Runeberg
- Pyhä kevät (Holy spring), EM196 (1911 or earlier, published 1911) Eino Leino – Voice
- På floden, EM197 (1896) Nikolaus Lenau, translation by Viktor Rydberg
- På vägen, EM198 (1929) Arvid Lydecken
- Pälve (A patch of snow-free ground), EM199 (1911 or earlier, published 1911) Irene Mendelin – Voice
- Rannalla (On the shore), EM201 (1908) Veikko Antero Koskenniemi
- Rantakoivulleni (To my beach birch), EM202 (1911 or earlier, published 1911 and later in several song books) Ilmari Kianto – Voice
- Ristin vierelle (Beside the cross), EM204 (1927 or earlier, published 1927) teksti pseudonym "T.H.", – Originally for reciter, mixed choir, arranged for one voice
- Rosa, EM205 (1928?) traditional Italian text and melody - La mamma di Rosa - Canto popolare di Napoli
- Salakari (Range of rocks), EM206 (1929, published 1929) Ture Ara - Karjalainen valssi (Carelian waltz) - (Composed by Erkki Melartin as pseudonym Eero Mela)
- Samarialainen vaimo (La Samaritaine - The Woman of Samaria), EM208 (1927) Edmond Rostand, in Finnish by Jalmari Finne
- Seppä (Blacksmith), EM211 (1928, published 1928) pseudonym G. A. L. – Voice
- Simo Hurtta, EM213 (1908) Eino Leino – Voice and kantele, see Other dramatic works
- Sjung!, EM215 (1913, published 1913) pseudonym Sylvia
- Den stulna kyssen, EM220 (1925?, published) Arvid Lydecken
- Sureva (Mourning), EM223 (1895-1897, published 1928 with a title Pois meni merehen päivä) Samuel Gustaf Bergh
- Suru (Grief), EM224 (1929) traditional Finnish text
- Syystervehdys opistolle (Autumn greeting to the college), EM226 (1928, published 1928) Oili Ora - Voice
- Tehtaantytön laulu (Factory girl's song), EM231 (1928, published 1928) Hiland Liinamaa – Voice
- Terve, terve Väinämöinen (Hail Väinämöinen), EM232 (1920s?) Jussi Snellman - Voice
- Toivojen tammi, veljespuu (The oak of hope), EM233 (1928, published 1928) Osmo Orjanheimo - Voice
- Toukolaulu (May song), EM234 (1911 or earlier, published 1911) Eero Eerola - Voice
- Tuli tuttu, vanha tuttu! (A friend, an old friend!), EM236 (1911 or earlier, published 1911) Larin-Kyösti – Voice
- Tuoll' on mun kultani (There goes my sweetheart), EM238 (1920s?) traditional Finnish text and melody
- Tuomenkukka (Bird cherry flower), EM240 (1920s?) pseudonym Astrid – Voice
- Tuutulaulu (Lullaby), EM241 (1908) Julius Krohn
- Työ and vapaus (Work and freedom), EM242 (1928 or earlier) Yrjö Veijola – Voice (arrangement for mixed choir published in 1956)
- Työnraatajan laulu (Song of a drudge), EM243 (1928, published 1928) Heikki Välisalmi – Voice
- Ukko-Pekan laulu (Song of Ukko-Pekka), EM245 (1936) Jussi Snellman - Pekan laulu (Ukko-Pekka is president of Finland [Pehr Evind Svinhufvud])
- Unga tankar, EM246 (1893) Nisse Holmberg
- Uus' ajanjakso alkaa (A new era is beginning), EM247 (1911 or earlier, published 1911) Niilo Mantere – Voice
- Veni Sancte Spiritus, EM251 (1900) liturgical text
- En visa i gammal stil, EM253 (1926) Märta Skarp
- Vuoren uumeniin (To the depths of the mountain), EM255 (1928, published 1928) Lauri Viljanen - Voice
- Yhteistyöhön yhteisvoimin (Together and united), EM259 (1928, published 1928) pseudonym Rautakoura - Voice
- Ylösnousemus (Resurresction), EM260 (1928, published 1928) Pietari Salmenoand – Voice
- Å ruusorna visna, EM262 (1912) Elin Golovin? - Och rosorna vissna - Å rusarna visna - Piano and text
- Äitien internationaali (Mothers' international), EM264 (1928, published 1928) anonymous text and translator - Voice
- Äitini (My mother), EM265 (1911 or earlier, published 1911) Zachris Topelius, in Finnish by Alpo Noponen – Voice
- Älfvan till flickan, EM266 (1902) Viktor Rydberg - Älvan till flickan
- Öisiä ääniä kuunneltiin (Listening to nightly sounds), EM267 (1935) traditional text - Humalamäen sillalla nätin tytön rinnalla
- 7 canti popolari italiani, EM268 (1928, published 1929) traditional Italian folk songs, translations in Finnish by Jussi Snellman and in Swedish by Nino Runeberg, - 7 italialaista kansanlaulua - 7 italienska folkvisor - Sette canti popolari italiani
  1. Senti a me! - Kuule mua! - Hör på mig!
  2. Quello che tu mi dici - Muut' älä vaadi multa - Nej, nej!
  3. La vera Sorrentina - Armaani - Den sköna från Sorrento
  4. Il Cavadenti - Hammastohtori - Tanddoktorn
  5. Padrona crudele - Julma nainen - Den grymma flickan
  6. Lisa mia! - Liisa kulta! - Sköna Lisa!
  7. Mariannina - Taas mun täytyy sulle muistuttaa muita mielessäs ei olla saa - Jag har sagt det tusen gånger
- 10 pikkulaulua (10 small songs), EM269 (1930-luku?)
  1. Mansikkalaulu (Strawberry song) Arvily
  2. Lapselle (To a child) Annikki Setälä
  3. Kauranteko (Oats) Einari Vuorela
  4. Kevät (Spring) pseudonym Inkeri
  5. Jouluaamuna (Christmas morning) pseudonym Cartouche
  6. Kotitonttu (Home nisse) Annikki Setälä
  7. Satu (Fairy tale) Elina Vaara
  8. Laulu pikku veikolle (Song to little brother) Elina Vaara
  9. Isän silmät (Father's eyes) Lempi Vihervaara
  10. Orava (Squirrel) pseudonym Pikku prinssi
- An Dionysos, EM290 (1898) Anacreon, translation in German Jacob Achilles Mähly
- Ballade, EM304 (1900) Ottokar Kernstock
- Ballatella, EM306 (1899) anonymous text
- Det bodde en furste i Urvädersgränd, EM327A (1921) Harriet Löwenhjelm
- Efteraar, EM328 (1916) Poul Andersen – sketch without text - Efterår
- Etäällä emostaan (Far from mother), EM334 (?) anonymous text
- Foraar, EM337 (1897) Ludvig Holstein - Forår
- Frühlingszeit, EM339 (1895) Aleksey Konstantinovich Tolstoy, translation by Friedrich Fiedler
- Hans Vili synger, EM358 (?) traditional text? - Lad Verden gaa
- Hautalaulu (Grave song), EM359 (1920s) anonymous – Part of the Finnish Rosicrucian ritual music (EM518)
- Hälsning i toner, EM369 (1932) Georg Mellin
- Höstkväll, EM371 (?)Viktor Rydberg - Höstqväll
- I aften hører jeg, EM372 (1898) Valdemar Rørdam
- Im April, EM377 (1898) Emanuel Geibel
- Iwan och Gawian, EM393 (1897, lost) Oscar Levertin
- Jeg læste i de gamle enfoldige Legende, EM395 (1914) anonymous - Voice
- Kaisu Katariina, EM402 (1931) Music and text by Erkki Melartin as pseudonym Eero Mela
- Koivun valitus (Lament of a birch tree), EM413B (1921, lost) Kalevala
- Koko maailman polska (Polska for the whole world), EM414 (1901) Finnish folk song
- König, EM419 (1900) anonymous
- König bin ich! , EM420 (?)anonymous
- Laulu Kalevalasta (Song from Kalevala), EM423 (1900?) Kalevala
- Laulu valon sodassa (Song of light war), EM424 (1905) Eino Leino
- Die Lehre, EM425 (1890s?) Heinrich Heine
- Liebesjubel, EM430 (1898) Ernst von Wolzogen
- Liebesjubel, EM431 (1899) Ernst von Wolzogen
- Lied, EM432 (1898) Arno Holz - Aus weissen Wolken
- Litania, EM438 (1920's?) anonymous – Voice - Efter slutad kamp i gruset
- Loppulaulu (Ending song), EM439 (1920s) maybe Jussi Snellman - Part of the Finnish Rosicrucian ritual music (EM518) - Yö jo hallitsee, rauha vallitsee
- Luojan lintu (Bird of the Creator), EM441 (1904 or later) J. H. Erkko
- Mikä lie minunki luonut (Who has created me), EM463 (1900) Kalevala - Voice
- Min moder, EM464 (1928) Laurits Christian Nielsen – sketch without text
- Mjölnarens dotter, EM467A (1892) Alfred Tennyson, translated by "G. v. B."
- Modersmaalet, EM468 (1896) Nikolai Frederik Severin Grundtvig - sketch without text
- Morgonvinden, EM471 (1896) Anders Grafström
- Det odödliga, EM477 (1927) Karin Ek
- Outo mies, EM480 (1920s?) Unto Koskela
- Paimenelta, EM481 (1894) J. H. Erkko - Lauloipa mullekin laakson lintu
- Paimenpoika, EM482 (Immi Hellén, ?) - Voice
- Partasuupukki, EM483 (tekstin anonymous, 1927) – Voice (ilman tekstiä)
- På Heden, EM511 (1898?) Valdemar Rørdam - Paa Heden
- Pääskyselle (To a swallow), EM512 (1892) Jooseppi Mustakallio – Same text but different melody than in Op. 107, No. 3
- Da Rauber, EM514 (1894) – folk song from Tyrol
- Rauha (Piece), EM515 (1898) Eino Leino
- Reisliv, EM516 (?) anonymous
- Salainen saari (Our hidden island), EM521 (1920) Jussi Snellman
- Scherzo för sång utan ord, EM529 (1917) - Voice, piano and violin, no text
- Der Seelenkranke, EM530 (1896) Nikolaus Lenau
- Som våg emot stranden, EM542 (1919) Jacob Tegengren
- Suomen lippulaulu (Flag song of Finland), EM551 (1918?) Larin-Kyösti
- Takamailla (Backwoods), EM554 (1899?) Larin-Kyösti
- Till honom, EM556 (1898) Arvid Mörne
- Till Ida Quarnström på 70 årsdagen, EM557 (1918) anonymous
- Unendlicher Canon, EM563 (1913) Adelbert von Chamisso
- Unendlicher Canon, EM564 (1915) Adelbert von Chamisso
- Vereinsamt, EM571 (1890-luku?) Friedrich Nietzsche
- En visa om mig och narren Herkules, EM575 (1897) Gustaf Fröding
- Visan om trösten, EM576 (1903) Fanny Norrman - Voice
- Yksin, EM578 (1915) – No text
- Young leaves, EM579 (1935) Sarojini Naidu

== Melodramas (reciter and accompanying instrument(s) ==
- Maria, Op. 108 (1915) Veikko Antero Koskenniemi - Neitsyt Maarian rukous - Nu stiger månen bak Libanons fjäll (Nino Runeberg) - Reciter with harp or piano (melodrama)
- Marjatan laulu (Marjatta's song), Op. 145, No. 1 (1928) Eino Leino - Marjattas sång (Rafael Lindqvist) – Reciter and piano (melodrama)
- Stridsmännen i berget, Op. 145, No. 2 (1928) Jarl Hemmer - Vuoren sotijat (L. Onerva) – Reciter and piano (melodrama)
- Columbus, Op. 175, No. 1 (1935) Nino Runeberg, unpublished – Reciter and piano
- Nordens sommar, Op. 175, No. 2 (1935) Jarl Hemmer, unpublished - Pohjolan suvi (Jussi Snellman) – Reciter and piano
- I kvällen stund ur furuskogens gömma, EM073 (1902) Sven Falck? - Melodram före tablån - Reciter and piano
- Angelika, EM299 (1901) Bernhard Elis Malmström – Reciter and piano
- Nuori Väinämöinen (Young Väinämöinen), EM476 (1929) Eino Leino – Reciter and piano
- Vapautettu kuningatar, EM570 (1907) Paavo Cajander – Reciter and piano

In addition several dramatic works by Melartin contain part for a reciter.

== Compositions for a voice and orchestra ==
- Irma impi (Maid Irma), Op. 31, No. 1 (1904 or earlier, unpublished) Eino Leino - Ballad för sopran och orkester
- Torre di Nerone, Op. 31, No. 2 (1904, unpublished) August von Platen-Hallermünde, translation by Giosuè Carducci – Baryton and orchestra
- Betlehems stjärna, Op. 31, No. 3 (1897) Viktor Rydberg - Soprano, mixed choir, piano, harmonium and 2 violins - Beetlehemin tähti (Hilkka Norkamo) - Published only as an arrangement for a choir in 1979
- Marjatta, Op. 79 (1914) Kalevala – Soprano and orchestra
- Alalá, EM008 (1924) Spanish folk song - Voice and string orchestra
- Karjalainen kansanlaulusarja I (Carelian suite of folk songs I), EM103 (1930) Carelian folk songs - Voice and string orchestra
  1. Pilvet ne varjosti - 2. Rallati koputin - 3. Pappani pellolla - 4. Hyvästijättö - 5. Kun etelästä tuulee - 6. Sureva - 7. Heilani - 8. Naapurin likka
- Meiram, EM156 (1899-1902) Eino Leino – Voices and orchestra, see Other dramatic works
- Tuoll' on mun kultani, EM239 (1920s) Finnish folk song

== Choral works ==
Cantatas and dramatic works with choir parts are listed under respective entries.

- Vårdträdet, Op. 51, No. 1 (1903) Viktor Rydberg - Male choir and orchestra
- Ilmarisen nuoruus (Youth of Ilmarinen), Op. 51, No. 2 (1908, unpublished) Eino Leino – Baryton, male choir and orchestra
- Ikävä (Dullness), Op. 57, No. 1 (1908?) J. H. Erkko - Male choir
- Jungfru Maria i rosengård, Op. 57, No. 2 (1900 or earlier) Viktor Rydberg - Male choir
- Nu är det helg över hafvet, Op. 57, No. 3 (1898-1900) Vilhelm Krag - Male choir
- Olla mullai (I wish I had), Op. 57, No. 4 (1899?) Ilmari Kianto - Male choir
- Häälaulu (Wedding song), Op. 57, No. 5 (1907) J. H. Erkko - Male choir
- Savolle (To Savo), Op. 57, No. 6 (1907) August Snellman – Male or mixed choir
- För si sådan är kärlekens begäran, Op. 57, No. 7 (1903-1904) Mikael Lybeck - Male choir
- Selvä mies (A sober man), Op. 57, No. 9 (1909) Kanteletar Mixed choir
- Till fosterlandet, Op. 61, No. 1 (1909 or earlier) Rafael Lindqvist - Mixed choir - Isänmaalle (Jalmari Finne) - Published as piano arrangement by Melartin1909
- Var redo!, Op. 61, No. 2 (1911) Nino Runeberg - Marsch för boyscouts - Partiopoikain Marssi - Mixed choir - Ollos valmis (Jalmari Finne) - Published as piano arrangement by Melartin1911
- Kansanvalta (Power of the people), Op. 61, No. 3 (1910) Eino Leino – Unison choir and piano
- Päivän laulu (Song of the day), Op. 61, No. 4 (1903) Eino Leino - Unison choir and piano –arrangements for female choir (Melartin) and mixed choir (P. J. Hannikainen) published
- Karjalalle (For Carelia), Op. 61, No. 5 (1908) A. Söderman - Mixed choir and piano - Laulu Karjalalle
- Aattehet (Ideas), Op. 61b, No. 1 (1909 or earlier) J. H. Erkko - Mixed choir
- Vappulaulu, Op. 61b, No. 2 (1911) Larin-Kyösti – Unison choir – arrangement for mixed choir (Melartin) published
- Aamulla (In the morning), Op. 61b, No. 3 (1905) J. H. Erkko - Mixed choir
- Aittalaulu (Granary song), Op. 61b, No. 4 (1907) Larin-Kyösti - Mixed choir
- Darthulas gravsång, Op. 61b, No. 5 (1897) Johan Ludvig Runeberg - Mixed choir - Darthulan hautalaulu (Yrjö Veijola)
- Kukat Pinciolla (Flowers on Pincio), Op. 61b, No. 6 (1911) J. H. Erkko – – Unison choir – arrangement for mixed choir (Melartin) published
- Piirilaulu (Circuit song), Op. 61b, No. 7 (1913 or earlier) Finnish folk song - Mixed choir
- Sju små julsånger, Op. 103 (1918 or earlier) - 7 små julsånger - 7 pientä joululaulua - Seitsemän pientä joululaulua – Unison choir and piano or harmonium – Translations by Jussi Snellman
  1. Till Betlehem (Johan Michaël Lindblad) - Betlehemiin
  2. Ende Sonen stiger neder (P. W-I.) - Poika isän ainokainen – Arrangement for children's choir (Lars Johan Gustav Stråhle) – arrangement for voice and string quartet (Ilkka Kuusisto)
  3. Du strålande Betlehemsstjärna (tekstin tekijää ei tiedetä) - Yön keskellä tähtönen loisti
  4. I Betlehem lyste en stjärna (Mikael Nyberg) - Jo paistavi tähtönen Betlehemin
  5. Se natten flyr (Johan Olof Wallin) - Kas yössä kirkkaus leimuaa - Mixed choir
  6. Himmelens Herre har kommit till jorden (anonymous) - Taivasten Herran nyt maan syli sulkee - Mixed choir
  7. Jag vet ett namn (Lina Sandell) - Mä tunnen nimen rakkahan - Mixed choir
- 7 psalmer (7 hymns), Op. 113 (1914) - 7 virttä - Mixed choir
  1. Bön om frid (Johan Ludvig Runeberg) - Rauha (Alpo Noponen)
  2. En psalm (Jag ber till dig i mitt betryck) (Oscar Levertin) - Virsi (Sua, Herra huudan tuskassain) (Ilta Koskimies)
  3. Aftonpsalm (I Herrens hand) (Johan Ludvig Runeberg) - Iltavirsi (Ma Herran huomaan) (Alpo Noponen)
  4. Morgonpsalm (I mörker höljs) (Johan Ludvig Runeberg) - Aamuvirsi (Yö hälveni, and päivä luo nyt kirkkaiks' ilman rannat) (Alpo Noponen)
  5. Förbliv hos mig (anonymous) - Luoksein jää! (Ilta Koskimies)
  6. Bön i landsplåga (Johan Ludvig Runeberg) - Rukous maanvaivassa (Ilta Koskimies)
  7. Psalme (Tag mod Vorherres sendebud) (Erik Moltesen) - Virsi (Nyt saapuu Herran sanoma) (Jussi Snellman)
- Sekakuorolauluja (Songs for mixed choir), Op. 142 - Mixed choir
  1. Minä seison (I stand) (1927) Aini Setälä
  2. Takamailla (In the backwoods) (1928) Larin-Kyösti
  3. And nythän on taasen helluntai (Now is the time of whitsun) (1927) Larin-Kyösti
  4. Helluntain hymni (Hymn of the whitsun) (1927) Väinö Kolkkala
  5. Eespäin! (Forward!) (1927?) Josef Julius Wecksell, translation Topi Kallio
  6. Hanget soi (Snow crusts are clinging) (1927?) Eino Leino
  7. Syyskuun kesä (Summer in September) (1899) Juhani Aho
  8. Kevätlaulu (Spring song) (1927?) Johann Wolfgang von Goethe, translation Otto Manninen
- Kolme duettoa (Three duets), Op. 155 (1929 or earlier) - Tre duetter – Two voices and piano
  1. Pyyntö (A plea) Yrjö Teppo - Åkallan (Nino Runeberg)
  2. Tähtien laulu (Song of the stars) Arvid Lydecken - Stjärnornas sång (Nino Runeberg)
  3. Onnelliset (The happy ones) pseudonym Ignotus - Sällhet (Nino Runeberg)
- Sju mystiska botpsalmer (Seven mystic penitence psalms), Op. 182 (1910/1934, unpublished) Nino Runeberg - Mixed choir
  1. Modestia
  2. Silentium
  3. Castitas
  4. Fortitudo
  5. Munificentia
  6. Amor mortis
  7. Amor proximi
- Alla taivahan tähtikorkean (Under the heaven and the stars), EM010 (1927 or earlier) Jussi Snellman - Mixed choir
- Din boning, Herre, EM035 (1927) Jacob Tegengren - Mixed choir?
- Djäknevisa, EM036 (1924, published 1925) Ernst V. Knape - Teinilaulu (L. Onerva) – Mixed choir
- Elannon laulu II (Song for Elanto II, EM039 (1930, published 1933) Yrjö Jylhä - Elantos sång (Elmer Diktonius) – Mixed choir
- Fuga - Benedictus - Canon, EM052 (1896?) liturgical text – Mixed choir or a song group and string quartet
- Gud välsigne, EM058 (1927) maybe Anders Gustaf Lindqvist – Mixed choir
- Halleluja, EM059 (1901) – Mixed choir and organ (text contains only on word, Halleluja)
- Herra, Luoja, taivasten (Lord, Creator of the heavens), EM065 (1927 or earlier, published 1927) A. Oksanen – Unison choir
- Hur ljuvliga äro icke dina boningar, Herre Sebaoth, EM070 (1926) The Bible - Liturgy and Mixed choir
- Hymnus, EM071 (19111/1932) Erkki Melartin and Jussi Snellman - Hymni - Hymni Helsingin konservatoriotalon vihkiäistilaisuuteen – Unison choir and orchestra
- Jesus Kristus kommen är, EM088 (1895) Aurelius Ambrosius – Mixed choir
- Jouluna (At Christmas), EM092 (1926 or earlier, published 1926) Aukusti Simelius - Mixed choir
- Jouluyö (Christmas night), EM094 (1925 or earlier, published 1925 and 1927) Jussi Snellman - Nukkuu maa kuin kuolon unta – Unison choir
- Joutsenet, EM095 (1909, published 1911) Otto Manninen – Two voices
- Juldagen, EM097 (1926) The Bible - Reciter and choir
- Kaarlo ja Emelie Bergbomin muistolle, EM099 (To the memory of Kaarlo and Emilie Bergbom) (1907, published 1907) A. V. Koskimies - Kaarlo and Emelie Bergbomin patsasta paljastaissa 19 2/X 07 - Vid aftäckningen af Kaarlo och Emelie bergboms grafmonument (Bertel Gripenberg) - Mixed choir
- Katajaisten marssi (March of Katajaiset), EM105 (?, published) Arvid Lydecken – Unison choir and piano
- Kulkurin virsi (Vagabond's hymn), EM119 (1914) Larin-Kyösti - Male choir
- Kullan luo (Going to my dearest), EM120 (1896, published 1898) J. H. Erkko - Mixed choir or four voices
- Kummanko sävel somempi (Whose melody is the prettiest), EM121 (1925, published 1925) A. O. Väisänen – Male choir
- Kuoleman kautta (Through death), EM122 (1927) Jussi Snellman – Alto, tenor and piano
- Kvällsvind spelade, EM124 (1903, published 1907) Mikael Lybeck – Mixed choir - Soittaa tuulonen (Jussi Snellman)
- Kyntömiehen laulu (Song of the plowman), EM127 (1911 or earlier) Vihtori Auer, published 1911 for one voice – arrangement for mixed choir and piano published 1921
- Kyrie, EM128 (1932) liturgical text – Four voices or mixed choir and piano or organ
- Luojan päivä (Day of the Creator), EM142 (1933) Jussi Snellman – Three female voices or female choir
- Me kasvamme (We are growing), EM152 (1901 or earlier, published 1901) Eino Leino - Vi växa (K. V. Forsman or Thekla Roschier) - Male choir
- Nu börand himmelens stjärnor blekna, EM170 (1902?) anonymous – female choir, reciter and piano quartet
- Nuorten laulu (Song of the youth), EM172 (1908, published 1916) Eino Leino - Suomen Koulunuorisoliiton marssi - Mixed choir
- Osuustoimintamarssi (Cooperation march), EM180 (1932) Uuno Kailas - Mixed choir
- Ota se kaunis kannel taas (Take that beautiful kantele again), EM181 (1901, published 1935) Larin-Kyösti – Male choir and tenor solo
- Perún, EM184 (1898) Mikael Lybeck - Male choir
- La Polusstelo, EM190 (1913, published 1913) Nino Runeberg - Himno de Finnlandaj Esperantistoi - Suomen esperantistien hymni- Male choir
- Le revéil du bois, EM203 (1917) Victor Kinon - Soprano, choir and orchestra
- Saligt är ditt folk, EM207 (1926) Swedish liturgical text – Liturgy and mixed choir
- Savonlinnan toverikunnan marssi (March of the students in Savonlinna), EM209 (1895) August Snellman - Toverikunnan marssi - Mixed choir
- Serenad, EM212 (1895) anonymous - Male choir or male vocal group
- Snöfallet, EM219 (1917, published) Osvald Sirén – Mieskvartetti
- Työ and vapaus (Work and freedom), EM242 (1928) Yrjö Veilin – arranged for mixed choir 1956 (Kaarle Lehtinen)
- Tänk på din skapare, EM244 (1926) The Bible – Liturgy and mixed choir
- Yön tullessa (While the night comes), EM261 (1918) Simo Korpela - Mixed choir
- Äiti armas, kaikkes annoit mulle (Dear mother, you gave me all), EM263 (1928 or earlier, published 1929) Martti Malmgren - Mixed choir
- Agnus Dei, EM277 (1895) liturgical text– Soprano and mixed choir
- En dag i Herrens gårdar, EM326 (1926) The Bible – Liturgy and mixed choir
- Guds rena Lamm! , EM353 (1895) Nicolaus Decius, translation by Olaus Petri – five voices (soprano I, soprano II, alto, tenor and bass)
- Jos voisin (If only I could), EM396 (?) Finnish folk song – Female choir
- Koraali (Chorale), EM415B (1916?, published 1923) – four voices without text
- Koraali (Chorale), EM415C (1923?, published 1923) – four voices without text
- Koraali (Chorale), EM415D (1923?, published 1923) – four voices without text
- Koraali (Chorale), EM415B (1927?, published 1929) – four voices without text
- Olkohon taiteemme niinkuin tammi (Let our art stand like an oak), EM478 (1901) Eino Leino - Male choir
- Porraslaulu (Songs of steps), EM497 (1920s) Jussi Snellman – Mixed choir - Part of the Finnish Rosicrucian ritual music (EM518)
- Requiem, EM517 (1905) liturgical text - Soprano, mezzo-soprano, alto and bass – Not a proper requiem but a short composition for the play Hämärän lapsia (Twilight children).
- Rituaalimusiikkia Ruusu-Ristille (Finnish Rosicrucian ritual music), EM518 (1920s) anonymous – voices and piano – The title is not authentic but a descriptive one.
- Suru ilossa (Sorrow in happiness), EM552 (1895) anonymous – Mixed choir?
- Öppna mitt öga, EM582 (1918) Lina Sandell – Four voices

== Cantatas ==
- Vid frågornas port, Op. 43 (1907) Hjalmar J. Procopé - Kysymysten portilla (Jussi Snellman) - Helsingin yliopiston promootiokantaatti - Promotionskantat 1907 - Published as piano arrangements only.
  1. De frågande - Kysyjät
  2. Sollandet - Auringon maa
  3. Månlandet - Kuutamon maa - Moonland (M. Lockwood)
  4. De sökande - Etsijät
  5. Drömmaren - Uneksija
  6. Livets välde - Elämän valta
  7. Fruktan för döden ingen förlame! - Turhaa on langeta pelkohon kuolon!
  8. Stridssång - Sotalaulu
- Kantat vid Finska Läkarsällskapets hundaårsjubileum (Cantata for the Finnish Medical Society's 100 years celebration), Op. 178 (1935, unpublished) Jarl Hemmer - Örtagårdsmannen - Kantaatti Suomen Lääkäriseuran 100-vuotisjuhlaan – soloists, choir and orchestra
- Etsijä (The Seeker), EM042 (1925) Jussi Snellman – soloists, choir and piano
- Festkantat (Festive cantata), EM102 (1924, published 1939) Jacob Tegengren, translation by Jussi Snellman – mixed choir, reciter and instrumental group
  1. Den tysta hjältemod - Hiljainen sankaruus
  2. Hemmet – Koti
  3. Fosterlandet - Isänmaa
- Koulutiellä (On the way to school), EM117 (1930) Anna Puranen - Porin tyttölyseon 50-vuotisjuhlakantaatti – Soloists, choir and orchestra
- Kylväjät (Planters), EM125 (1925, published 1939) L. Onerva - mixed choir and orchestra (orchestrated by Helvi Leiviskä)

== Symphonies ==
Only No. 6 printed during Melartin's life. Erkki Melartin Society has already edited and published nos 1, 3, 4 and 5 in PDF-format.

- Symphony No. 1, Op. 30, No. 1, C minor (1901-1902, unpublished)
- Symphony No. 2, Op. 30, No. 2, E minor (1904, unpublished)
- Symphony No. 3, Op. 40, F major (1907/1908)
- Symphony No. 4, Op. 80, E major (1912-1913/1916) - Kesäsinfonia - Summer Symphony – There are female voices without text in part Andante
- Symphony No. 5, Op. 90, A minor (1908/1914-1915) - Symphony brevis
- Symphony No. 6, Op. 100 (1918-1924) - Elementtisinfonia - Elementernas symfoni – Symphony of Elements
- Symphony No. 7, Op. 149 (1928/1936?, only the first part Allegro and several sketches exist, unpublished) - Symphony gaia
- Symphony No. 8, Op. 186 (started 1936, unfinished) - Parts: Allegretto – Andante – Allegretto – Intermezzo (Allegretto) – Allegretto – Andante
- Symphony No. 9, Op. 188 (just some structural plans survive)

== Other orchestral works ==
For a large orchestra, unless otherwise stated.

- Legend II, Op. 12 (1900-1901, unpublished – published as piano arrangement)
- Siikajoki, Op. 28 - (1903-1904, unpublished) – Striden vid Siikajoki – Symphonic poem
- Serenadi, Op. 31, No. 4, E major (1904-1906) - String orchestra
  1. A la marcia
  2. Idyll
  3. Menuetto
  4. Canzone
  5. Gavotte - Rondo
- Lyyrillinen sarja II (Lyric suite II), Op. 56 (1908) - Lyrisk svit II - Lyrische Suite II - Published as piano arrangement by Melartin
  1. Iltapäivä - Eftermiddag - Nachmittag
  2. Raskas uni - Tung dröm - Schwerer Traum
  3. Tuutulaulu - Vaggvisa - Wiegenlied
  4. Menuetto
  5. Noitatanssi - Trolldans - Phantastischer Tanz - Fantastischer Tanz
- Traumgesicht, Op. 70 (1910) - Symphonische Musik - Sinfonista musiikkia - Unikuva - Drömsyn – Symphonic poem for orchestra
- Patria, Op. 72 (1911, unpublished) - Symphonic poem for orchestra - Symphonische Studie für grosses Orchester
- Lyydinen sarja (Lydic suite), Op. 102 (1935?) Lydische Suite – Chamber orchestra
- Sursum corda, Op. 125 (1925?, unpublished) - Ylentäkää sydämenne - Ein festliches Präludium - String orchestra
- Laatokan lauluja (Songs of Laatokka), Op. 146a (8.1.1929) - Ladogasånger - Karjalaisia lauluja - Käkisalmen lauluja – Chamber orchestra – Folk song arrangements
- Karjalaisia kuvia (Carelian views), Op. 146b (1928, unpublished) Chamber orchestra - Karelische Rhapsodie für kleines Orchester - Karjalan kuvia
- Intermezzo, Op. 147 (1929, unpublished) - Chamber orchestra
- Divertimento, Op. 152 (1928, unpublished) - Chamber orchestra
  1. Preludio - 2. Menuetto (Pastorale) - 3. Giocoso (Humoreski) - 4. Berceuse - 5. Intermezzo - 6. Elegia - 7. Danza
- Lohdutus (Consolation), Op. 168 (1930-1931?, unpublished) Chamber orchestra - Tröst
- Suomalainen fantasia (Finnish fantasy), Op. 180 (1930s, lost)
- Yksilö ja massa (Individual and the crowd), Op. 184 (1936, unpublished) Ballet music for orchestra - Individen och massan
- Allegretto A minor, EM011 (1930s?)
- An der Pforte, EM013 (beginning of the 1900s?)
- Andante, EM014 (1897, unfinished)
- Capriccio, EM030 (1901)
- Harlekiini (Harlequin), EM061 (1930s?) – Orchestral version of Prinssin tanssi, EM508
- Hymni (Hymn), EM070 (1911)
- Intermezzo, EM081 (1910, published 1993) – String orchestra with a violin solo
- Keijujen karkelo (Dance of the fairies), EM109 (1905, lost) - Älfvornas dans – Älvornas dans
- Kevätaamun unelma (Spring morning dream), EM111 (1905)
- Kuutamossa (Moonlight), EM123 (1930s, arranged by Sven Sandberg)
- Lyyrillinen sarja I (Lyric suite I), EM143 (1906) - Lyrisk suit I - Lyrische Suite I
  1. Preludio (arrangement of opus 25:1)
  2. Certosa (arrangement of opus 27:2)
  3. Intermezzo
  4. Virran reunall (arrangement of opus 25:2)
  5. Idyll (arrangement of opus 27:1)
  6. Ballade (arrangement of opus 27:4)
- Lyyrillinen sarja III (Lyric suite III), EM144 (1915-1916) - Lyrische Suite III - Lyrisk svit III - Suite lyrique 3 - Liritšeskaand sjuita - Belgialainen sarja - Vaikutelmia Belgiasta - Impressions de Belgique - Impressions lyriques
  1. La Cathédrale - Katedralen – Tuomiokirkko (arrangement of opus 93:1)
  2. Nocturne - Bruges
  3. Scherzo
  4. Pastorale - Adoration des bergers
  5. Les Cloches – Kellot (arrangement of opus 93:6)
  6. Hymne matinale - Matin sur la côte
- Manaus (Incantation), EM150 (1933) - Shamaanimanaus - Beschwörung
- Muunnelmia Kajanuksen Hautalaulusta (Variations on Kajanus' Grave song), EM166 (1933) - In memoriam Robert Kajanus
- Pastorale, EM182 (1909) - Erakko – Eremiten – Der Einsiedler
- Piccolo minuetto, EM188 (1.5.1912) - String orchestra
- Scéne dansante, EM210 (1930-luku?) - Chamber orchestra
- Symfonisk fantasi, EM226 (1904?, only partially survived) - Sinfoninen fantasia
- Tempo di valse, EM231 (1929)
- Väinämöinen luo kanteleen (Väinämöinen creates his Kantele), EM256 (1906) - Väinämöinen muovailee kantelettaan – Wäinämöinen danar sin Kantele – Tablåmusik
- Aamuhymni (Morning hymn), EM270 (1908?)
- Intermezzo, EM389 (1936)
- Karjalainen rapsodia (Carelian rhapsody), EM407 (1908) - Karels rapsodi – Karjalaisia piirilauluja I
- Scherzo, EM526 (1905)
- Shamaanin kohtaus (Shaman scene), EM531 (1929) – Orchestra and wordless choir – Planned as a part of ballet Sininen helmi, Op. 160, but left out
- Sinfoninen andante (Symphonic andante), EM533 (1901, lost)

== Works for solo piano ==
- Variationen und Fuge, Op. 2 (1898) – Dedicated to Selim Palmgren
- 2 Balladen, Op. 5 (1898) Två ballader
  1. Två svanor - Kaksi joutsenta - Zwei Schwäne
  2. Anime sole
- Legend I, Op. 6 (1898) - Legenda I – Legende I
- Lastuja I (Chips I), Op. 7 (1900 or earlier) - Spånor I - Späne I
  1. Ro, ro, fiskarmor - Kalastajan kehtolaulu - Vanha kehtolaulu - Old cradle song - Schlaflied
  2. Suvi-illan vieno tuuli
  3. Keinutan kehtoa
  4. Jeg synes, at verden skinner
  5. Ej har jag hem
  6. Jag vill still tacka dig
- 3 Stücke für Clavier, Op. 8 (Lokakuu 1899)
  1. Elegie
  2. Romance
  3. Nacht
- Lastuja II (Chips II), Op. 9 (1898 -1900) - Spånor II - Späne II
  1. Iltalaulu - Aftonsång - Abendlied
  2. Kehtolaulu - Vaggvisa - Schlaflied
  3. Melodia - Melodi - Melodie
  4. Kevätlaulu - Vårsång - Frühlingslied - Spring song
  5. L'heure bleue - Sininen tunti
  6. Hautauslaulu - Begravningssång - Grablied
- Skizzer (Sketches), Op. 11 (1901) - 5 stycken för piano
  1. Frid - Rauha - Stille - Quietude
  2. Midnatt - Keskiyö - Mitternacht - Midnight
  3. Hösttankar - Syysaatteita - Herbstgedanken - Autumns thoughts
  4. Liten ballad - Pieni ballaadi - Kleine Ballade - Little ballad
  5. Från Karelen - Karjalasta - Finnish - Finnish folksong
- Legend II, Op. 12 (1900-1901) – Legenda II
- Intermezzi, Op. 16 (1902 or earlier)
  1. Ratsastaja metsässä - Ryttaren i skogen - Der Reiter im Walde - The Rider
  2. Chanson
  3. Tanssilaulu I Dansvisa I - Tanzweise I - Two dances I
  4. Tanssilaulu II Dansvisa II - Tanzweise II - Two dances II
  5. Menuett
- Lyyrillisiä pikkukappaleita (Lyric pieces), Op. 18 (1903 or earlier) - Lyrische Stücke - Lyriska småstycken - Lyriska stycken
  1. Kansanlaulun tapaan - I folkvisestil - Lied im Volkston
  2. Vuorella - På berget - Auf dem Berge
  3. Rannalla - Vid stranden - Am Strande
  4. Iltakuva - Aftonbild - Abendbild
  5. Kesäilta Sommarafton - Sommerabend (folk song arrangement)
- Pienoiskuvia I (Miniatures), Op. 23 (1905 or earlier) - Miniatyrer för pianoforte - 8 leichte Stücke
  1. Menuetto
  2. Valssi - Vals
  3. Kehtolaulu - Vaggvisa
  4. Ilta - Afton
  5. Japanilainen tanssi - Japansk dans
  6. Pastorale
  7. Odottava - Den väntande
  8. Tarantella
- Prélude B♭ minor, Op. 25, No. 1 (1906)
- Virran reunall (On the banks of a river), Op. 25, No. 2 (sovitettu 1903)
- Humoresk A major, Op. 25, No. 3 (1906 or earlier)
- Arietta, Op. 25, No. 4 (1898 or earlier) - Arietta all'antica – free arrangement for violin and piano by Willy Burmester published 1912
- Pieni gavotti (A little gavotte), Op. 25, No. 5 (1901) - Gavotte i gammal stil – free arrangement for violin and piano by Willy Burmester published 1912
- Idyll, Op. 27, No. 1 (1906 or earlier) - Idylli
- Certosa, Op. 27, No. 2 (1906 or earlier)
- Suomen salossa, Op. 27, No. 3 (1898?)
- Ballade, Op. 27, No. 4 (1906?) - Balladi
- Små variationer, Op. 33, No. 1 (1906) - Pieniä variatsiooneand - Pieniä variationeand - Kleine Variationen
- Etyde E major, Op. 33, No. 2 (1897)
- Träskodans (Clog dance), Op. 33, No. 3 (1906 or earlier) - Puukenkätanssi - Holzschuhtanz
- Lastuja III, Op. 34 (1906) - Spånor III - Späne III - Chips III
  1. Praeludium
  2. Berceuse
  3. Au revoir
  4. Suomalainen tanssi - Finsk dans - Finnischer Tanz
  5. Orientale
- Pienoiskuvia II (Miniatures II), Op. 35 (1906 or earlier) - Miniatyrer för piano II
  1. Venezialainen ilta - Veneziansk afton - Venezianischer Abend
  2. Iltatunnelma - Aftonstämning - Abendstimmung
  3. Valitus - Klagan - Klage
  4. Aamu - Morgon - Morgen
  5. Sairasvuoteella - På sjukbädden - Auf dem Krankenbett
  6. Tanssi - Dans - Tanz
  7. Laulu - Visa - Lied
  8. Kehruulaulu - Spinnvisa - Spinnerlied
- Lastuja IV (Chips IV), Op. 48 (1907) - Spånor IV - Späne IV
  1. Tuutulaulu - Vid vaggan - An der Wiege
  2. Pieniä variationeja - Miniatyr variationer - Miniaturvariationen - Små variationer - Kleine Variationen
  3. Aaltoja - Böljor - Wellen
  4. Tapisserie
  5. Jäähyväiset - Avsked - Abschied
- Walzer-Miniatyren, Op. 49 (1907)
  1. Anette-Sofie
  2. Thérèse
  3. Adèle
  4. Violet
- Der traurige Garten, Op. 52 (1908) - Surullinen puutarha – Dedicated to Jean Sibelius
  1. Wir zwei - Me kaksi
  2. Liebesallee - Lemmentie - Rakastavien tie
  3. Wiegenlied eines Bettlerkindes - Kerjäläislapsen kehtolaulu
  4. Regen - Sade
  5. Solitude - Yksinäisyys
- Pienoiskuvia III (Miniatures III), Op. 53 (1908) - Miniatyrer III
  1. Suomalainen laulu -Finsk visa - Finnisches Lied
  2. Muisto - Minne - Erinnegung
  3. Valse lente
  4. Menuette al' antico
  5. Suomalainen tanssi - Finsk dans - Finnischer Tanz
  6. Preludio
  7. Fughetta
- Tunnelmia (Moods), Op. 54 (1908 or earlier) - Stämningar - Stimmungen
  1. Omistus - Tillegnan - Zueignung
  2. Raskaalla hetkellä - Under en tung stund - Während einer schweren Stunde
  3. Capriccio
  4. Kysymys - En fråga - Eine Frage
  5. Kansanlaulu - Folkvisa - Volkslied
  6. Energico
- Lyrik I (Lyric pieces), Op. 59 (1909) - Lyyrillisiä pianokappaleita - Lyrisches
  1. Barcarole
  2. Romance
  3. Berceuse
  4. Intermezzo
  5. Impromptu E minor
- Mazurka, Op. 66, C minor (1910)
- Vier Klavierstücke (Four piano pieces), Op. 67 (1910 or earlier)
  1. Abendklang - Iltasointi - Iltasointi
  2. Scherzo Es major
  3. Elegie
  4. Brauttanz - Morsiustanssi
- Berceuse, Op. 68, F major (1910 or earlier)
- Quatre morceaux, Op. 75 (1913 or earlier)
  1. Humoresque - Humoreske
  2. Chant du Juillet - Juli-Lied
  3. Berceuse, cis-molli
  4. Aubade
- 9 pientä kappaletta pianolle (9 small pieces for piano), Op. 76 (1913 or earlier) - 9 Små stycken för piano - 9 Kleine Stücke für Klavier
  1. Metsäruusu - Waldrose - Vildros - A hedge rose
  2. Piiritanssi - Ringelreigen - Ringdans - Roundelay
  3. Ländler - Country dance
  4. Melodia - Melodie - Melodi - Melody
  5. Vanha taru - Es ist eine alte Geschichte - En gammal sägen - An old story
  6. Muistikirjan lehti - Albumblatt - Albumblad - Album leaf
  7. Kansanlaulu - Volkslied - Folkvisa - Folksong
  8. Iltarauha - Abendruhe - Aftonlugn - Evening rest
  9. Tanssi - Tänzchen - Dans - Dance
- Kuvakirja I (Book of images I), Op. 81 (1915?) - Bilderbok - Bilderbuch - Helppoja pikkukappaleita pianolle - Lätta småstycken för piano - Leichte Klavierstücke
  1. Illan tullen - När kvällen kommer - Der Abend kommt
  2. Saksalainen kansanlaulu - Tysk folkvisa - Gut'n morgen
  3. Kyyneleittä - Utan tårar - Ohne Tränen
  4. Pieni valkonen perhonen - Den lilla vita fjäriln - Der kleine weisse Schmetterling
  5. Viimeinen kerta - Sista gången - Zum letzten Mal
  6. Pikku tanssi - Liten dans -Tänzchen
- Feuillets d'Album, Op. 83 (1914) - Små stycken för piano
  1. Chanson matinale
  2. Intermezzo
  3. Bagatelle
  4. Esquisse
  5. Menuet
  6. Elegie
  7. Berceuse (pour un coeur triste) - Kehtolaulu väsyneelle sydämelle – arrangement for violin, Violoncello and piano by Melartin published 1928
- Sonatiini pianolle (Sonatine for piano), Op. 84 (1915) - "Quatre Sonatines" – arrangement for violin and piano published
- 24 preludier, Op. 85 (1913-1920) - 24 Präludien - 24 Preludes
  1. Grekisk Offerhandling - Griechische Oppferhandlung - Old Grecian Ceremony
  2. Capriccio
  3. Studie - Study
  4. Méditation - Meditation
  5. Körsbärsblom i Japan - Kirchenblüte in Japan - Cherry Blossoms in Japan - Japanilaisia kirsikankukkia
  6. Afton i Venedig - Abend in Venedig - Evening in Venice
  7. Speldosa - Pelikello - Spieluhr - Musical Box
  8. Tung afton - Schwerer Abend - Evening before the Storm
  9. Lugn afton - Stiller Abend - Quiet Evening
  10. Vinterväg - Winterweg - Winter-Road
  11. Canon
  12. Folkvisa - Volkslied
  13. Scherzino
  14. Höstnatt - Herbstnacht - Autumn-night
  15. Romans - Romanze - Romance
  16. Ballatella
  17. Vårmorgon - Frühlingsmorgen - Spring morning
  18. Robustamente
  19. Intermezzo
  20. Tempo di mazurka
  21. Aning - Ahnung - Presentiment
  22. Beslutet - Beschluss - Decision
  23. Löftet - Versprechen - Promise
  24. Energico
- Noli me tangere, Op. 87 (1914 or earlier) - Stämningsbilder - Stimmungsbilder - Impressions
  1. Snöstämning i skymningen - Dämmerung in Schnee - Twilight in the snow
  2. Helgdagsmorgon - Feiertagsmorgen - Pyhäpäivän aamu - A festive morning
  3. Aning - Ahnung - Presentiment - Aavistus
  4. Dödsstund - Todesstunde - The hour of Death
  5. Höstvind - Herbstwind - Autumnal wind
- Miniatyrsvit ur Sanningens pärla, Op. 88a (1915-1920?)
  1. Prolog
  2. Entr'acte
  3. Berceuse
  4. Marche miniature
  5. Polska
- Ljus och skugga (Light and shadow), Op. 91 - Valoa and varjoa - Licht und Schatten - 7 småstycken för piano - 7 pikkukappaletta pianolle - 7 kleine Stücke für Klavier
  1. Morgonvisa - Aamulaulu - Morgenlied (1915)
  2. Skuggan - Varjo - Der Schatten (1898)
  3. I solskenet - Päivänpaisteessa - Im Sonnenschein (1898)
  4. Valse lente (1915)
  5. Preludio (1915)
  6. Afton på berget - Ilta vuorella - Abend auf dem Berge (1915)
  7. Sjömansdans - Merimiestanssi - Matrosentanz (1915)
- Pennteckningar (Pencil drawings), Op. 92 (1915-1916) - Kynäpiirroksia
  1. Hälsning - Tervehdys
  2. Scherzino
  3. Vemod - Surumieli - Traurigkeit - Sadness
  4. Vaggvisa för ett sjukt barn - Kehtolaulu sairaalle lapselle
  5. Chanson triste
  6. Canzoncina
  7. Humoresk
- Per speculum in enigmatae, Op. 93 (1912-1913, unpublished) - Wie in einem Spiegel
  1. Katedralen
  2. Die andere Seite
  3. Dunkle Träume
  4. Schwester Namenlos
  5. Erinnerung published as Souvenir and opus 87a, No. 5 in Finlandia V 1945
  6. Weihnachtsglocken
- 7 pianostycken (7 piano pieces), Op. 98 - 7 pianokappaletta
  1. Den tysta skogen (1917 or earlier) - Hiljainen metsä - La Forêt silancieuse - Der schweigende Wald - Metsätunnelma - Skogsstämning
  2. Skymning vid ån (1917 or earlier) - Dämmerung am Bachesufer - Joen rannalla hämärtää
  3. I höjden (1919 or earlier) - In der Höhe - Korkeudessa - Korkeuksissa - On high - Legenda III - Legend III - Legende III
  4. Gavotte, A major
  5. Romans (1917 or earlier) - Romance - Romans över namnet S-a-s-c-h-a G
  6. Scherzo (1919 or earlier)
  7. Exeunt omnes (1919, only a fragment is known, unpublished)
- Partita in modo antico, Op. 101 (1917 or earlier, unpublished) - Svit i gammal stil
  1. Preludio
  2. Aria
  3. Courante
  4. Giga
- Skuggspel (Shadow play), Op. 104 (1919 or earlier)
  1. Lantlig dans
  2. Ballatella
  3. En hemlighet
  4. Piccola Sarabanda
  5. Tempeldans
  6. Irrbloss
  7. Farväl
- Röster ur Skymningen (Voices from the dusk), Op. 110 (1916-1917) - Ääniä hämäryydestä - 5 pianostycken – Five piano pieces
  1. Barnporträtt - Lapsikuva - Lapsen muotokuva
  2. Menuetto languido
  3. Skymningsdans - Hämärän tanssi
  4. Skymningsbild - Hämärän kuva - Utukuva
  5. Bjällerklang - Kulkunen - Kulkusten kilinä
- Fantasia apocaliptica, Op. 111 (1918-1920?) - Sonat I för piano - Sonata I per il pianoforte - Sonata apocaliptica – Piano sonata I
- Festpreludium (Festival prelude), Op. 112 (1920) Festligt preludium – Guldbröllopsspel – Goldhochzeitsmusik (unpublished)
- En morgondröm och andra stycken för piano, Op. 114 (1910s?, lost)
- Salaperäinen metsä (The mysterious forest), Op. 118 (1923 or earlier) - Den hemlighetsfulla skogen - 6 pianostycken - Miniatyrsvit för piano
  1. Suuskuva - Höstbild - Herbstbild
  2. Salaperäinen metsä - Den hemlighetsfulla skogen - Der geheimnissvolle Wald
  3. Noita - Häxan - Die Hexe
  4. Loitsu - Trollruna - Beschwörung
  5. Virvatulet - Irrblossen - Irrlichten
  6. Noitatanssi - Trolldans - Trolltanz
- Nuorta elämää I (Youth life I), Op. 119a (1922 or earlier) - Ungt liv - Junges Leben - Kappaleita lapsille - Stycken för barn - Kinderstücke
  1. Kävely - Promenad - Spaziergang
  2. Hyräily - Gnolad visa - Stilles Lied
  3. Valitus - Klagan - Klage
  4. Leikki - Lek - Spiel
  5. Kaksi totista setää - Två allvarliga farbföder - Die zwei ernsten Onkel
  6. Nurmella - På ängen - Auf der Wiese
- Nuorta elämää II (Youth life II), Op. 119b (1922 or earlier)
  1. Minuettino
  2. Skotlantilainen kansanlaulu - Skottsk folkvisa - Schottisches Volkslied
  3. Tuutulaulu - Vaggvisa - Schlummerliedchen
  4. Pilvinen ilta - Mulen kväll - Wolkiger Abend
  5. Nuoren tytön laulu - Den unga flilckans visa - Lied des jungen Mädchens
  6. Polska - Bauerntanz - Danse rustique
- Nuorta elämää III (Youth life III), Op. 119c (1922 or earlier)
  1. Hyväily - Une caresse - Smekning - Liebkosung
  2. Karjalaiset paimenet - Karelska herdar - Zwei Hirten aus Karelien
  3. Maantielaulu - Landsvägsvisa
  4. Valsette
  5. Polkette
  6. Onnittelumenuetto - Gratulaticusmenuett - Gratulationsmenuett
- Nuorta elämää IV (Youth life IV), Op. 119d (1922 or earlier)
  1. Jouluvirsi - Julpsalm - Weihnachslied
  2. Surumielinen laulu - Sorgsen visa - Trauriges Lied
  3. Ländler
  4. Pieni marssi - Liten marsch - Kleiner Marsch
  5. Barcarola - Barcarole
  6. Iltakellot - Aftonklockorna - Abendglocken
- Varjokuvia (Silhouettes), Op. 120 (1922 or earlier) - Silhouetter - Schattenrisse
  1. Sisarukset - Syskonen - Die Geschwister
  2. Sureva tyttö - Den sörjande flickan - Das traurige Mädchen
  3. Menuetto hämärässä - Menuett i skymningen - Menuett in der Dämmerung
  4. Partiomarssi - Scoutmarsch - Pfadfindermarsch
  5. Aamuvirsi - Morgonpsalm - Morgenpsalm
  6. Iltavirsi - Aftonpsalm - Abendpsalm
  7. Valse lente
  8. Kansanlaulu - Folkvisa - Volkslied
  9. Iltakuva Karjalasta - Aftonstämning från Karelen - Abendbild aus Karelien
  10. Maalaistanssi - Lantlig dans - Ländlicher Tanz
  11. Retkeilylaulu - Vandringssång - Wanderlied
  12. Humoreski - Humoresk - Humoreske
- Iltarauha (Tranquility of the night), Op. 123, No. 1 (1924) – Aftonro
- Marcia funèbre, Op.123, No. 2 (1925 or earlier)
- Idyll, Op. 123, No. 3 (10.7.1925) - Idylle
- Procession, Op. 123, No. 4 (1925 or earlier)
- Pastorale, Op. 123, No. 5 (15.7.1925)
- Piccola marcia, Op. 123, No. 6 (1926 or earlier)
- Hemlängtan, Op. 126, No. 1 (1924-1925) - Koti-ikävä
- Månskensfart, Op. 126, No. 2 (1924-1925) - Kuutamoyö
- Dans, Op. 126, No. 3(1924-1925) - Tanssi
- Lyrik II (Lyric pieces II), Op. 127 (1924-1925)
  1. Skymningsvisa - Hämärän laulu - Im Zwielicht
  2. Morgonandakt - Aamuhartaus - Morgenandacht
  3. Menuett i väntan - Menuetto odottaessa - Menuett in Erwartung
  4. Valse sentimentale
  5. Österlandsk natt - Itämainen yö - Morgenländische Nacht
  6. Couplett
- Valse miniature, Op. 129, No. 1 (1926 or earlier) - Albumblad – Finsk musik – Sechs Klavierstücke
- Dans, Op. 129, No. 2 (1926 or earlier)
- Intermezzo, Op. 129, No. 3 (1926 or earlier)
- Preludio, Op. 129, No. 4, B major (1926 or earlier)
- Folkvisa, Op. 129, No. 5 (1926 or earlier)
- Jongleur, Op. 129, No. 6 (1926 or earlier)
- Sonatiini pianolle, No. 2 (Sonatine for piano II), Op. 135a (1927, unpublished) - Sonatina II al antica - Sonatina II al'antico – Arranged for flute and harp, see opus 135b
- Romanza, Op. 135, No. 2 (1932, unpublished)
- Kuvia (Pictures), Op. 137 (1927 or earlier) - Bilder - 12 Pientä pianokappaletta nuorisolle - 12 små pianostycken för ungdom (opus number in publication 137a)
  1. Rattoisa retki - Den trevliga utfärden
  2. Linnun hautaus - Fågelns begravning
  3. Kodin kynnyksellä - På hemmets tröskel
  4. Kevätsade - Vårregn
  5. Tuutulaulu - Vaggvisa
  6. Ylpeä ratsu - Den stålte gångaren
  7. Yksinäinen paimen - Den ensamma herden
  8. Kevätiloa - Vårfröjd - Canon
  9. Lumisilla - Leka snöboll
  10. Pilalaulu - Skämtvisa
  11. Tumma ilta - Mörk afton
  12. Leikki - Lek - Intermezzo
- Kaksi viikkoa (Two weeks), Op. 143 (1928?) - Viikonpäivät - Pianokappaleita nuorisolle
  1. Viisi sormea (Five fingers)
  2. Vastakkain (Against each other)
  3. Leikki (Play)
  4. Tanssi hämärissä (Dance in twilight)
  5. Torvet (Horns)
  6. Kyläsoittaja (Village fiddler)
  7. Sunnuntairauha (Sunday peace)
- Pyhä and arki (The holy and the everyday), Op. 144 (1924-1925) - Helg och söcken - Feier- und Werktage - 7 pientä pianokappaletta nuorisolle - 7 småstycken för piano för ungdom - 7 kleine Stücke für die Jugend
  1. Enkelten laulu jouluyössä - Änglarnas sång julnatten - Der Gesang der Engel in der Christnacht
  2. Lasten joululaulu - Barnens julvisa - Der Kinder Weihnachtslied
  3. Työtä aljettaissa - Vid arbetets begynnelse - Beim Beginn der Arbeit
  4. Korvessa - I storskogen - Im Walde
  5. Rantakuva - Strandbild
  6. Japanilainen kuva - Japansk bild - Japanisches Bild
  7. Loppumarssi - Slutmarsch - Schlussmarsch
- Helmivyö I (String of pearls I), Op. 159a (1929) - Pärlbandet I - Suomen kauneimmat kansanlaulut Suomen nuorisolle - Finlands vackraste folkvisor för Finlands ungdom
- 1. Maamme (Vårt land – Our country) / Composer Fredrik Pacius - 2. Matkamies (Vandraren) - 3. Aamulaulu (Kun aamun aurinko - Morgonvisa) - 4. Vanha kehtolaulu (Gammal vaggvisa) - 5. Kukkuu, kukkuu - 6. Tyttö on kaunis kuin keväällä ruoho (Flickan är vacker som gräset om våren) - 7. Järven rannall' (På sjöstranden) - 8. Sydämein on tallella (Mitt hjärta är mitt) - 9. Kuu ei anna valoa (Månen lyser ej mer) - 10. Och jungfrun hon går i dansen (On neidolla punapaula) - 11. Sureva nuorukainen (Den sörjande ynglingen) - 12. Du är så vacker för mina ögon (Sa oot niin kaunis mun silmissäni) - 13. Iltalaulu (Aftonsång) - 14. Köyhä poika (Den fattige gossen) - 15. Sydämestäni rakastan (Av hela hjärtat älskar jag) - 16. Nytpä nähdään (Nu få vi se) - 17. Voi minua poika raukkaa (O, ve mig arma gosse) - 18. Voi äiti parka and raukka (O moder, arma moder) - 19. Där gingo två flickor i rosendelund (Kaks neitosta käveli puistossa) - 20. En voi sua unhoittaa (Jag kan dig aldrig glömma)
- Helmivyö II (String of pearls II), Op. 159b (1929) - Pärlbandet II
- 1. Suomen laulu (Suomis sång – Song of Finland) / Composer Fredrik Pacius - 2. Vanha kehtolaulu (Gammal vaggvisa) - 3. Aamulla (Om morgonen) - 4. Rannalla itkijä (Den gråtande på stranden) - 5. Häälaulu (Bröllopssång) - 6. Älä mene heikolle jäälle (Gå ej på svag is) - 7. Viheriäinen maa (Den gröna jorden) - 8. Kananmuna (Hönsägget) - 9. Aikoand entisiä (Svunna tider) - 10. Voi jos ilta joutuisi (Ack, om Kväll ren vore) - 11. Korkealla vuorella (På det höga berget) - 12. Kaunis ruusunnuppu (En vacker rosenknopp) - 13. Tytön posket punottaa (Flickans kinder rodna) - 14. Pappa se sanoi (Pappa han sade) - 15. Hengellinen kansanlaulu (Andlig folkvisa) - 16. Minun kultani kaunis on (Skön är min älskade) - 17. Kaiho (Vemod) - 18. Hyvää iltaa, lintusein (God afton, fågeln min) - 19. Sinulle, ystäväiseni (Till dig, min lilla vän) - 20. Viherjäisen niityn poikki (Över den gröna ängen)
- Barnens vecka (Children's week), Op. 163 (1931?) - Sju lätta stycken för piano – 7 småstycker för piano
  1. Barnen leka - Söndag
  2. Arbetet börjar - Måndag
  3. Duett - Tisdag
  4. Den fattige gossens visa - Onsdag
  5. Motorn - Torsdag
  6. Vemod - Fredag
  7. Arbetet är gjort - Lördag
- Legenda IV, Op. 174 (1896?, unpublished)
- Variationeja (Variations), Op. 177 (1930s?, unpublished) – based on the theme of opus 2
- Sonatina III, Op. 181, A major (1896?/1930s, unpublished) - Sonaatti vanhaan tyyliin
- Seppä and liekki (Blacksmith and the flame), Op. 183 (1935)
- A rivederla! , EM001 (1904) - Piano (or string orchestra)
- Aamuvirsi (Morning hymn), EM002 (1916) – Uusi aamu
- Albumblad, EM009 (1900?, published 1900) - Andante, E minor
- Allegro energico, EM012 (?)
- Andante espresso, EM016 (1897)
- Andantino, EM017 (1906 or earlier, published 1906)
- Andantino, EM018 (?) A minor
- Arosävelmä (Melody from the steppes), EM019 (1906 or earlier, published 1906)
- Aubade, EM20 (1901)
- Ballade, EM023 (1896)
- Barcarolle, EM024 (1895) - Gute Morgen
- Berceuse, EM025 (1897)
- Bourré, EM029 (1906 or earlier, published 1906)
- Duetto, EM037 (1890-luku?)
- Espanjalainen laulu (Spanish song), EM041 (1906 or earlier, published 1906) - Spanska visa
- Ferne!, EM045 (1905)
- Festmarsch åt far och mor, EM048 (1901) – Födelsedagsmarsch
- Frühlingsliedchen, EM051 (1895) - Es war zur goldnen Frühlingszeit
- Födelsedagsmarsch, EM054 (1920)
- Couplet, EM065 (1923) - Smaa-bitte Ting
- Ett hjärtas vaggsång, EM067 (1914)
- Ilta Italiassa (Night in Italy), EM076 (1906 or earlier, published 1906)
- Intermezzo, EM082 (1911/1915)
- Intermezzo, EM083A (1895)
- Intermezzo, EM083B (1895)
- Intermezzo, EM084 (?)
- Intrata, EM086 (1904)
- Joulutunnelma (Christmas mood), EM093 (?)
- Juhlakulkue (Parade), EM096 (1906 or earlier, published 1906)
- Jänis (A hare), EM098 (1906 or earlier, published 1906)
- Kihlaus (Betrothal), EM112 (1898) – sketch
- Kiinalainen surumarssi (Chinese funeral march), EM113 (1906?)
- Kotipihlajan laulu (Song of the rowan tree back home), EM116 (1906?)
- Kuutamossa (Moonlight), EM123 (?)
- Laulu hämärässä (Song in dusk), EM131 (?, lost)
- Lied, EM134 (1892)
- En liten morgonvisa (A small morning song), EM138 (1915)
- En liten romansunge (A small romance), EM139 (18.8.1917) - Liten romans
- Maailma suuri (World is so big), EM146 (1929?) - Jorden så stor – Världen den stora
- Menuetto, EM159 (1906 or earlier, published 1906) C major
- Metsämajani (My cottage in the woods), EM160 (1903?)
- Nyt on mun mielestäni (I think, now is the time), EM174 (1901 or earlier, published 1901)
- Prélude, D♭ major, EM191 (?)
- Preludium, E major, EM192 (1896)
- Prélude, F major, EM193 (1912)
- Prélude No. 4 E minor, EM194 (1892)
- Präludium & Fuga, D minor, EM195 (1896)
- Pääskysen hyvästijättö (Swallow's goodbye), EM200 (1906 or earlier, published 1906)
- En sjöman älskar havets våg (A sailor loves the waves), EM216 (1929?) - Merimies kanssa aaltojen
- Skämt (A joke), EM217 (?)
- Slädfärd (Sledging), EM218 (?)
- Suite I, EM221 (1892-1893, unfinished)
- 1. Prélude - 2. Courante - 3. Sarabande - 4. Gavotte - 5. Musette - 6. Menuet
- Suomalainen tanssi (Finnish dance), EM222 (1894)
- Suvilaulu (Summer song), EM225 (1927?, published 1928) - Vårvisa - Frühlingsweise
- Taivahan ääriin lauluni soikoon (My song shall ring to the heaven), EM228 (1929?) - Klinge min sång till himlarnas höjd
- Talvi-ilta (Winter evening), EM229 (1927?, published 1928) - Vinterafton - Winterabend
- Tranquillo, EM235 (1898) Piano for four hands
- Tulitanssi (Fire dance), EM237 (1920s?)
- Vaggvisa (Lullaby), EM248 (?)
- Variatsiooneja (Variations), EM249 (1906 or earlier, published 1906)
- Venelaulu (Boat song), EM250 (1898)
- Vindens visa (Song of the wind), EM252 (1918)
- Voi, jos ilta joutuisi (If only the evening should come), EM254 (1901 or earlier, published 1901)
- Väsyneen lapsen kehtolaulu (Lullaby for the tired child), EM257 (1927?, published 1927) - Vaggsång för ett trött barn - Wiegenlied für ein müdes Kind
- Wie schön leuchtet der Morgenstern, EM258 (?)
- Aamulla (In the morning), EM271 (1932) – Works between EM271-585 are mostly incomplete and survive as sketches only
- Abend, EM272 (1910)
- Afsked, EM273 (1893) - Avsked
- Aftonpsalm, EM274 (1917 / 1922)
- Agitato, EM275 (1897)
- Agitato, EM276 (1925)
- Aino, EM278 (1897)
- Alkulaulu (Starting song), EM279 (1927)
- Alla italiana, EM280 (1915)
- Alla polacca, EM281 (1894)
- Alla polacca, EM282 (1895)
- Allegretto, EM283 (1914)
- Allegretto, EM283 (1932)
- Allegretto simplice, EM283 (1893)
- Allegro energico, EM286 (1929)
- Allegro risoluto, EM289 (1898?)
- Andante, EM291 (1896?)
- Andante, EM292 (1926) - Sorgmusiken för Erik Moltesen
- Andante, EM293 (1928)
- Andante, EM294 (1931)
- Andante, EM295 (1934)
- Andante cantabile, EM296 (?)
- Andantino agitato, EM297B (1912)
- Anekdot, EM298 (1932, published 1912) - Bagateller – 10 lätta stycken för piano
- Arietta, EM300 (1899) - Madrigale
- Bachanal, EM301A (1895)
- Bagatell, EM301B (1913)
- Balettscenen, EM302 (1902)
- Ballade, EM303A, b-molli (1893)
- Ballade, EM303B (1894)
- Ballade, EM305 (1897)
- Ballett, EM307A (1897)
- Ballettscen, EM307B (1895)
- Barcarole, EM309 (1894)
- Barcarole, EM310 (1902)
- Bathseba, EM311 (1902)
- Berceuse, EM312 (1897)
- Berceuse, EM313 (1897)
- Berceuse, EM314, G major (1897)
- Berceuse, EM315 (1910)
- Berceuse, EM316 (1917)
- Berceuse, EM317 (1924)
- Canzonetta, EM320 (1897)
- Canzonetta al'antique, EM321 (1897)
- Capriccio, EM322 (1895)
- Chanson, EM323 (1900)
- Chanson Farväl, EM324A (1919)
- Consolation, EM324B (1891) – Melartin's first completed composition
- Crescendo, EM325 (1890-luku)
- Dockornas marsch (March of the puppets), EM327B (1894) - Kinderstück
- Einige Blätter, EM329A (?)
- Ej för fort (Not too quickly), EM329B (1895)
- Eroico, EM330 (1901)
- Etude, EM331 (1898)
- Etude, EM332 (1903)
- Etude, EM333 (1904)
- Festmarsch, EM335 (1898)
- Festpolonäs, EM336 (1910-luku)
- Fosterländsk melodi (Patriotic melody), EM338 (1909?)
- 8 fuugaa (8 fugues), EM341 (1890-luku) – Fuga à 3 voci – Fuga à 4 voci – In modo mixolidico
- Fuga 3 voix, EM342 (1893)
- Fugato, EM343B (1893)
- Gammaldags (Like in old days), EM345 (1914)
- Gammalvisan (Song of the old days), EM346 (1902)
- Gavotte, EM347 (1895)
- Gavotte, EM348 (1898)
- Gavotte, EM349, G major (1900)
- Gavotte all'antique, EM350 (1896)
- Gigue, EM351, e-molli (1908)
- Greven og Kongedotteren (Count and the princess), EM352 (1890-luku?)
- Guldbröllpsdans (Golden wedding dance), EM354 (1920)
- Guldbröllpsmenuett (Golden wedding minuet), EM355 (1920)
- Gunghästen (Rocking horse), EM356 (1932 or earlier, published 1932) - Bagateller – 10 lätta stycken för piano
- Habanera, EM357 (1920)
- Heilaani menen minä katsomaan (Going to see my girl), EM360 (?)
- Heilani meni, EM361 (My girl has gone) (1917)
- Heilani posket on punaiset (My girl has red cheeks), EM362 (1917)
- En helsning (Greeting), EM363 (1900)
- Hemlängtan till södern (Yearning for South), EM364 (1919)
- Humoresk, EM365 (1898)
- Humoresk, EM366 (1912)
- Humoresk, EM368, G major (1932 or earlier, published 1932) - Bagateller – 10 lätta stycken för piano
- Hääsoitto (Wedding music), EM370 (1920) – Bröllopsmusik
- I båten (In the boat), EM373 (1932 or earlier, published 1932) – Bagateller – 10 lätta stycken för piano
- Idylle, EM374 (1918)
- Idylle i Italien, EM375 (1890s?)
- Impressions, EM378 (1914)
- Impromptu, EM379 (1894)
- Impromptu, EM380 (1899)
- Impromptu, EM381 (1902)
- In the hour of death, EM382 (1912)
- Intermezzo, EM385 (1904) – Idyll
- Intermezzo, EM386 (1908) - Capriccio
- Intermezzo, EM387 (1925)
- Intermezzo, EM388 (1928)
- Intermezzo II, EM390 (1892)
- Intiaanitanssi (Indian dance), EM392 (1929)
- Jeesus siunaa (Jesus is blessing), EM394 (1927?)
- Joululaulu (Christmas song), EM397 (?) - Julsång
- Joutsen (A swan), EM399 (1898) – Au crépuscule
- Julmorgon (Christmas morning), EM400 (1932 or earlier, published 1932) – Bagateller – 10 lätta stycken för piano
- Järven, järven, järven jäällä (On the frozen lake), EM401 (1917)
- Kansanlaulu (Folk song), EM405 (?)
- Kansansävel (Folk melody), EM406 (?)
- Kehtolaulu (Lullaby), EM408 (1908)
- Kinderstück, EM409 (1890s?)
- Kinderstücken, EM410 (1896)
- Kiputytön laulu (A girl in pains singing), EM411 (1898 or later)
- Kleine Etüde, EM412 (1903-1912)
- Klunkom Welam Welamsson, EM413A (1898?)
- Kuusi on metsän kuningas (Spruce is the King of the Forest), EM418 (1917)
- Largo, EM421 (1898)
- Largo, EM422 (1913)
- Lento, EM426 (1894)
- Lento, EM427 (1916)
- Lento all' Händel, EM429 (1896)
- Lied, EM433 (1903)
- Lied, EM434 (1907) - Preludium
- Lied, EM435 (1912)
- Lied, EM436 (1915) – Chanson
- Den lilla sjöjungfrun (The little mermaid), EM437 (1909?, lost)
- Ländler, EM442 (1911)
- Mantra, EM443 (1920s) - Part of the Finnish Rosicrucian ritual music (EM518)
- Marcia funèbre, EM444 (1898)
- Maria Stuart Skotlannissa (Maria Stuart in Scotland), EM445 (1930?)
- Marsch, EM446 (1929)
- Marssi, EM447 (?)
- Marsch, EM448 (?)
- Marssi, EM449 (1908)
- Med en blåklocka (With a bellflower), EM450 (1932 or earlier, published 1932) - Bagateller – Blåklocka – 10 lätta stycken för piano
- Melodie, EM451 (1890s)
- Melodie, EM452 (1900) - Grabgesang
- Menuetto, EM453 (1896)
- Menuetto, EM454 (1900)
- Menuetto, EM455 (1929)
- Menuetto, EM456, B major (?)
- Menuetto, EM457, A minor (?)
- Menuetto al antique, EM459A (1896)
- Menuetto lento, EM459B (1927)
- Metsä (Forest), EM459C (1910) - Skogen
- Metsämaja (Cottage in the woods), EM460 (?)
- Miekkatanssi (Sword dance), EM461 (1926)
- Mietiskely (Meditation), EM462 (1920s?) - Part of the Finnish Rosicrucian ritual music (EM518)
- Miniatures, EM465 (1897)
- Minuee, EM466 (?) – Menuett i finsk folkstil – Menuett im finnischen Volkstyle
- Moderato affettuoso, EM467B (1894)
- Morgonbön, EM469 (1915)
- Morgonljus vid kusten (Morning light on the seashore), EM470 (?)
- Notturno, EM474 (1901)
- Pastorale, EM484 (1896)
- Pastorale, EM485 (1896)
- Pastorale, EM488 (1930)
- Petit valse, EM489 (1898)
- Petite valse, EM490 (1921)
- Petsamo, EM491 (1920-luku?)
- Pianokappale (A piano piece), EM492, G major (1899)
- Piccolo minuetto, EM494 (1924)
- Pienet merihevoset (Small sea horses), EM495 (1929)
- Pieni marssi (Small march), EM496 (1926)
- Prélude, EM498, G♭ minor (1892)
- Prelude, EM499A (1912)
- Prelude, EM499B (1912)
- Prélude, EM500 (1912)
- Prelude, EM501 (1912)
- Prélude, EM502A (1913)
- Prélude, EM502B (1913)
- Prelude, EM503 (1919)
- Prélude nocturne, EM504 (1916)
- Presto, EM505 (1897)
- Prinsessen, EM506 (1896)
- Prinsesspolka, EM507 (1930-luku?)
- Prinssin tanssi (Prince's dance), EM508 (1929)
- Rannalla (On the shore), EM513 (?)
- Romance, EM519A (1894)
- Romans, EM519B (1909)
- Saksalainen laulu (German song), EM520 (?) - Tysk visa
- Scene Orientale, EM522 (1894)
- Scherzo, EM523, A major (1892)
- Scherzo, EM524, A major (1890-luku?)
- Scherzo, EM525 (1903)
- Scherzo, EM526 (1916)
- Scherzo, EM527 (1917)
- Die Silberprinzessin, EM532 (?)
- Sinivuokolle (To a liverwort), EM534 (1927)
- Den sista gången (For the last time), EM535 (1898)
- Den sista vaggvisan (The last lullaby), EM536 (1927)
- Skogsstämning (Forest mood), EM537 (1893)
- Slädfärd (Sleigh ride), EM538 (1932 or earlier, published 1932) - Bagateller – 10 lätta stycken för piano
- Snöfall (Snowing), EM539 (1932 or earlier, published 1932) - Bagateller – 10 lätta stycken för piano
- Soluppgång (Sunrise), EM540 (1900) - urut
- Som stjärnan uppå himmelen (Like a star in the sky), EM541 (1930 or earlier)
- Sonat, EM543 (1896)
- Sonatine, EM545, B major (1892)
- Sonatine, EM546, E major (?)
- Sonatine, EM547, G major (?)
- Stilla stund (A quiet moment), EM548 (1932 or earlier, published 1932) - Bagateller – 10 lätta stycken för piano
- Sua kiitän (I thank you), EM549 (1932)
- Suvivirsi (Summer hymn), EM553 (1930s?) – Sommarpsalm
- Tema semplia, EM555 (1900)
- Tillegnad, EM558 (1911)
- To Uger (Two weeks), EM559 (1928?) - Kaksi viikkoa – 14 smaa Klaverstykker for Børn
  1. Søndagstur - Söndagspromenad – Sunnuntaikävely
  2. Børnene gaar til skole - Lapset juoksevat kouluun
  3. Duet - Duetto
  4. Influenza - Influenssa
  5. Støj - Springlek – Hälinää
  6. Den fattige Drengs Vise - Den fattige gossens visa – Köyhän pojan laulu
  7. Afteno - Aftono – Iltarauha
  8. Morgensalme - Morgonpsalm – Aamuvirsi
  9. Arbejdet begynder - Työ alkaa
  10. Sang om Lapland - Visan om Lappland – Laulu Lapista
  11. Den moderløse Pige synger - Den moderlösa flickan sjunger – Äidittömän tytön laulu
  12. Motorn - Motoren – Moottori
  13. Vemod - Surumieli
  14. Arbejdet er gjort - Arbetet är gjort – Työ on tehty
- Traum durch die Dämmerung, EM560A (1906 or earlier, lost)
- Trio, EM560B (1908)
- Työlaulu (Working song), EM562 (1916)
- Under mandelträdet på Pincio (Under an almond tree on Pincio), EM565A (1900)
- Ungersk dans (Hungarian dance), EM565B (1893, lost)
- Vaggvisa (Lullaby), EM566 (1904)
- Valon poika (Son of Light), EM567 (?)
- Valse, EM568 (1925)
- Vandrare (Wanderer), EM569 (1898)
- Vid en källa, EM572 (1932 or earlier, published 1932) - Bagateller – 10 lätta stycken för piano
- Visa (A song), EM574 (1893)
- Die Wallfahrt der Binsgauer, EM577 (1890-luku)
- Der Zufriedene, EM580 (1901)
- Åkallan (Invocation), EM581 (1917)
- Österlandet (Orient), EM583 (1897)
- Österlandet (Orient), EM584 (?)
- 10 pianokappaletta (Ten piano pieces), EM585 (1898?)

== Works for piano four hands ==
- Marionnettes, Op. 1 (1897) - Suite pour le piano à 4 mains - Piano for four hands
  1. Entrée des Marionnettes
  2. Pas des deux
  3. Sérénade
  4. Capriccio
  5. Duo Amoureux
  6. Cortège et Sortie des Marionnettes
- Festmarsch, EM047 (1898)
- Intermezzo, EM085 (1894)
- Intermezzo umoristico, EM391 (1897)
- Pastorale, EM486 (?)
- Suite mignon, EM550 (1897)

== Works for 2 pianos ==
- Fantasie für 2 Clavire, EM044 (1901)

== Works for organ ==
- Festliches Präludium, EM046 (1931?, published 1955 and 1984)
- Fuga, EM340 (1920)
- Fugato, EM343A (?)
- Intermezzo, EM384 (1890s)
- Organo, EM479 (1933)

== Concertos ==
- Concerto for violin and orchestra, Op. 60, D minor (1910-1913/1930, unpublished, recorded)
- Scéne dansante, EM210 (1930-luku?, unpublished, recorded) – Violoncello and chamber orchestra
- Pianokonserten (Piano concerto), EM493 (1901-1933) – Just fragments exist

== Composition for a string instrument and piano ==
All for violin and piano, unless otherwise stated.

- Viulusonaatti No. 1 (Violin sonata), Op. 10, E major (1899)
- Elegie, Op. 44, No. 1 (30.7.1907) – Violin or violoncello and piano
- Cantilene, Op. 44, No. 2 (6.11.1907) - Violin or violoncello and piano
- Canzone, Op. 44, No. 3 (1908)
- Berceuse, Op. 44, No. 4 (1901?)
- Romance, Op. 44, No. 5, F major (1901?)
- Nocturne, Op. 64, F major (1910)
- Viulusonaatti No. 2 (Violon sonata 2), Op. 74, D♭ minor (1897/1933, unpublished, unfinished)
- 7 pientä kappaletta (7 small pieces), Op. 82 (1914-1915?) - 7 små stycken - 7 pièces pour violon et piano
  1. Aamurukous - Morgonbön - Prière de matin - Morgen
  2. Yksin - Ensam - Solitude - Einsam
  3. Leikinlasku - Humoresk - Humoresque - Humoreske
  4. Kehtolaulu - Vaggvisa - Berceuse - Wiegenlied
  5. Ländler
  6. Tervehdys - Hälsning - Dédicace - Gruss
  7. Menuetto, G major
- 5 pièces faciles, Op. 94 (1915-1916)
  1. Intrada (unpublished)
  2. Arioso (lost or never composed)
  3. Piccola Gavotta (1916, published)
  4. Canzona (lost or never composed)
  5. Rondino (lost or never composed)
- Sex lätta stycken, Op. 121 (1924) - 6 helppoa kappaletta - 6 enkla stycken - Six Easy Pieces – Three different versions of each exist: violoncello and piano, violin and piano and violin, violoncello and piano
  1. Canto religioso
  2. Menuetto
  3. Berceuse
  4. Nocturne
  5. Serenata
  6. Mattinata
- Andante, EM015, A minor (1933)
- Berceuse, EM026, A major (1901? published 1901)
- Chanson, EM031 (1895)
- Concertino, EM032 (1923)
- Fantasia, EM043 (1897?) - Ballade – Fantasie
- Intermezzo, EM081 (1912, published 1993)
- Meditatio, EM154 (1929) – Violin and piano, violoncello ad. lib.
- Melodi, EM158 (1896?)
- Allegro maestoso, EM288 (1896)
- Lento, EM428 (1923)
- Notturno, EM475 (1924) – Violoncello and piano
- Sonat för piano och violoncello (Sonata for piano and violoncello), EM544 (1913) – Violoncello and piano
- Violinsonat (Sonata for violin), EM573, E major (1893) – sketches only

== Compositions for a string quartet ==
- Jousikvartetto No. 1 (String quartet No. 1), Op. 36, No. 1, E minor (1896, unpublished)
- Jousikvartetto No. 2 (String quartet No. 2), Op. 36, No. 2, G minor (1898-1900, unpublished)
- Jousikvartetto No. 3 (String quartet No. 3), Op. 36, No. 3, Es major (1902, unpublished)
- Jousikvartetto No. 4 (String quartet No. 4), Op. 62, F major (1908-1910, unpublished)
- Fuga, EM051, A major (?)
- Fuuga, EM053, G minor (?)
- Intermezzo, EM383 (1896)
- Stråkqvartett c-moll (String quartet C minor), EM398 (1898) – unfinished, material used in Symphony No. 1

== Other chamber music ==
- Jousitrio (String trio), Op. 133 (1926) – Violin, viola and violoncello
- Sonata per flauto ed arpa, Op. 135b (5.3.1931) – Flute and harp (arrangement of Op. 135a with an added Andante) – arrangement for flute and guitar by Timo Hongisto published
- Puhallinkvartetto (Brass quartet), Op. 153 (1929, unpublished) – 2 trumpets, horn and trombone
- Puhallintrio (Woodwind trio), Op. 154 (1929, unpublished) – Flute, clarinet and bassoon
- Pieni kvartetti neljälle cornille (A small quartet for four horns), Op. 185 (1936, unpublished, recorded) – 4 horns
- Kappale harpulle and huilulle (A piece for harp and flute), Op. 187 (1930s?, unpublished, lost)
- Meditatio, EM154 (1930s) - Violin, violoncello and piano
- Pianokvintetto (Piano quintet), EM186 (1897-1899) – 2 violins, viola, violoncello and piano
- Pianotrio, e-molli (Piano trio E minor), EM187 (1895-1896) - Violin, violoncello and piano
- Canon, EM318 (1907) - Violin, violoncello and piano
- Kammarsymfoni, EM403 (1923) – String quartet, flute, oboe, clarinet, bassoon and horn (only piano sketches exist)
- Musik für vier Instrumente, EM472 (1932) – Flute, violin, clarinet and violincello
- Pastorale, EM487 (1902) – Flute and piano
- Punapaula, EM509 (1920-luku?) - 2 trumpets, horn and trombone

== Other musical works ==
- Neljä fuugaa (Four fugues), Op. 189 (1936?, unpublished) – possibly for string quartet or string orchestra
- Aavistelija (Foresee), EM004 (1931, lost) – Melartin's suggestion for the break signal of the Finnish Broadcasting Company
- Pieniä kappaleita kanteleella (Small pieces with kantele), EM189 (1935)
  1. Kalevalainen laulu (Song from Kalevala)
  2. Häälaulu (Wedding song)
  3. Tyttö rannalla (Girl on the shore)
  4. Yksin (Alone)
  5. Rannalla itkijä (Crying on the shore)
  6. Lyydinen sarja (Lydic suite)
- Allegro, EM286 (1894) - Instrumental voice
- Andante pastorale, EM297A (1930) - Instrumental voice
- Barbarentanz, EM308 (1914) - Instrumental voice
- Canto funebre, EM319 (?) – Instrumental voice (basso)
- Gammal melodi, EM344 (?) – Instrumental voice and piano
- Humoresk, EM367 (1915) – Instrumental voice and piano
- Kontrapunkt, EM415A (?) – 40 pages of MS sketches for unspecified voices
- Kun illoin rukoilevat (Praying in the evening), EM417 (1927) - Instrumental voice
- Lumikorpien yö (Night in the snowy forest), EM440B (?) - Instrumental voice
- Menuetto all'antico, EM458 (1913) - Instrumental voice
- Muurahaiset (The ants), EM473 (?) - Instrumental voice
- På bryggan (On the bride), EM510 (1914) - Instrumental voice
- Tunnelma (Mood), EM561 (1931) – Instrumental voice

== Arrangements of works by other composers ==
Arrangements are listed here by the original composer. The several arrangements Melartin did of traditional and anonymous works are in the main list.

- Johann Sebastian Bach
  - Ich halte treulich still, Op. 157, No. 1 (for piano. 1924) – BWV 466 of Die geistlichen Lieder und Arien (BWV 439-507)
  - Am Abend, Op. 157, No. 2 (for piano. 1924) – BWV 448 of Die geistlichen Lieder und Arien (BWV 439-507)
  - Freuet euch, ihr Christen alle, Op. 157, No. 3 (for piano. 1924) – Finale chorus from BWV 40 Darzu ist erschienen der Sohn Gottes
  - Präludium, Op. 157, No. 4 (for piano. 1918) – The last prelude from Sonaten und Partiten, BWV1001-1006
- Leonhard Emil Bach
  - Kein Hälmlein wächst auf Erden (for piano. 1924, unpublished)
- Carl Michael Bellman
  - Solen glimmar blank och trind, FE 48 (for mixed choir, in Finnish Kevätlaulu, unpublished)
- Ole Bull
  - Sæterjentens søndag (for tenor and orchestra, unpublished) - Paimentytön sunnuntai
- Enrico De Leva
  - Passero sperduto (voice and violin 1905 in Finnish by Jalmari Hahl, Eksynyt varpunen, unpublished)
- Henri Desmarets & Co.
  - Pièces classiques, Op. 158 (for violin and piano. 1919 or earlier, published 1919)
    1. Passacaille – Charles-Hubert Gervais (Hypermnestre 1716)
    2. Gavotte en Rondeau - Jean-Baptiste Lully (Ballet de la Raillerie, LWV11, 1659)
    3. Tricotets – Louis Joseph Saint-Amans (Ninette à la Cour 1791)
    4. Menuet - Jean-Jacques Rousseau (Le Devin du Village 1748)
    5. Tamburin - André Ernest Modeste Grétry (Aspasie 1789)
    6. Sarabande et Passepied - André Cardinal Destouches (Issé 1693)
    7. Bourrée – Jean-Joseph Mouret (Les Amours de Ragonde 1742)
    8. Pavane et Gavotte - Jean-Baptiste Lully (La Noce de Village, LWV19, 1680 & Ballet de l'amour malade, LWV8, 1657)
    9. Rigaudons – Henri Desmarets (Circé 1694)
    10. Gigue - André Ernest Modeste Grétry (Denys le tyran 1794)
- Richard Faltin
  - I lifvets kamp (for piano. 1901, published 1901)
- Giovanni Giacomo Gastoldi
  - Il bell' umore (for piano. 1908, unpublished)
- Emil Genetz
  - Ii-ii (for piano. 1901 or earlier, published 1901)
  - Karjala (for piano. 1901 or earlier, published 1901)
- Kreeta Haapasalo
  - Kanteleeni (My kantele) (voice and piano. 1906?, published 1906)
- August Halm
  - Tempo di minuetto (for violin, viola or second violin and violoncello, unpublished)
- George Frideric Handel
  - O theure Gattin (for voice and string orchestra, from Amadigi di Gaula, HWV 11, unpublished)
- Armas Järnefelt
  - Onnelliset (The happy ones) (for piano. 1901 or earlier, published 1901)
  - Sirkka (for piano. 1901 or earlier, published 1901)
- Heino Kaski
  - Lähdettyäs (When you've gone), Op. 26, No. 3 (voice and chamber orchestra, unpublished)
- Toivo Kuula
  - Aamulaulu (Morning song), Op. 2, No. 3 (for piano. 1928, published 1928)
  - Taikapeili (The magic mirror), Op. 30c. No 4, Metsä-Matti soittaa (for piano. 1928, published 1928)
- Oskar Merikanto
  - Kevätlinnuille etelässä (To the spring birds now in south), Op. 11, No. 1 (for piano. 1928, published 1928)
  - Kottarainen (Starling), Op. 36, No. 2 (for piano. 1928, published 1928)
  - Lohdutus (Consolation), Op. 42, No. 2 (for piano. 1901 or earlier, published 1901)
  - Reppurin laulu (Backpacker's song), Op. 14, No. 10 (for voice and orchestra, 1930 or earlier, known only from recording)
  - Vallinkorvan laulu (Song of Vallinkorva), Op. 24, No. 2 (for tenor and orchestra, unpublished)
- Wolfgang Amadeus Mozart
  - Ave verum corpus, KV 618 (for string quartet, unpublished)
  - Piano concerto No. 15, KV 450, B major (cadence 1896, unpublished)
- Gustaf Nordqvist
  - Tala, älskade, tala (for voice and chamber orchestra, unpublished)
- Fredrik Pacius
  - Maamme / Vårt land (for piano. 1929, published in Helmivyö I, Op. 159a)
  - Suomis sång / Suomen laulu (for piano. 1929, published in Helmivyö II, Op. 159b)
- Bernardo Pasquini
  - Giran pure in ciel le sfere (for voice and orchestra, unpublished)
- K. Ranuszewicz
  - Menuetto all'antico (for violin and piano, unpublished)
- Franz Schubert
  - Trois Marches Héroiques, D602. No 1 (for orchestra, unpublished)
- Jean Sibelius
  - Sortunut ääni, Op. 18, No. 1 (for piano. 1901 or earlier, published 1901)
  - Terve kuu, Op. 18, No. 2 (for piano. 1901 or earlier, published 1901)
  - Venematka, Op. 18, No. 3 (for piano. 1901 or earlier, published 1901)
  - Saarella palaa, Op. 18, No. 4 (for piano. 1901 or earlier, published 1901)
  - Metsämiehen laulu, Op. 18, No. 5 (for piano. 1921 or earlier, published 1921)
  - Sydämeni laulu, Op. 18, No. 6 (for piano. 1921 or earlier, published 1921)
- Jāzeps Vītols
  - Piecas latviešu tautas dziesmas (for voice and piano, unpublished)
- Karl Wilhelm (conductor)
  - Die Wacht am Rhein (for piano. 1901 or earlier, published 1901)
- Rafael Öhberg
  - Kaksoisvirta (for mixed choir 1932, published 1932)

== Literature ==
- Poroila, Heikki: Erkki Melartinin teosluettelo - Erkki Melartin Werkverzeichnis - Erkki Melartin Work Catalog. Helsinki. Suomen musiikkikirjastoyhdistys. 2016.
- Poroila, Heikki: Erkki Melartinin teosluettelo 2.0 - Erkki Melartin Werkverzeichnis 2.0 - Erkki Melartin Work Catalog 2.0. Helsinki. Honkakirja. 2020. Updated PDF version
