= Christmas in Finland =

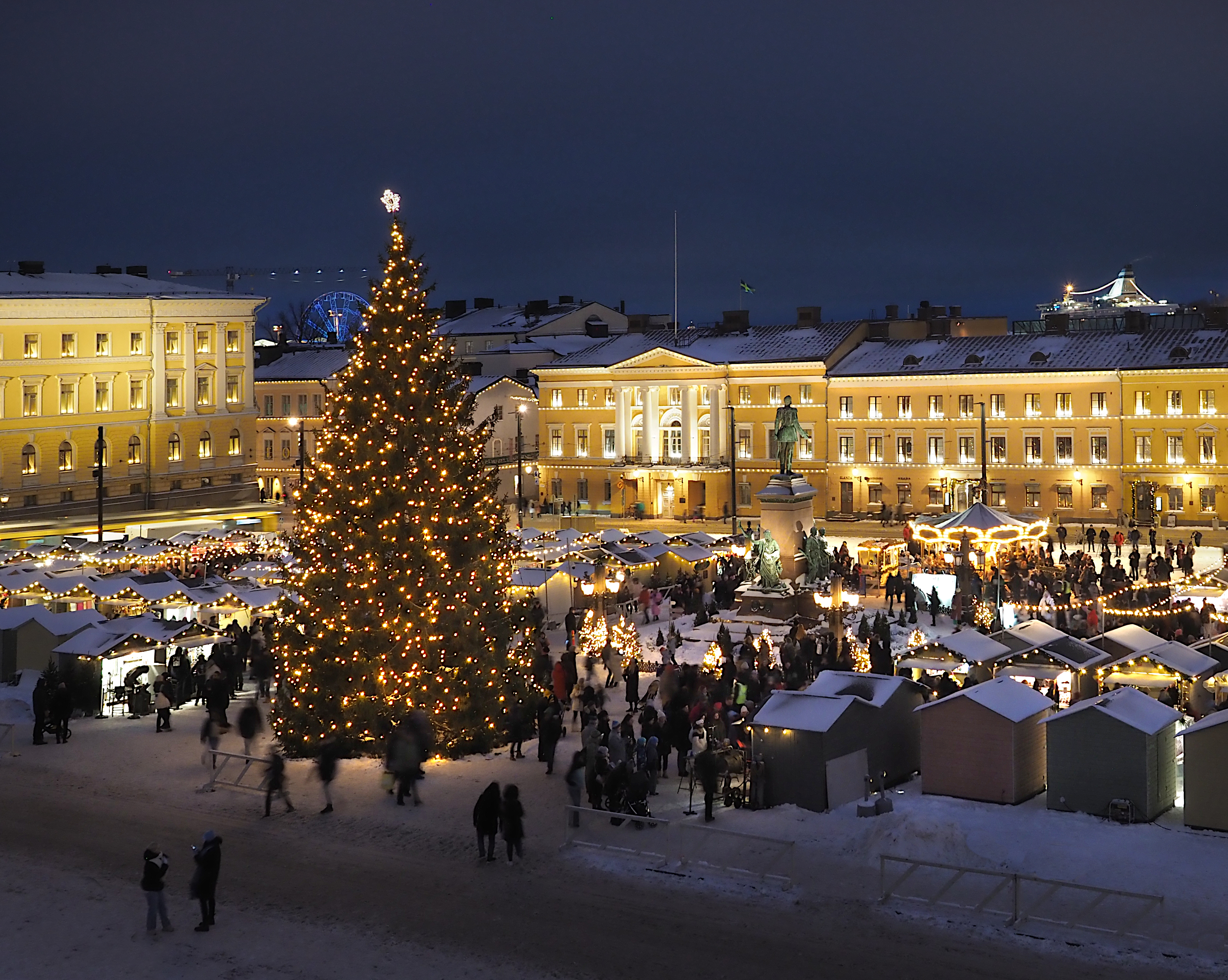
Helsinki Christmas Market

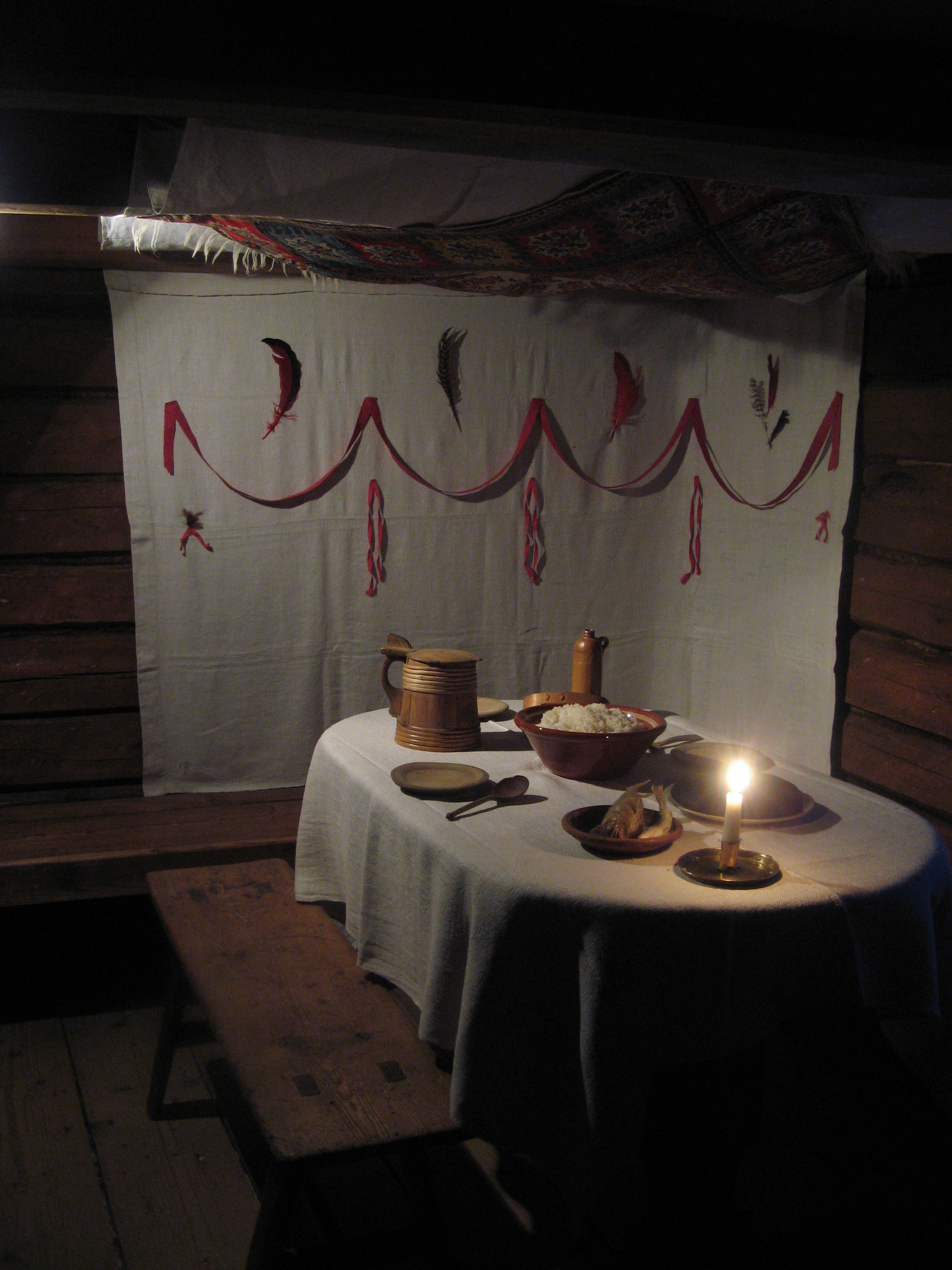
Yule table at an island at Luostarinmäki Crafts Museum, Christmas 2009

Christmas in Finland (Finnish: joulu; Swedish: jul) begins, as is commonplace on public holidays in Finland, on Christmas Eve (Finnish: jouluaatto; Swedish: julafton). Especially the evening of Christmas Eve has become the most important day of the Christmas period, and is nowadays a paid holiday in most workplaces. Unlike on other public holidays, public transportation stops almost completely on the afternoon of Christmas Eve in Finland. The Christmas period ends on Epiphany (Finnish: loppiainen; Swedish: trettondedagen).

In the BBC's 2023 article, Kinsey Gidick praises Finnish Christmas celebrations, especially the season of pikkujoulu ("Little Christmas"), which usually kicks off the Christmas festivities in Finland.

== History ==
In the Finnish tradition, the Christmas period has usually been considered to start on Tuomas's nameday on December 21 and to continue until St. Knut's Day on January 13. This is reflected in several rhymes and jingles, such as Hyvä Tuomas joulun tuopi, paha Nuutti pois sen viepi (“Good Tuomas the bringer, bad Nuutti the taker of Christmas”). Prior to 1774, Finland also celebrated a third Christmas Day, the day of apostle John the Evangelist on December 27, and a fourth Christmas Day, Massacre of the Innocents on December 28. However, King Gustav III of Sweden cut them down to two, because the nobility and bourgeoisie believed that long holidays made the workers too lazy. The third and fourth Christmas Day have also been called little holidays or midweek holidays. The Finnish Orthodox Church spends Christmas at the same time as the Western Christianity.

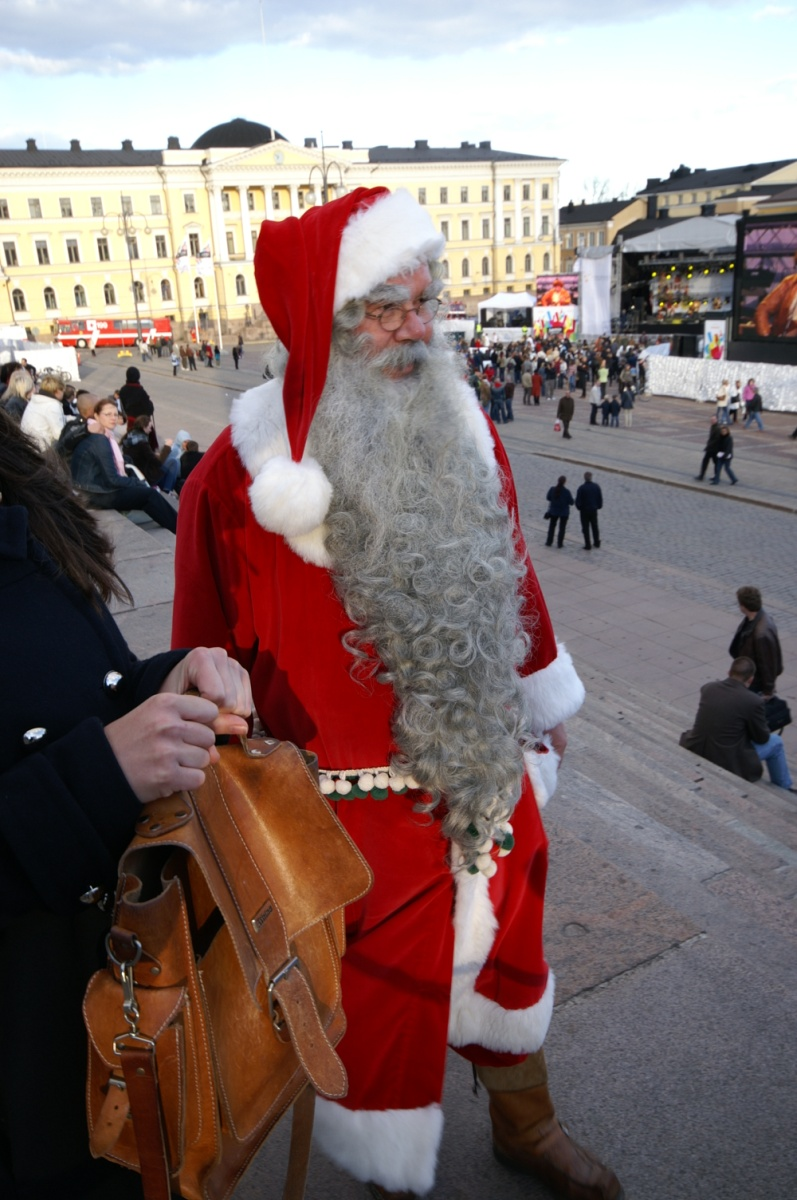
A Finnish Father Christmas

The Finnish Christmas has acquired some characteristics from the harvest festival kekri, that used to take place around the old All Saints' Day. In Sweden, Estonia and Finland, joulupukki (Christmas goat) was a man who dressed as a fertility rite character, a goat. He put goat horns on his head as in shamanistic tradition to look like a goat. The outfit also included a mask made of birch bark and a sheepskin coat worn inside-out.

Feeding small birds at Christmas is an old tradition and the peasant culture's ritual that brought good luck to farming. The purpose of the barley or oat sheaf was to keep the birds away from the crop in the summer. The Finnish pagans may have believed that the dead, i.e. soul birds, celebrated the mid-winter holiday with the living. They may have also believed birds to bring good luck to the home. In Sweden, the church was against this tradition, and it was about to disappear in Finland too, until some newspapers and charitable organisations revived it.

Some traditional Christmas decorations are himmeli (a hanging decoration made of straw) and Yule Goat. Decorations made of straw have their source in kekri, the harvest festival. The first Christmas trees came to Finland in the middle of the 1800s.

Early-morning Christmas church on Christmas Day morning is part of the Protestant tradition. The Christmas gospel is heard and Luther's hymn 21 Enkeli taivaan (Vom Himmel hoch, da komm ich her) is sung. Previously the Lutheran church was very strict about attending the Christmas church. If you did not attend, you were reprimanded publicly in the annual catechetical meeting. Reading the Christmas gospel before the meal became common at the end of the 1800s as a consequence of the Christian revival.

Having a sauna at Christmas is an old tradition. People washed in the Christmas sauna before the festivities, and food and drink gifts were left there for the elf. People in wealthy families started giving each other presents at the beginning of the 1800s. Christmas calendars arrived in Finland after the second world war.

The tradition to visit cemeteries to light candles on family graves was started in the 1900s. It became a common practice at the graves of fallen soldiers after the Winter War and soon at other graves too. The Kekri tradition of leaving presents for the dead was moved to Christmas. Nowadays candles may be lighted as a common experience to honor the dead.

Eating abundantly at the Christmas meal comes from the ancient Finns and relates to the agricultural year cycle and the festival of light celebrated around the winter solstice. At a time when food was grown at home, gluttony and eating meat at Christmas was a rare luxury. Lutefisk and porridge are some of the oldest Christmas foods. Barley was replaced by rice in the 1800s. Casseroles, prune soup and gingerbread biscuits were adopted from the upper classes in the 1800s and 1900s. The Christmas ham replaced the kekri lamb, and in the 1940s it was challenged by the wild turkey.

Christmas has traditionally been a family celebration in Finland, but in the 2000s, it had become quite common to spend Christmas alone. The Posti Group have been publishing Christmas stamps in Finland since 1973.

== Celebrating Christmas ==
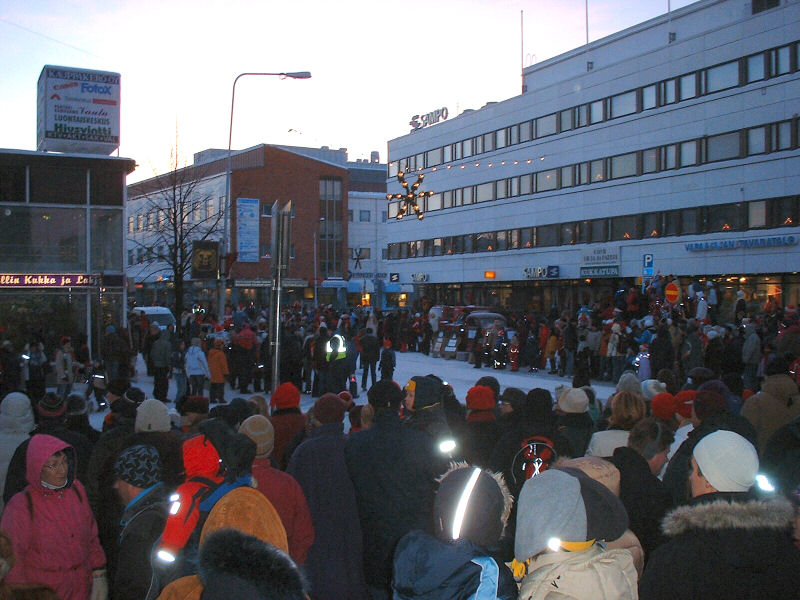
People celebrate Christmas in Rovaniemi, Lapland, Finland in 2004.

The usual Christmas decorations are spruce twigs, Christmas tree, Christmas wreaths, straw goats, himmelis, apples, candles, Christmas tablecloths, Christmas flowers, outdoor torches, ice lanterns and sheafs.

To preserve nature, some people choose a tree in the garden or nearby forest to decorate for the birds, instead of buying a Christmas tree. The tree is decorated with fat balls. Before giving out the presents, some may light candles for the dead. It is commonplace to go in the sauna at Christmas.

The Finnish Christmas meal, Joulupöytä (literally “Yule Table”), normally features different casseroles made usually of carrot, swede (lanttulaatikko) or potato (sweetened potato casserole) and various fish, such as cold smoked salmon, gravlax and Coregonus lavaretus (graavisiika). On Christmas Eve people usually eat rice porridge.

== See also ==
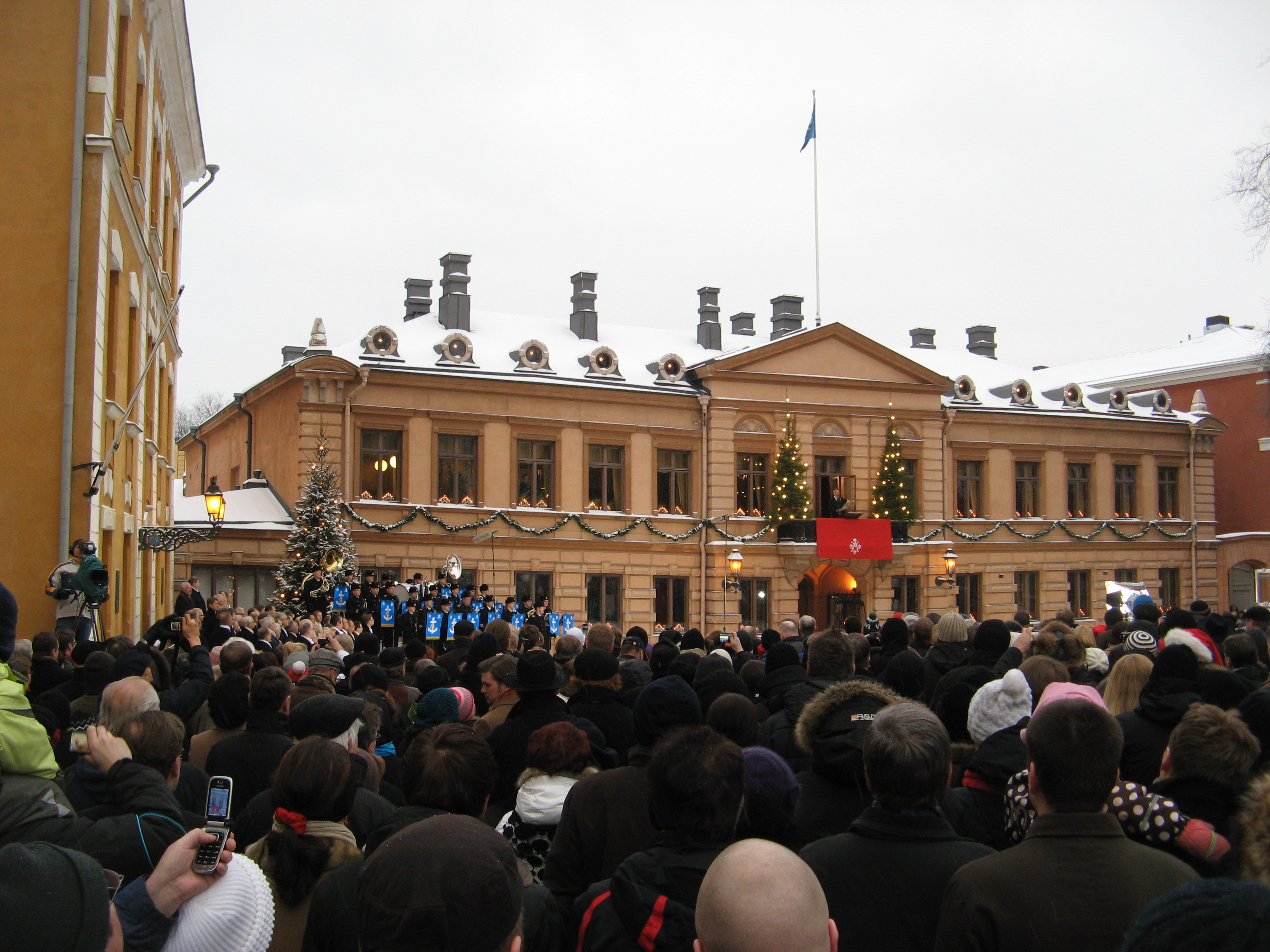
Christmas Peace is being declared on the Old Great Square of Turku.

- Christmas Eve
- Christmas Peace
- Finnish Yule Table
- Joulupukki (Father Christmas)
- Pikkujoulu (Little Christmas)
- Santa Claus and the Magic Drum
- Star singers
- Tuomaan Markkinat
- Santa Claus Village

== Sources ==
- Aurejärvi-Karjalainen, Anneli: Perheen omat juhlat: Siviiliseremoniat häistä hautajaisiin. Porvoo Helsinki Juva: WSOY, 1999. ISBN 951-0-23761-2.
- Vento, Urpo: Joulu, vuoden suurin juhla. Teoksessa Juhlakirja: Suomalaiset merkkipäivät, s. 196–202. Toimittanut Urpo Vento. Kalevalaseuran vuosikirja 59. Helsinki: Suomalaisen kirjallisuuden seura, 1979. ISBN 951-717-178-1.
