= Tuomas =

Tuomas is a male given name common in Finland. It is the Finnish version of the name Thomas. Common variations of Tuomas in Finland include Tuomo, Tomas and Thoma. The nameday is the 21st of December. As of 2013 there are more than 32,000 people with this name in Finland.

== Notable people ==
Some notable people who have this name include:

- Tuomas Aho, Finnish footballer
- Tuomas Anhava, Finnish writer
- Tuomas Bryggari (1881-1964), Finnish politician
- Tuomas Enbuske, Finnish radio and TV presenter and journalist
- Tuomas Erikoinen, Finnish creator of Jono (video game) and original artist for Angry Birds (video game)
- Tuomas Gerdt, Finnish Knight of the Mannerheim Cross
- Tuomas Grönman, retired ice hockey player
- Tuomas Haapala, Finnish footballer
- Tuomas Holopainen, Finnish musician
- Tuomas Hoppu, Finnish historian
- Tuomas Huhtanen, Finnish ice hockey left winger
- Tuomas W. Hyrskymurto, Finnish merchant and communist
- Tuomas Kansikas, Finnish footballer
- Tuomas Kantelinen, Finnish composer
- Tuomas Ketola, Finnish former tennis player
- Tuomas Kiiskinen, Finnish ice hockey player
- Tuomas Kuparinen, Finnish football player
- Tuomas Kyrö, Finnish author and cartoonist
- Tuomas Kytömäki, Finnish actor
- Tuomas Latikka, Finnish football player
- Tuomas Markkula, Finnish footballer
- Tuomas Nieminen, Finnish long track speed skater
- Tuomas Tarkki, Finnish ice hockey goaltender
- Tuomas Peltonen, Finnish footballer
- Tuomas Pihlman, Finnish ice hockey player
- Tuomas Planman, Finnish musician
- Tuomas Rannankari, Finnish footballer
- Tuomas Rantanen, Finnish musician
- Tuomas Sammelvuo, Finnish volleyball player
- Tuomas Santavuori, Finnish professional ice hockey forward
- Tuomas Seppälä, Finnish musician
- Tuomas Suominen, Finnish ice hockey player
- Tuomas Vänttinen, Finnish ice hockey player
- Tuomas Vohlonen, Finnish inventor

=== As a middle name ===
- Toni Tuomas Keränen (born 1998), Finnish javelin thrower

== See also ==
- Tuomaan Markkinat – Finnish Christmas market named after Tuomas
