= Saunassa =

Painting by Akseli Gallen-Kallela

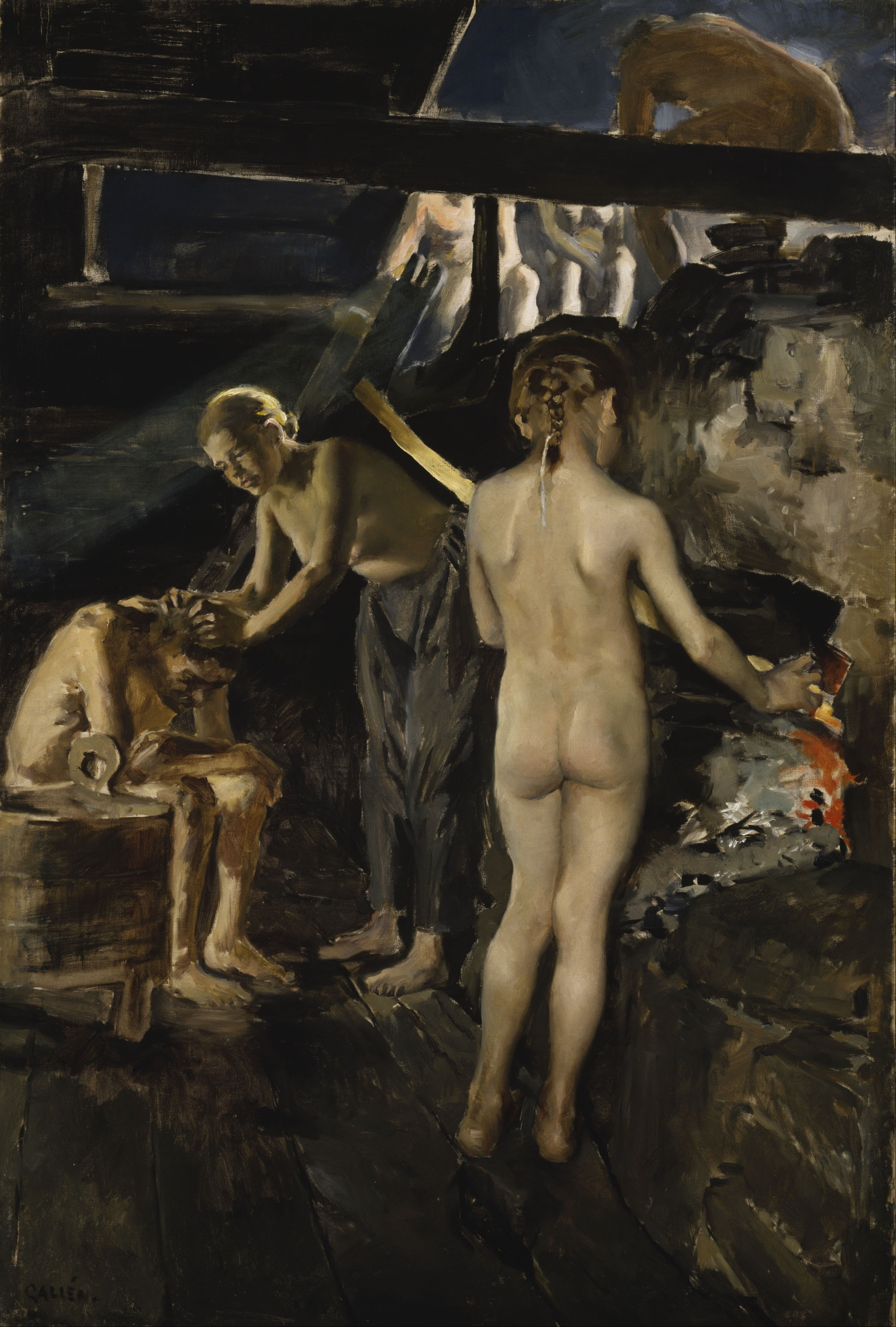
Saunassa (1889)

Saunassa (English: In the Sauna) is an 1889 oil painting by the Finnish artist Akseli Gallen-Kallela. It was painted in Ekola's croft in Keuruu. Gallen-Kallela gave his work to Knut Tilgmann, whose brother gave it to Ateneum in 1922. Gallen-Kallela did not like the picture and thought that it was unfinished.
