= Heidi Sundblad-Halme =

Finnish composer (1903–1973)

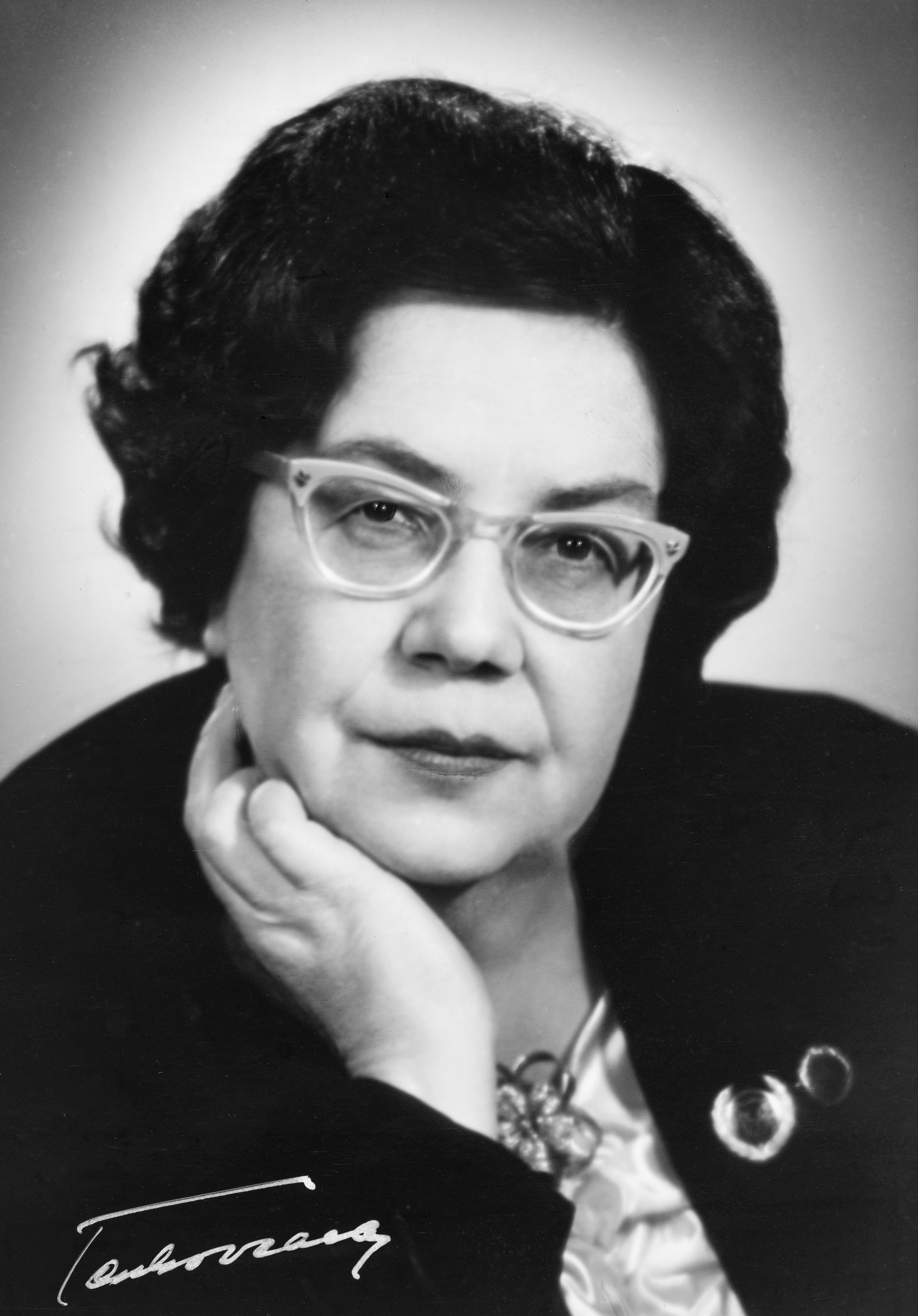
Heidi Sundblad-Halme in 1963.

Heidi Gabriella Wilhelmina Sundblad-Halme (25 September 1903 – 30 April 1973) was a Finnish composer and conductor who founded the Helsinki Women's Orchestra and conducted it for 30 years.

== Career ==
Sundblad-Halme was born in Jakobstad, where her father Henrik Sundblad was a composer, cantor, and organist. She married Deputy Judge Helge Halme in 1930. The couple traveled to the Soviet Union and several Baltic countries, and published accounts of their travels in Finnish newspapers. Sundblad-Halme directed a private music school until they moved to Helsinki in 1933. Their son Hannu was born in 1935.

Sundblad-Halme studied music at the Helsinki Conservatory (later the Sibelius Academy of the University of the Arts Helsinki) from 1927 to 1933, then privately in Berlin and Lund, Switzerland. Her teachers included Dean Dixon, Leo Funtek, Clemens Krauss, Erkki Melartin, Väinö Raitio, and Sulho Ranta. During the mid-1930s, she conducted orchestra concerts in the Finnish cities of Turku, Tampere, and Helsinki. Conductor Georg Schnéevoigt reportedly suggested that Sundblad-Halme start an all-female orchestra so the men in regular orchestras wouldn't be distracted by a female conductor. She formed the Helsinki Women's Orchestra in 1938 and conducted it until 1968.

Sundblad-Halme corresponded with musicologist Otto Andersson and poet Jacob Tegengren, and collaborated with dancer Sage Gundborg-Heilbut. In 1963, she received the Pro Finlandia award, and in 1968, the Director Musices award. In a newspaper interview toward the end of her life, she commented that she “would prefer [to be] a man ... as a woman [I have] received so much opposition and anonymous phone calls and demands to stop all the fuss.”

Sundblad-Halme composed many piano and violin teaching pieces for children. She set texts by the following poets to music: V. M. Fokke, Bertel Gripenberg, L. Onerva, Edith Södergran, Katri Vala, E. von Knape, and Einari Vuorela. Her music was published by Fazer Music (today Fennica Gehrman). Her compositions include:

== Compositions ==
=== Ballet ===
- Enchanted Belt

=== Chamber ===
- Cello Sonata
- String Quartet

=== Orchestra ===
- Elegy, Op. 4 (for string orchestra)
- Pan Suite
- Vishnu, Op. 13 (orchestration of the piano version)

=== Piano ===
- Vishnu

=== Theatre ===
- Au Theatre de Marionnettes, Op. 16

=== Vocal ===
- Cantata
- Finnish Folk Songs
