= Markkula =

Markkula may refer to:

- Markkula (surname), a Finnish surname
- Markkula Center for Applied Ethics, in California, United States
