= Leiviskä =

Leiviskä is a Finnish surname. Notable people with the surname include:

- Helvi Leiviskä (1902–1982), Finnish composer, writer, music educator and librarian at the Sibelius Academy
- Juha Leiviskä (born 1936), Finnish architect and designer
