= Santavuori =

Santavuori may refer to:

- Santavuori (surname), a Finnish surname
- Santavuori (hill), a hill in Finland
