= Joulupöytä =

Traditional assortment of foods served at Christmas in Finland

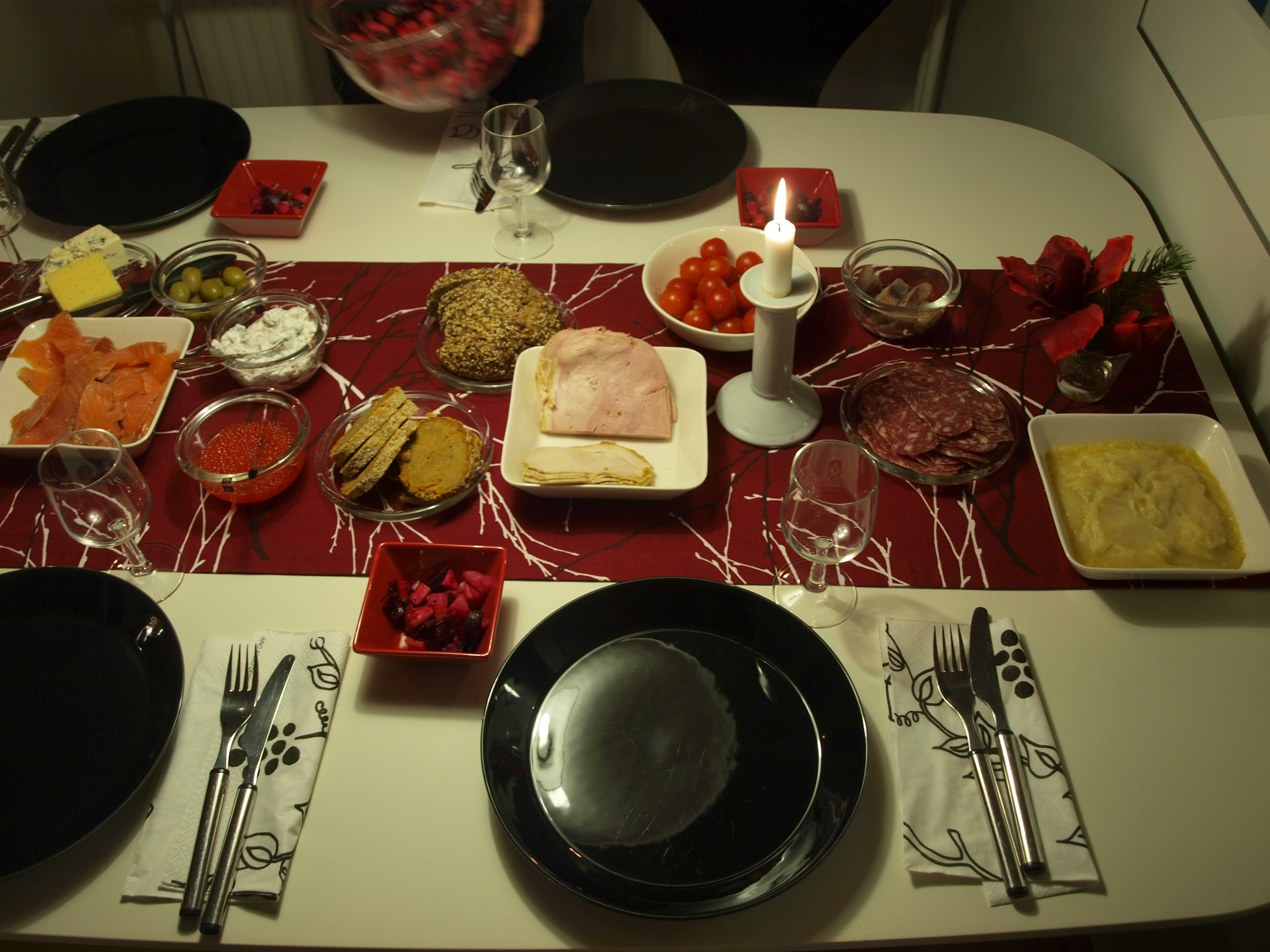
Modern Finnish joulupöytä

Joulupöytä (pronounced [ˈjou̯luˌpøy̯tæ]; "Yule table") is the traditional assortment of foods served on Christmas Eve in Finland. It contains many different dishes, most of them typical for the season.

The main dish is usually a large Christmas ham, which is eaten with mustard. The ham is served with a beetroot-carrot-potato-salad called rosolli, alongside mushroom salad and various casseroles (laatikko) made with swede, carrot or potato, occasionally also a liver casserole. Gravlax and herring are also often served, and sometimes lutefisk (lipeäkala), along with boiled potatoes, peas and rye bread.

Christmas dessert consists of prune jam tarts, gingerbread biscuits and rice porridge, with plum kisel. The traditional dessert beverage is alcoholic or non-alcoholic mulled wine (glögi in Finnish).

== Dishes ==
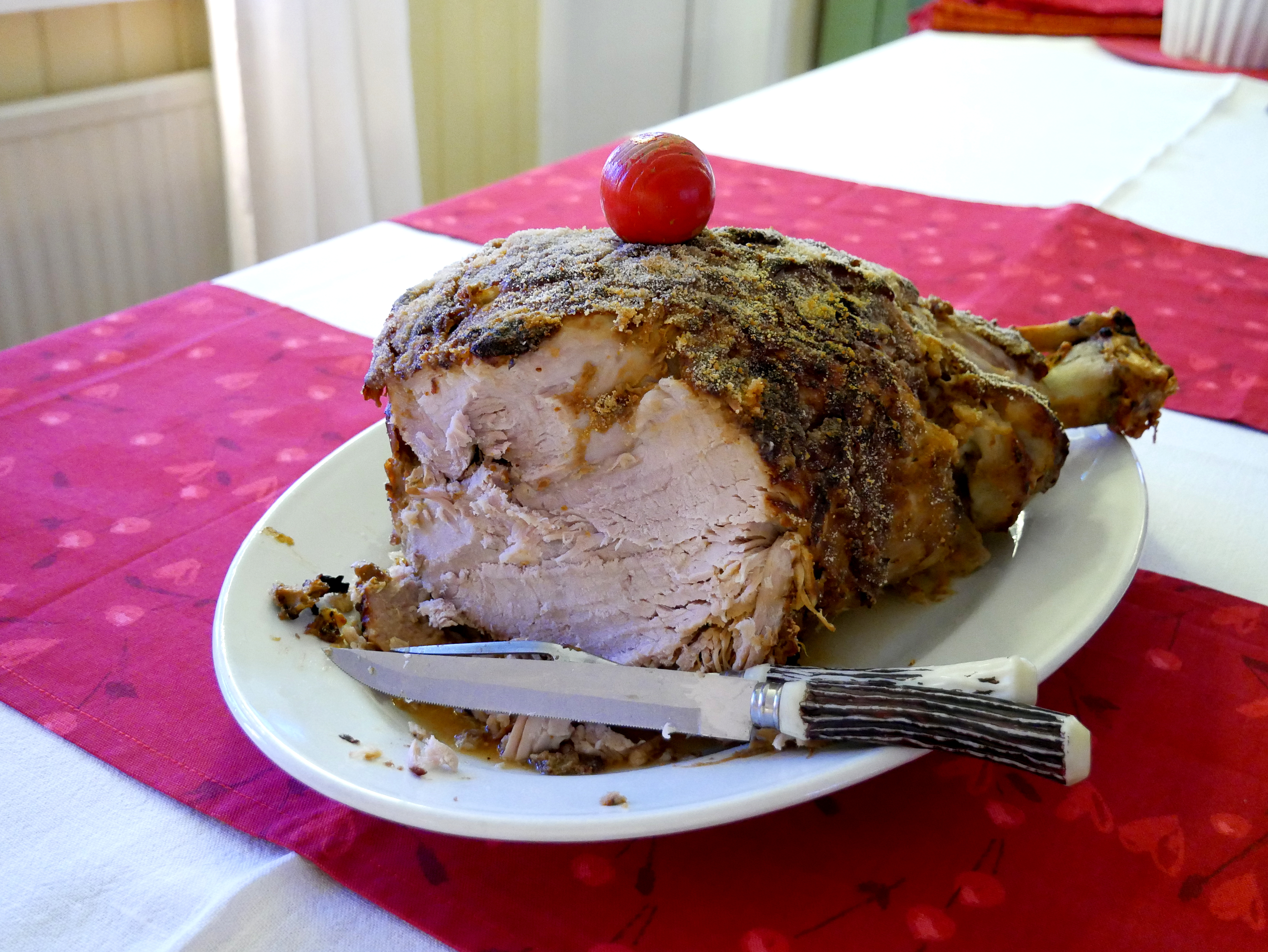
Finnish Christmas ham

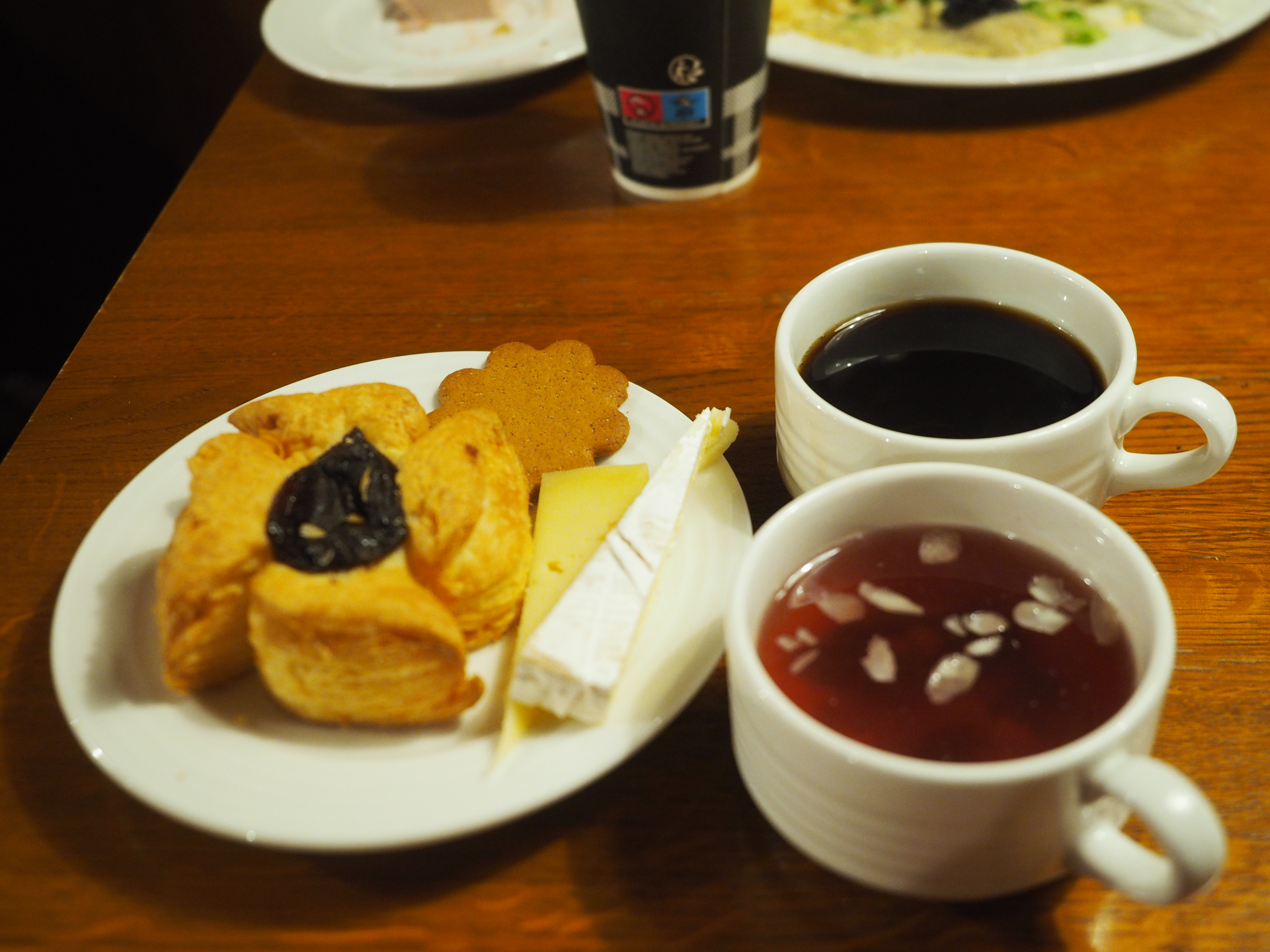
Joulutorttu and Glögi

Most popular dishes in Finnish Christmas table are:

- Christmas ham with mustard
- Rutabaga casserole
- Carrot casserole
- Potato casserole (sweetened or not, depending on the region and preference)
- Rosolli - salad from boiled beetroots, carrots, potatoes, usually also apples and pickled cucumber. Served with a sour cream based sauce and sometimes with eggs or herring
- Potatoes (boiled or smashed)
- Rye bread
- Lax (usually Gravlax), Pickled herring and roe, often served with chopped onion and sour cream
- Mushroom salad
- Boiled peas
- Liver casserole
- Karelian stew
- Lipeäkala with melted butter and white sauce

== Beverages ==
Beverages most often served are:

- Schnapps such as Koskenkorva Viina as an appetizer
- Beer. Most Finnish breweries have also seasonal beers for Christmas. Homemade non-alcoholic beer is also common.
- Milk
- Mulled wine (glögi) either alcoholic or non-alcoholic
- Cream liqueur

== Desserts ==
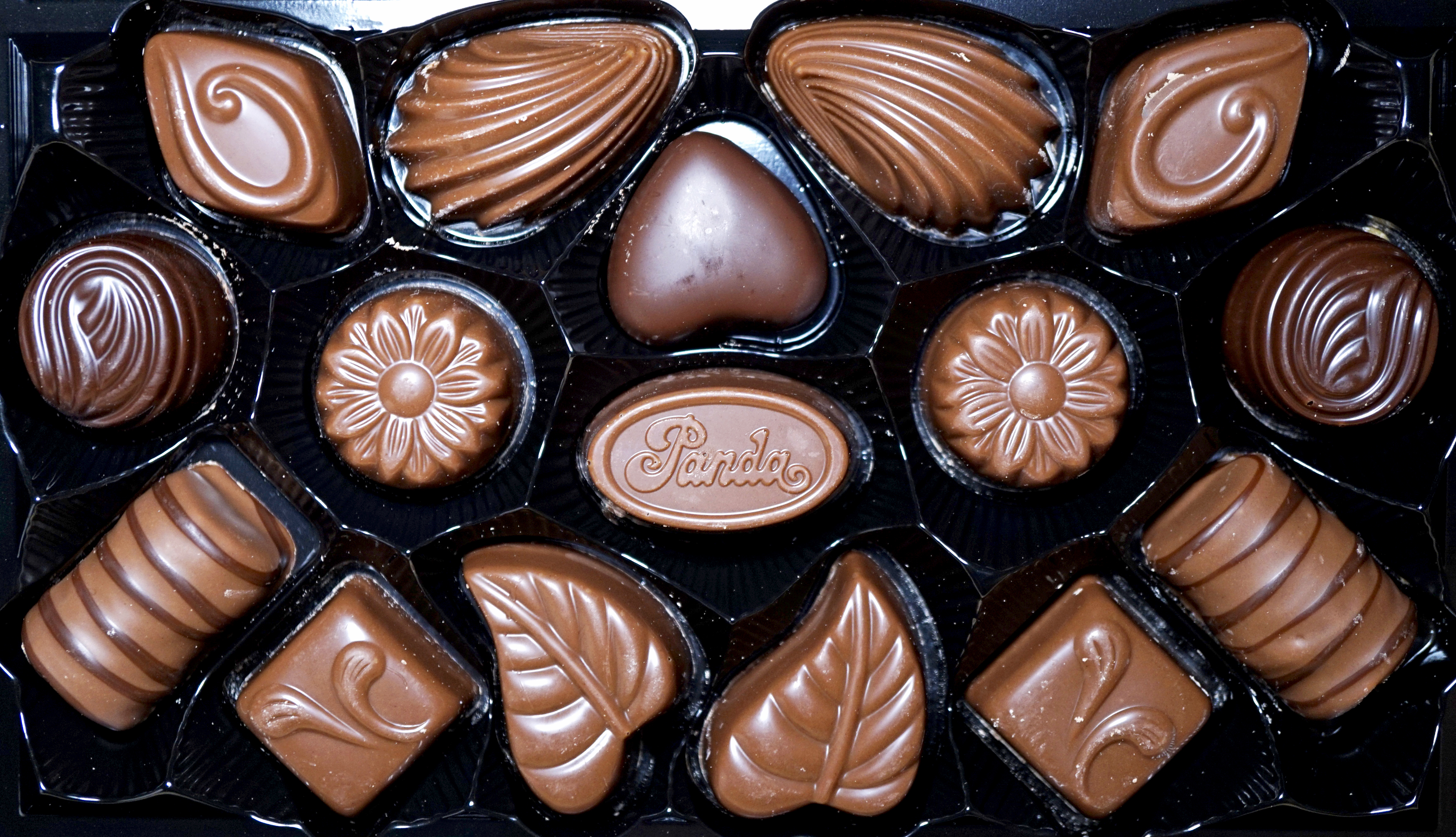
Panda Chocolate praline

Most popular desserts in Finnish Christmas table are:

- Prune jam pastries also known as joulutorttu
- Gingerbread called piparkakku - commonly as flower or star shaped, and sometimes even as 3-dimensional houses, that are decorated with sugar
- Confectioneries and other sweets, especially chocolates and fruit marmalade candies
- Rice porridge (riisipuuro) with cinnamon, sugar and cold milk or with raisin or mixed fruit soup (Usually the rice porridge is served from a large, common kettle and an almond has been hidden in it. The one who gets the almond gets his or her Christmas presents first or gets a wish. Sometimes rice porridge is served as breakfast.)
- Glögi, glögi is usually served with almonds and raisins in it and is alcoholic or non-alcoholic
- Mixed fruit soup or kiisseli which is a plum runny dessert commonly served with rice porridge or sometimes with whipped cream
- Fruit- date- or other type of cake
- Coffee - the Finns prefer a mild roast; tea is less common.
