= Leo Funtek =

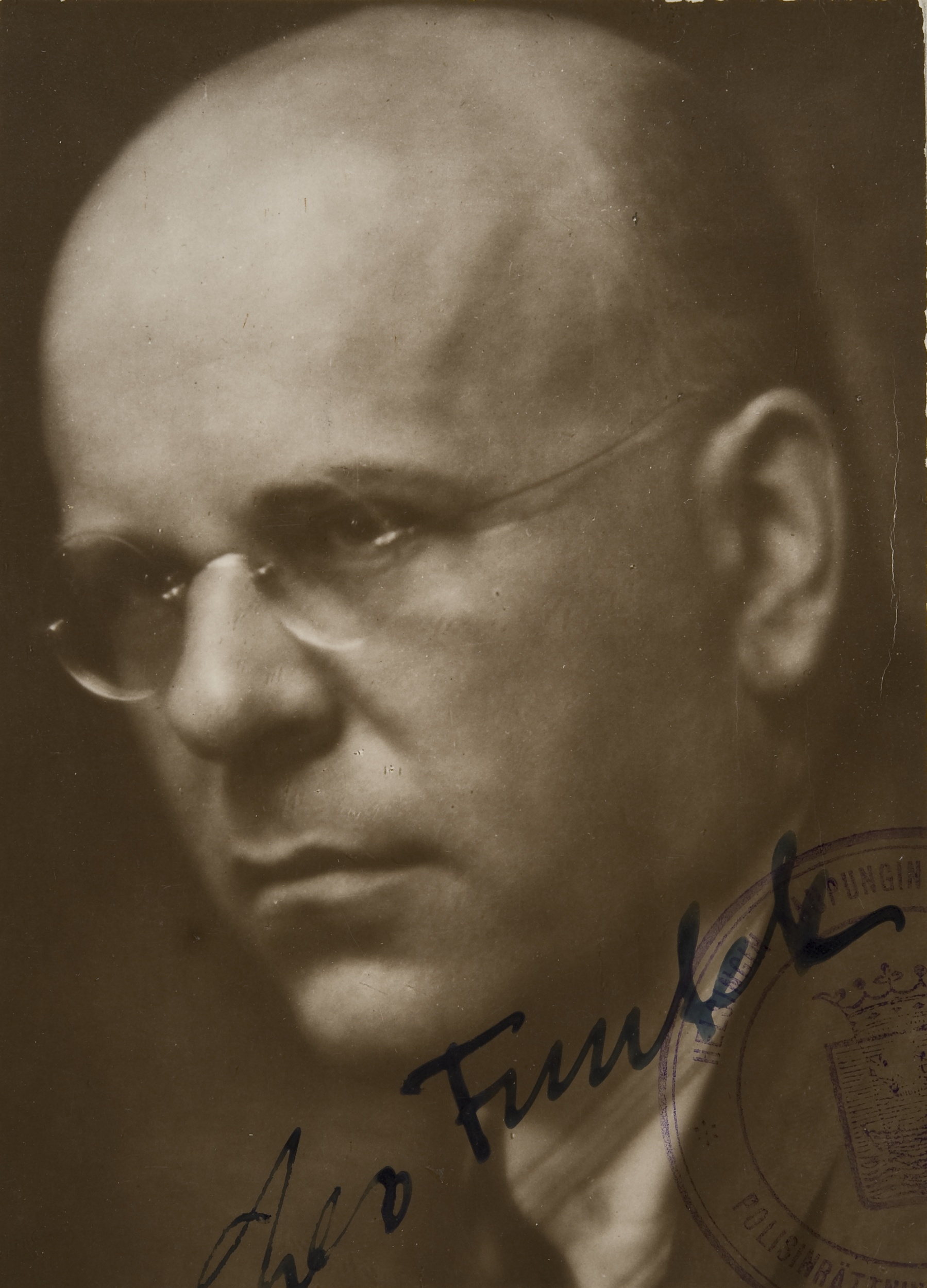
- Born: August 21, 1885; Ljubljana, Slovenia
- Died: January 13, 1965 (aged 79); Helsinki, Finland
- Occupation: musician

Leo Funtek (August 21, 1885 – January 13, 1965) was a Slovenian violinist, conductor and arranger. He is best known for work as a music professor and for his 1922 arrangement of Modest Mussorgsky's piano suite Pictures at an Exhibition.

== Biography ==
Funtek was born in Ljubljana, Austria-Hungary. He received his musical education at the Leipzig Conservatory (now the Felix Mendelssohn College of Music and Theatre) and Leipzig University.

Funtek spent most of his working life in Finland, where he was conductor of the Finnish Opera. He was concertmaster with the Helsinki Philharmonic Orchestra from 1906 to 1909, and then was orchestra director of the Viipuri orchestra from 1909 to 1910. His most prominent role as a practicing musician was as conductor of the Finnish Opera from 1915 to 1959. He also served as assistant concertmaster for the Stockholm court orchestra from 1916 to 1919.

In addition to his work as a practicing musician, Funtek was an academician. His first such post was from 1911 to 1939, at the Helsinki Institute of Music (now the Sibelius Academy), where he taught violin, ensemble and orchestration. He later taught at the Sibelius Academy in Helsinki, where he was a professor of violin at from 1939 to 1955, and where he also taught the conducting class from 1950 to 1955. He is credited with the introduction of orchestral training into the conducting class. Funtek's students included Jorma Panula, who himself went to become a leading professor of conducting; as well as Helvi Leiviskä (1902–1982) and Heidi Sundblad-Halme (1903–1973), two of Finland's most prominent female composers; and the composer Usko Meriläinen.

As an arranger, Funtek is best known for his orchestral arrangement of Pictures at an Exhibition, which he published in July 1922, just months before an orchestration by the French composer Maurice Ravel, of whose project Funtek was seemingly unaware. Ravel's orchestration premiered in October 1922, and is now by far the most-performed of the several orchestrations of the suite. In contrast to other orchestrations, Funtek's adheres closely to Mussorgsky's original piano version.

Funtek was married to Finnish soprano Ingeborg Liljeblad.

He died in Helsinki.
