= Keuruu =

Keuruu Keuru
- Municipality
- Keuruun kaupunki Keuru stad
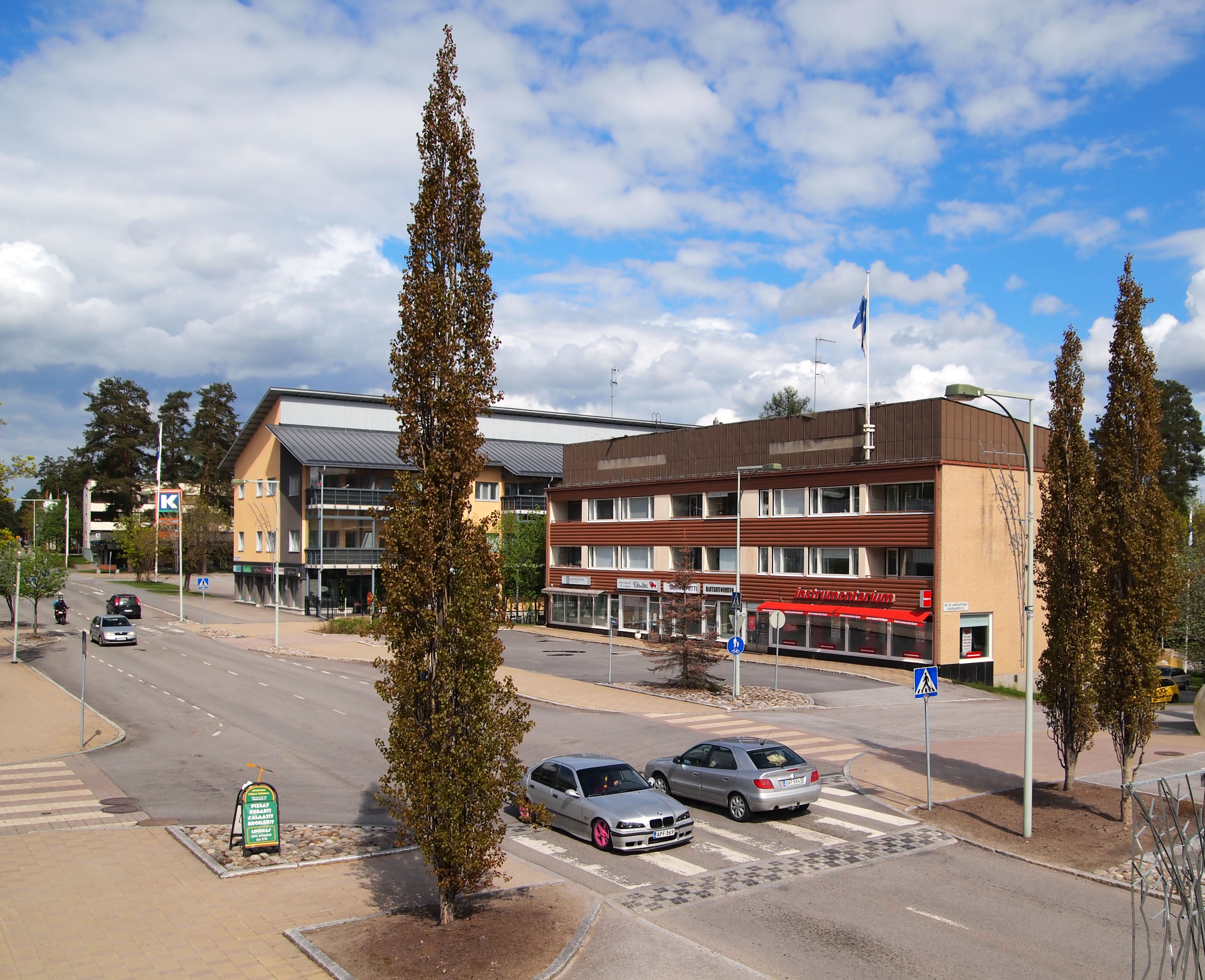

- Coat of arms

- Location of Keuruu in Finland
- Interactive map of Keuruu
- Coordinates: 62°15.5′N 024°42.5′E
- Country: Finland
- Region: Central Finland
- Sub-region: Keuruu sub-region
- Charter: 1652

Government
  - Town manager: Noora Pajari

Area (2018-01-01)
  - Total: 1,430.57 km^{2} (552.35 sq mi)
  - Land: 1,257.97 km^{2} (485.70 sq mi)
  - Water: 172.4 km^{2} (66.6 sq mi)
  - Rank: 56th largest in Finland

Population (2025-12-31)
  - Total: 9,014
  - Rank: 105th largest in Finland
  - Density: 7.17/km^{2} (18.6/sq mi)

Population by native language
  - Finnish: 95.2% (official)
  - Swedish: 0.1%
  - Others: 4.6%

Population by age
  - 0 to 14: 13.2%
  - 15 to 64: 52.3%
  - 65 or older: 34.5%
- Time zone: UTC+02:00 (EET)
  - Summer (DST): UTC+03:00 (EEST)
- Website: www.keuruu.fi

Keuruu (Finnish: [ˈkeu̯ruː]; Swedish: Keuru) is a town and municipality of Finland. It is located in the province of Western Finland and is part of the Central Finland region. The municipality has a population of 9,014 (31 December 2025) and covers an area of 1,430.57 square kilometres (552.35 sq mi) of which 172.4 km^{2} (66.6 sq mi) is water. The population density is 7.17 inhabitants per square kilometre (18.6/sq mi). The town center and Haapamäki village are both the most populated places in Keuruu.

The municipality is unilingually Finnish. The municipality of Pihlajavesi was consolidated with Keuruu in 1969.

The subject of the coat of arms of Keuruu is inspired by agriculture (referenced by crossed flails) and the church trips that were once made in the area on long rowboats. The coat of arms was designed by Olof Eriksson and was adopted on 30 December 1952.

== Geography ==
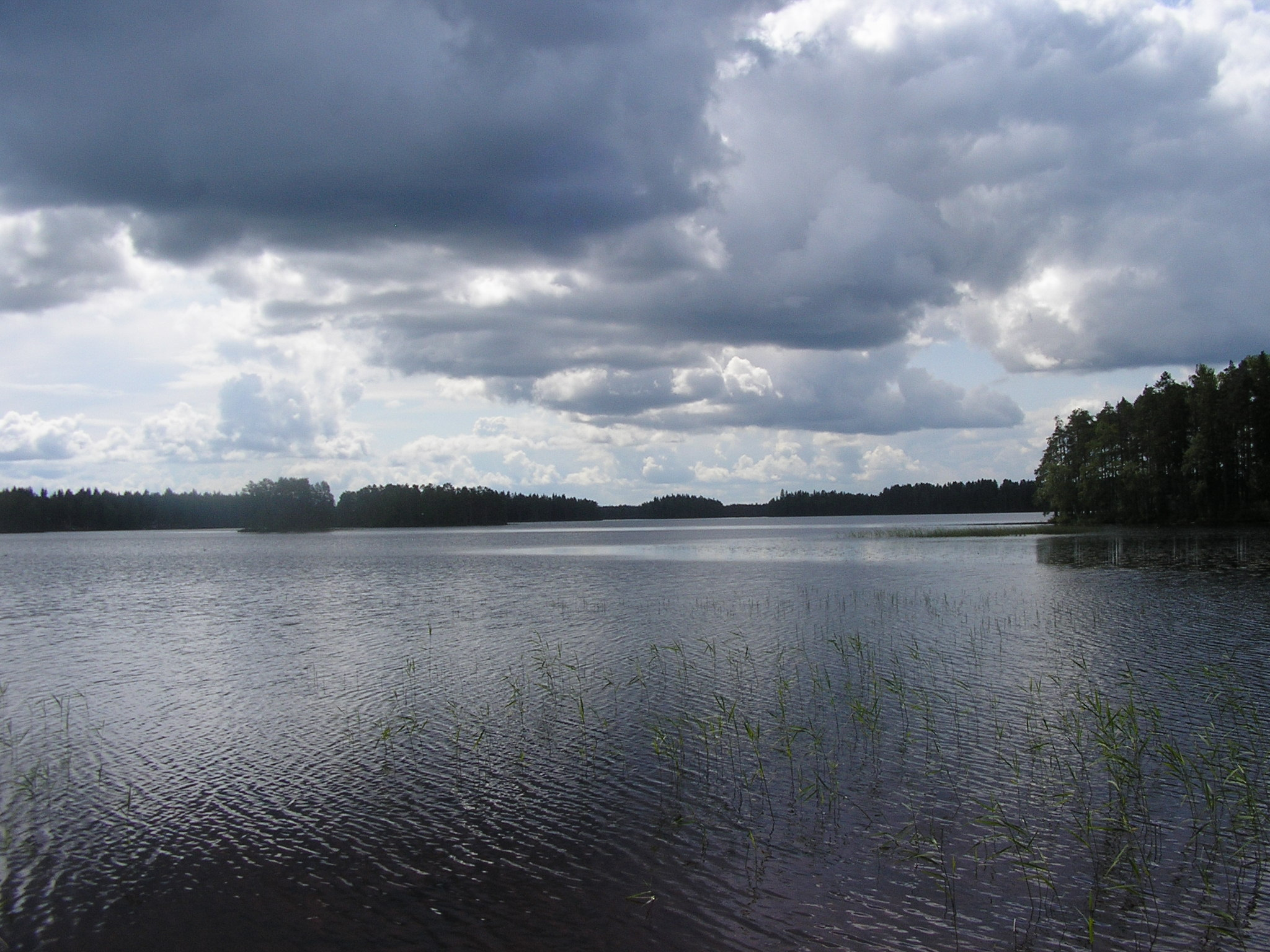
Lake Yltiä in Keuruu

Neighbouring municipalities are Jämsä, Multia, Mänttä-Vilppula, Petäjävesi, Virrat and Ähtäri.

There are 316 lakes in Keuruu such as Keuruun Kaituri, Hallinjärvi, and Kolonjärvi, but the largest of which are Keurusselkä-Ukonselkä, Pihlajavesi, and Liesjärvi.

== History ==
Keuruu was originally known as Keuru. This name is first mentioned in 1552 as a wilderness used for hunting by the people of Sääksmäki. The northern part of the modern municipality was held by the people of Kangasala instead. Savonians settled the area in 1564, but some Tavastians also moved to their hunting grounds in the same area. At the time, it was possible to distinguish Savonians and Tavastians just by their names: Savonians had surnames usually ending in -nen, while that was not the case with the names of Tavastians. Out of the eleven original settlers, six were Savonians (surnames Karjalainen, Koponen, Manninen, Pynnänen, Ruoranen, Tiusanen), and five Tavastians.

The village was first mentioned in 1567 as Köyris. It was a part of the Ruovesi parish since 1571 and until 1636. By 1571, 31 new Savonian settlers had moved into the area while only two Tavastians remained, but more Tavastians came in the 17th century. The Savonians mostly came from Rautalampi and Laukaa. The Savonians and Tavastians later mixed, the local Savonian dialect is a relic of this. The southern part held by Sääksmäki was added to the new Keuruu parish in 1640.

Multia and Pihlajavesi were originally parts of the Keuruu parish. Multia was split off in 1872 and Pihlajavesi in 1910. However, Pihlajavesi rejoined Keuruu in 1969. The villages of Kivijärvi and Niemisvesi in Ähtäri were originally villages of the Keuruu parish.

== Culture ==
=== Sights and events ===
The old church in Keuruu is a wooden church built in the 18th century. It now serves as a museum. The summer Keuruu Market is a popular summer event. Over the years, performers have seen e.g. Matti Nykänen and Danny. Every summer, the Pentecostal Midsummer Conference in the Great Book brings together Christians from all over Finland and the world. The home port of the MS Elias Lönnrot paddle steamer is in Keuruu. The science space is a permanent exhibition space established in Keuruu for the former Karimo school, where technology is presented mainly to young people.

=== Food ===
In the 1980s, Keuruu's traditional parish dishes were the "gutter meat" fried in a wooden trough, a sweetened potato casserole, and bread called varituinen or varilimppu.

== Notable people ==
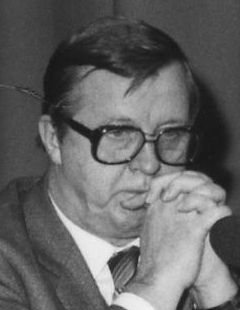
Prime Minister Kalevi Sorsa

- Einari Vuorela, writer
- Hannele Huovi, writer
- Joni Lius, ice hockey player
- Jukka Rautakorpi, professional ice hockey coach
- Kalevi Sorsa, former Prime Minister of Finland
- Matti Kassila, film director
- Mirjami Kuosmanen, actress
- Olli Palola, ice hockey player
- Pirkko Vahtero, graphic designer and heraldist

== International relations ==
=== Twin towns – Sister cities ===
Keuruu is twinned with:

- Jõgeva, Estonia
- Szarvas, Hungary

== See also ==
- Finnish Lake Road
- Finnish national road 58
