= Markkula (surname) =

Markkula is a Finnish surname, and it may refer to:

- Mike Markkula (born 1942), American entrepreneur and Apple CEO
- Mikko Markkula (chess official) (1942–2012), Finnish chairman of the FIDE Qualification Commission
- Mikko Markkula (born 1981), Finnish rally co-driver
- Niko Markkula (born 1990), Finnish footballer
- Tuomas Markkula (born 1990), Finnish footballer
