= Joulutorttu =

Finnish Christmas pastry

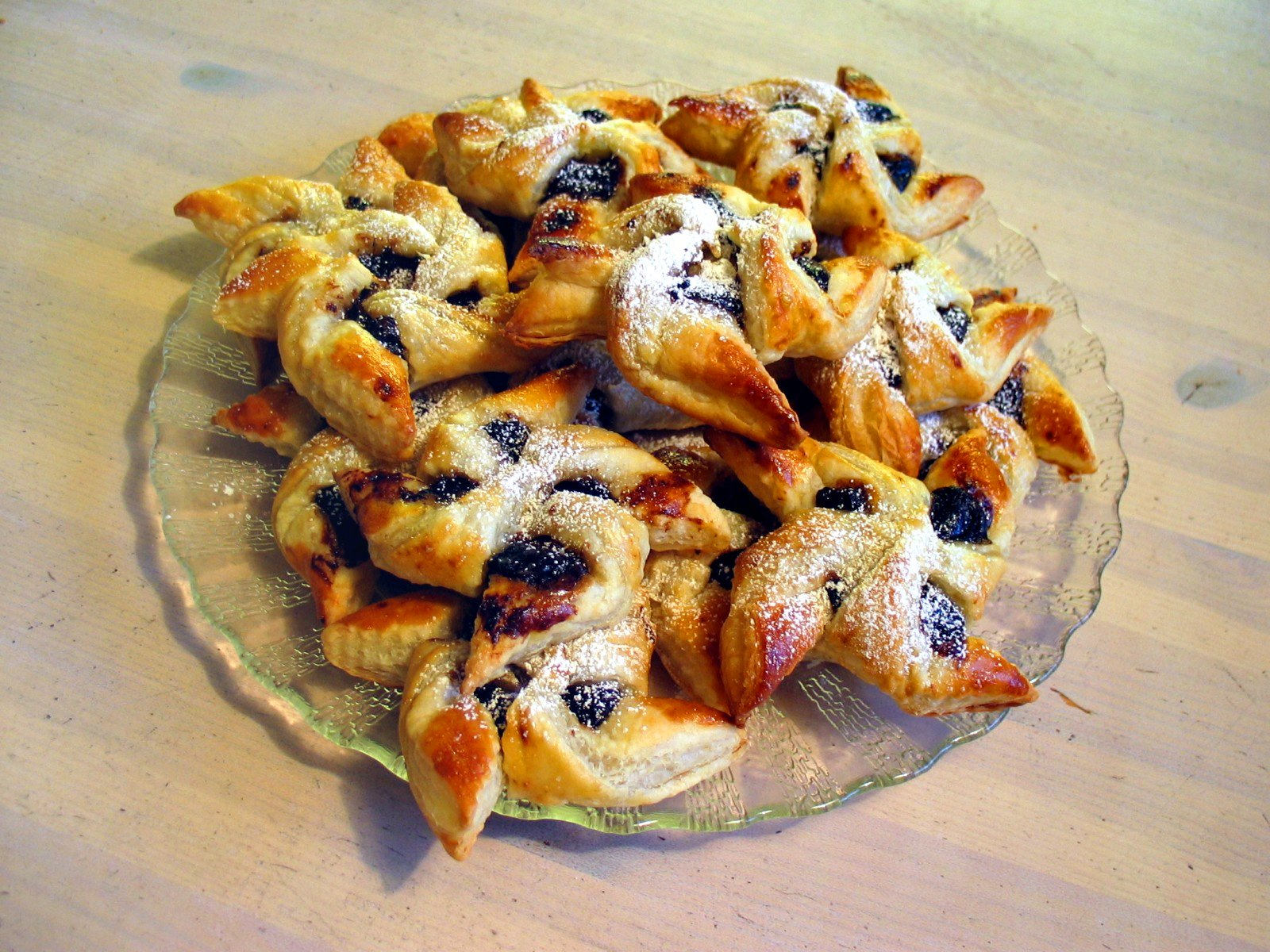
Joulutorttus with prune jam filling

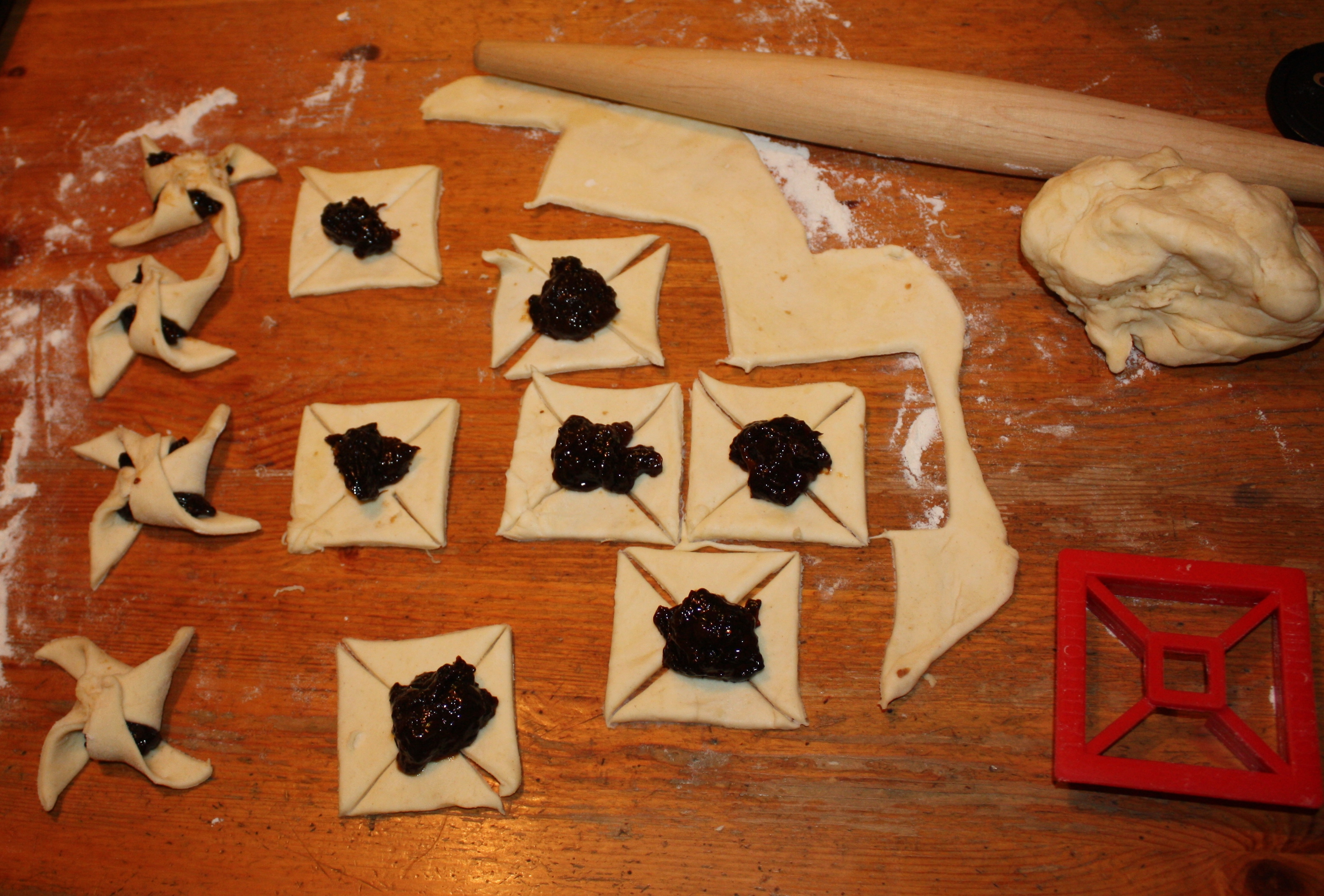
Making joulutorttus

A joulutorttu (Finnish: [ˈjou̯luˌtortːu], lit. "Yule tart", Swedish: jultårta; sometimes known as tähtitorttu [ˈtæhtiˌtortːu], "star tart") is a Finnish Christmas pastry. It is traditionally made from puff pastry in the shape of a star or pinwheel and filled with prune jam and often dusted with icing sugar. The pastries can be made into other shapes and other jams can be used in place of the prune jam.

Joulutorttus are mostly made in Finland but also in Sweden.

In 2020, a company that sells the dough estimated that the average Finn eats about 18 pieces of joulutorttu each year.

== History ==
The Finnish joulutorttu developed in the 19th century from plum-filled pastries originating in England. The recipe originally came via Sweden when it was published in the cookbook Hjelpreda i hushållningen för unga fruentimber, which was written by Cajsa Warg and published in 1755.

== Controversy ==
The first controversy began in November 2013, when the local newspaper Borås Tidning posted a photo of traditional Finnish Christmas pastries on its Facebook page. The newspaper’s intention was simply to spark a discussion about whether it was still too early to start getting into the Christmas spirit.

Many Swedish readers, who were not previously familiar with the Finnish Christmas pastry, saw a direct connection between the pastry’s spiked shape and the swastika. The photo spread rapidly, and the pastry began to be mockingly referred to as a “Nazi tart” (nazibulle or nazitårta).

The same issue has resurfaced on subsequent occasions. For example, in 2016, Sveriges Radio posted a photo of Christmas pastries on social media. Even then, some of the comments accused the broadcaster of spreading swastika symbolism.

== See also ==
- List of pastries
- Joulupöytä
