= Hallinjärvi =

Lake in Keuruu, Finland

- Interactive map of Hallinjärvi
- Location: Keuruu
- Coordinates: 62°04′23″N 24°46′05″E
- Basin countries: Finland
- Surface area: 0.4422 km^{2} (0.1707 sq mi)
- Shore length^{1}: 4.16 km (2.58 mi)
- ^{1} Shore length is not a well-defined measure.

Hallinjärvi is a lake in Keuruu municipality in the province of Central Finland in Finland. The area of the lake is 44 hectares and the coast is 4.16 km long. The lake is part of the Kokemäenjoki main catchment area. It is located approximately 54 km west of Jyväskylä and approximately 210 km north of Helsinki.
