= Tuomo =

Tuomo is a male given name common in Finland. It is a Finnish version of the name Thomas. Common variations of Tuomo in Finland include Tuomas, Toomas, Tomas and Thoma. The nameday is the 21st of December. As of 2013 there are more than 16,000 people with this name in Finland.

== People ==
Some notable people who have this name include:

- Tuomo Kerola (1957–2006), Finnish swimmer
- Tuomo Könönen (born 1977), Finnish football (soccer) player
- Tuomo Lassila (born 1965), Finnish musician
- Tuomo Mannermaa, Finnish theologist
- Tuomo Prättälä (born 1979), Finnish soul and jazz musician, also known by the mononym Tuomo
- Tuomo Polvinen (1931–2022), Finnish historian
- Tuomo Puumala (born 1982), Finnish politician
- Tuomo Ruutu (born 1983), Finnish professional ice hockey forward
- Tuomo Tuormaa (1926-2010), Finnish sprint canoer
- Tuomo Turunen (born 1987), Finnish footballer
- Tuomo Ylipulli (1965–2021), Finnish ski jumper

== Places ==
Tuomo Town

== See also ==
- Tuomas
