= Santavuori (surname) =

Santavuori is a Finnish surname. Notable people with the surname include:

- Tuomas Santavuori (born 1985), Finnish ice hockey player
- Usko Santavuori (1922–2003), Finnish sensationalist radio reporter
