= Pikkujoulu =

Finnish traditional party held to anticipate Christmas

Pikkujoulu (Finnish for "little Christmas") is a Finnish traditional party held to anticipate Christmas. The Pikkujoulu party is non-formal, highly festive, and themed after Christmas. Pikkujoulu parties are held by various communities, organisations, companies, or just among friends. Not to be compared with Lilla jul, the latter of which is annually celebrated the Saturday before 1st advent. Lilla jul is celebrated by the Swedish-speaking population of Finland.

== Description ==
Pikkujoulu differs from Christmas as more free-form and less religious. Traditionally, Pikkujoulu is a day when Christmas dishes are served for the first time. These include rice pudding with fruit. The most traditional Pikkujoulu drink is called "glögi" (the Finnish equivalent of the German Glühwein or mulled wine), which can be served with or without alcohol. Glögi is made of hot juice or red wine and spiced with cinnamon, ginger, clove, raisins, and almonds.

For entertainment, there are festive speeches often followed by jokes or humorous sketches, after which, mock awards are given out. Song books are then passed out and happy Christmas hits are sung in Finnish, English, or Swedish. Christmas karaoke has become quite popular, and any performer will garner applause, no matter how unpleasant they may sound. There could also be a band, stand-up comedian, magician, or funny play. Every Pikkujoulu celebration has a Santa Claus giving out little gag gifts.

In 2011, the Pikkujoulu Christmas parties around Helsinki, Finland caused 400 police calls on the same night. Helsinki police attributed the high number of calls to alcohol consumption.

The Finnish Pikkujoulu is similar to other Nordic pre Christmas traditions, such as the Norwegian julebord and Swedish julbord. In recent years some Norwegians have started to adapt their julebord to the Pikkujoulu, washing out the differences between these Nordic pre Christmas traditions.

== History ==
Pikkujoulu is based on the Advent: the Advent signified the waiting for Jesus Christ and the fasting, which ended on Christmas. In the 19th century, the Advent was sometimes called "the little Christmas", i.e. Pikkujoulu. The tradition originates from Germany and Sweden in the 1800s, before being taken up by Finnish students.

The proper Pikkujoulu tradition started in Helsinki after World War I. The basis for the party was "Christmas tree parties" held in schools. The supper parties held at the end of autumn by student nations gradually formed into the modern Pikkujoulu. Pikkujoulu parties started by student nations grew out to other communities in the 1930s. Before World War II, the parties were sometimes called "porridge parties".

The private family Pikkujoulu is probably based on a tradition stating that the nameday of Tuomas, 21 December, is the first day when tasting home-made beer is allowed. In Sweden, the Tuomas nameday evening is called Lilla jul ("little Christmas"). In time, the tradition evolved to the Saint Lucy's Day celebration, which still resembles the Finnish Pikkujoulu.

== See also ==
- Christmas in Finland
