= Kolonjärvi =

Lake in Finland

- Interactive map of Kolonjärvi
- Location: Keuruu
- Coordinates: 62°15′04″N 24°54′32″E
- Basin countries: Finland
- Surface area: 239.74 ha (592.4 acres)
- Average depth: 4.32 m (14.2 ft)
- Max. depth: 14.83 m (48.7 ft)
- Shore length^{1}: 12.31 km (7.65 mi)
- Surface elevation: 129.7 m (426 ft)
- Islands: 13
- ^{1} Shore length is not a well-defined measure.

Kolonjärvi is a lake in Keuruu in central Finland which is part of the Kokemäenjoki watershed. It has an area of 239 hectares (590 acres), and a coastline of some 12 kilometres (7.5 mi).

According to the Finnish Environment Institute, the lake has 13 islands of various sizes, totaling approximately 4.8 hectares (12 acres). It has a mean depth of 4.32 metres (14.2 ft), with a maximum depth of 14.83 metres (48.7 ft)
