= Keuruun Kaituri =

Lake in Keuruu, Finland

- Interactive map of Keuruun Kaituri
- Location: Keuruu
- Coordinates: 62°10′16″N 24°20′20″E
- Basin countries: Finland
- Surface area: 0.4172 km^{2} (0.1611 sq mi)
- Water volume: 0.000055 km^{3} (1.3×10^{−5} cu mi)
- Shore length^{1}: 9.85 km (6.12 mi)
- Surface elevation: 105.7 m (347 ft)
- ^{1} Shore length is not a well-defined measure.

Keuruun Kaituri is a lake in Keuruu and Mänttä-Vilppula in central Finland. Part of the Kokemäenjoki drainage basin, the lake has an area of 42 hectares, a shoreline length of 9.85 km, and an elevation of 105.7 m above sea level.

The lake is long and narrow and stretches in a north-westerly direction. It is located approximately 73 km west of Jyväskylä and 220 km north of Helsinki.
