= Einari Vuorela =

Finnish writer

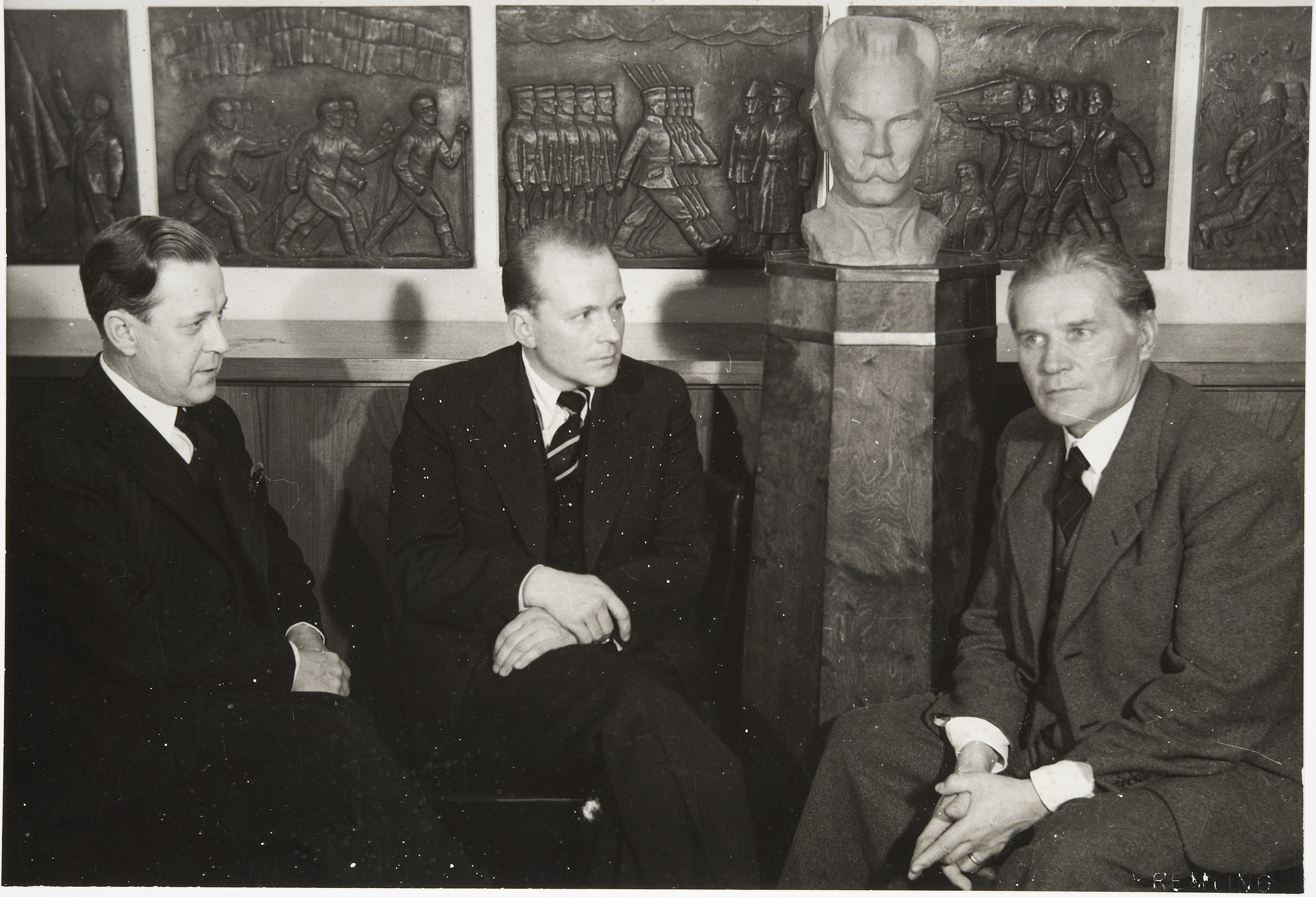
Kaarlo Marjanen, Kalervo Kallio and Einari Vuorela in 1944.

Einari Arvid Vuorela (17 August 1889, in Keuruu – 10 July 1972, in Helsinki) was a Finnish writer. He was born in the village Jukojärvi in a family of 10 children, and started his studies at Multia. He became a teacher in Jyväskylä in 1914. His wife from 1939 was writer Laura Soinne. Finnish composer Heidi Sundblad-Halme set several of his poems to music.

He won the Eino Leino Prize in 1966.

== Books ==
- Puut ajattelevat (1967)
- Kiurun portaat (1971)
- Siintää himmeyden metsät (1975)
- Täältä kaukana (1927)
- Kullanhuuhtoja (1934)

== Other webpages ==
- Einari Vuorela
