= Tuomo Town =

Town in Delta State, Nigeria

- Town
- Tuomo Town waterfront

- Location in Nigeria
- Coordinates: 5°06′33″N 5°52′44″E
- Country: Nigeria
- State: Delta State
- Local Government Area: Burutu
- Time zone: UTC+1 (WAT)

Tuomo Town is the headquarters of Tuomo Clan which is situated in present-day Burutu Local Government Area of Delta State, Nigeria. It lies along the Forcados River, popularly known by the Ijaws as Boloutoru. It is made up of three quarters, viz: Foukonou, Akerebunu and Ekeremobiri. Other towns that are in the same clan with Tuomo are: Bolou-Tebegbe and Bolou-Tamibge which later gave birth to Toru-Tebegbe and Toru-Tamigbe in their present settlement along the creek and Torugbene. Ogbobagbene was the youngest town moved out of Akerebunu in Tuomo to settle in the same creek before Toru-Tebegbe due to fishing.

== Etymology ==
The etymology of the word Tuomo (Tuama) means 'grass town' and was the name accorded to the town due to it high level of grasses during the time of settlement.
