= Joni Lius =

Finnish ice hockey player

- Born: March 4, 1971 (age 54); Keuruu, Finland
- Height: 5 ft 10 in (178 cm)
- Weight: 180 lb (82 kg; 12 st 12 lb)
- Position: Center
- Shot: Left
- Played for: JYP; Frölunda HC; Vienna Capitals; TPS Turku
- Playing career: 1989–2006

Joni Lius (born March 4, 1971) is a Finnish former professional ice hockey player.

Lius began his career with JYP and stayed with the team for seven seasons. He played for Frölunda HC in the Elitserien for two seasons and the Vienna Capitals in the Austrian Ice Hockey Association for one year. Lius also played seven seasons with TPS Turku in the SM-liiga.

== Career statistics ==
			Regular season					Playoffs
Season	Team	League	GP	G	A	Pts	PIM	GP	G	A	Pts	PIM
1989–90	Jyp HT	SM-liiga	7	0	0	0	0	3	0	0	0	0
1990–91	Jyp HT	SM-liiga	14	0	0	0	0	5	0	0	0	0
1991–92	Jyp HT	SM-liiga	40	8	10	18	8	—	—	—	—	—
1992–93	Jyp HT	SM-liiga	48	12	16	28	10	10	1	4	5	0
1993–94	Jyp HT	SM-liiga	48	9	24	33	22	4	1	1	2	4
1994–95	Jyp HT	SM-liiga	41	9	24	33	22	4	1	1	2	0
1995–96	Jyp HT	SM-liiga	48	12	22	34	14	—	—	—	—	—
1996–97	Västra Frölunda HC	Elitserien	49	7	23	30	20	1	0	0	0	0
1997–98	Västra Frölunda HC	Elitserien	42	5	12	17	8	7	2	1	3	2
1998–99	HC TPS	SM-liiga	49	14	19	33	10	8	1	4	5	4
1999–00	HC TPS	SM-liiga	38	4	8	12	14	8	4	2	6	2
2000–01	HC TPS	SM-liiga	53	10	23	33	12	10	2	5	7	2
2001–02	Vienna Capitals	Austria	31	5	17	22	4	8	0	6	6	2
2002–03	HC TPS	SM-liiga	53	6	21	27	29	7	1	2	3	0
2003–04	HC TPS	SM-liiga	17	1	3	4	0	13	0	2	2	4
2004–05	HC TPS	SM-liiga	56	10	19	29	10	6	1	0	1	0
2005–06	HC TPS	SM-liiga	47	4	12	16	26	2	0	0	0	0
SM-liiga totals			559	99	200	299	167	80	12	21	33	16
