= Tuomas Vänttinen =

Finnish ice hockey player

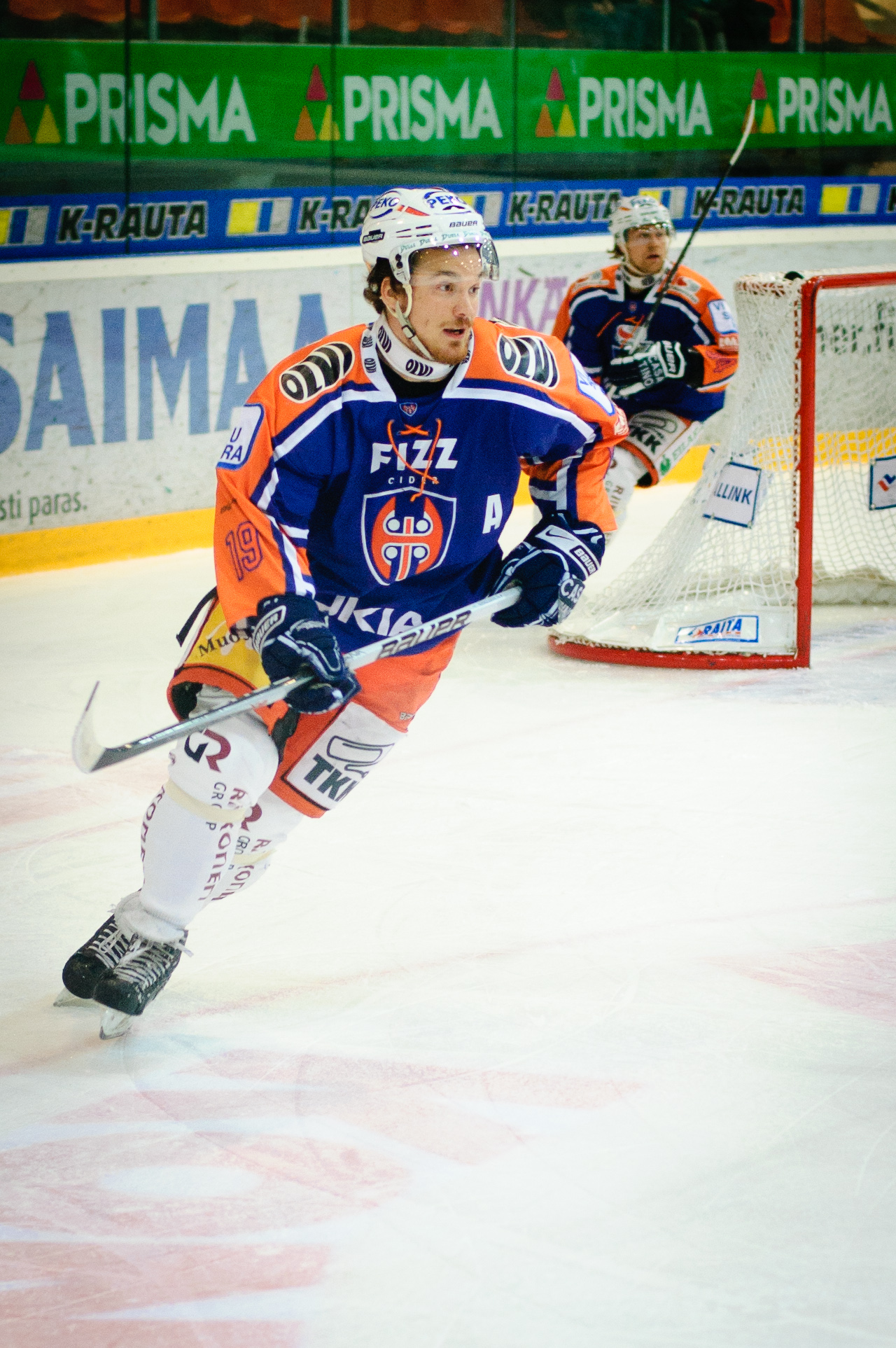
- Born: 29 July 1983 (age 41); Savonlinna, Finland
- Height: 5 ft 9 in (175 cm)
- Weight: 201 lb (91 kg; 14 st 5 lb)
- Position: Centre
- Shot: Right
- Played for: SaPKo; SaiPa; KooKoo; Haukat; JYP Jyväskylä; D Team; Tappara; LeKi; HPK; Vaasan Sport; SG Cortina; Fehérvár AV19
- NHL draft: Undrafted
- Playing career: 2003–2019

Tuomas Vänttinen (born 29 July 1983) is a Finnish professional ice hockey player, currently playing for Vaasan Sport of the Finnish Liiga.

== Career statistics ==
			Regular season					Playoffs
Season	Team	League	GP	G	A	Pts	PIM	GP	G	A	Pts	PIM
1998–99	SaPKo U16	U16 SM-sarja Q	8	3	3	6	16	—	—	—	—	—
1999–00	SaPKo U20	U20 I-Divisioona	12	5	16	21	14	—	—	—	—	—
2000–01	SaPKo U20	U20 I-Divisioona	13	9	8	17	22	—	—	—	—	—
2000–01	SaPKo	Suomi-sarja	34	15	15	30	38	—	—	—	—	—
2001–02	SaiPa U20	U20 SM-liiga	42	17	19	36	69	9	7	2	9	8
2002–03	SaiPa U20	U20 SM-liiga	29	12	20	32	62	3	1	1	2	2
2002–03	SaiPa	SM-liiga	15	0	0	0	0	—	—	—	—	—
2003–04	SaiPa U20	U20 SM-liiga	8	6	7	13	33	—	—	—	—	—
2003–04	SaiPa	SM-liiga	30	1	4	5	8	—	—	—	—	—
2003–04	KooKoo	Mestis	14	7	5	12	6	9	0	4	4	4
2004–05	SaiPa	SM-liiga	52	9	15	24	20	—	—	—	—	—
2004–05	Haukat	Mestis	3	1	2	3	2	—	—	—	—	—
2005–06	SaiPa	SM-liiga	53	8	16	24	41	8	3	6	9	4
2006–07	JYP Jyväskylä	SM-liiga	54	10	15	25	46	—	—	—	—	—
2007–08	JYP Jyväskylä	SM-liiga	51	5	8	13	38	6	0	1	1	2
2008–09	JYP Jyväskylä	SM-liiga	38	3	0	3	51	13	1	4	5	31
2008–09	D Team	Mestis	5	1	2	3	6	—	—	—	—	—
2009–10	JYP Jyväskylä	SM-liiga	48	7	15	22	8	14	1	4	5	6
2010–11	Tappara	SM-liiga	52	10	10	20	26	—	—	—	—	—
2011–12	Tappara	SM-liiga	21	4	1	5	14	—	—	—	—	—
2011–12	LeKi	Mestis	1	1	1	2	0	—	—	—	—	—
2012–13	HPK	SM-liiga	48	10	8	18	34	5	1	2	3	6
2013–14	HPK	Liiga	38	7	12	19	16	6	0	3	3	2
2014–15	HPK	Liiga	56	8	17	25	36	—	—	—	—	—
2015–16	Vaasan Sport	Liiga	57	18	16	34	18	2	0	0	0	0
2016–17	Vaasan Sport	Liiga	59	6	11	17	18	—	—	—	—	—
2017–18	Tölzer Löwen	DEL2	—	—	—	—	—	—	—	—	—	—
2018–19	SG Cortina	AlpsHL	32	11	16	27	6	—	—	—	—	—
2018–19	Fehérvár AV19	EBEL	7	2	0	2	2	6	2	1	3	2
Liiga totals			672	106	148	254	364	54	6	20	26	51
