= Helsinki Christmas Market =

Annual Christmas market in Helsinki

Coordinates: 60.1694°N 24.9522°E

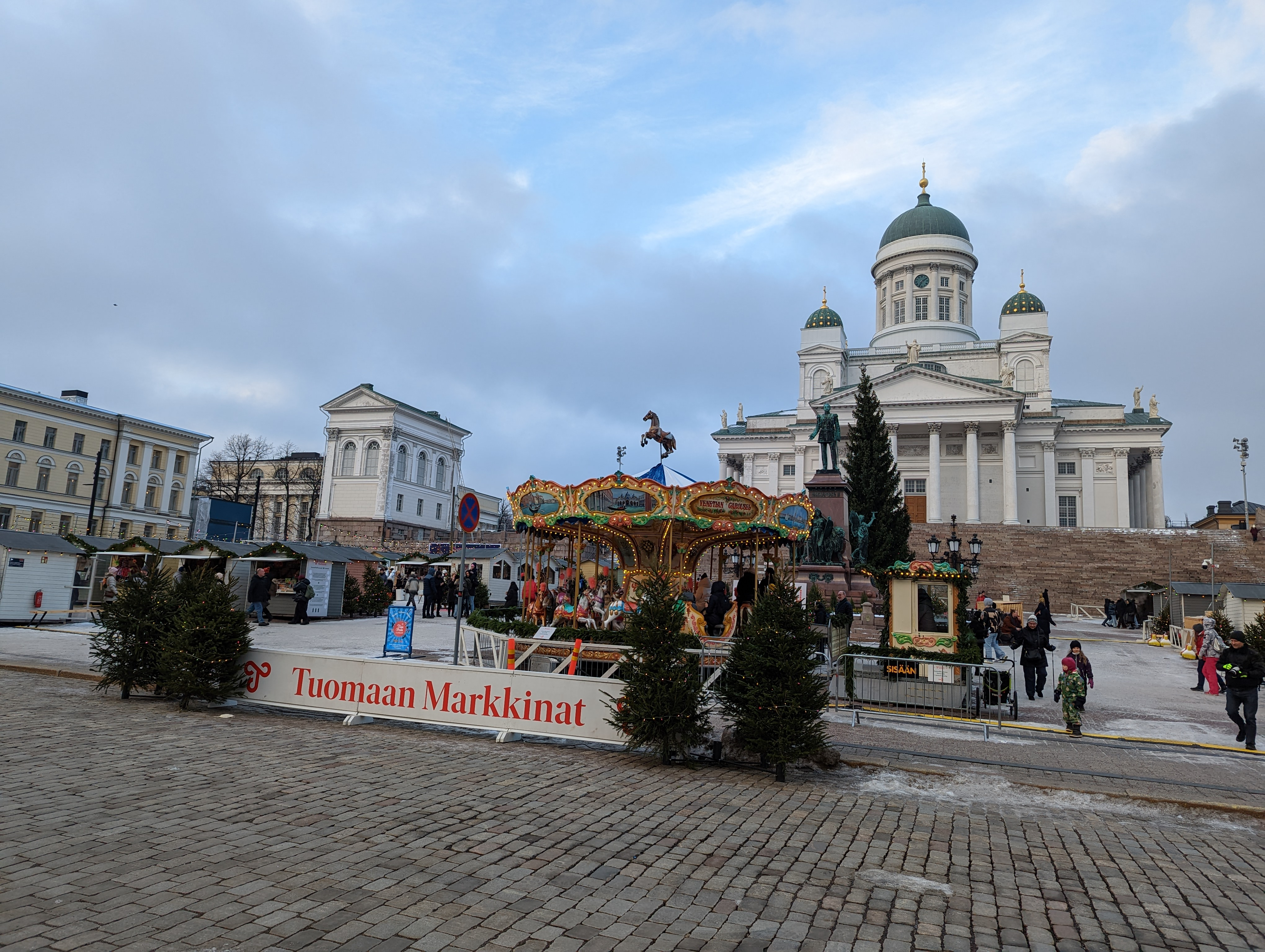
Helsinki Christmas Market in 2022

Helsinki Christmas Market (Finnish: Tuomaan Markkinat; Swedish: Tomasmarknaden; lit. 'St. Thomas Market') is a Christmas market held every year in Helsinki, Finland. It is visited by more than 600,000 people every year. The event has been organized since 1994. Originally it was held in Esplanadi Park for a long time, until they moved to their current venue, the Senate Square.

The opening of the Helsinki Christmas Market is always on 1 December and lasts until 22 December. The event brings almost 100 artisans and small producers from all over Finland, as well as more than 20 delicacy sellers, and cafe and restaurant operators to the Senate Square. There is also a vintage-styled carousel, which is free for market visitors.

In 2023 and 2024, Tamara Hardingham-Gil from a multinational news channel CNN listed the Helsinki Christmas Market as one of the best Christmas markets in the world.

== See also ==
- List of Christmas markets
- Christmas in Finland
