= Maksalaatikko =

Finnish liver casserole

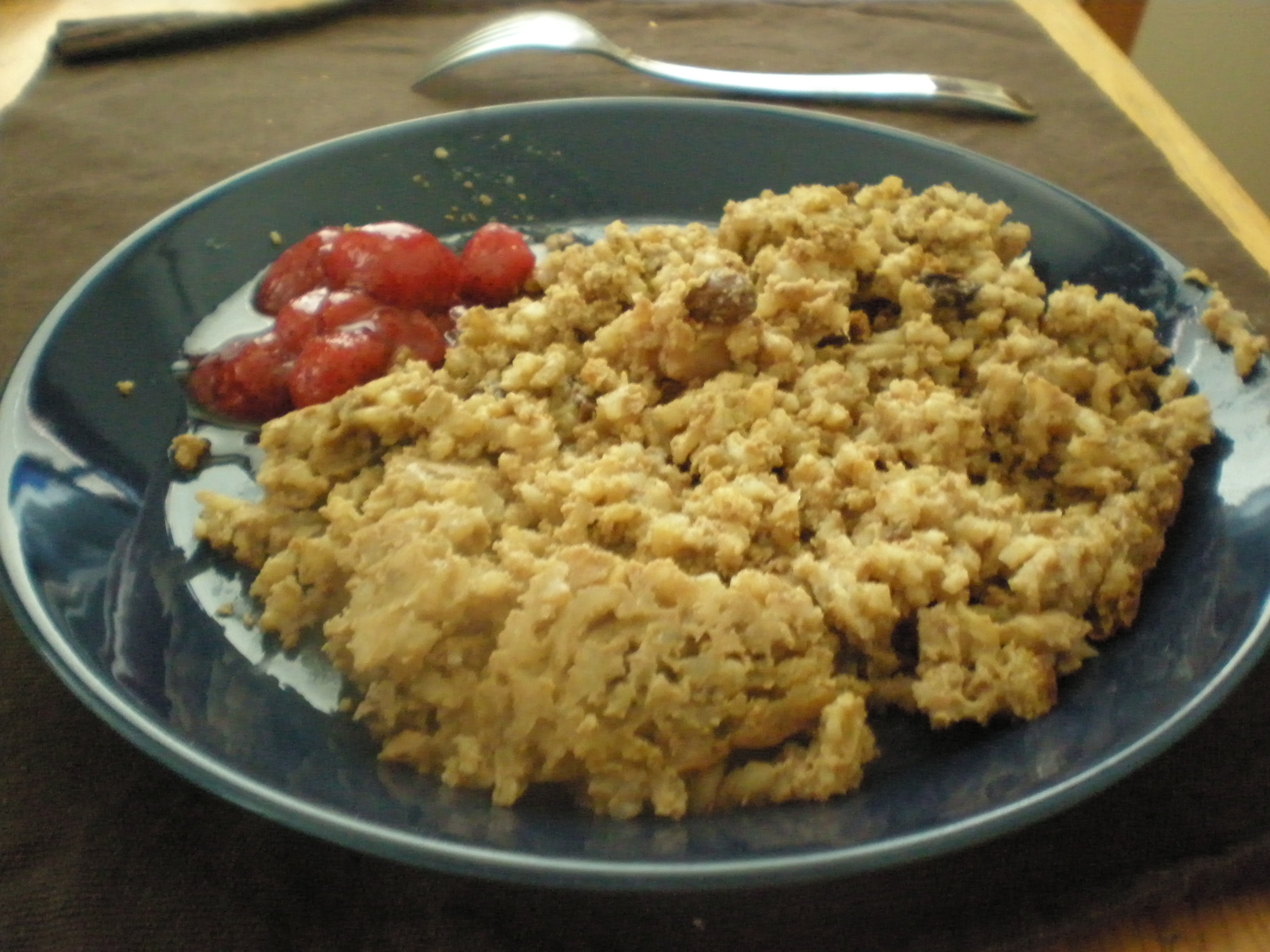
Finnish liver casserole

Liver casserole (Finnish: maksalaatikko, Swedish: leverlåda) is a Finnish food that is made of rice, ground liver, butter, syrup, egg, onion, and raisin. It is traditionally served with lingonberry jam.

It is also sold ready-to-eat and eaten as an everyday food, and appears commonly in school lunches. In 2011, a Gallup poll of 299 schoolchildren found that liver casserole was the least liked dish in the school menus. Nevertheless, it remains as a popular convenience food.

Traditionally maksalaatikko was eaten at Christmas but these days it is rather seen as a year-round daily dish.

== See also ==
- List of casserole dishes
- Porkkanalaatikko
- Lanttulaatikko
- Chopped liver
