= Helvi Leiviskä =

Finnish composer (1902–1982)

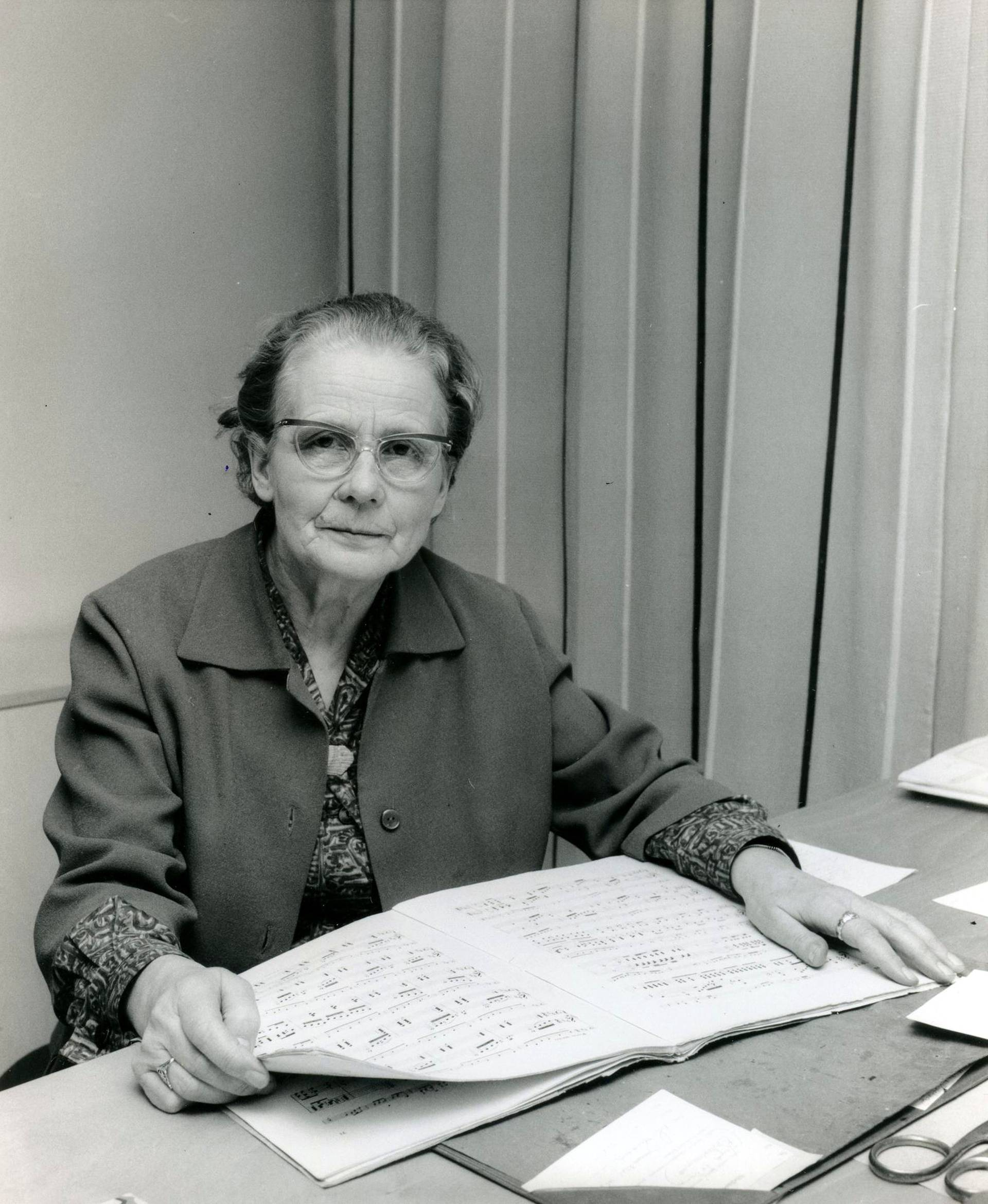
- The composer in 1964.
- Born: 25 May 1902; Helsinki, Grand Duchy of Finland
- Died: 12 August 1982 (aged 80); Helsinki, Finland

Helvi Lemmikki Leiviskä (25 May 1902 – 12 August 1982) was a Finnish composer, writer, music educator, and librarian at the Sibelius Academy.

== Life ==
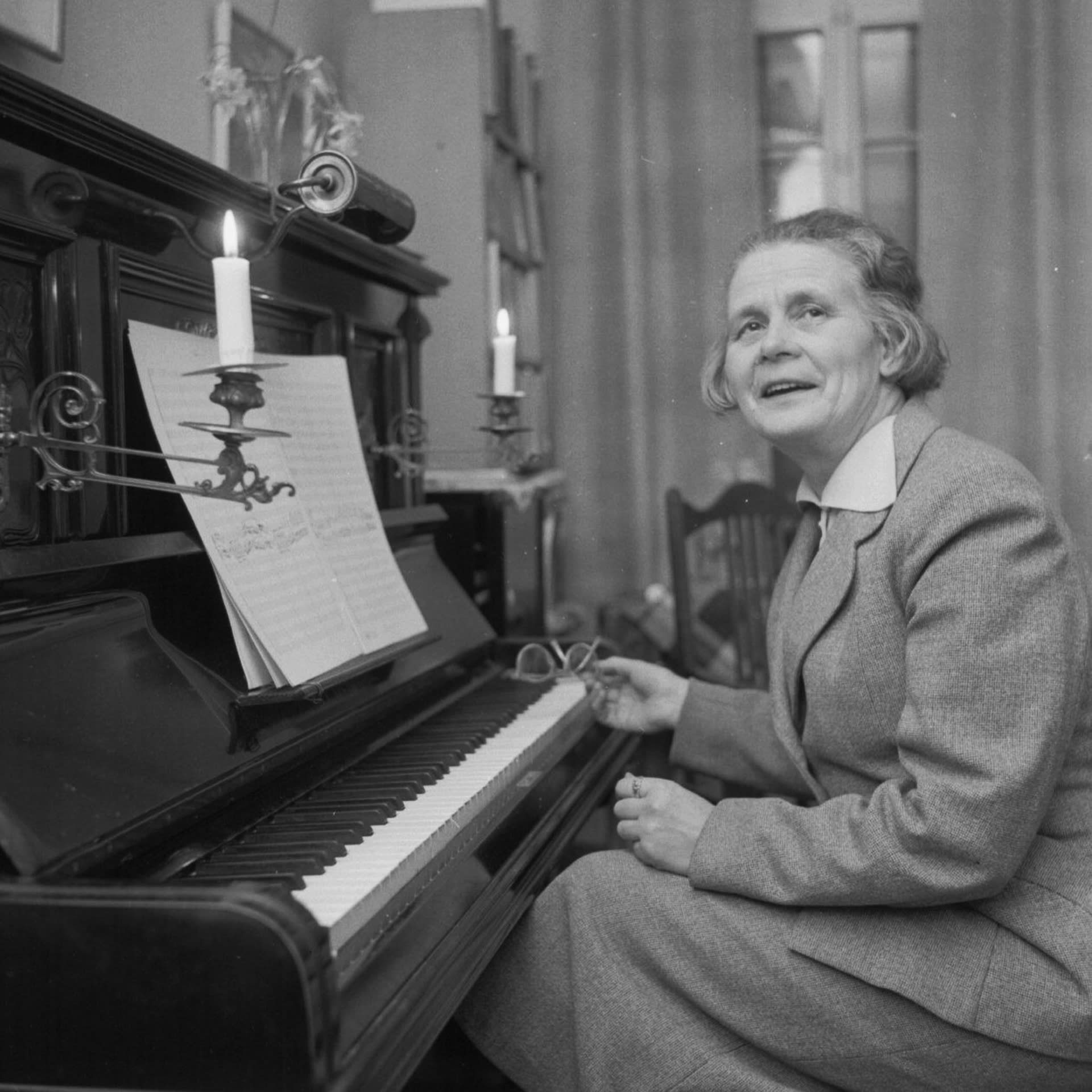
Leiviska in 1950

Helvi Leiviskä was born in 1902 in Helsinki, Grand Duchy of Finland, and in 1927 graduated in composition from the Helsinki Music Institute (now the Sibelius Academy), where she studied with the Finnish composer Erkki Melartin. She continued her studies in Vienna, and then returned to Finland where she studied with the Finnish composer Leevi Madetoja.

She began work as a composer with a debut in 1935, and also worked as a music teacher privately and in public schools from 1922 to 1938. In 1933, she took a position as librarian at the Sibelius Academy.

After World War II, Leiviskä continued her studies with the Slovenian conductor Leo Funtek, and wrote reviews for periodicals including Ilta-Sanomat.

Leiviskä died in Helsinki at 80 years of age.

== Selected works ==
- Piano Concerto, 1935
- Triple Fugue for Orchestra, 1938
- Symphony No. 1, 1947
- Symphony No. 2, 1954
- Symphony No. 3, 1971
- Sinfonia Brevis, 1962
- Folk Dance Suite (Kansantanssisarja), 1934
- Hobgoblin of Darkness (Pimeän peikko), 1942
- The Lost Continent (Mennyt manner) for choir and orchestra, 1957
- Juha (film music), 1937
- Violin Sonata, 1945
- Piano Quartet, 1926

== Discography ==
- Helvi Leiviskä: Violin Sonata / Piano Quartet / Symphony No. 3. Finlandia Classics. (FINCLA-1, 2012). [historical recordings from Finnish Radio, 1950s–1970s]
- Helvi Leiviskä: Piano Concerto / Symphony No 1. Ari Rasilainen, Staatskapelle Weimar, and Oliver Triendl (piano). Hänssler Classic (HC23050, 2023).
- Helvi Leiviskä: Orchestral Works, Vol. 1: Sinfonia brevis / Suite for Orchestra No. 2 / Symphony No. 2. Dalia Stasevska and the Lahti Symphony Orchestra. BIS (BIS 2701, 2023).

== Awards ==
- Pro Finlandia Medal, 1962
