= Jacob Tegengren =

Swedish-Finnish writer, banker, and naturalist

Jacob August Tegengren
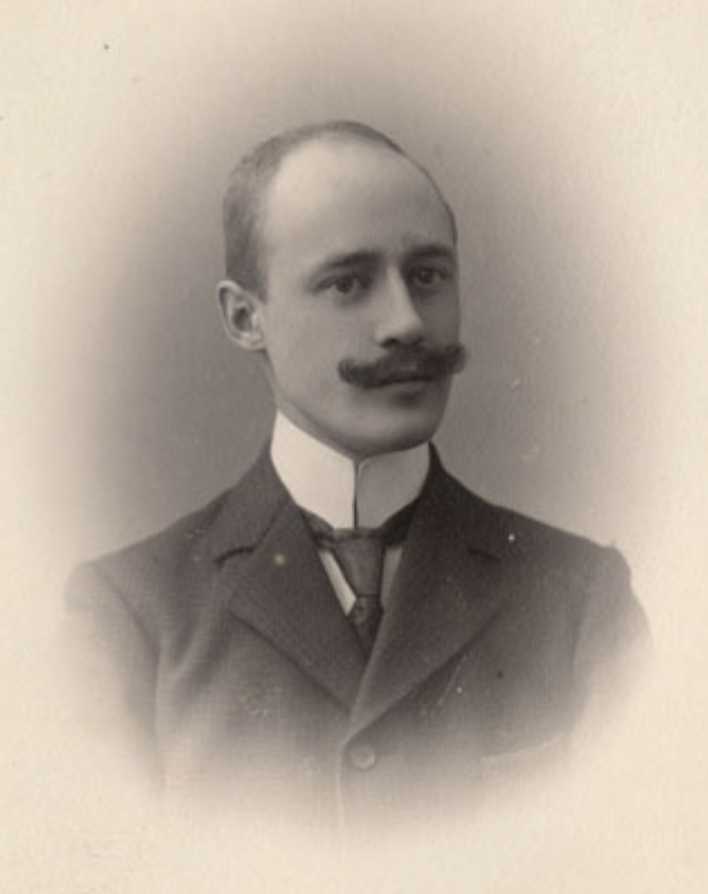
- Born: August 28, 1875; Vaasa, Finland
- Died: November 25, 1956 (aged 81)
- Occupations: Writer, banker, naturalist
- Known for: Agronomist at the Mustiala Agricultural Institute

Jacob August Tegengren (28 August 1875 – 25 November 1956) was a Swedish–Finnish writer, banker, nature poet, naturalist, and archaeologist. He was an agronomist at the Mustiala Agricultural Institute from 1899 to 1900 after which he taught at a school before directing a bank in Vörå.

== Early life ==
Tegengren was born in Vaasa to lawyer Ernst Wilhelm and Aline Irene Boy.

== Career ==
He worked as an agronomist at the Mustiala Agricultural Institute in 1899 before working at a school in Åland and later Närpes. He became a director of the Förningsbanken in Vörå from 1915 and worked there until 1940.

He wrote poems in Swedish as well as Finnish dealing with nature. He also contributed to the Swedish psalm book and contributed hymns.

He took an interest in archaeological studies and worked with Alfred Hackman (1864–1942) to lead excavations of iron age sites in South Ostrobothnia. He discovered burial sites in the Lagpeltkangas-Latjineliden complex dating from 300 to 700 AD. He was an honorary member of the Finnish Archaeological Society.
