= Lanttulaatikko =

Finnish Christmas casserole dish

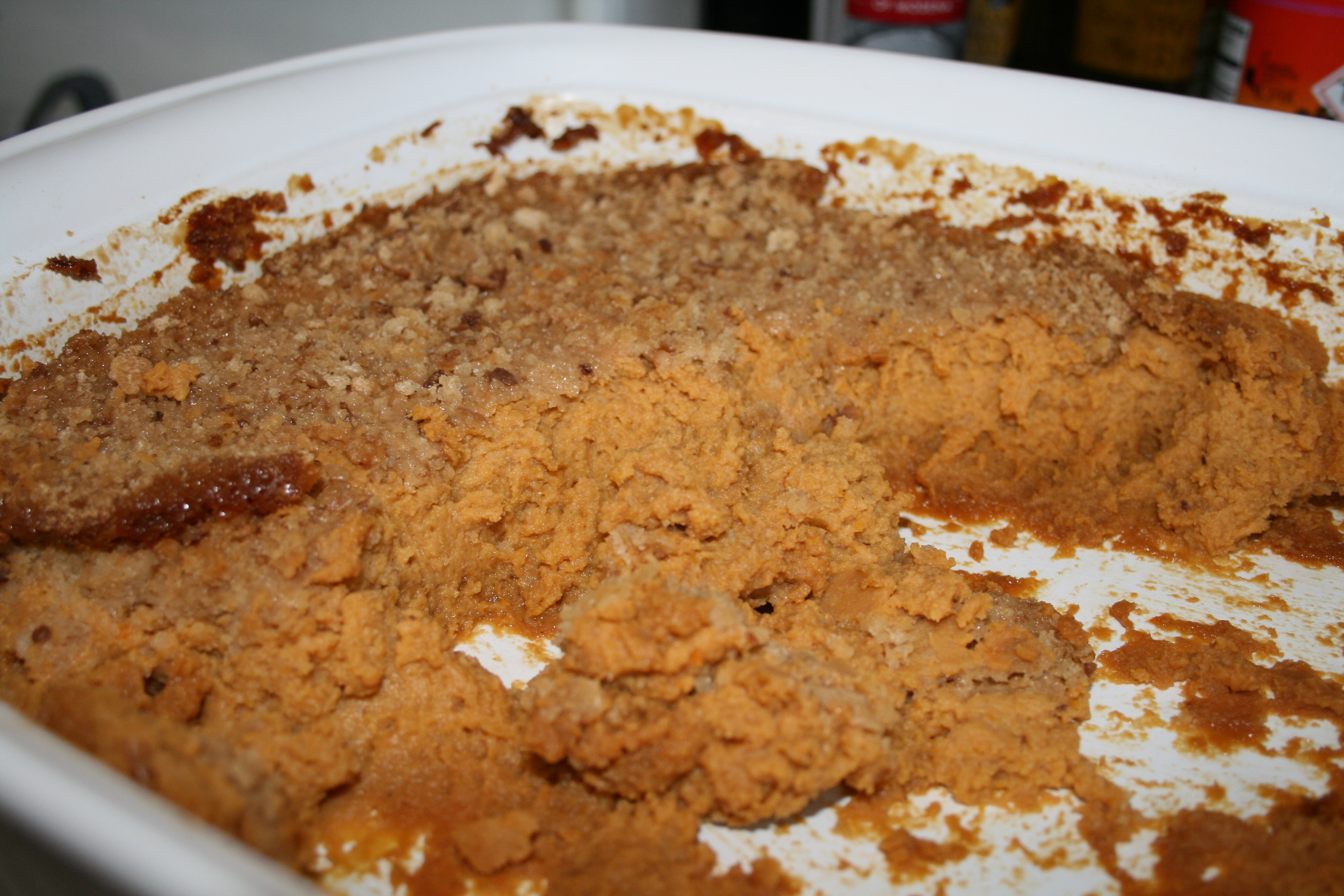
Lanttulaatikko

Lanttulaatikko or kålrotslåda (swede casserole) is a swede (rutabaga) casserole that is a traditional Christmas dish in Finland. It is usually served with other casseroles at the Christmas table as a side dish to ham, fish or other meats.

Traditional lanttulaatikko is made of boiled and mashed swede, sweetened and enriched with a mixture of bread crumbs, egg, cream, treacle, butter, and seasoned with salt and various spices (such as ginger, cinnamon and nutmeg). This mixture is placed in a casserole dish, often with a decorative pattern forked over it (or topped with more bread crumbs). The dish is then baked at 175 °C (347 °F) for an hour and a half in an oven.

== See also ==
- List of casserole dishes
- Porkkanalaatikko
- Maksalaatikko
