= Porkkanalaatikko =

Traditional Finnish dish

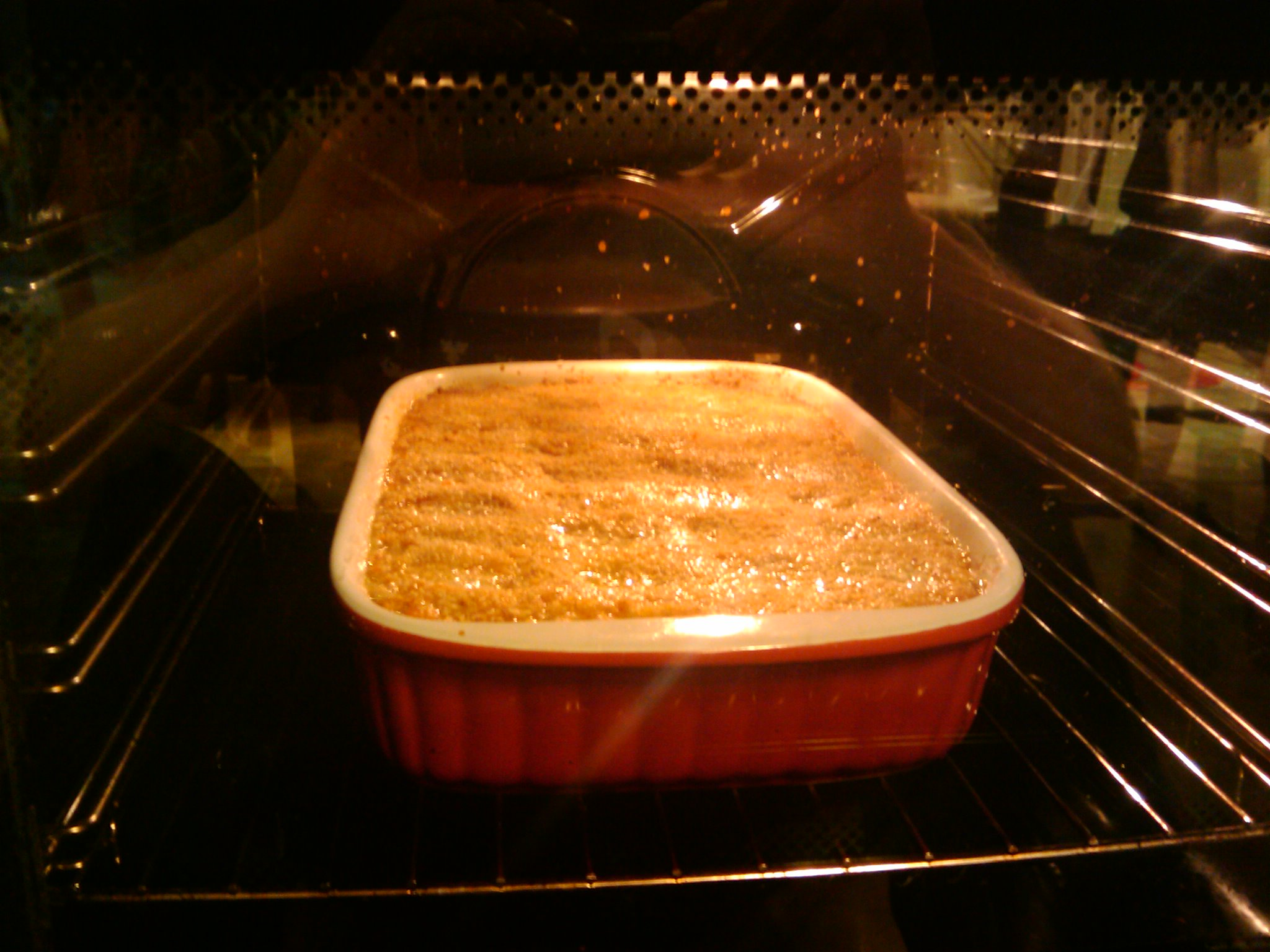
Porkkanalaatikko

Porkkanalaatikko (or, in Swedish, morotslåda, both meaning 'carrot casserole') is a traditional Finnish dish mostly eaten during Christmas.

The main ingredients are mashed carrots, mixed with boiled rice or barley, and liquid (usually milk or cream). Butter and eggs may be mixed into the mash, which may also be flavoured with sugar, salt, white pepper and grated nutmeg. The mash is put in a casserole dish and baked in the oven. The carrots need not necessarily be boiled before baking: they can be grated and mixed raw with the other ingredients. Readymade porkkanalaatikko is also sold in Finnish food stores around the Christmas season, as well as in parts of Sweden with a large ethnically Finnish population.

The dish seems to have originated in the nineteenth century.

== See also ==
- Lanttulaatikko
- List of carrot dishes
- Maksalaatikko
