= Tuomas Markkula =

Finnish footballer (born 1990)

Personal information
- Date of birth: 28 June 1990 (age 36)
- Place of birth: Finland
- Height: 1.80 m (5 ft 11 in)
- Position: Forward

Team information
- Current team: RoPS Rovaniemi

Senior career*
Years	Team	Apps	(Gls)
2008–2009	TPS Turku	1	(0)
2010–	RoPS Rovaniemi	14	(2)
- * Club domestic league appearances and goals as of 29 September 2010

Tuomas Markkula (born 28 June 1990) is a Finnish footballer, who currently plays for Finnish Ykkönen (second level) side RoPS Rovaniemi.

Previously Markkula has played in TPS Turku and in Finnish third level Kakkonen with Åbo IFK. TPS is ÅIFK's parent club.

He has represented nationally Finland in youth level.
