= Imelletty perunalaatikko =

Finnish dish

Sweetened potato casserole
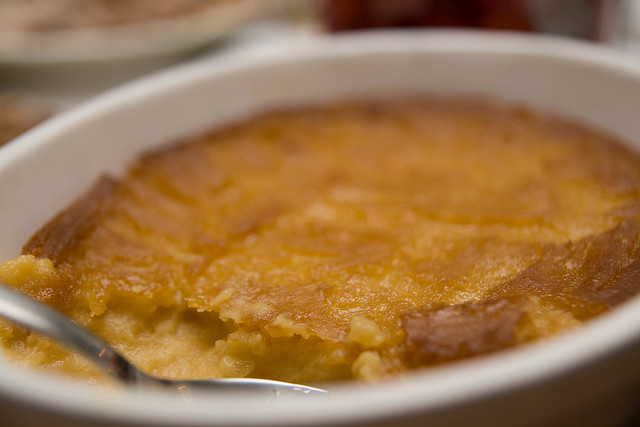
- Perunalaatikko
- Place of origin: Finland
- Region or state: Päijät-Häme
- Main ingredients: Potatoes, wheat flour, milk

Sweetened potato casserole (Finnish imelletty perunalaatikko) is a traditional Finnish dish from Päijät-Häme.

== Preparation ==
Puréed potatoes are mixed with wheat flour and allowed to stand at a temperature of around 50°C (122°F). The amylase in the flour breaks down the potato's starches into shorter carbohydrate chains, i.e. sugars. The temperature cannot exceed 75°C (167°F); otherwise, the amylase molecules will break down. Through this process, the dish gets its distinct sweet flavour; nowadays, however, it can be sweetened with dark syrup (Finnish: tumma siirappi). Dark syrup is made from sugarcane and it is the most common type of syrup in Finland. It has a similar taste to molasses, but is sweeter.

The potatoes, now with a batter-like texture, are mixed with milk and baked for several hours until thickened and caramelized on top.

== See also ==
- List of casserole dishes
- List of potato dishes
- Joulupöytä
