= Tuomas Santavuori =

Finnish ice hockey player

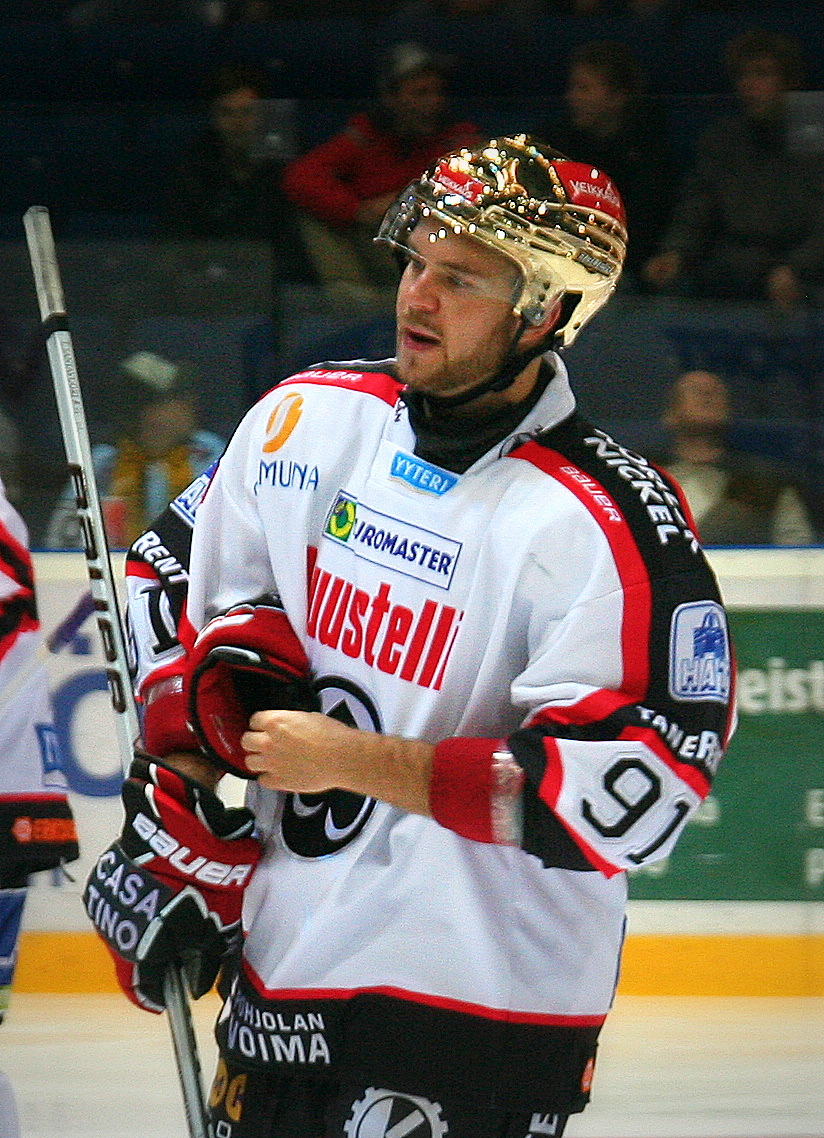
- Tuomas Santavuori
- Born: January 24, 1985 (age 40) Savonlinna, Finland
- Height: 5 ft 11 in (180 cm)
- Weight: 181 lb (82 kg; 12 st 13 lb)
- Position: Forward
- Shot: Left
- Played for: Pelicans; Ässät; HPK
- Playing career: 2003–2018

Tuomas Santavuori (born January 24, 1985) is a Finnish former professional ice hockey forward.

Santavuori played in the SM-liiga for Pelicans, Ässät and HPK.
