= Tim =

Given name most often associated with males

- Pronunciation: /ˈtɪm/ TIM
- Gender: Male
- Language: English

Origin
- Languages: 1. Greek; 2. English
- Origin: Diminutive form of Timothy
- Region of origin: English-speaking world

Other names
- Nickname: Timmy
- Related names: Timothy, Timo, Timofei, Tymish, Timotey, Timoteo, Timotheus, Tymoteusz, Timothée, Tijs, Timofey

Tim is a masculine given name. It is often short for Timothy. Tim (and its variations) is a common name in several countries.

In Glasgow, Scotland Tim is a slang term for a Catholic.

== In academia ==
- Tim Berners-Lee, English founder of the World-Wide Web
- Tim Harford, English economist author and popularizer of economics
- Tim de Zeeuw (born 1956), Dutch astronomer

== In arts and entertainment ==
- Tim Allen (born 1953), American actor
- Tim Armstrong (born 1965), American musician
- Tim Braun, percussionist for American red dirt metal ensemble Texas Hippie Coalition
- Tim Bergling, known as Avicii (1989–2018), Swedish DJ and record producer
- Tim Bowman Jr. (born 1987), American gospel musician
- Tim Brooke-Taylor (1940–2020), English actor
- Tim Buckley (1947–1975), American singer and musician
- Tim Burton (born 1958), American director
- Tim Christensen, Danish musician
- Tim Commerford, bassist for Rage Against The Machine and Audioslave
- Tim Conway (1933–2019), American actor
- Tim Curry (1946–2026), English actor
- Tim Dadabo (born 1961), American voice actor and singer
- Tim Daly (born 1956), American actor
- Tim Dever, American actor
- Tim Douglas, Canadian actor who was a cast member on the Canadian sketch comedy TV series You Can't Do That on Television
- Tim Dunigan (born 1955), American actor
- Tim Elston, Australian actor
- Tim Ferguson (born 1963), Australian comedian
- Tim Hardin, an American folk and blues musician and composer
- Tim Hart (1948–2009), English folk singer
- Tim Harding (musician), original member of Australian children's musical group Hi-5
- Tim Heidecker (born 1976), American actor
- Tim Hildebrandt, American illustrator
- Tim Holt (1919–1973), American actor
- Tim Kash, British television presenter
- Tim Key, English actor, writer and performance poet
- Tim Lagasse, American muppeteer
- Tim Longest – member of the North Carolina House of Representatives
- Tim Maddren, Australian television personality and modern member of Hi-5
- Tim Maia, stage name of Sebastião Rodrigues Maia, Brazilian singer-songwriter and businessman
- Tim Mälzer, German television chef
- Tim McGraw (born 1967), American country singer
- Tim McIlrath, Lead singer and rhythm guitarist for the American punk rock band Rise Against
- Tim Meadows (born 1961), American actor and comedian
- Tim Minchin (born 1975), Australian comedian–musician
- Tim Moore (1887–1958), American actor and comedian
- Tim O'Connor (actor) (1927–2018), American character actor
- Tim O'Kelly (1941–1990), American actor
- Tim Reynolds (born 1957), American guitarist and multi-instrumentalist
- Tim Rice, British lyricist
- Tim Robbins (born 1958), American actor
- Tim Roth, English actor
- Tim Russ (born 1956), American actor
- Tim (singer), popular K-pop solo singer
- Tim Stallworth (born 1966), American football player
- Tim Thomerson (born 1946), American actor
- Tim Urban, American musician
- Tim Van Patten (born 1959), American director, actor, screenwriter, and producer
- Tim Vine, British comedian
- Tim Westwood, British DJ and broadcaster
- Tiny Tim (musician) (Herbert Buckingham Khaury, 1932–1996), American singer, ukulele player, and musical archivist

== In politics ==
- Tim Achtermeyer (born 1993), German politician
- Tim Anderson (politician), Virginia state legislator
- Tim Farron, British politician
- Tim Hutchinson, former United States Senator from Arkansas
- Tim Johnson, former United States Senator from South Dakota
- Tim Kaine, United States Senator from Virginia
- Tim Keller (politician) (born 1977), American politician and mayor of Albuquerque
- Tim Orbos, Filipino businessman, government administrator, and politician
- Tim Pargent (born 1993), German politician
- Tim Paulson (born 1952), California labor leader
- Tim Pawlenty, former Minnesota governor
- Tim Peterson (politician), Canadian politician
- Tim Remington, American politician and pastor in Idaho
- Tim Ryan (Florida politician) (born 1956), American Democratic Party legislator and county commissioner
- Tim Ryan (Ohio politician) (born 1973), American Democratic Party legislator and 2020 presidential candidate
- Tim Ryan, alternative pseudonym of American Communist Party leader Eugene Dennis (1905–1961)
- Tim Scott, United States Senator from South Carolina
- Tim Sheehy, United States Senator from Montana
- Tim Smith, member of the Victorian Legislative Assembly
- Tim Teßmann (born 1989), German politician
- Tim Walz, current governor of Minnesota
- Tim Wilson, Australian federal politician

== In sports ==
=== In American football ===
- Tim Biakabutuka, NFL player
- Tim Bowens, NFL player
- Tim Boyle, American football player
- Tim Couch, NFL player
- Tim Cowan, American football player
- Tim Daniel, American football player
- Tim DeMorat, NFL player
- Tim Gilligan, American football player
- Tim Gray, NFL player
- Tim Grunhard, NFL player
- Tim Hasselbeck, NFL player
- Tim Hightower, NFL player
- Tim Jennings, NFL player
- Tim Keenan III, college football player
- Tim Krumrie, NFL player
- Tim Levcik, American football player
- Tim Payne (footballer) (born 1994), New Zealand footballer
- Tim Payne (rugby union) (born 1979), rugby player
- Tim Riordan, American football player
- Tim Settle, American football player
- Tim Simpson, American football player
- Tim Skipper, American football player and coach
- Tim Stallworth, NFL player
- Tim Tebow, American football player
- Tim Williams, American football player
- Tim Wilson (American football) (1954–1996), American football running back

=== In baseball ===
- Tim Atherton, Australian baseball player
- Tim Belcher, MLB player
- Tim Elko, MLB player
- Tim Foli, MLB player
- Tim Herrin, MLB player
- Tim Hudson, American baseball player
- Tim Kennelly, Australian professional baseball player
- Tim Lincecum, American baseball player
- Tim Lopes (baseball), American baseball infielder
- Tim McCarver, MLB player & broadcaster
- Tim Murnane, MLB player & sportswriter
- Tim Peterson (baseball), American former professional baseball pitcher
- Tim Raines, MLB player
- Tim Salmon, MLB player
- Tim Wakefield, American baseball player
- Tim Wallach, MLB player

=== In basketball ===
- Tim Cone, American basketball coach for the Philippine Basketball Association
- Tim Duncan, American basketball coach and player
- Tim Floyd, American basketball coach
- Tim Frick, Canadian wheelchair basketball coach
- Tim Hardaway, American basketball player
- Tim Hardaway Jr., American basketball player
- Tim Legler, American basketball player and commentator
- Tim Soares (born 1997), American-Brazilian basketball player for Ironi Ness Ziona of the Israeli Basketball Premier League
- Tim Thomas, American basketball player

=== In football (soccer) ===
- Tim Borowski, German footballer
- Tim Cahill, Australian soccer player
- Tim de Cler (born 1978), Dutch footballer
- Tim DiBisceglie, American soccer player
- Tim Flowers, English footballer
- Tim Hoogland, German footballer
- Tim Howard, American soccer player
- Tim Krul (born 1988), Dutch footballer
- Tim Lemperle (born 2002), German footballer
- Tim Matavž (born 1989), Slovenian footballer
- Tim Petersen (born 1986), German footballer
- Tim Ream, American soccer player
- Tim Sherwood, English footballer
- Tim Spycher, Swiss footballer
- Tim Väyrynen (born 1993), Finnish footballer
- Tim Wiese, German footballer
- Tim Wulff (born 1987), German footballer
- Tim, Brazilian footballer and manager

=== In rugby ===
- Tim Browne, Australian Rugby League player
- Tim Grant (rugby league), Australian Rugby League player
- Tim Lafai, Samoan Rugby League player
- Tim Mannah, Australian Rugby League player
- Tim Moltzen, Australian Rugby League player
- Tim Simona, New Zealand Rugby League player
- Tim Visser (born 1987), Dutch rugby union player

=== In hockey ===
- Tim Armstrong (ice hockey) (born 1967), Canadian retired professional ice hockey player
- Tim Brent, NHL player
- Tim Conboy, NHL player
- Tim Connolly, NHL player
- Tim Ecclestone, NHL player
- Tim Gleason, NHL player
- Tim Horton, NHL player
- Tim Jackman, NHL player
- Tim Kennedy (ice hockey), NHL player
- Tim Kerr, NHL player
- Tim Sestito, NHL player
- Tim Stützle, NHL player
- Tim Thomas (ice hockey, born 1974), NHL player
- Tim Wallace, NHL player
- Tim Young (ice hockey), NHL player

=== In cricket ===
- Tim Bresnan, English cricketer
- Tim May, Australian cricketer
- Tim Munton, English cricketer
- Tim Paine, Australian cricketer
- Tim Ravenscroft, Guernsey cricketer
- Tim Robinson, English cricketer
- Tim Southee, New Zealand cricketer
- Tim Zoehrer, Australian cricketer

=== In other sports ===
- Tim Anderson (athlete) (1925–2017), British former pole vaulter
- Tim Arson (1976–2015), American professional wrestler
- Tim Catalfo (born 1959), American former amateur and Mixed Martial Arts fighter
- Tim Celen (born 1998), Belgian para-cyclist
- Tim Clark (jockey) (born 1986), horse racing jockey
- Tim DeBoom, Ironman triathlete
- Tim Don, Triathlete
- Tim Gould, Mountain Bike racer
- Tim Henman, English tennis player
- Tim Horner (born 1959), American retired professional wrestler
- Tim Hunt (died 2014), American professional wrestler
- Tim Mayotte, American tennis player
- Tim Means (born 1984), American professional mixed martial artist
- Tim Janus, American competitive eater
- Tim Peterson (swimmer) (born 1978), Canadian former swimmer
- Tim Silvia, Mixed Martial Arts fighter
- Tim Storm (rower) (born 1956), Canadian rower
- Tim Storm (born 1964), American professional wrestler
- Tim Tramnitz (born 2004), German racing driver
- Tim Veldt (born 1984), Dutch track cyclist
- Tim de Vries (born 1978), Dutch para-cyclist
- Tim Wellens (born 1991), Belgian racing cyclist
- Tim White (wrestling), wrestling referee
- Tim Williamson (racing driver) (1956–1980), American racing driver
- Tim Wilson (canoeist), Australian canoeist
- Tim Wood, American figure skater

== Other ==
- Tim, better known as Oldenburg Baby, an aborted child that survived
- Tim Berners-Lee, inventor of the World Wide Web
- Tim Cook, CEO of Apple Inc.
- Tim Dorsey, American crime novelist
- Timothy "Tim" Doner (born 1995), American polyglot and foreign policy analyst
- Tim Foecke, metallurgist
- Tim Gunn, television personality
- Tim Keller (pastor) (1950–2023), American Christian pastor, author and speaker
- Tim Krabbé (born 1943), Dutch journalist, novelist and chess writer
- Tim Kretschmer, German mass murderer
- Tim Kurkjian, Baseball writer and analyst
- Tim LaHaye, American author and evangelical minister
- Tim Lopes (journalist), Brazilian investigative journalist and producer
- Tim Mudde, Dutch rightist
- Tim Orr (born 1968), American cinematographer
- Tim Russert, American news anchor
- Tim Ryan (sportscaster), American sportscaster
- Tim Steiner (businessman) (born 1969), British businessman, CEO of Ocado

== Fictional characters ==
- Old Tim the Ice Moose, a character from the Playhouse Disney animated show PB&J Otter
- Tim from the Petronix Defenders
- Tim, a character from the film Robots
- TIM, a computer from The Tomorrow People
- Tim the Bear, a character from The Cleveland Show
- Tim the Beaver, the mascot of the Massachusetts Institute of Technology
- Tim Bisley, a character in the television series Spaced
- Tim Canterbury, a character from The Office
- Tim Carpenter, a character in Final Destination 2
- Tim Delaney, a character in the Netflix series Grand Army
- Tim Drake, the third character to go by the name of "Robin" in DC Comics
- Tim Flaherty, a character from Ghost Whisperer
- Tim Lockwood, supporting character in Cloudy with a Chance of Meatballs and its sequel
- Tim McManus, a character from Oz
- Tim Okazaki, a character in Angry Boys
- Tim Riggins, a character from Friday Night Lights
- Tim Rimmer, a character in the Pixar film Cars
- Tim Ryan (Blue Heelers), portrayed by Grant Piro in 1998–99 on Australian TV series Blue Heelers
- Tim Speedle, a character in CSI: Miami
- Tim Stoker, a character in The Magnus Archives
- Tim Taylor, a character in Home Improvement
- Tim the Enchanter, a character from the film Monty Python and the Holy Grail
- "Tiny" Tim Cratchit, a character from Charles Dickens' A Christmas Carol
- Tinny Tim, a character in Futurama
- Twitchy Tim, a character in Ninjago
- Tim, a character from The Magic School Bus
- Tim, the title character from the adult animated sitcom The Life & Times of Tim
- Tim, a character from BrainPop
- Mountain Tim, a supporting character in Steel Ball Run, a story arc of the Japanese manga series Jojo's Bizarre Adventure

== Disambiguations ==
- Tim Anderson (disambiguation), multiple people
- Tim Dillon (disambiguation), multiple people
- Tim Harris (disambiguation), multiple people
- Tim Hunter (disambiguation), multiple people
- Tim Peters (disambiguation), multiple people
- Tim Peterson (disambiguation), multiple people
- Tim Ryan (disambiguation), multiple people
- Tim Ward (disambiguation), multiple people
- Tim Wheeler (disambiguation), multiple people
- Tim Williams (disambiguation), multiple people
- Tim Wilson (disambiguation), multiple people

== See also ==
- Tymek
