= Timothy =

Timothy is a masculine name. It comes from the Greek name Τιμόθεος (Timόtheos) meaning "honouring God", "in God's honour", or "honoured by God". Timothy (and its variations) is a common name in several countries.

== People ==
=== Given name ===
- Timothy (given name), including a list of people with the name
- Tim
- Timmy
- Timo
- Timotheus
- Timothée
- Timoteo (given name)

=== Surname ===
- Bankole Timothy (1923–1994), Sierra Leonean journalist
- Christopher Timothy (born 1940), Welsh actor
- Miriam Timothy (1879–1950), British harpist
- Nick Timothy (born 1980), British political adviser

=== Mononym ===
- Saint Timothy, a companion and co-worker of Paul the Apostle
- Timothy I (Nestorian patriarch)

== Education ==
- Timothy Christian School (Illinois), a school system in Elmhurst, Illinois
- Timothy Christian School (New Jersey), a school in Piscataway, New Jersey

== Arts and entertainment ==
- "Timothy" (song), a 1970 song by The Buoys
- Timothy Goes to School, a Canadian-Chinese children's animated series
- Timothy (TV film), a 2014 Australian television comedy
- Timothy Turtle, a 1946 picture book by Al Graham
- The Adventures of Timothy Pilgrim, a 1975 Canadian children's television program

== Places ==
- Timothy, Tennessee, an unincorporated town in Overton County, Tennessee
- Chief Timothy State Park, a former state park in Asotin County, Washington

== Other uses ==
- Timothy-grass, a type of grass
- Timothy (tortoise), a tortoise in the UK
- First Timothy and Second Timothy, Pauline epistles from the New Testament of the Christian Bible.

== See also ==
- Tim (disambiguation)
- Timoti
- Timati (born 1983), a Russian recording artist and entrepreneur
- Tymoshenko, a Ukrainian surname derived from the name Timothy
- Acts of Timothy, an Apocryphal work regarding Saint Timothy
