= Timo =

Given name most often associated with males

- Gender: male

Origin
- Origin: Greek name Τιμάω
- Meaning: "to honour" or "to esteem"

Other names
- Nicknames: Timmy, Timbo, Tim
- Related names: Tim, Timothy, Timofei, Timon, Tymish, Timotey, Timoteo, Timotheus, Tymoteusz, Timothée, Tijs

Timo is a masculine given name. It is primarily used in Finnish, Estonian, Dutch, and German societies.

== Arts and entertainment ==
- Timo Alakotila (born 1959), Finnish musician
- Timo Andres (born 1985), American composer and pianist
- Timo Blunck (born 1962), German musician
- Timo Boll (born 1981), German table tennis player
- Timo Bortolotti (1889–1951), Italian sculptor
- Timo Brunke (born 1972), German slam poet
- Timo Descamps (born 1986), Belgian actor and musician
- Timo Ellis (born 1970), American musician and record producer
- Timo Pieni Huijaus (born 1982), a Finnish rapper
- Timo Jurkka (born 1963), Finnish actor
- Timo Kahilainen (born 1963), Finnish actor
- Timo Kahlen (born 1966), German sound sculptor and media artist
- Timo Kojo (born 1953), Finnish singer
- Timo Koivusalo (born 1963), Finnish actor, writer, and musician
- Timo Korhonen (born 1964), Finnish classical guitarist
- Timo Koskinen (born 1965), Finnish classical pianist
- Timo Kotipelto (born 1969), Finnish metal singer
- Timo Lavikainen (born 1972), Finnish actor
- Timo Maas (born 1969), German electronic musician and DJ
- Timo K. Mukka (1944–1973), Finnish novelist
- Timmo Niesner (born 1971), German actor
- Timo Parvela (born 1964), Finnish children's writer
- Timo Räisänen (born 1979), Swedish musician
- Timo Rautiainen (musician) (born 1963), Finnish metal singer
- Timo Rose (born 1977), German filmmaker and rapper
- Timo Salminen (born 1952), Finnish cinematographer
- Timo Tjahjanto (born 1980), Indonesian film director, producer, and screenwriter
- Timo Tolkki (born 1966), Finnish metal musician
- Timo Toots (born 1982), Estonian artist
- Timo Torikka (born 1958), Finnish actor
- Timo Vuorensola (born 1979), Finnish film director and actor

== Politics and government ==
- Timo (fl. 834), Bavarian count, subject of the Song of Count Timo
- Timo Angelov (1882–1903), Macedonian revolutionary
- Timo Kalli (born 1947), Finnish politician
- Timo Laaninen (born 1954), Finnish politician
- Timo Soini (born 1962), Finnish politician
- Timo Vornanen (born 1969), Finnish politician

== Science and academia ==
- Timo Airaksinen (born 1947), Finnish philosopher
- Timo Hannay (born 1968), English science writer and businessman
- Timo Honkela (born 1962), Finnish information scientist
- Timo Joensuu (born 1957), Finnish oncologist
- Timo Kivimäki (born 1962), Finnish political scientist
- Timo Maran (born 1975), Estonian biosemiotician and poet
- Timo Meynhardt (born 1972), German psychologist and business economist
- Timo Penttilä (1931–2011), Finnish architect
- Timo Santalainen (born 1946), Finnish business professor and consultant
- Timo Penttilä (1926–2006), Finnish designer, sculptor, and professor
- Timo Sirainen (born 1979), Finnish programmer and scientist
- Timo Teräsvirta (born 1941), Finnish economist
- Timo Vihavainen (born 1947), Finnish historian and professor of Russian studies

== Sports ==
=== Association football ===
- Timo Achenbach (born 1982), German defender
- Timo Askolin (born 1951), Finnish manager
- Timo Baumgartl (born 1996), German defender
- Timo Beermann (born 1990), German defender
- Timo Brauer (born 1990), German midfielder
- Timo Çeçen (born 1994), German midfielder
- Timo Furuholm (born 1987), Finnish forward
- Timo Gebhart (born 1989), German midfielder
- Timo Hammel (born 1987), German goalkeeper
- Timo Heinze (born 1986), German defender
- Timo Hildebrand (born 1979), German goalkeeper
- Timo Horn (born 1993), German goalkeeper
- Timo Hübers (born 1996), German defender
- Timo Jansink (born 2003), Dutch footballer
- Timo Kautonen (1945–2026), Finnish footballer
- Timo Kern (born 1990), German midfielder
- Timo Kunert (born 1987), German midfielder
- Timo Lange (born 1968), German midfielder and coach
- Timo Letschert (born 1993), Dutch defender
- Timo Liekoski (born 1942), Finnish goalkeeper and coach
- Timo Nagy (born 1983), German midfielder
- Timo Nummelin (born 1948), Finnish footballer and ice hockey player
- Timo Ochs (born 1981), German goalkeeper
- Timo Perthel (born 1989), German wing-back
- Timo Plattel (born 1994), Dutch goalkeeper
- Timo Reus (born 1974), German goalkeeper
- Timo Rost (born 1978), German midfielder
- Timo Röttger (born 1985), German winger
- Timo Scheunemann (born 1973), Indonesian-born German forward and manager
- Timo Schultz (born 1977), German midfielder and coach
- Timo Staffeldt (born 1984), German midfielder
- Timo Uster (born 1974), Gambian defender
- Timo Wenzel (born 1977), German defender
- Timo Werner (born 1996), German forward
- Timo Zahnleiter (born 1948), German midfielder and manager

=== Ice hockey ===
- Timo Ahmaoja (born 1978), Finnish defenseman
- Timo Blomqvist (born 1961), Finnish defenseman
- Timo Helbling (born 1981), Swiss defenseman
- Timo Hirvonen (1973-2023), Finnish winger
- Timo Jutila (born 1963), Finnish defenseman
- Timo Koskela (born 1979), Finnish winger
- Timo Lahtinen (born 1947), Finnish player and coach
- Timo Lindström (born 1986), Finnish goaltender
- Timo Meier (born 1996), Swiss winger
- Timo Nummelin (born 1948), Finnish footballer and ice hockey player
- Timo Pärssinen (born 1977), Finnish forward
- Timo Pielmeier (born 1989), German goaltender
- Timo Salo (born 1985), Finnish forward
- Timo Seppänen (born 1987), Finnish defenseman
- Timo Susi (born 1959), Finnish player
- Timo Sutinen (born 1949), Finnish player
- Timo Turunen (born 1948), Finnish center

=== Motorsports ===
- Timo Bernhard (born 1981), German racing driver
- Timo Glock (born 1982), German racing driver
- Timo Gottschalk (born 1974), German rally navigator
- Timo Lienemann (born 1985), German racing driver
- Timo Mäkinen (1938–2017), Finnish rally driver
- Timo Rautiainen (born 1964), Finnish rally driver
- Timo Salonen (born 1951), Finnish rally driver
- Timo Scheider (born 1978), German racing driver

=== Other sports ===
- Timo Aaltonen (born 1969), Finnish shot putter
- Timo Antila (born 1980), Finnish biathlete
- Timo André Bakken (born 1989), Norwegian cross-country skier
- Timo Boll (born 1981), German table tennis player
- Timo Eichfuss (born 1988), Estonian basketball player
- Timo Grönlund (1954–2022), Finnish sprint canoer
- Timo Hoffmann (born 1974), German boxer
- Timo Karppinen (born 1967), Finnish orienteer
- Timo Kuusisto (born 1959), Finnish pole vaulter
- Timo Lumme (born 1961), Finnish International Olympic Committee employee
- Timo Murama (1913–1981), Finnish Nordic combined skier
- Timo Nieminen (born 1981), Finnish tennis player
- Timo Peltola (born 1972), Finnish judoka
- Timo Pérez (born 1975), Dominican Republic baseball player
- Timo Roosen (born 1993), Dutch cyclist
- Timo Saarelainen (born 1960), Finnish basketball player
- Timo Sild (born 1988), Estonian orienteer
- Timo Simonlatser (born 1986), Estonian cross-country skier
- Timo Tammemaa (born 1991), Estonian volleyball player
- Timo Tompuri (born 1969), Finnish discus thrower
- Timo Trummer (born 1996), German slalom canoeist
- Timo Weß (born 1982), German field hockey player

== Other ==
- Timo Saarnio (born 1944), Finnish interior architect and furniture designer
- Tim Weiland, American fashion designer also known as Timo
- Rick Timmo (born 1947), New Zealand motorcycle racer

== People nicknamed Timo ==
- Tim Anderson (RAF officer) (born 1957)
- Friedhelm Konietzka (1938–2012), German football striker and manager

== Fictional characters ==
- Timo Mendes, from the German soap opera Verbotene Liebe

== See also ==
- Timothy (given name)
- Tymek
- Tymon
- Timotheus
- Timothée
- Timoteo (given name)
- Timofey
- Tymek
