= Timofeyev =

Timofeyev (Russian: Тимофе́ев; masculine) or Timofeyeva (Тимофе́ева; feminine) is a common Russian surname derived from the male given name Timofey. The surname literally means "belonging to Timofey". It is shared by the following people:

- Alexey Timofeev (born 1991), Russian curler
- Anatoly Timofeyev (1887–1985), Russian fencer
- Andrei Timofeyev (born 1996), Russian football player
- Anna Timofeeva (born 1987), Russian water polo player
- Anna Timofeyeva (ice hockey) (born 1996), Russian ice hockey player
- Artyom Timofeev (chess player) (born 1985), Russian chess player
- Artyom Timofeyev (footballer) (born 1994), Russian association football player
- Avdotia Timofeyeva (1739–?), Russian ballet dancer
- Ermak Timofeev (1532–1585), Cossack ataman, hero in Russian folklore and myths
- Evgeniy Timofeev (born 1994), alpine skier from Kyrgyzstan
- Irina Timofeyeva (born 1970), Russian long-distance runner
- Kristina Timofeeva (born 1993), Russian archer
- Lev Timofeev (born 1936), Russian economist, political commentator and novelist
- Lidija Timofejeva (1906–1991), Serbian chess player of Russian origin
- Maria Timofeeva (born 2003), Russian tennis player
- Marina Timofeieva (born 1984), Estonian ice dancer
- Nikolay Timofeev-Ressovsky (1900–1981), Soviet biologist
- Nina Timofeeva (1935–2014), Russian ballet dancer
- Oleg Timofeyev (born 1963), American musicologist and musician
- Olga Timofeeva (born 1977), deputy for the United Russia party, former journalist
- Sergei Timofeyev (footballer, born 1981), Russian former football player
- Sergei Vasilyevich Timofeyev (1970–1997), Russian professional association footballer
- Sergey Timofeev (born 1965), Kazakh association football player
- Sergey Timofeyev (1950–2021), Soviet wrestler
- Valentina Timofeyeva (born 1937), Soviet rower (coxswain)
- Valeri Timofeev (1941–2014), Latvian artist
- Vitali Timofeyev (born 1982), Russian association football player
- Yulia Timofeeva (born 1972), Russian bobsledder
- Yekaterina Mulyuk-Timofeyeva (born 1976), Belarusian archer
- Yevgeniya Timofeeva (1911–1992), pilot in the Soviet Air Force, the first woman to fly the Pe-2
- Yulia Timofeeva (born 1972), Russian former track and field sprinter and bobsledder
