= Timmy =

Given name most often associated with males

- Pronunciation: /ˈtɪməθi/
- Gender: male

Origin
- Origin: Greek name Τιμόθεος
- Meaning: "Honouring God" or "Honoured by God"

Other names
- Nicknames: Timo, Timbo, Thomas
- Related names: Tim, Timothy, Timo, Timofei, Tymish, Timotey, Timoteo, Timotheus, Tymoteusz, Timothée, Tijs

Timmy is a masculine name. It is often short for Timothy. This variation is popular as a nickname and is commonly used when someone is young, but it is also used in adulthood. It is a version of the Greek name Τιμόθεος (Timόtheos).

Variant spellings include Timmie and Timme.

== People ==
- Timmy Allen (born 2000), American basketball player
- Timmy Chang (born 1981), American college football coach and former quarterback
- Timmy Chipeco (born 1975), Filipino politician
- Timmy Dooley (born 1969), Irish politician
- Timmy Duggan (born 1982), American road racing cyclist
- Timmy Fitzpatrick, Irish hurling goalkeeper of the 1940s
- Timmy Hammersley (born 1987), Irish hurler
- Timmy Hansen (born 1992), Swedish rallycross driver
- Timmy Hill (born 1993), American stock car racing driver
- Timmy Horne (born 1997), American football player
- Timmy Jernigan (born 1992), American National Football League player
- Timmy Kelleher (born 1970), Irish hurler
- Timmy Mallett (born 1955), English TV presenter, broadcaster and artist
- Timmy Matley, lead singer of the British group the Overtones
- Timmy Murphy (born 1974), Irish jockey
- Timmy O'Dowd (born 1963), Irish Gaelic footballer
- Timmy Payungka Tjapangati (c. 1942–2000), Australian Aboriginal artist
- Timmy Pettersson (born 1977), Swedish ice hockey player
- Timmy Simons (born 1976), Belgian footballer
- Timmy Smith (born 1964), American National Football League player
- Timmy Thiele (born 1991), German footballer
- Timmy Thomas (1944–2022), American R&B singer, keyboardist, songwriter and record producer
- Timmy Trumpet, stage name of Australian house DJ and producer Timothy Jude Smith
- Timmy Williams (born 1981), American comedian and member of The Whitest Kids U' Know
- Timmy Yip (born 1967), Hong Kong film art director and designer

== Fictional characters ==
- Timmy, a dog from The Famous Five series by Enid Blyton
- Timmy, a large green monster on The Muppet Show
- Timmy, a lamb from the animated television series Shaun the Sheep and its spin-off Timmy Time
- Timmy Baterman, a fictional character from Stephen King's novel Pet Semetary
- Timmy Brisby, a young mouse in the 1982 film adaptation The Secret of NIMH
- Timmy Burch, a character from South Park
- Timmy Martin, the boy who owns the dog Lassie in the long-running TV series Lassie
- The Adventures of Timmy the Tooth, animated children's TV character
- Timmy Turner, from the animated television series The Fairly OddParents
- Timmy, an evil twin of Crow T. Robot from episode 416 of Mystery Science Theater 3000

== Animals ==
- Timmy (gorilla) (1959–2011), a longtime resident of the Cleveland Metroparks Zoo.
- Timmy (whale), a humpback whale that strayed into the Baltic Sea in early 2026

== See also ==
- Timmie, given name
- Timme, given name and surname
- Timothy
- Tim
- Timo
- Timotheus
- Timothée
- Timofey
- Timothy (disambiguation)
- Tim (disambiguation)
- Timoti
- Tymek
