= Tymek =

Tymek is a Polish-language diminutive of the given name Tymoteusz, or Timothy (given name). It can be both a given name and a surname. Notable persons with this name include:

- Jadwiga Tymek (1919-1944), Polish World War II resistance fighter.
- Tymek (rapper) (Tymoteusz Bucki) (born 1994), Polish rapper.
- Tymek Kucharczyk (born 2006), Polish racing driver.
- A sorcerer's apprentice from the Polish comics Tymek i Mistrz

== See also ==
- Timothy (given name)
- Tymon
- Timotheus
- Timothée
- Timoteo (given name)
- Timofey
