= Tymchenko =

Tymchenko (Ukrainian: Тимченко) is a Ukrainian surname. It derives from the Christian name Timothy, and its Ukrainian variant, Tymofiy (Ukrainian: Тимофій). The surname, Tymchenko, was created by adding the Ukrainian patronymic suffix, -enko, meaning someone of Tymofiy, usually the son of Tymofiy. It may refer to the following individuals:

- Ihor Tymchenko (born 1986), Ukrainian footballer
- Ivan Tymchenko (1939–2020), Ukrainian jurist, chairman of the Constitutional Court between 1996 and 1999
- Maksym Tymchenko (born 1975), senior executive in Ukraine
- Oleksiy Tymchenko (born 1985), Ukrainian footballer
- Roksana Tymchenko (born 1991), Ukrainian alpine skier
- Yevhen Tymchenko (1866–1948), Ukrainian linguist

== See also ==
- Timchenko
- Tymoshenko
- Tymoschuk
- Tymchuk
