= Timchenko =

Timchenko is a gender-neutral Slavic surname originating from the given name Timofey. Notable people with the surname include:

- Dimitriy Timchenko (born 1983), Ukrainian Greco-Roman wrestler
- Galina Timchenko (born 1962), Russian journalist
- Gennady Timchenko (born 1952), businessman, active in the energy trading
- Ilona Timchenko (born 1976), Russian pianist and composer
- Oleg Timchenko, contemporary painter and founder of the “10th Floor Group”
- Stanislav Timchenko (born 1983), Russian figure skater
- Sergei Timchenko (born 1972), Ukrainian politician and sportsman
- Vyacheslav Timchenko (disambiguation) – several people

== See also ==
- Tymchenko
