= Sergei Timofeyev =

Sergei Timofeyev may refer to:

- Sergey Timofeyev (1950-2021), Soviet Russian wrestler
- Sergey Timofeev (born 1965), Kazakhstani football manager and former defender
- Sergei Timofeyev (footballer, born 1970), Russian football midfielder/forward
- Sergei Timofeyev (footballer, born 1981), Russian football defender
