= Thijs =

Thijs is a common Dutch given name and surname. It is a short form of Matthijs (Dutch form of Matthew) or Timothijs or Timotheus (Dutch forms of Timothy). The ij is pronounced [ɛi].

Some notable people with this name are:

== Given name ==
- Thijs Al (born 1980), Dutch mountain biker
- Thijs Berman (born 1957), Dutch politician
- Thijs Libregts (born 1941), Dutch football coach
- Thijs Maris (1839–1917), Dutch painter, etcher and lithographer
- Thijs van Leer (born 1948), Dutch singer-songwriter, composer and producer, lead singer, flautist and keyboardist with the band Focus
- Thijs Westbroek (born 1995), Dutch DJ and producer
- Thijs de Vlieger, Dutch DJ and producer, member of the trio Noisia
- Thijs Zonneveld (born 1980), Dutch journalist and a retired cyclist
- All articles beginning with Thijs

== Surname ==
- Bernd Thijs (born 1978), Belgian footballer
- Erika Thijs (1960–2011), Belgian politician
- Erwin Thijs (born 1970), Belgian road bicycle racer
- Jan Thijs (Johannes Thysius) (1621–1653), Dutch book collector
- Jim Thijs (born 1980), Belgian triathlete
- Lutgarde Thijs (born 1962), Belgian sprint canoeist
- Paul Thys (born 1946), Belgian long-distance runner
- Pieter Thijs (1624–1677), Flemish painter

== See also ==
- Tijs, an even shorter Dutch form of Matthew
- Thys, spelling variant, common in the Belgian province of Antwerp
- Thijs is one of the first two satellites of the Galileo global navigation satellite system, named after a Belgian boy who won a drawing competition
