= Timotej =

Timotej (Тимотеј in Macedonian) is a masculine given name. It is the Slovene, Macedonian, and Slovak form of Timothy.

Notable people with the name include:

- Timotej of Debar and Kichevo (1951–2024), Macedonian metropolitan
- Timotej Dodlek (born 1989), Slovenian footballer
- Timotej Hranica (born 2005), Slovak footballer
- Timotej Jambor (born 2003), Slovak footballer
- Timotej Kudlička (born 2003), Slovak footballer
- Timotej Múdry (born 2000), Slovak footballer
- Timotej Šille (born 1995), Slovak ice hockey player
- Timotej Záhumenský (born 1995), Slovak footballer

== See also ==
- Timothy
- Timote
- Timoteij
