= Tymoteusz =

Polish masculine given name

- Pronunciation: Polish: [tɨmɔˈtɛuʂ]
- Gender: Male
- Language: Polish
- Name day: 24 January, 26 January, 21 May, 22 August, 19 December

Origin
- Origin: Greek Τιμόθεος (Timótheos), via Latin Timotheus
- Meaning: "Honouring God"
- Region of origin: Poland

Other names
- Variant forms: Timothy, Timotheus, Timothée, Timoteo, Timofey, Timotej, Tymish
- Nicknames: Tymek, Tymuś, Tymo
- Related names: Tymon

Tymoteusz is the Polish form of the masculine given name Timothy. It derives, through Latin Timotheus, from the Greek name Τιμόθεος (Timótheos), meaning 'one who honours God', from τιμή (timḗ) 'honour' and θεός (theós) 'god'.

The name entered Polish usage through the Christian tradition, from Saint Timothy, the companion of Paul the Apostle and first bishop of Ephesus, to whom the First and Second Epistle to Timothy are addressed. Common Polish diminutives include Tymek, Tymuś and Tymo.

== Individuals named Tymoteusz ==
=== Religious figures ===
- Tymoteusz Paweł Gorzeński, Bishop of Poznań, Archbishop of Gniezno and Primate of Poland.
- Tymoteusz (Szretter), Metropolitan of Warsaw and All Poland in the Polish Orthodox Church.

=== Artists ===
- Timothee Adamowski (1858–1943), Polish-born American violinist, composer and conductor.
- Tymoteusz Karpowicz (1921–2005), Polish-American poet and playwright.
- Tymoteusz Bies, Polish pianist and composer.
- Tymoteusz Rożynek, Polish rapper and actor.

=== Athletes ===
- Tymoteusz Puchacz, Polish footballer.
- Tymoteusz Klupś, Polish footballer.
- Tymoteusz Zimny, Polish sprinter.
- Tymek Kucharczyk, Polish race car driver.

=== Academics ===
- Tymoteusz Lipiński, Polish historian.
- Tymoteusz Łuniewski (1847–1905), Polish writer and historian.

=== Fictional characters ===
- Tymoteusz Rymcimci, a teddy bear and the title character of the puppet play by Jan Wilkowski.

== See also ==
- Timothy (given name)
- Tymek
- Tymon
- Timotheus
- Timothée
- Timoteo (given name)
- Timofey
- Tymek
