= Lumme =

Lumme may refer to:

- Antero Lumme (1934–2016), Finnish racing cyclist
- Jyrki Lumme (born 1966), Finnish ice hockey player
- Sonja Lumme (born 1961), Finnish singer
- Timo Lumme (born 1961), Finnish Managing Director of the IOC television and Marketing Services of the International Olympic Committee (IOC)

== Others ==
- 2600 Lumme, a minor planet

== See also ==
- Lum (disambiguation)
- Lummer (disambiguation)
