= Tim (disambiguation) =

Tim is a masculine given name.

Tim or TIM may also refer to:

== Arts and entertainment ==
- Tim (Avicii album), a 2019 album by Avicii
- Tim (The Replacements album), a 1985 album by The Replacements
- Tim (film), a 1979 Australian film
- T.I.M. (film), a British 2023 science fiction film
- Tim (novel), a 1974 novel by Colleen McCullough
- TIM Defender of the Earth, a 2008 young adult science fiction novel by Sam Enthoven
- TIM (comedy duo), a Japanese comedy unit
- Treasure Island Media (TIM), a gay pornographic studio
- The Incredible Machine (series), a video game series
- Televisão Independente de Moçambique, a defunct Mozambian television channel
- TiM, Russian abbreviation for the Vsevolod Meyerhold State Theatre, Russia

== Places ==
- Tim, Denmark
- Tim (inhabited locality), several inhabited localities in Russia
- Tim River in northeastern Ontario, Canada

== Science and technology ==
=== Biology and chemistry ===
- HAVCR1 (Hepatitis A virus cellular receptor 1), also known as T-cell immunoglobulin and mucin-domain 1 (TIM-1)
- HAVCR2 (Hepatitis A virus cellular receptor 2), also known as T-cell immunoglobulin and mucin-domain containing-3 (TIM-3)
- Triosephosphate isomerase
- TIM (psychedelics) (thioisomescaline), a series of psychedelic drugs
- Translocase of the inner membrane, a complex of proteins found in the inner mitochondrial membrane of the mitochondria
- Timeless (gene), a gene involved in the fly circadian clock
- TIM barrel, a protein fold structure
- Transmembrane immunoglobulin and munin domain, a family of immunomodulatory proteins

=== Other uses in science and technology ===
- Tim, a nickname for the UK speaking clock telephone service
- Televisión Independiente de México, a Mexican national television network
- Thermal interface material, any material inserted between two parts to enhance the thermal coupling between
- TIM Group, an Italian telecommunications company
  - TIM Brasil, a Brazilian telecommunications company
  - TIM Hellas, a Greek telecommunications company
  - TIM San Marino, a San Marino telecommunications company
  - TIMvision, an Italian video on demand service
- IBM Tivoli Identity Manager, an identity-management system product
- TNO intestinal model, model systems mimicking the digestive tract
- Traffic indication map, a 802.11 frame management construct

== Other uses ==
- TIM, UNDP country code of East Timor
- TIM (Bulgaria), an organized crime syndicate incorporated as a holding company
- Tiako I Madagasikara, a Malagasy political party

== See also ==
- TIMS (disambiguation)
- Timothy (disambiguation)
- Timmy
- Timotheus
- Timo
