= Timothy Williams =

Timothy Williams may refer to:

- Timothy Williams (author) (born 1946), British writer
- Timothy Williams (composer) (born 1966), British film composer for film, TV and video games
- Timothy Shaler Williams (1862–1930), American journalist and president of the Brooklyn Rapid Transit Company
- Timothy P. Williams, United States Army general

== See also ==
- Tim Williams (disambiguation)
