= Weger =

Surname list

Weger is a surname. Notable persons with this surname include the following people:

- August Weger (1823–1892), German graphic artist
- Benjamin Weger (born 1989), Swiss biathlete
- Chester Weger (1939–2025), American murderer
- George S. Weger (1874–1935), American physician
- Kim Weger (born 1980), Canadian speed skater
- Mike Weger (born 1945), American football player
- Tymon de Weger (born 1955), Dutch politician
