= Thys =

Thys is a Dutch patronymic surname. It is an alternative spelling of Thijs, a very common nickname for Matthijs (Mattheus). The Dutch digraph ij and the y ("ij" without dots) were used interchangeably until the surname spelling fixations around 1810. The form "Thys" is particularly common in the Belgian province of Antwerp, while "Thijs" is most common in Belgian Limburg. Outside the Low Countries the spelling is almost exclusively "Thys." People with this surname include:

== Surname ==
- Albert Thys (1849–1915), Belgian businessman active in the Congo Free State
- Albert Thys (1894–1976), painter
- Alphonse Thys (1807–1879), French composer
- Antoine Thys (Antonius Thysius) (1565–1640), Dutch theologian
- Edith Thys (born 1966), American alpine skier
- Gert Thys (born 1971), South African long-distance runner
- Guy Thys (1922–2003), Belgian footballer and football coach
- Guy Lee Thys (born 1952), Belgian film producer, director, and screenwriter
- Gysbrecht Thys (1617–1684), Flemish painter
- Ivan Thys (1897–1982), Belgian footballer
- Jeffrey Thys (born 1988), Belgian field hockey player
- Nicolas Thys (born 1968), Belgian bassist
- Pauline Thys (c.1836–1909), French composer and librettist
- Philippe Thys (1889–1971), Belgian cyclist; three times winner of the Tour de France
- Thierry Thys (1931–2009), American aerospace engineer and pilot

== See also ==
- Thijs, given name, nickname and surname
- Tijs, an ever shorter Dutch form of Matthew
