= TIMS =

TIMS or Tims may refer to:

== Groups, organizations ==
- Telangana Institute of Medical Sciences and Research, Hyderabad, Telangana, India
- The International Molinological Society
- The Institute of Management Sciences

== People ==
- Tims (surname)

== Places ==
- Tims River, Shenandoah National Park, Virginia, USA; a river, a tributary of the Robinson River
- Tims Fork, West Virginia, USA; a river

== Science ==
- Thermal ionization mass spectrometry
- Trapped Ion Mobility Spectrometry
- Thermal infrared multispectral scanner; see Thermal infrared spectroscopy

== Other uses ==
- Telecommunication Instructional Modeling System, aka Emona TIMS, an electronic device for telecommunications training
- Theoretical Intermarket Margin System a risk-based margin methodology used by the Options Clearing Corporation
- Tims, a nickname for boots made by Timerland

== See also ==
- Tim (disambiguation)
- Timberland (company), whose boots are known as Tims
- Tim Hortons (leaf logo: "Tims", using "Tim" in Quebec; known as "Tim's"), a chain of coffeeshops in Canada
