= Joensuu (surname) =

Joensuu is a Finnish surname. Notable people with the surname include:

- Jasmi Joensuu (born 1996), Finnish cross-country skier
- Jesse Joensuu (born 1987), Finnish ice hockey player
- Jouni Joensuu (born 1962), Finnish association football manager
- Matti Yrjänä Joensuu (1948–2011), Finnish writer
- Timo Joensuu (born 1959), Finnish oncologist
