= Tymchuk =

Tymchuk (Ukrainian: Тимчук) is a Ukrainian surname. It derives from the Christian name Timothy, and its Ukrainian derivatives, Tymko. The surname, Tymchuk, was created by adding the Ukrainian patronymic suffix, -uk, meaning someone of Tymko, usually the son of Tymko. It may refer to the following individuals:

- Dmytro Tymchuk (1972–2019), Ukrainian military expert and blogger
- Yakiv Tymchuk (1919–1988), Ukrainian Greek Catholic clandestine bishop

== Related surnames ==
- Tymoshenko
- Tymoschuk
