= Tim Moore =

Tim Moore may refer to:

== Politicians ==
- Tim Moore (North Carolina politician) (born 1970), American politician from North Carolina
- Tim Moore (Michigan politician) (born 1967), State House Representative for the 97th District of Michigan
- Tim Moore (Australian politician) (born 1948), New South Wales politician
- Tim Moore (Kentucky politician) (born 1966), House of Representative member from Kentucky

== Others ==
- Tim Moore (comedian) (1887–1958), American actor, vaudeville and television comedian
- Tim Moore (writer) (born 1964), British travel writer and humorist
- Tim Moore (singer-songwriter), American songwriter who released five solo albums on Elektra Records
- Tim Moore (diver) (born 1953), American diver

== See also ==
- Tim (disambiguation)
- Moore (surname)
