= Suomenmaa =

- Type: Daily newspaper
- Format: Tabloid
- Owner(s): Joutsen Media
- Editor: Mikko Rämö
- Founded: 1908; 117 years ago
- Political alignment: Centre Party
- Headquarters: Oulu
- Website: www.suomenmaa.fi

Suomenmaa (Finnish pronunciation: [ˈsuo̯memˌmɑː]) is a Finnish language party newspaper published four days a week from Tuesday to Friday in Oulu, Finland.

== History and profile ==
The newspaper was established in 1908 as Maakansa in Viipuri to support the Agrarian League. Later the editors moved from Viipuri to Helsinki. Then the headquarters of the paper moved to Oulu. When the Agrarian League changed its name to Center Party in 1965 during Johannes Virolainen's chairmanship Maakansa also changed its name. Therefore, the paper is the organ of the Centre Party. Apart from Suomenmaa, the publisher Joutsen Media owns Oulu, Koillissanomat (1986-), Iijokiseutu, Rantalakeus (1976-) as well as Kolmiokirjan (1981-), Regina magazine and many cross word magazines.

Suomenmaa has both local and national editions. Its local edition was published five times a week in the Northern Bothnia until the end of 2009. Its national edition is published three times a week. According to official figures paper's circulation was 10 077 copies. In January 2010 a new monthly delivered to the subscribers Sentteri was published first time. Its circulation was 60 000 copies.

The editor-in-chief is Juha Määttä. In 1997 the local edition of Suomenmaan had a circulation of 5,100 copies. The circulation of its national edition was 11,200 copies the same year.

== Chief editors ==
- Juha Määttä 2011
- Pekka Perttula 2010
- Pirkko Wilen 2010, acting
- Timo Laaninen
- Juho Mauno 1999–2008
- Samuli Pohjamo
- Otto Karhi 1908-?
