= Timothée =

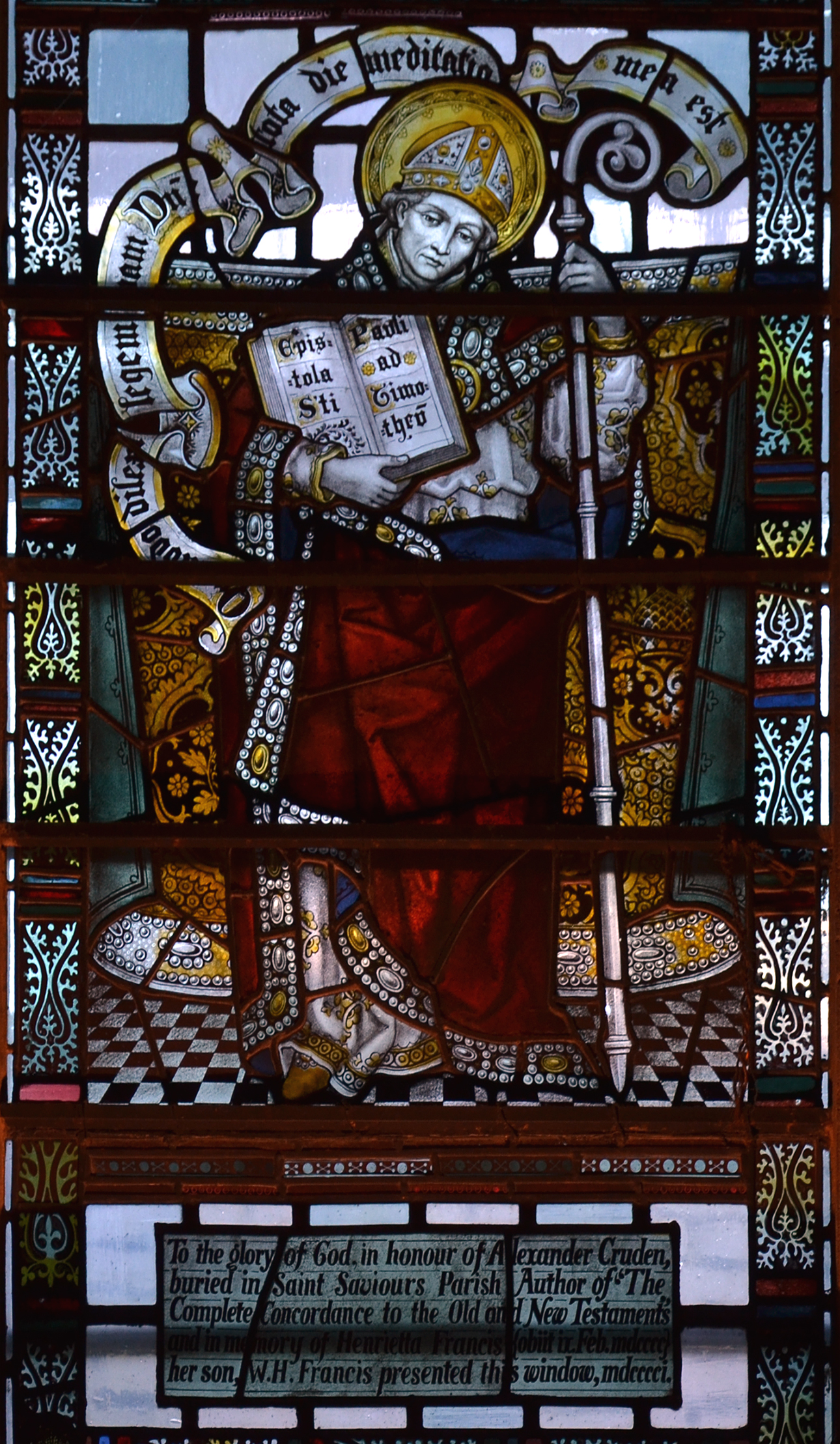
- Saint Timotheus
- Pronunciation: French pronunciation: [ti.mɔ.te]
- Gender: Male
- Language: French

Origin
- Origin: Greek name Τιμόθεος
- Meaning: "Honouring God" or "Honoured by God"

Other names
- Related names: Timothy, Timo, Timofei, Tymish, Timotey, Timoteo, Timotheus, Tymoteusz, Tijs

Timothée is a French masculine given name. It is the French variant of the ancient Greek given name Τιμόθεος (Timotheos) meaning "one who honours God", from τιμή "honour" and θεός "god". The Latin equivalent is Timotheus. Its English equivalent is Timothy.

== People ==
Timothée or Timothé may refer to:

=== Given name ===
- Timothee Adamowski (1858–1943), Polish-born American conductor, composer, and violinist
- Timothée Adolphe (born 1989), French Paralympic athlete
- Timothée Atouba (born 1982), Cameroonian footballer
- Timothee Besset, French programmer
- Timothée Brodeur (1804–1860), notary and political figure in Canada East
- Timothée Chaillou, French art critic
- Timothée Chalamet (born 1995), French-American actor
- Timothé Cognat (born 1998), French footballer
- Timothée Dieng (born 1992), French footballer
- Timothée de Fombelle (born 1973), French author and playwright
- Timothée Franchère (c. 1790–1849), Canadien businessman and political figure
- Timothée Guillimin (born 1996), French rugby union player
- Timothee Heijbrock (born 1985), Dutch rower
- Timothée Jordan, French cricketer
- Timothée Kolodziejczak (born 1991), French footballer
- Timothé Luwawu-Cabarrot (born 1995), French basketball player
- Timothée Malendoma (1935–2010), Central African politician
- Timothée Modibo-Nzockena (1950–2016), Roman Catholic bishop
- Timothé Nadim (born 1997), French politician and musician
- Timothé Nkada (born 1999), French footballer
- Timothée Pembélé (born 2002), French footballer
- Timothée Picard (born 1975), French academic and music critic
- Timothée Puel (1813–1890), French physician and botanist
- Timothé Rupil (born 2003), Luxembourgian footballer
- Timothée Taufflieb (born 1992), French footballer
- Timothee Yap Jin Wei (born 1994), Singaporean sprinter

=== Surname ===
- Didier Thimothée (born 1970), French footballer
- John Timothee (1870–1901), Australian rules footballer
- Louis Timothee (1699–1738), printer and publisher in colonial America

== See also ==
- Tymoteusz
- Timothy (given name)
- Tim
- Timmy
- Timo
- Timotheus
- Timoteo (given name)
