= Hervé Lacombe =

French musicologist

Hervé Lacombe (French pronunciation: [ɛʁve lakɔ̃b]) is a French musicologist, a professor at the University Rennes 2 since 2002 and a specialist of music of France. He is the author of several works on the opera and two biographies, one of Georges Bizet and the other of Francis Poulenc.

== Biography ==
Hervé Lacombe studied at the université Lyon II, and the Conservatoire national supérieur de musique et de danse de Paris, before passing his aggregation of music and to support a doctoral thesis and a university degree in musicology.

He received a scholarship from the École française de Rome and a delegation to the Centre national de la recherche scientifique. Initially a lecturer at the University of Metz, he has been a professor at the université Rennes 2 since 2002.

Hervé Lacombe is a member of the editorial board of the monumental edition L’Opéra français, Bärenreiter-Verlag, and of the International Advisory Panel of the Journal of the Royal Musical Association.

== Publications ==
- 1997: Les Voies de l'opéra français au XIXe siècle, Fayard, 392 p., prix Bernier of the Académie des beaux-arts 1997, prix des Muses (prix spécial du jury) 1998 and prix Eugène Carrière of the Académie française 1998
- 2001: The Keys to French Opera in the Nineteenth Century, revised and augmented version of Les Voies de l'opéra français au XIXe siècle, trad. Edward Schneider, Berkeley, University of California Press, 442 p.
- 2000: Georges Bizet : Naissance d'une identité créatrice, Fayard, ISBN 978-2-213-60794-8, 860 p., prix Bordin de l'Académie des beaux-arts 2001
- 2007: Géographie de l'opéra au XXe siècle, Fayard, 317 p.
- 2011: Opéra et fantastique (direction with Timothée Picard), Presses Universitaires de Rennes, 428 p. ISBN 978-2-7535-1324-2.
- 2013: Francis Poulenc, grand prix des Muses-Fondation Singer-Polignac 2014 and prix Pelléas 2014
- 2014: La Habanera de Carmen, with Christine Rodriguez, Fayard, 224 p.
