= Docrates Cancer Center =

Hospital in Finland

Docrates Cancer Center is the first and currently the only private hospital in the Nordic countries that comprehensively specialises in cancer treatment. It operates in Helsinki, Finland. It characterises its operations as those complementing the public sector. Docrates Oy was established in 2006 and the hospital started its operations at the premises of Eira Hospital in autumn 2007. It moved to its own premises in Jätkäsaari, Helsinki, in 2009, where it has hospital rights. There is a ward and Health and Recovery Center located at Docrates Cancer Center. Among other things, diagnostics, pharmacotherapy, radiation therapy and isotopic treatments are carried out at the hospital. Cancer surgeries are performed in partner hospitals. Docrates also participates in clinical trials and the testing and development of new treatments.

The property of Docrates at Saukonpaadenranta is a part of the regional building project of Länsisatama in Jätkäsaari. The hospital's co-operation partners also work there.

== Founders, ownership basis and business economics ==
Docrates Oy was established in 2006 by physicist Pekka Aalto, doctor Timo Joensuu and physicist Harri Puurunen.

Pekka Aalto (born 1945) has participated in the development of the targeted radiotherapy that saves tissue, and acted as an entrepreneur and business manager in the field of radiotherapy technology. Timo Joensuu, associate professor of medical oncology (born 1959), has as a doctor and a researcher specialised in cancer drugs as well as radiotherapy and isotopic treatments. He has acted as the chief clinical director of Docrates hospital for years. Starting from March 2014, specialist in medical oncology and radiotherapy, Associate Professor Tom Wiklund has acted as the chief clinical director of the hospital. Harri Puurunen (born 1959) has as a physicist participated in the projects of Dosetek, directed by Aalto, and worked with corporate financing in the public sector and as the director of technology of Tekes. Puurunen was the managing director of Docrates during 2006 and 2010 and during 2011 and 2012 and thereafter the CFO. During 2010 and 2011, the managing director was Marco Hautalahti. In 2012, Siv Schalin was appointed as the managing director. She was the managing director of GE Healthcare Finland. In 2017, Ilpo Tolonen started as the managing director of Docrates. Ilpo Tolonen was previously the managing director in MSD Finland and Baltics.

The regular staff of doctors of the hospital include: Kalevi Kairemo, chief physician of molecular radiotherapy and nuclear medicine; Tuomo Alanko, chief physician of medical oncology; Martti Ala-Opas, chief urologist; Kaarina Partanen, chief radiologist; and Leila Vaalavirta, chief oncologist of radiotherapy.

A group of private individuals became shareholders of Docrates Oy and, in 2008, Helsingin Lääkärikeskus, currently Aava Terveyspalvelut Oy, became the largest owner.

The number of employees is more than 50 persons. In addition to that, approximately 30 specialist doctors and other clinical experts in oncology work at the hospital. The number of patient visits was 17,000 per year. A fifth of all patients were from abroad. The majority of foreign patients come from Russia, the Nordic Countries and the Baltic Countries.

== Pioneer in treatments ==
Timo Joensuu, associate professor and chief clinical director of Docrates Cancer Center, worked in the cancer clinic of HYKS (Helsinki University Central Hospital) for 15 years. He met Aalto in 1995. Joensuu was the first in the Nordic Countries to employ IMRT (intensity-modulated radiation therapy). A precisely destroying dose is directed at a tumour but surrounding tissues are protected. Even before that a stereotactic treatment was developed where the treatment is directed tridimensionally with the help of computer and magnetic resonance imagery. The synthesis of the IMRT and the stereotactic treatment is known as the Rapid Arc-technique developed in Finland that speeds up the treatment. New treatments make the radiation therapy curing cancer almost harmless without serious side effects of treatments. They improve the treatment outcome.

One of the recent methods in radiation therapy related to cancer care is called HDR (High Dose Rate) internal brachytherapy. Prior to HDR, LDR (Low Dose Rate) brachytherapy was commonly in use for prostate cancer. Chief urologist of Docrates, Dr. Martti Ala-Opas, was the first one in Finland who utilized LDR brachytherapy for prostate cancer. Docrates Cancer Center has the longest and the most extensive experience in HDR-brachytherapy treatments for prostate cancer in Finland. New radiation therapy methods allow tumors to be treated in a more targeted way using bigger doses of radiation, yet having better treatments results with less side effects.
