= Timmie =

Timmie is a given name. Notable people with the name include:

- Timmie Jean Lindsey (born 1932), first silicone breast implant recipient
- Timmie Rogers (1915–2006), American comedian, singer-songwriter, actor
- Timmie Ware (born 1963), American football player

== See also ==
- Timme, given name and surname
- Timmy, given name
