= Netherlands Organisation for Applied Scientific Research =

Dutch organisation

- Nederlandse Organisatie voor Toegepast Natuurwetenschappelijk Onderzoek

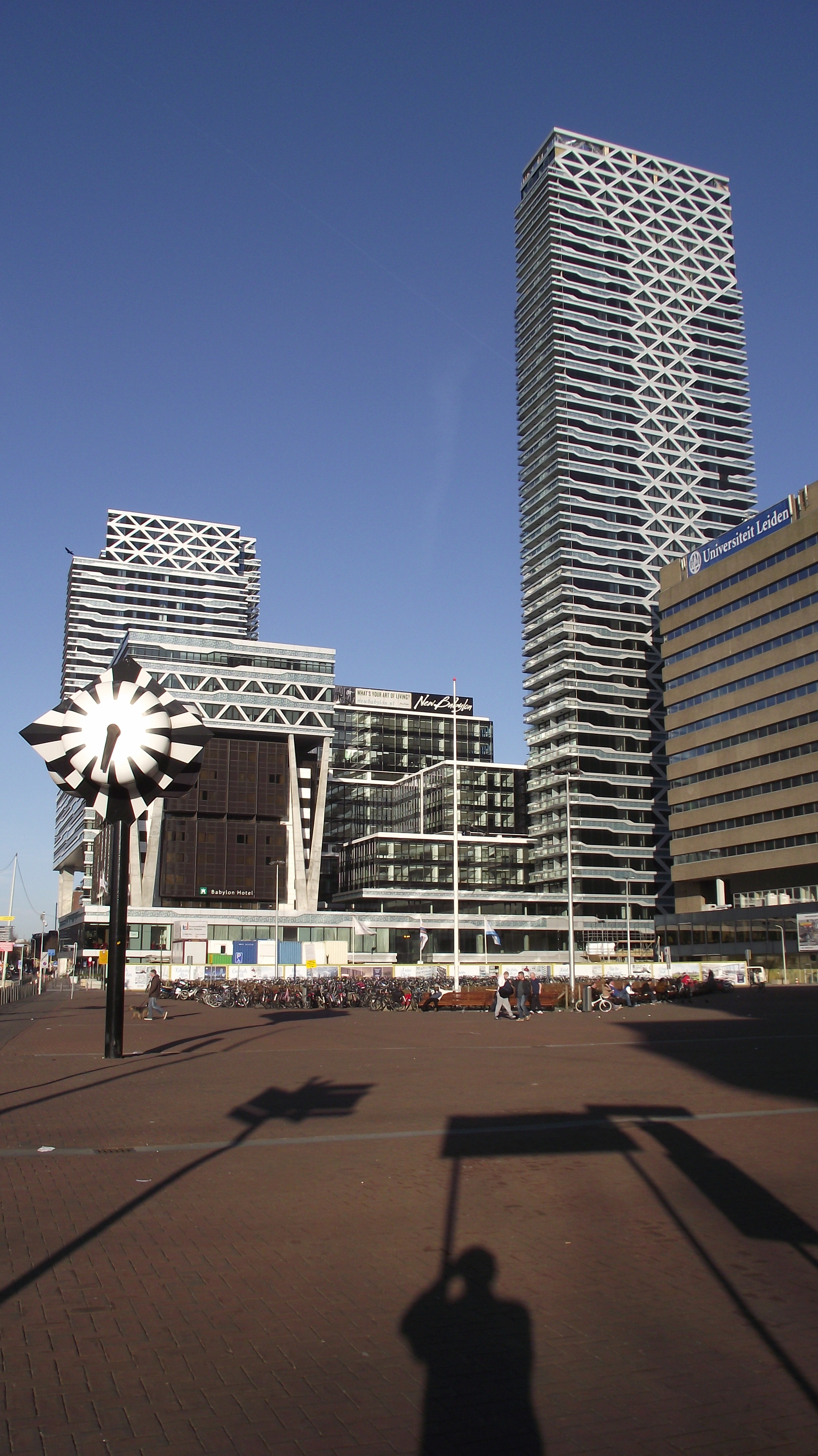
- New Babylon in The Hague, head office of TNO since 2015
- Abbreviation: TNO
- Formation: 1932
- Headquarters: The Hague, Netherlands
- Employees: 3,900
- Website: https://www.tno.nl/en/

The Netherlands Organisation for Applied Scientific Research (Dutch: Nederlandse Organisatie voor Toegepast Natuurwetenschappelijk Onderzoek, abbreviated TNO, "Dutch Organisation for Applied Scientific Research") is an independent statutory research organisation in the Netherlands that focuses on applied science. It conducts contract research, offers specialist consulting services, and grants licences for patents and specialist software. TNO founds new companies to market innovations.

== Background ==
TNO was established by law in 1932 to support companies and governments. TNO also held a 10% stake in the Austrian research centre Joanneum Research from 2004 to 2014.

== Model ==
The work of TNO is focused on the so-called Top Sectors and social issues relevant to Europe.

While the Early Research Programmes and Shared Innovation Programmes receive partial public funding, the subsequent development and application of research results are conducted through contract research, which is entirely funded by TNO's customers.

== Projects ==
- TROPOMI: A satellite instrument that carries out measurements of the troposphere.
- Personalised Digital Health: A project focused on personalised diagnosis, prognosis and treatment.
- Hybridisation of Trucks and Buses: Focuses on reducing the total cost of ownership for trucks and buses.
- Truck Platooning: This project develops truck platooning technology.
- Blockchain: Provides a blockchain laboratory.
- Shaded Dome: Developed in cooperation with the armed forces, it is a dome structure designed to protect against adverse weather conditions and provide ballistic protection.
- The GeoERA programme: Several institutions from 31 countries cooperate on geological research projects.
- Innovation for Development: A programme designed to disseminate research results to small and medium-sized enterprises.
- SolaRoad: A bike path made from solar panels, known as a "SolaRoad". It deteriorated within a few years and was removed in 2020 after being considered a failure.
- TIM: TNO Intestinal Models, a system of models to mimic the digestive tract.

== Locations ==
TNO is headquartered in The Hague. Other locations include Amsterdam, Delft, Rijswijk, Leiden, Groningen, Helmond, Petten, Soesterberg, Utrecht, Ypenburg, Zeist and Eindhoven. TNO also has international branch offices in Shin-Yokohama (Japan), Toronto (Canada), Brussels (Belgium), Doha (Qatar), Singapore and Aruba. The Hoofddorp and Enschede locations were closed in 2014.

== Criticism ==
In 2006, a Swiss research group refuted a widely publicised TNO report that claimed UMTS radiation was a health hazard. The organisation also received criticism after the evacuation of 200 residents from an Amsterdam housing estate over fears about its structural integrity, even though the construction had been technically approved by TNO only five months earlier. TNO was also criticised for its handling, in 2006, of an investigation into the collapse of a balcony in Maastricht in 2003 that killed two people.

In 2018, TNO was accused of committing fraud—specifically of disguising the cause of the Enschede fireworks disaster—following an investigation by Paul van Buitenen.
