= Tim Williams =

Tim Williams may refer to:

- Tim Williams (actor) (born 1966), American actor
- Timothy Williams (composer) (born 1966), English composer, conductor and orchestrator for film, TV and video games
- Tim Williams (folk musician) (born 1979), American singer-songwriter
- Tim Williams (American football), American football player
- Tim Williams (rock musician) (born 1982), American indie rock singer-songwriter
- Tim Williams, heavy metal singer (Bloodsimple, Vision of Disorder)
- Tim Williams (Tangle), fictional character on the TV series Tangle

== See also ==
- Timothy Williams (disambiguation)
