= TNO intestinal model =

TNO (gastro-) Intestinal Models (“TIM”) is a system of models mimicking the digestive tract. The system was developed by TNO, the Netherlands Organisation for Applied Scientific Research.

The models are dynamic computer controlled multi-compartmental systems with adjustable parameters for the physiological conditions of the stomach and intestine. Temperature, peristalsis, bile secretion, secretion of saliva, stomach and pancreas enzymes are all fully adjustable. The TIM systems are being used to study the behavior of oral products during transit through the stomach, the small intestine and large intestine. Commonly performed studies concern the digestibility of food and food components, the bioaccessibility for absorption of pharmaceutical compounds, proteins, fat, minerals and (water- and fat-soluble) vitamins.

There are different models for the stomach and small intestine (TIM-1 and Tiny-TIM) and a model simulating the physiological conditions of the colon (TIM-2).

The TIM-1 system consists of a stomach compartment and 3 compartments for the small intestine, the duodenum, jejunum and ileum. The Tiny-TIM system consists of a stomach compartment and one single compartment for the small intestine. Samples can be harvested for analysis from these models from any compartment at any time.

TIM-2 simulates the colon, containing the microbiota as found in human colon. This model serves as a tool to study fermentation of non-digestible food components (fibers and prebiotics) and the release of drugs specifically targeted for the colon.
