= Timofey Kiryanov =

Russian footballer

Personal information
- Full name: Timofey Vladimirovich Kiryanov
- Date of birth: 10 December 1970 (age 55)
- Height: 1.80 m (5 ft 11 in)
- Positions: Forward; midfielder

Senior career*
Years	Team	Apps	(Gls)
1988–1990	PFC CSKA-2 Moscow	49	(0)
1991	FC Moslift Moscow		
1992	FC Trestar Ostankino	31	(6)
1993–1995	FC Mosenergo Moscow	100	(6)
1996	FC Chernomorets Novorossiysk	4	(0)
1996	→ FC Chernomorets-d Novorossiysk (loan)	6	(0)
1997–1998	FC Uralmash Yekaterinburg	49	(3)
1999	FC Moskabelmet Moscow (amateur)		
2000	FC Lotto-MKM Moscow	27	(7)
2001	FC Podderzhka Odintsovo		
2003	FC Dmitrov (amateur)		
2005–2006	FC Dmitrov (amateur)		
2007–2008	FC Zvezda Zvenigorod		
2009	FC Prialit Reutov		
- * Club domestic league appearances and goals

Timofey Vladimirovich Kiryanov (Russian: Тимофей Владимирович Кирьянов; born 10 December 1970) is a former Russian football player.
