= Timothée Picard =

French academic and music critic (born 1975)

Timothée Picard (born 1975) is a French academic and music critic.

== Biography ==
Timothée Picard studied at the École normale supérieure de Fontenay-Saint-Cloud (1995–2001) and the Institut d'études politiques de Paris (1999–2001). He holds an aggregation of modern letters (1999) and a doctorate of letters (2004). His PhD thesis, defended at the University of Strasbourg under the direction of Pascal Dethurens, is entitled La littérature face au défi wagnérien. From 2005 to 2012, he was maître de conférences in general and comparative literature at the University of Rennes 2 – Upper Brittany. In 2011, he was elected as a junior member of the Institut universitaire de France on a project devoted to the conceptions and representations of music through the literature and history of European ideas. Since 2012, he is a professor of general and comparative literature at Rennes 2. His research focuses on the relationship between literature, the arts (especially music, but also cinema), and the history of ideas.

As a music critic, he collaborates with magazines Classica and L'Avant-Scène Opéra. He regularly gives lectures or program contributions in opera houses and opera festivals in France and abroad.

With Jean Cléder, he founded the "Transversales cinematographiques" festival in Rennes in 2011, dedicated to the relationship between cinema and other arts.

== Publications ==
- Wagner, une question européenne : contribution à une étude du wagnérisme, 1860-2004, Rennes, Presses universitaires de Rennes, 2006, 550 p. ISBN 2-7535-0302-8
- L'art total : grandeur et misère d'une utopie (autour de Wagner), Rennes, Presses universitaires de Rennes, 2006, 464 p. ISBN 2-7535-0294-3
- Christoph Willibald Gluck, Arles, Actes Sud, 2007, 253 p. ISBN 978-2-7427-6589-8
- Détours et métissage : Le cinéma de Benoit Jacquot (direction with Jean Cléder), Lormont, Le Bord de l’eau, 2008, 171 p. ISBN 978-2-915651-84-3
- Patrice Chéreau : transversales : théâtre, cinéma, opéra (direction with Jean Cléder and Didier Plassard), Lormont, Le Bord de l’eau, 2010, 225 p. ISBN 978-2-35687-073-5
- Dictionnaire encyclopédique Wagner (direction) Arles, Actes Sud, Paris, Cité de la musique, 2010, 2494 p. ISBN 978-2-74277-843-0 Rewarded by the prix de la Critique 2010 and the Prix des Muses 2011 ("Special Prize of the jury")
- Comprendre la musique. Les contributions de Boris de Schlœzer à la Revue musicale and La Nouvelle Revue française, 1921-1956 (edition), Rennes, Presses Universitaires de Rennes, 2011, 435 p. ISBN 978-2-7535-1343-3
- Opéra et fantastique (direction with Hervé Lacombe), Rennes, Presses universitaires de Rennes, 2011, 428 p. ISBN 978-2-7535-1324-2
- Âge d’or – décadence – régénération, Un modèle fondateur pour l’imaginaire musical européen, Paris, Classiques Garnier, 2013, 913 p. ISBN 978-2-8124-1286-8
- Verdi – Wagner, imaginaire de l’opéra et identités nationales, Arles, Actes Sud, 2013, 336 p. ISBN 978-2-330-02297-6 Rewarded by the Prix des Muses 2014 ("Prix de l'essai")
- Christophe Honoré : le cinéma nous inachève (direction with Jean Cléder), Lormont, Le Bord de l'eau, 2014, 256 p. ISBN 978-2356871466
- L'Artifice dans les lettres et les arts (direction with Elisabeth Lavezzi), Rennes, PUR, 2015, 543 p. ISBN 978-2753541450
- Opéra et mise en scène, vol. 2 (direction), special issue of L'Avant-Scène Opéra n° 289, November 2015, 146 p. ISBN 978-2843853241
- La civilisation de l'opéra : sur les traces d'un fantôme, Paris, Fayard, 2016, 734 p. ISBN 978-2-213-68182-5
- Nombreuses entrées dans les dictionnaires Tout Mozart (Éditions Robert Laffont, series "Bouquins", 2005 ISBN 2-221-10437-4, Tout Bach (Robert Laffont, series "Bouquins", 2009, ISBN 978-2-221-10991-5, L’Univers de l’Opéra (Robert Laffont, series "Bouquins", 2012, ISBN 978-2-221-11546-6 and Tout Verdi (Robert Laffont, series "Bouquins", 2013, ISBN 978-2-221-11545-9, directed by Bertrand Dermoncourt.
