= Timme =

Timme is a given name and surname. Notable people with the name include:

== Given name ==
- Timme Hoyng (born 1976), Dutch field hockey player
- Timme Rosenkrantz (1911–1969), Danish aristocrat, author and jazz enthusiast

== Surname ==
- Dieter Timme (1956–2024), German football player and manager
- Drew Timme (born 2000), American basketball player
- Ernst Timme (1843–1923), American politician
- Herman Timme (born 1933), Dutch decathlete

== See also ==
- Charles J. Timmes (1907–1990), United States Army major general
- Timmie, given name
