= Timoteo (given name) =

Given name most often associated with males

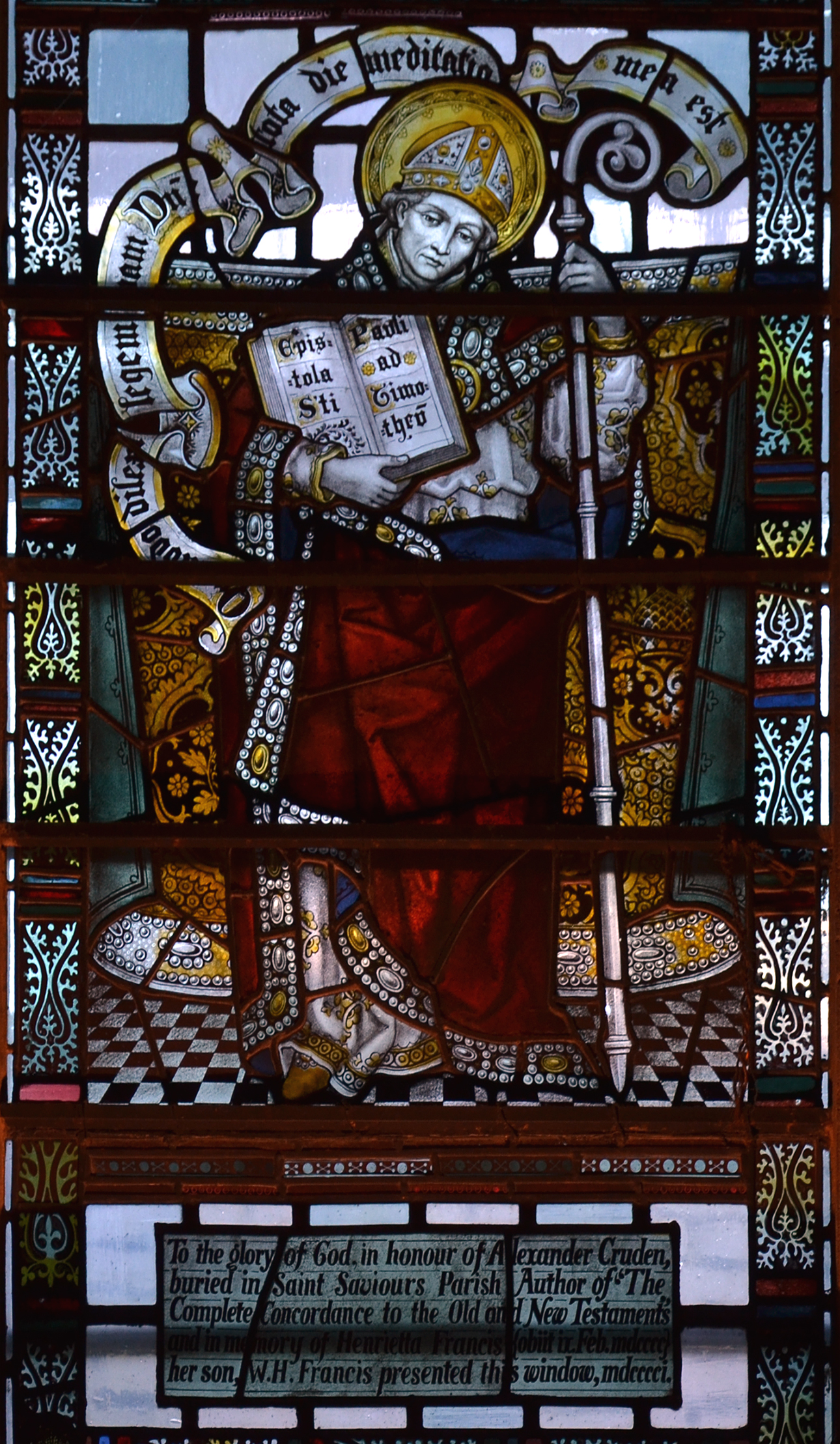
- Saint Timotheus
- Pronunciation: /ˈtɪməθi/
- Gender: Male

Origin
- Origin: Greek name Τιμόθεος
- Meaning: "Honouring God" or "Honoured by God"

Other names
- Related names: Tim, Timo, Timofei, Tymish, Timotej, Timotey, Timotheus, Tymoteusz, Timothée

The name Timoteo is a Spanish, Portuguese, and Italian form of the Greek name Τιμόθεος (Timόtheos), equal to the name Timothy in English. It comes from the Greek words timḗ (honor, respect) and theos (God). Thus the name means "honoring God".

In the Bible, Timothy was the name of a young disciple and companion of Paul. Paul addressed two epistles to him, the First and Second Epistle to Timothy.

== Given name ==
- Timoteo Aparicio
- Timoteo Briet Montaud
- Timoteo Haalilio
- Timoteo Hikmat Beylouni
- Timoteo Luberza
- Timoteo Maradona
- Timoteo Martínez Pérez
- Timoteo Menéndez
- Timoteo Ofrasio
- Timoteo Pasini
- Timoteo Pérez Vargas
- Timoteo Viti

== Surname ==
- Sabine Timoteo
- Agnaldo Timóteo
- Wesley Timoteo
- Luís Timóteo
- Mose Timoteo
- Gregorio L Timoteo

== See also ==
- Timothy
- Tim
- Timmy
- Timo
- Timotheus
- Timothée
- Timofey
