= Tim Peters =

Tim Peters may refer to:

- Tim A. Peters, American humanitarian aid worker in South Korea
- Tim Peters (software engineer) (1952–2026), American software developer
- Tim Peters (political scientist) (born 1973), German political scientist and lawyer

== See also ==
- Timothy Peters (born 1980), American stock car racing driver
