= Timotheus =

Given name most often associated with males

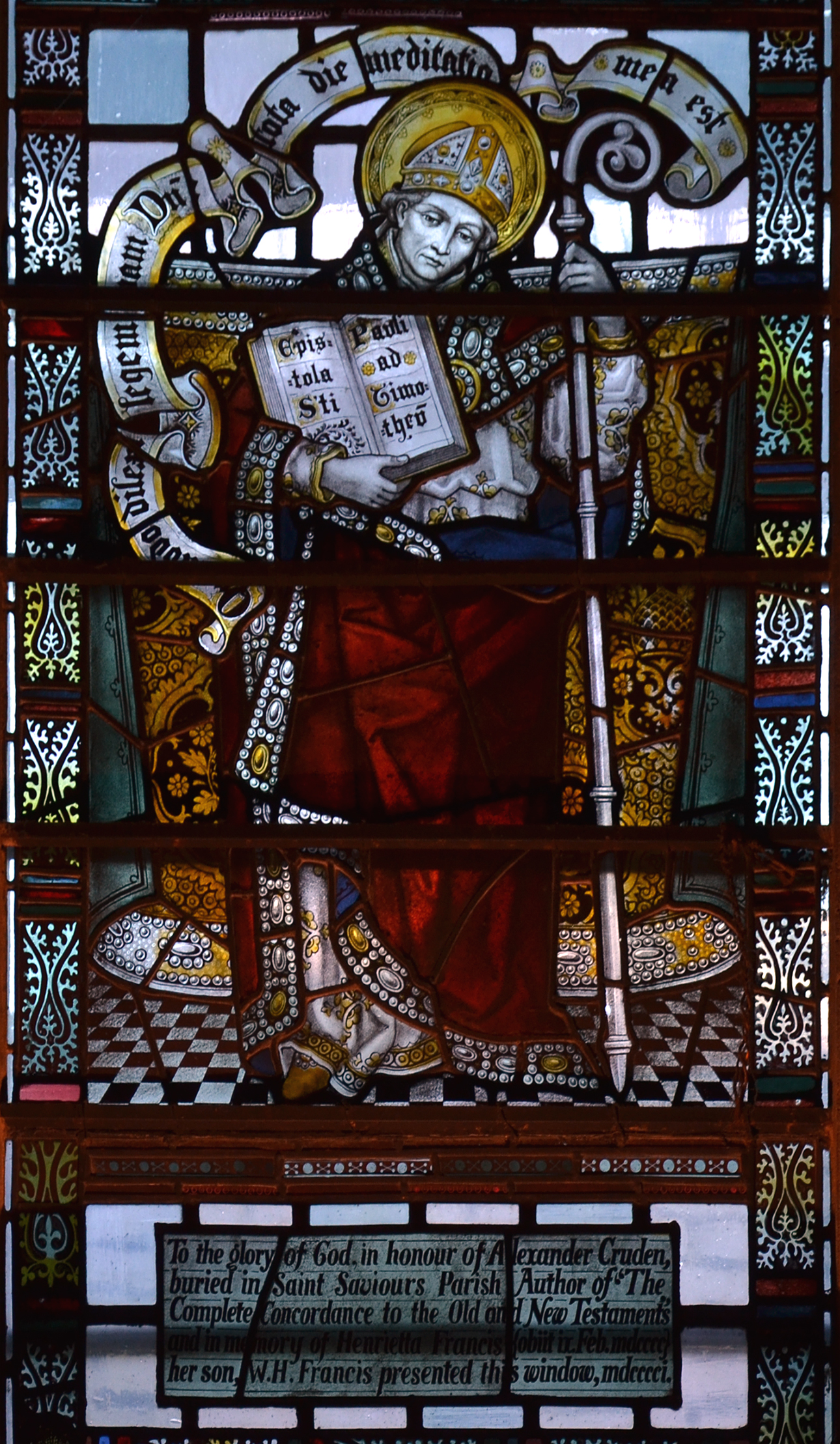
- Saint Timotheus
- Pronunciation: /ˈtɪməθi/
- Gender: male

Origin
- Origin: Greek name Τιμόθεος
- Meaning: "Honouring God" or "Honoured by God"

Other names
- Nicknames: Timmy, Timo, Timbo
- Related names: Timothy, Tim, Timo, Timofei, Tymish, Timotej, Timotey, Timoteo, Timotheus, Tymoteusz, Timothée, Tijs

Timotheus is a masculine given name. It is a Latinized version of the Greek name Τιμόθεος (Timόtheos) meaning "one who honours God", from τιμή "honour" and θεός "god". The English version Timothy (and its variations) is a common name in several countries.

== People ==
- Timotheus of Miletus, 5th century BC Greek poet and musician at the court of Archelaus I of Macedon
- Timotheus (general) 4th century BC, Athenian statesman and general, son of the general Conon
- Timotheus (sculptor), 4th century BC Greek sculptor who took part in the building of Mausoleum of Maussollos
- Timotheus of Heraclea, 4th century BC ruler of Heraclea Pontica, and the son of the tyrant Clearchus of Heraclea
- Timotheus (aulist), a late 4th century BC musician at the court of Alexander the Great
- Timotheus (Ammon), a 2nd-century BC Ammonite opponent of Judas Maccabeus
- Timotheus of Tralles, 2nd century BC, victor of the 163 Ancient Olympic Games at Stadion
- Saint Timotheus, 1st century AD Christian leader
- Timotheus of Gaza, 5th century AD Greek grammarian active during the reign of Anastasius
- Pope Timotheus I of Alexandria, 4th century bishop
- Pope Timotheus II of Alexandria, also known as Timotheus Aelurus, 5th century AD monophysite bishop
- Timotheus Salophakiolos, known as Timotheus III, the Greek Orthodox patriarch of Alexandria from 460—475 and again from 477 until his death in 485.
- Timotheus IV of Alexandria, a bishop in the 6th century. Also known as Timothy III, since the Coptic Church does not recognize the third Timothy.
- Daumantas of Pskov, also known as Timotheus of Pskov, 13th Century AD patron saint of the city of Pskov

== Other uses ==
- Léal Souvenir, a 1432 portrait by Jan van Eyck alternately known as Timotheus

== See also ==
- Tymoteusz
- Timothy (given name)
- Tim
- Timmy
- Timo
- Timofey
- Timotheos
- Timoteo
- Timothy (disambiguation)
- Tim (disambiguation)
- Timoti
