= Timothy Shaler Williams =

American journalist

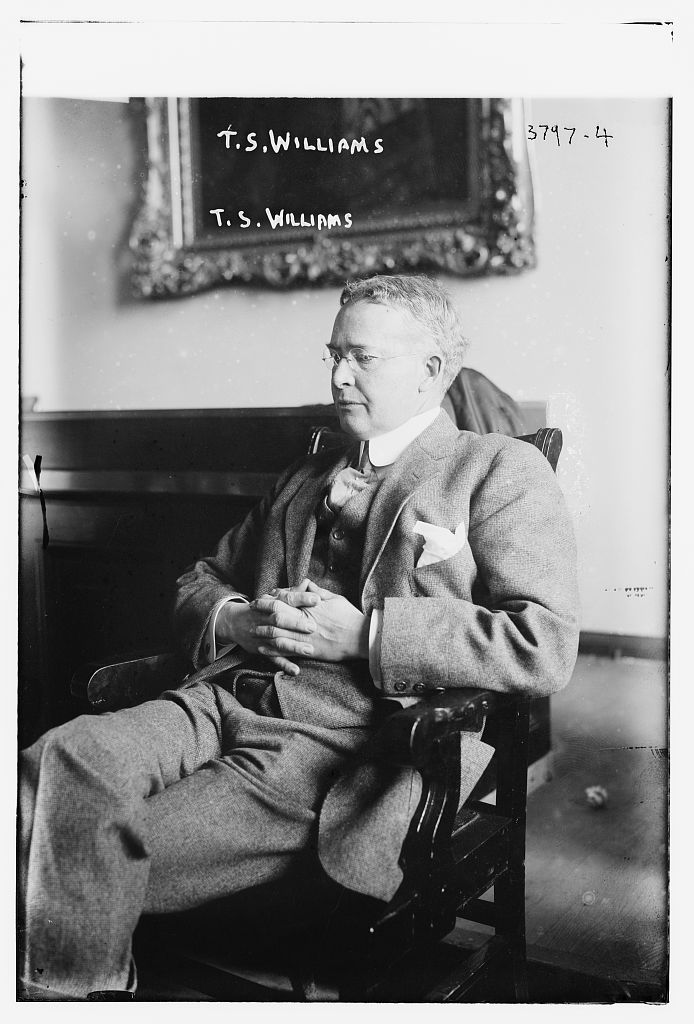
Timothy Shaler Williams in 1916 before testifying before the Thompson Legislative Committee

Colonel Timothy Shaler Williams (August 1, 1862 - June 3, 1930) was an American journalist, and later president of the Brooklyn Rapid Transit Company.

== Biography ==
He was born on August 1, 1862, in Ithaca, New York, to Frances Henrietta Grant and Howard Cornelius Williams. He worked as a journalist for a New York City newspaper from 1884 to 1889. He was private secretary to two New York governors, David Bennett Hill and Roswell Pettibone Flower . He married Alice Williams on October 31, 1895. In 1895 he joined the Brooklyn Rapid Transit Company and was president from 1911 until his retirement in 1923. He died on June 3, 1930, in Manhattan, New York City, from heat stroke.
