= Timo Laaninen =

Finnish politician

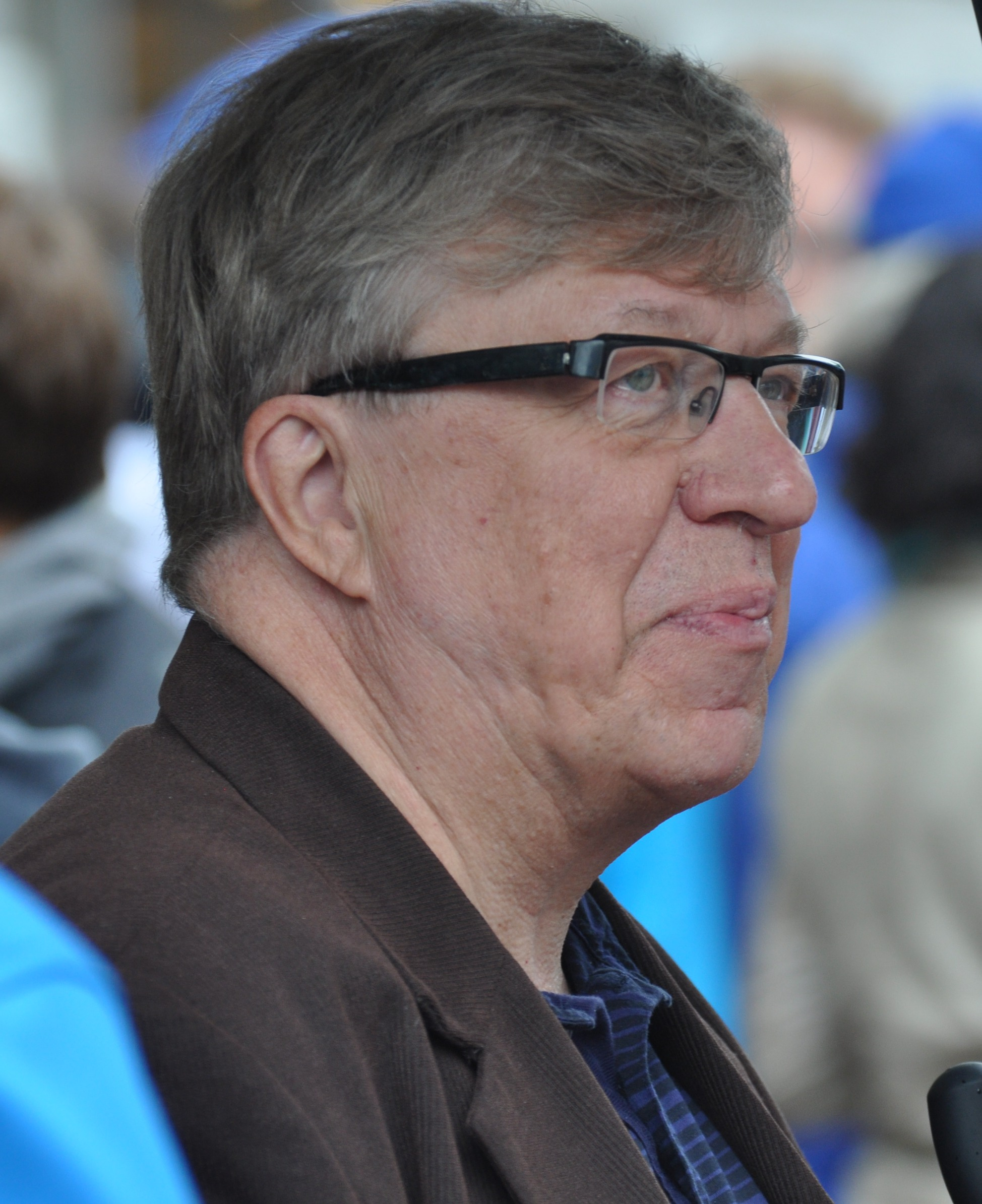
Timo Laaninen in 2013

Timo Laaninen was the party secretary of the Centre Party in Finland from June 12, 2010 to 2016. Laaninen was the editor-in-chief of Suomenmaa party newspaper from January 2008 up to 2010. Before that he has been a political secretary (special adviser) in Esko Aho's cabinet to the minister of internal affairs, Mauri Pekkarinen, minister for foreign affairs Heikki Haavisto and prime minister Esko Aho. In Anneli Jäätteenmäki's cabinet he was a political secretary for prime minister Anneli Jäätteenmäki and later also for Matti Vanhanen in Matti Vanhanen's cabinet.

== Political career ==
Laaninen supported Matti Vanhanen's presidential campaign by writing an electoral campaign book Se on ihan Matti! (It is really Matti!, the proverb Olen ihan Matti means I am really sure of it), which was published 23 October 2005.

During the juridical process Antti-Pekka Pietilä claimed, that Timo Laaninen had said, that the political secretaries of the Centre Party in Finland will take care of the fact that the editor-in-chief of Ilta-Sanomat, a Sanoma company will have to resign. Timo Laaninen denied this on his behalf on 4 December 2006. Laaninen had said, that there is a half-criminal part in the Centre Party in Finland, which "collects money from here and there and manipulates the construction permission plans" (Keskustassa on puolirikollinen osa, joka kähmii vaalirahoja sieltä sun täältä ja suhmuroi vaalirahoja).

Laaninen described the elections in 2011 as historical, as there are big issues to solve. Väestö ikääntyy, työssäkäyvien määrä suhteessa pienenee ja takana on finanssikriisi, jonka seurauksena valtiot ovat velkaantuneet aika pahasti. Kyllä tässä on isot asiat käsillä. (The population grows older, the relative proportion of the working people diminishes and there is a financial crisis behind, which had led to the badly debt-driven states. There are big issues within the reach of hands.)

On May Day 2011 Laaninen delivered a May Day political speech near Kyösti Kallio's statue criticizing Teuvo Hakkarainen. He joined the critics and said in typical May Day political speech near Kyösti Kallio's statue in Helsinki, that Neekeriukko (Negro old man) was the worst insult. He also added, that he wonders, how is it possible, that Hakkarainen can apologise his sayings by claiming, that he comes from countryside. "Pahempaa loukkausta maalaisille ja maalla syntyneille on vaikea keksiä" (It is difficult to find a worse insult concerning the rural people and people, who have been born in the countryside). He also commented Hakkarainen's statements, that they are an "all time low" comment in the immigration debate.

Laaninen has become a baccalaureat in 1973 and Master of Science in administrative sciences in 1983.

Later Laaninen studied theology in university and received his master's degree of theology 2018. In the same year he began a two-year work as a priest in the congregation of Malmi, Helsinki.
