= Tim Wheeler (disambiguation) =

Tim Wheeler (born 1977) is a Northern Irish musician

Tim Wheeler may also refer to:

- Tim Wheeler (academic) (born 1950), British academic and former vice-chancellor of the University of Chester
- Tim Wheeler (baseball) (born 1988), American baseball player

== See also ==
- Tom Wheeler (born 1946), American businessman and politician
- Tom Wheeler (writer), American screenwriter and producer
