= Valeri Timofeev =

Latvian artist

- Born: 1941 (age 84–85)
- Occupation: Artist
- Known for: artist

Valeri Timofeev (Latvian: Valērijs Timofejevs; 1941–2014) was a Latvian artist. His works are being collected by Walters Art Museum, Smithsonian American Art Museum and Dallas Museum of Art.

== Early life and career ==
The artist moved to Russia in 1967 to pursue his interest and further education in arts. In 1993, he moved to the United States where his exhibits have garnered national praise.
