= Koillissanomat =

- Type: Newspaper
- Editor-in-chief: Petri Karjalainen
- Founded: 1950; 75 years ago
- Language: Finnish
- Circulation: 6,585 (2012)
- Website: Official website

Koillissanomat is a newspaper that is published by Koillissanomat Oy. It was established in 1950 and it is printed in Oulu, Finland.

The establisher was Reino Rinne. He also wrote in to newspaper with pseudonym Kitkalainen. Writer Arto Paasilinna was editor in chief after Reino in 1964–1965.

Circulation was 6585 in 2012 and it comes nowadays out 7 times per week on the Internet and 3 times per week as a paper and was delivered in the Koillismaa area to municipalities: Posio, Kuusamo and Taivalkoski.
