= Timoteo Ofrasio =

Filipino Jesuit priest and liturgist (1948–2020)

Timoteo Ofrasio S.J. S.L.D
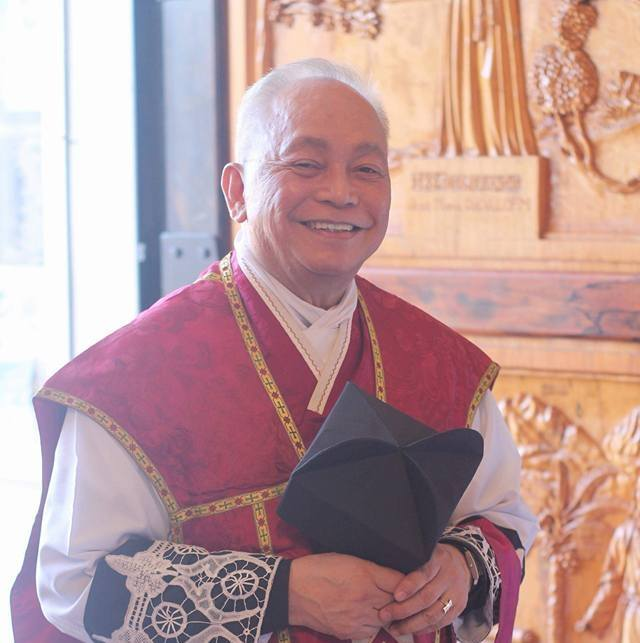
- Fr. Tim Ofrasio pictured at Our Lady of the Pillar Parish, Alaminos, Laguna - his hometown.
- Born: Timoteo Jose M. Ofrasio; August 5, 1948
- Died: December 1, 2020 (aged 72); San Pablo, Laguna, Philippines
- Occupations: Priest, Liturgist, Professor
- Known for: Liturgy, Seminary Formation
- Parent(s): Timoteo Ofrasio, Jr. and Dulce Macasadia
- Religion: Roman Catholic
- Ordained: 10 March 1979
- Congregations served: Society of Jesus
- Title: Reverend Father

Timoteo Jose "Tim" M. Ofrasio S.J., S.L.D. (August 5, 1948 – December 1, 2020) was a Filipino Jesuit priest and liturgist from Alaminos, Laguna.

== Biography ==
Ofrasio entered the Society of Jesus on 30 July 1969, and was ordained and became a priest on 10 March 1979.

Ofrasio was also a professor at the Loyola School of Theology (LST) at the Ateneo de Manila University in Quezon City where he taught systematic and sacramental theology. He was also an instructor in sacred theology. He obtained licentiate from the Pontificio Istituto Sant’Anselmo in Rome in 1987 and also completed a doctorate degree in sacred liturgy, also from the same institution in 1990 with the dissertation, Baptismal Images in Patristic and Liturgical Sources.

Ofrasio taught courses in Liturgy and the Sacraments at St. John Vianney Theological Seminary in Cagayan de Oro from 1986 to 2004, where he was Spiritual Director (1990–94), Vice-Rector (1994-1998) and Rector (1998–2004). Prior to special studies, he worked in the pastoral field as Associate Pastor of San José Manggagawa Parish in Marikina (1980–82), and Pastor of Our Lady of Perpetual Help Parish in Buug, Zamboanga del Sur (now Zamboanga Sibugay), Prelature (now Diocese) of Ipil (1982–84), and as Associate Pastor in Sacred Heart Parish in Cebu City (2007–08), teaching part time at Seminario Mayor de San Carlos. He was Regional Secretary for East Asia and Oceania (now East Asia and the Pacific) from 2004 to 2005. He was also part of the faculty at Paul VI Institute of Liturgy in Malaybalay from 1990 to 2020. Ofrasio joined LST as associate professor in 2008. He was Consultor of the Commission on Liturgy of the CBCP from 1994 to 1997, and Cagayan de Oro Archdiocesan Chair of the Commission on Liturgy from 1994 to 2000, and was consultant to the archdiocese on matters of church architecture.

Ofrasio was also known as the lyricist for behind many songs used in the liturgy like "Paghahandog ng Sarili" (lit. 'Presenting Oneself'), "Isang Bansa" (lit. 'One Country'), and "Panalangin sa Pagiging Bukas-Palad" (lit. 'Prayer for Being Charitable'). This also includes "Alay sa Diyos" (lit. 'Offering to God') which was used during the 2015 visit of Pope Francis to the Philippines. He was also an artist who did paintings and ink and pencil sketches. Ofrasio also gave the inspiration for the sampaguita chasuble used by Pope Francis during his visit to the Philippines.

Ofrasio died from COVID-19 at a hospital in San Pablo, Laguna, on 1 December 2020, aged 72, during the COVID-19 pandemic in the Philippines. He was buried at the Sacred Heart Novitiate and Retreat House in Novaliches, Quezon City, on 10 July 2021.
