= Tim Ward =

Tim Ward may refer to:

- Tim Ward (American football) (born 1997), American football player
- Tim Ward (cricketer) (born 1998), Australian cricketer
- Tim Ward (footballer) (1917–1993), English football manager and player
- Tim Ward (musician), American musician
- Tim Ward (racing driver) (born 1994), American racing driver
- Tim Ward (skater) (born 1978), Australian vert skater
- Tim Ward (soccer) (born 1987), American soccer player
- Tim Ward, developer of 68K/OS
