= Timofey =

Timofey (Russian: Тимофе́й) is a male Russian name derived from the Ancient Greek Timotheos (Τιμόθεος), meaning "honoring God". It is a Russian variant of the name Timothy.

The corresponding male patronymic is Timofeyevich (Тимофе́евич), and the female patronymic is Timofeyevna (Тимофе́евна).

== People ==
- Timofey Bancod (born 2009), Junior French Chess Champion
- Timofey Chalyy (born 1994), Russian athlete specialising in the 400 metres hurdles
- Timofey Granovsky (1813–1855), founder of medieval studies in the Russian Empire
- Timofey Khryukin (1910–1953), Soviet aviator
- Timofey Kiryanov (born 1970), Russian football player
- Timofey Kritsky (born 1987), Russian road cyclist
- Timofey Lapshin (born 1988), Russian biathlete
- Timofey Lebeshev (1905–1981), Soviet cinematographer
- Timofey Mikhailov (1859–1881), Russian boilermaker and assassin
- Timofey Mozgov (born 1986), Russian basketball player
- Timofey Prokofiev (1913–1944), Soviet marine infantryman
- Timofey Samsonov (1888–1955), Soviet politician and veteran of the Russian Civil War
- Timofey Skryabin (born 1967), Soviet boxer

== Other ==
- MT Timofey Guzhenko, a Russian icebreaking tanker

== See also ==
- Tymoteusz
- Timofeyev
- Timothy (name)
- Tim
- Timmy
- Timo
- Timotheus
- Timothée
- Timoteo
