= Vyacheslav Timchenko =

Vyacheslav Timchenko may refer to:

- Vyacheslav Timchenko (politician) (born 1955), Russian politician
- Vyacheslav Timchenko (ice hockey) (born 1971), Ukrainian ice hockey player
