= Lummer =

Lummer may refer to:

- Heinrich Lummer (1932–2019), German politician
- Otto Lummer (1860–1925), German physicist and researcher
- Lummer–Gehrcke interferometer, or Lummer–Gehrcke plate, a multiple-beam interferometer similar to the Fabry–Pérot etalon, but using light at a steep angle of incidence
