= Tim Williams (rock musician) =

Tim Williams Band
- Born: July 12, 1982 (age 43)
- Genres: Rock, Singer/Songwriter
- Instruments: Guitar, Piano
- Years active: 2009 - Present
- Label: Part Time Local Productions
- Website: www.timwilliams.com

Tim Williams is an indie-rock singer/songwriter currently based in Philadelphia, Pennsylvania. He has released one EP, one LP, one 3-song single, is the house musician for the National Radio Program MyFixitUpLife, has shared the stage with Of Monsters and Men, Gin Blossoms and Weezer, among others, through Radio 104.5, and has appeared in several national commercials, including ads for Stanley Steemer and Draft Kings.

He has performed with international acts Of Monsters and Men, Ryan Star, Goo Goo Dolls, Butch Walker, Better Than Ezra, Diane Birch, JJAMZ, Spin Doctors, Weezer, Howie Day, Gin Blossoms, Tristan Prettyman, Jenn Bostic, Jon McLaughlan, Marc Scibilia, Joshua Radin, Good Old War and Jeffrey Gaines. Springing to popularity in large part thanks to Radio 104.5, Mix 106.1 and Chio in the Morning, as well as iHeartMedia in Philadelphia, he is also the house musician for the National Radio Program MyFixitUpLife. With MyFixitUpLife, he has toured the nation with Extreme Makeover: Home Edition – most notably the show's 200th and final episode in Joplin, Missouri, in which Williams helped rebuild the tornado-ravaged community while playing music for the cast and volunteers.

Additional television appearances include The Food Network's Restaurant: Impossible, NBC's The 10! Show, "The Q" on Fox 29 Philadelphia and PHL17's Eye Opener. He was also seen in the Major Motion Picture Invincible. He has played music before Philadelphia Phillies home games at Citizens Bank Park.

He was a finalist in Wawa's Welcome America Singer/Songwriter Contest in 2011. His debut EP We Begin was released on July 1, 2009, and is available on iTunes. His second album and first full length, Blue Ribbon, was released on September 26, 2012. His third studio project, the 3-song single "Part Time Local", was released on August 12, 2016.

In 2017, Tim Williams officially rebranded his band as the Tim Williams Band.

In 2018, the Tim Williams Band performed with Eddie Money at a private event in Pennsylvania.

In 2019, the Tim Williams Band performed with Art Alexakis of Everclear at a private event in Pennsylvania.

== Discography ==
- We Begin (2009)
- Blue Ribbon (2012)
- Part Time Local (2016)
