= Tim (inhabited locality) =

Tim (Russian: Тим) is the name of several inhabited localities in Russia.

- Tim, Kursk Oblast, a work settlement in Timsky District of Kursk Oblast
- Tim, Oryol Oblast, a village in Dubrovsky Selsoviet of Dolzhansky District of Oryol Oblast
