= Telecommunication Instructional Modeling System =

Electronic telecommunications device

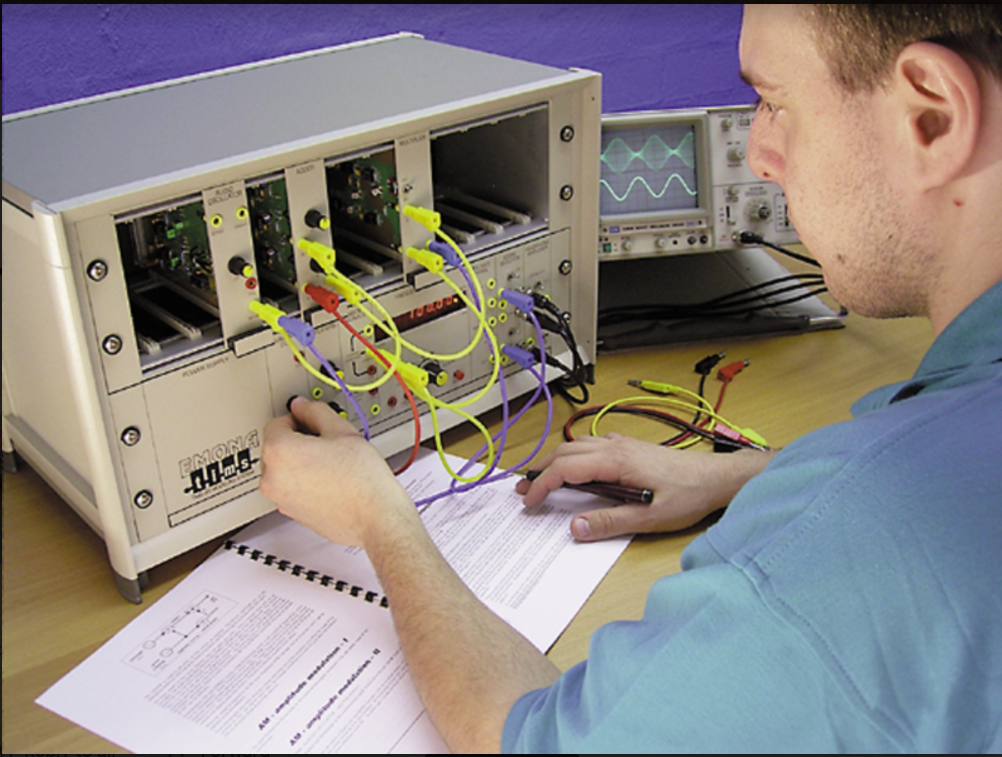
- EMONA TIMS301 with student
- Type: Telecommunications Training Device
- Inventor: Tim Hooper
- Inception: 1971
- Manufacturer: Emona
- Available: Yes
- Website: https://www.emona-tims.com/

TIMS, or Telecommunication Instructional Modeling System, is an electronic device invented by Tim Hooper and developed by Australian engineering company Emona Instruments that is used as a telecommunications trainer in educational settings and universities.

== History ==
TIMS was designed at the University of New South Wales by Tim Hooper in 1971. It was developed to run student experiments for electrical engineering communications courses. Hooper’s concept was developed into the current TIMS model in the late 1980s. In 1986, the project won a competition organized by Electronics Australia for development work using the Texas Instruments TMS320. Emona Instruments also received an award for TIMS at the fifth Secrets of Australian ICT Innovation Competition.

== Methodology ==
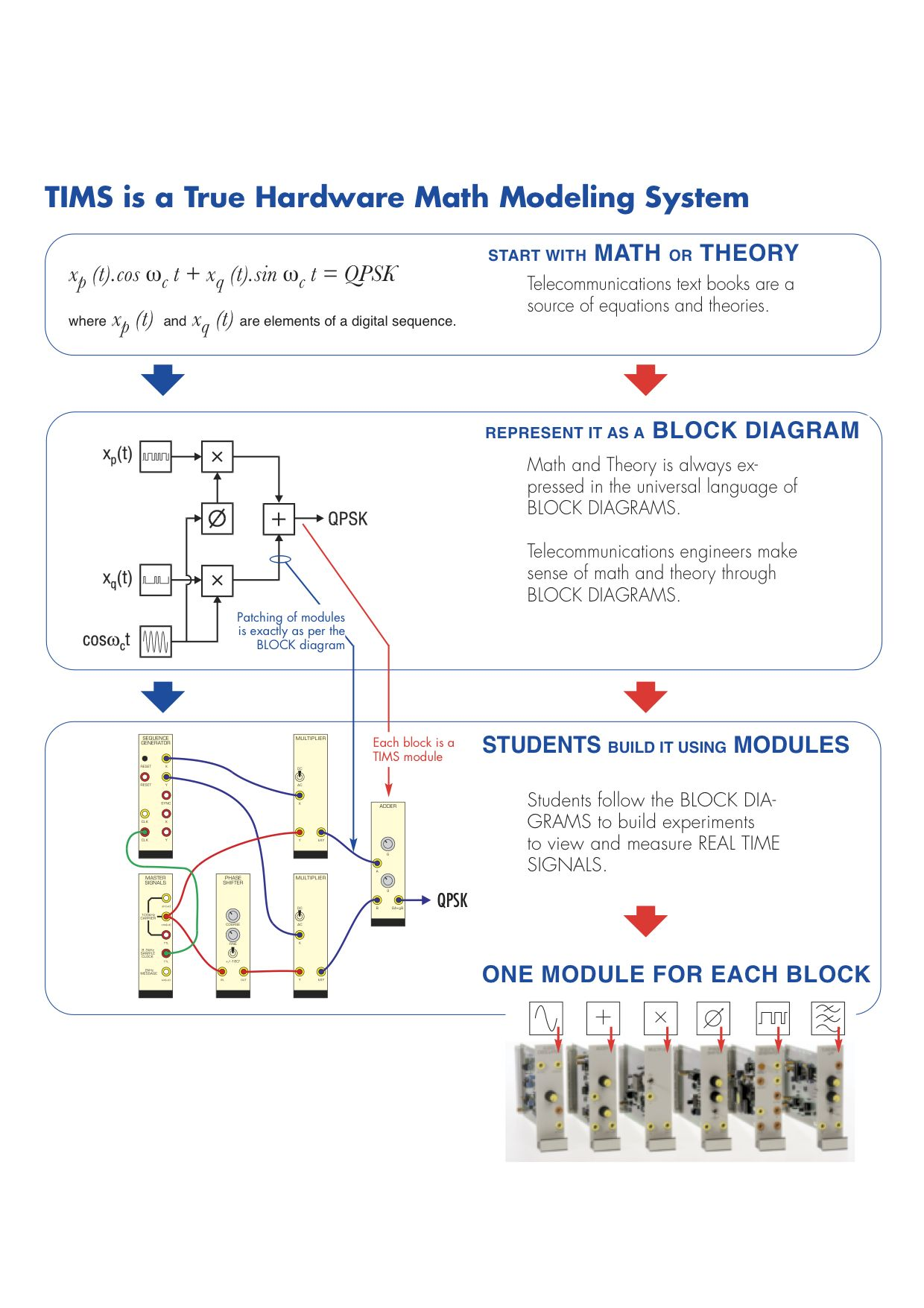
TIMS Methodology Diagram

TIMS uses a block diagram-based interface for experiments in the classroom. It can model mathematical equations to simulate electric signals, or it can use block diagrams to simulate telecommunications systems. It uses a different hardware card to represent functions for each block of the diagram.

TIMS consists of a server, a chassis, and boards that can emulate the configurations of a telecommunications system. It uses electronic circuits as modules to simulate the components of analog and digital communications systems. The modules can perform different functions such as signal generation, signal processing, signal measurement, and digital signal processing.

=== Variants ===
The block diagram approach to modeling the mathematics of a telecommunication system has also been ported across to other domains.

=== Simulation ===
Where the blocks are patched together onscreen to mimic the hardware implementation but with a simulation engine (known as TutorTIMS).

=== Remote access ===
It can be used by multiple students at once across the internet or LAN via a browser based client screen. This utilises a statistical time division multiplexing architecture in the control unit. The method is applied both to Telecommunications and Electronics Laboratories (known as netCIRCUITlabs).
