= Tim Pargent =

German politician (born 1993)

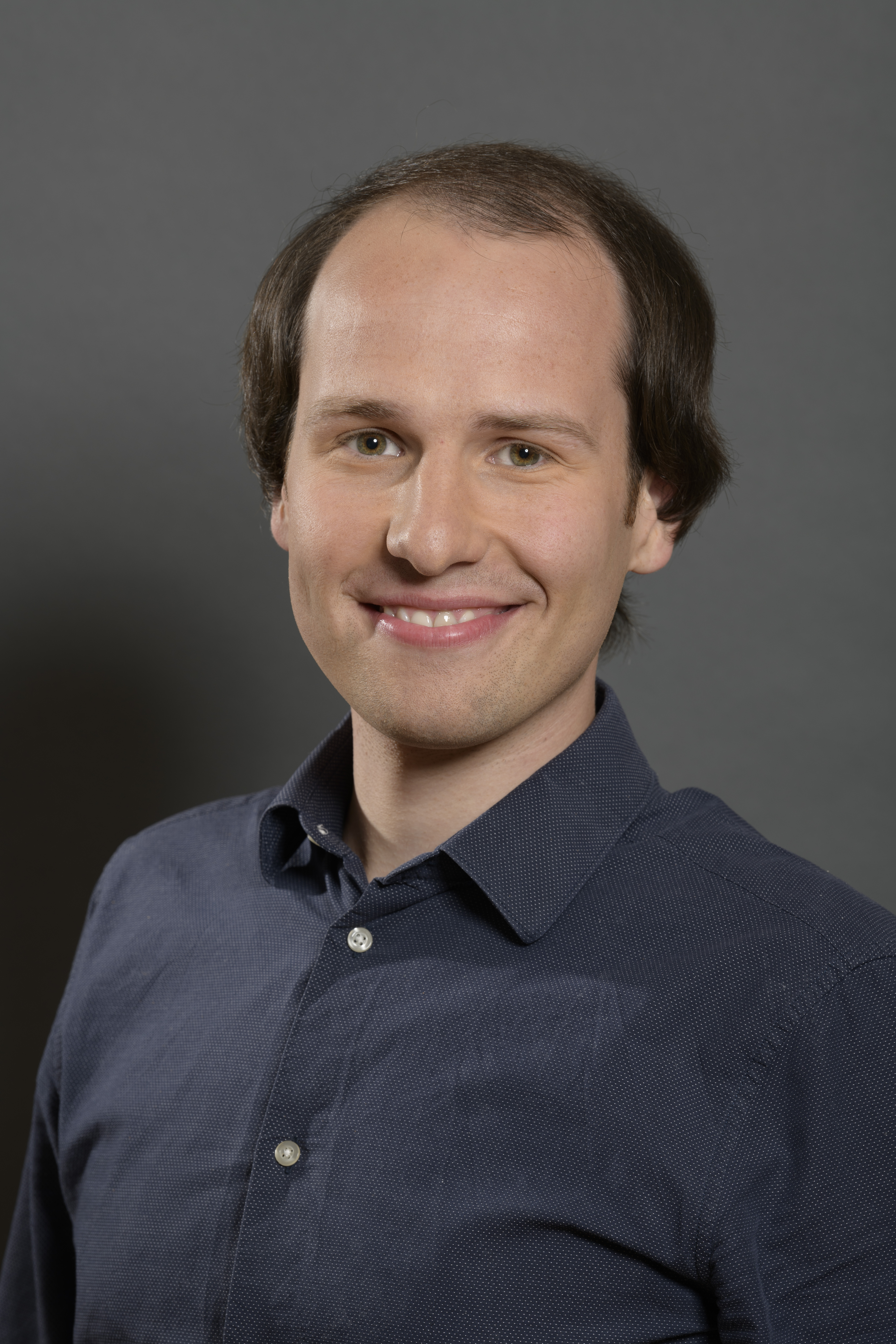
- Pargent in 2018

Member of the Landtag of Bavaria
- Incumbent
- Assumed office 5 November 2018
- Constituency: Upper Franconia

Personal details
- Born: 7 June 1993 (age 33)
- Party: Alliance 90/The Greens (since 2010)

Tim Pargent (born 7 June 1993) is a German politician serving as a member of the Landtag of Bavaria since 2018. He has served as deputy group leader of Alliance 90/The Greens since 2019.
