= Tim Wulff =

German footballer (born 1987)

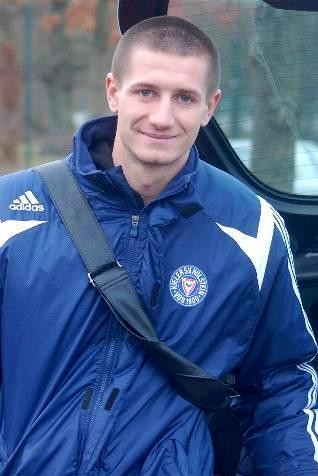
- Wulff in 2009

Personal information
- Date of birth: 20 June 1987 (age 39)
- Place of birth: Schleswig, West Germany
- Height: 1.86 m (6 ft 1 in)
- Position: Centre-forward

Team information
- Current team: Weiche Flensburg II
- Number: 17

Youth career
- Rendsburger TSV
- Büdelsdorfer TSV

Senior career*
Years	Team	Apps	(Gls)
2005–2006	Büdelsdorfer TSV		
2006–2012	Holstein Kiel II	47	(29)
2006–2012	Holstein Kiel	94	(26)
2012–2020	Weiche Flensburg	207	(59)
2018–	Weiche Flensburg II	4	(0)
- * Club domestic league appearances and goals as of 16:59, 3 March 2021 (UTC)

Tim Wulff (born 20 June 1987) is a German footballer who plays as a centre-forward for Weiche Flensburg II.

== Career ==
Wulff made his professional debut in the 3. Liga for Holstein Kiel on 25 July 2009, coming on as a substitute in the 71st minute for Francky Sembolo in a 2–0 away loss against Jahn Regensburg.
