= Timothy Doner =

American hyperpolyglot and analyst

- Born: October 25, 1995 (age 31); Manhattan, New York City, U.S.
- Education: Dalton School; Harvard University; University of Cambridge

Timothy "Tim" Doner (born October 25, 1995) is an American hyperpolyglot, former social media personality, and a former analyst at the Washington-based Center for Advanced Defense Studies, specializing in the Middle East and Central Asia. A graduate of Harvard University and the University of Cambridge, he rose to prominence at the age of 16 when he released a YouTube video in 2012 in which he spoke 20 different languages.

== Early life and education ==
Timothy Doner was born to entertainment lawyer Ezra Doner and writer Betsy Israel on October 25, 1995 in Manhattan, New York City, United States. Tim's prelude to learning languages apparently began at the age of 13 when he started teaching himself Hebrew out of interest in 2009 after memorizing the lyrics of his favorite funk band Hadag Nahash. He then moved to Arabic and other languages, like Persian, Pashto, Hindi, Indonesian, Wolof, Hausa, Swahili, Xhosa, Ojibwe, Dutch, and Italian. Doner studied at the Dalton School.

== Languages ==
The languages that Doner has publicly displayed that he can speak, fluently or not, are these, in no particular order.

List of languages Doner has been shown to speak
Language	Source
English (native language)	
French	
Yiddish	
Hebrew	
Kurdish	
Arabic	
Persian	
Turkish	
Dutch	
German	
Pashto	
Mandarin Chinese	
Swahili	
Hausa	
Ojibwe	
Indonesian	
Italian	
Hindi	
Russian	
Wolof	

== Personal life ==
During a short interview on the Australian breakfast show program Sunrise, Doner revealed that Persian is one of his favorite languages and is fond of reading the works of 14th-century Iranian poet Hafez-e-Shirazi.
