= Sergei Timofeyev (footballer, born 1970) =

Russian footballer (1970–1997)

Personal information
- Full name: Sergei Vasilyevich Timofeyev
- Date of birth: 28 March 1970
- Place of birth: Lyubertsy, Russian SFSR
- Date of death: 21 November 1997 (aged 27)
- Place of death: Lyubertsy, Russia
- Height: 1.75 m (5 ft 9 in)
- Positions: Forward; midfielder

Senior career*
Years	Team	Apps	(Gls)
1986–1988	FC Spartak Moscow	0	(0)
1989	PFC CSKA Moscow	1	(0)
1989	FC Chaika-CSKA Moscow	7	(0)
1990–1991	DAC Dunajská Streda	4	(0)
1992–1994	FC Augsburg	11	(2)
1994	FC Torpedo Moscow	3	(0)
1995	FC Lokomotiv Nizhny Novgorod	0	(0)
1995	FC Orekhovo Orekhovo-Zuyevo	17	(2)
1997	FC Spartak-Orekhovo Orekhovo-Zuyevo	24	(1)
- * Club domestic league appearances and goals

Sergei Vasilyevich Timofeyev (Russian: Серге́й Васильевич Тимофеев; 28 March 1970 – 21 November 1997) was a Russian professional association footballer.
