= Timo Joensuu =

Finnish oncologist (born 1959)

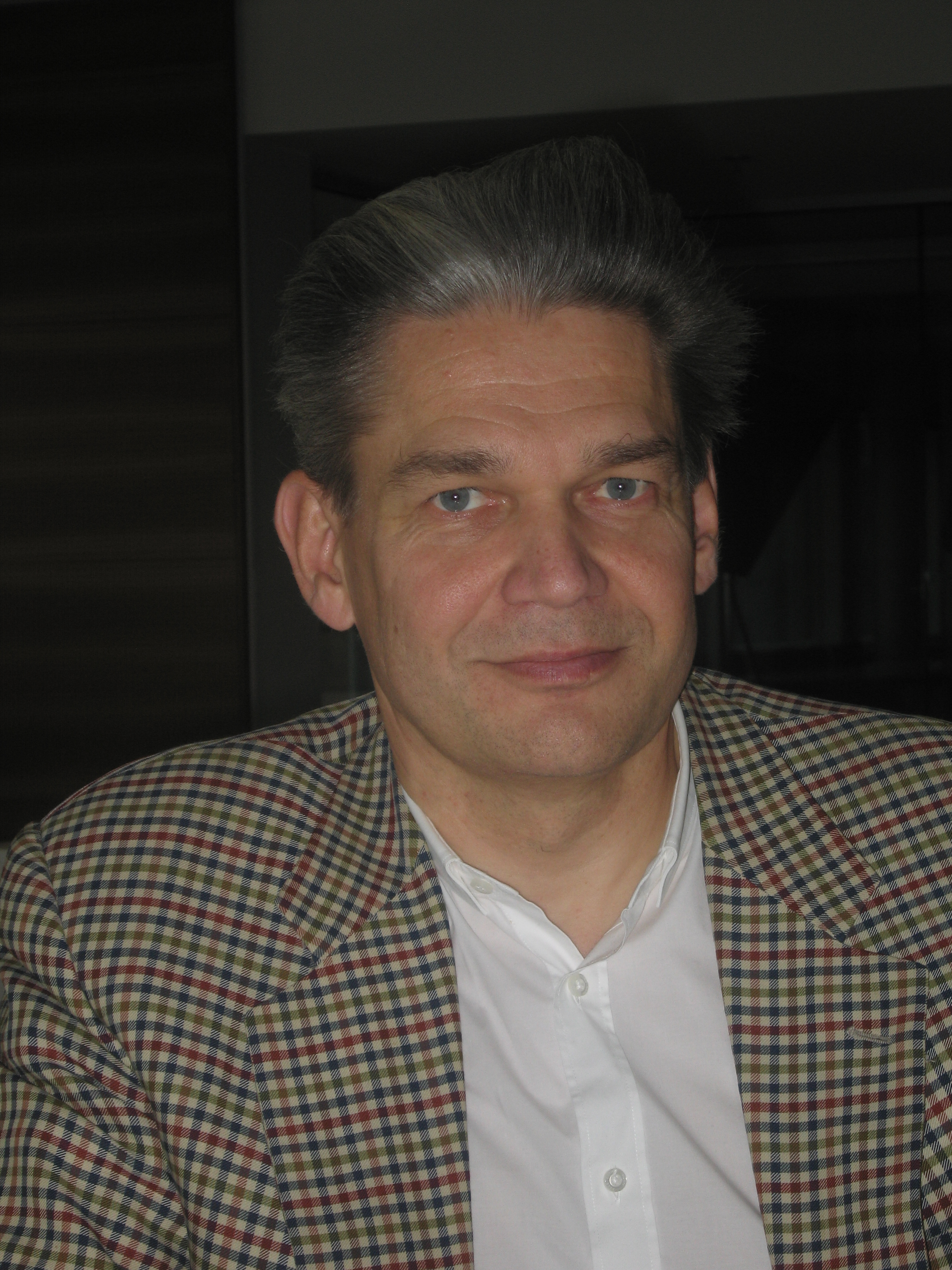
- Born: February 27, 1959 (age 66); Nokia, Finland

Timo Joensuu (born 27 February 1959 in Nokia, Finland) is a Finnish oncologist, associate professor of clinical oncology in University of Helsinki, researcher of new cancer treatments and developer of an internationally new hospital concept. He is a co-founder of Docrates Cancer Center in Helsinki and was its clinical director until 2014, after which he has been concentrating mostly on clinical work with the patients as the chief oncologist.

Dr Joensuu studied medicine in the University of Tampere. He graduated MBBS and qualified professional MD 1986 and presented his doctoral thesis on cytodifferentiation in 1992. 1991–1993 he had a research fellowship in INSERM (Institut national de la santé et de la recherche médicale) in Paris. Joensuu specialized in oncology, radio therapy in Helsinki University Hospital where he worked 1991–2007. He has also been medical advisor for AstraZeneca and for Helsinki Consulting Group and World Bank in Serbia year 2004. Since 2007 he is the clinical director of Docrates Cancer Center and member of the board of directors of the company.

Dr Joensuu has led several clinical trials and published articles on oncolytic adenovirus therapy, radiotherapy, chemoradiotherapy and prostate cancer. Dr Joensuu was the first doctor in Nordic countries to use IMRT (Intensity-modulated radiation therapy).

At Docrates Cancer Center Dr Joensuu was especially devoted to the development of target radiotherapy, research and clinical trials. Dr.Joensuu has been on the Prostate Cancer Organisation Propo's board and participated in different international cancer research organizations as an expert. Dr Joensuus's vision is a fast track path from diagnosis to treatment, founded on the belief that cancer care can be carried out different way compared to traditional models.
