= Sergei Timofeyev (footballer, born 1981) =

Russian footballer

Personal information
- Full name: Sergei Vladimirovich Timofeyev
- Date of birth: 26 June 1981 (age 45)
- Height: 1.85 m (6 ft 1 in)
- Position: Defender

Youth career
- DYuSSh-11 Volgograd
- FC Rotor Volgograd

Senior career*
Years	Team	Apps	(Gls)
1998–2003	FC Rotor Volgograd	1	(0)
1998–2000	→ FC Rotor-d Volgograd (loans)	73	(0)
2004	FC Ekibastuzets	21	(0)
2006	FC Tekstilshchik Kamyshin	24	(0)
2007	FC Tsement Mikhaylovka (amateur)		
- * Club domestic league appearances and goals

Sergei Vladimirovich Timofeyev (Russian: Сергей Владимирович Тимофеев; born 26 June 1981 in Volgograd) is a former Russian football player.
