= Tymoshenko =

Tymoshenko (Ukrainian: Тимошенко, romanized: Tymošenko), Timoshenko (Russian: Тимошенко), or Tsimashenka/Cimašenka (Belarusian: Цімашэнка) is a surname of Ukrainian origin. It derives from the Christian name Timothy, and its Ukrainian derivatives, Tymofiy or Tymish. The surname, Tymoshenko, was created by adding the Ukrainian patronymic suffix, -enko, meaning someone of Tymish, usually the son of Tymish.

== Notable people ==
=== Tymoshenko ===
- Eugenia Tymoshenko (born 1980), Ukrainian businesswoman, daughter of Yulia
- Illya Tymoshenko (born 1999), Ukrainian footballer
- Kyrylo Tymoshenko (born 1989), Ukrainian statesman
- Luda Tymoshenko (born 1978), Ukrainian artist
- Maksym Tymoshenko (born 1972), Ukrainian culturologist and social activist
- Oleksandr Tymoshenko (born 1960), Ukrainian businessman, husband of Yulia
- Olexandra Tymoshenko (born 1972), Soviet-Ukrainian rhythmic gymnast
- Yulia Tymoshenko (born 1960), former Prime Minister of Ukraine

=== Timoshenko ===
- Daria Timoshenko (born 1980), Russian-Azerbaijani figure skater
- Georgy Timoshenko (born 1966), Ukrainian chess grandmaster
- Semyon Timoshenko (1895–1970), Soviet-Ukrainian military commander
- Stephen Timoshenko (1878–1972), Russian-Ukrainian engineer
- Yevgeniy Timoshenko (born 1988), Ukrainian-American poker player

=== Tsimashenka ===
- Alyaksey Tsimashenka (born 1986), Belarusian footballer

== See also ==
- Eastern Slavic naming customs
- Murder of Russel Timoshenko, incident in which a 23-year-old NYPD officer was shot and killed during a traffic stop.
- Timoshenko Medal, awarded for contributions in applied mechanics.
- Timoshenko beam theory
- Timoleón Jiménez (nicknamed Timochenko), Colombian FARC commander.
