= Tymon =

Tymon is a surname and male given name. Notable people with this name include:

== Surname ==
- Angelle Tymon (born 1983), American broadcast journalist and game show host
- Josh Tymon (born 1999), English football player

== Given name ==
- Tymon Dogg, English musician
- Tymon Kolasiński, Polish speedcuber
- Tymon Mabaleka (1949–2014), Zimbabwean football player and music producer
- Tymon Tytus Chmielecki (born 1965), Polish Catholic prelate
- Tymon Zaborowski (1799–1828), Polish poet
- Tymon de Weger (1955 in Delft), Dutch politician
- Tymon Zygmuntowicz, Polish steeplechase athlete

== Other ==
- Tymon Park, Dublin, Ireland

== See also ==
- Timon, name
