= The Adventures of Timothy Pilgrim =

The Adventures of Timothy Pilgrim is a children's television serial consisting of ten 15-minute installments which originally aired in 1975 on Canada's TVOntario and was rerun countless times afterward over the next decade on TVO as well as on other Canadian educational channels and PBS.

== Plot ==
The title character is a shoeshine boy who travels back 100 years in time by means of a magic trunk and meets Zachariah Gibson, a travelling salesman and showman who peddles elixirs and tonics. Episodes are based on the pair's travels between the worlds of the 1870s and 1970s.

Both characters face challenges in their respective times - Timothy is an orphan who squats in an abandoned warehouse and makes a living shining shoes and doing odd jobs at a neighbourhood diner owned by Wilma. He is bullied by the neighbourhood thug, Barney, who demands $5 from Timothy for the right to work on "his" corner. He is also friends with Ol' Coop, a cobbler.

Zachariah Gibson is a travelling salesman who sells medicinal cure-all elixirs of dubious quality out of his wagon. However, he is stuck on the land of a hostile property owner as a wagon wheel needs repairing and his horse has either run off or been stolen. Zachariah feels that people don't like him and that he cannot trust anyone.

The two form an unlikely bond across time that teaches Zachariah the value of friendship.

== Production ==
The show's 1970s scenes were filmed in Toronto's west end on King Street and in abandoned factories and warehouses in and around what is now Liberty Village. The 19th century scenes were shot in Kleinburg, Westfield Heritage Village in Rockton, Ontario and at the Helliwell House of Todmorden Mills in Toronto.

== Cast ==
- Joey Davidson - Timothy Pilgrim
- David Hemblen - Zachariah Gibson
- Jack Mather - Ol' Coop
- Arlene Meadows - Wilma
- Paul Culliton - Barney

== Episodes ==
1. Zachariah Gibson's Magic Trunk
2. Escape to the Future
3. Past Meets Present
4. The Missing Half-Penny
5. Trapped in the Past
6. A Thief at Large
7. The Escaped Prisoner
8. Zachariah's Pioneer Remedy
9. Did Barney Do It?
10. Returning Home
