= Tymon de Weger =

Dutch politician

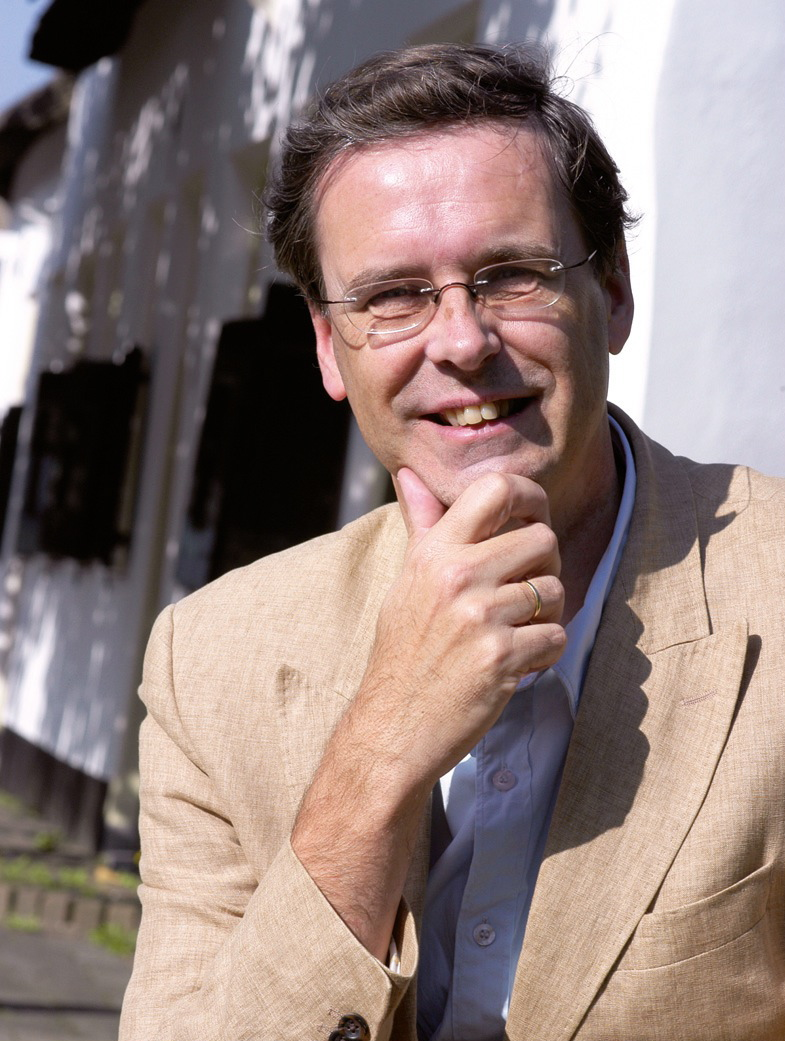
Tymon de Weger

Tymon de Weger (born 1955 in Delft) is a Dutch politician.

De Weger was an Alderman of Enschede, Utrecht and Breukelen.
