= Timo Lumme =

Timo Lumme (born 13 June 1961) is the former Managing Director of the IOC television and Marketing Services of the International Olympic Committee (IOC). He was responsible for the IOC's Global Sponsorship Program.

== Life ==
He studied law at King's College London. He moved to Amsterdam for 3 years in 1997 to work as the European Sports Marketing Director for Nike. He then moved back to England in 2000 to work for ESPN. He moved to Vaud, Switzerland in 2004 to work for the IOC.

=== Family ===
Timo Lumme married an English woman, Nicola Driver, in 1997. He now has a son and a daughter, born in 1998 and 2000.
