= Timoti =

Timoti is a male given name. In the Māori language, it is a transliteration of the name Timothy. Notable people with the name include:

- Timoti Džon Bajford (1941–2014), Serbian form of Timothy John Byford, English-Serbian author and director
- Tīmoti Kāretu (born 1937), New Zealand Māori-language scholar
