= Tijs =

Origin
- Meaning: "gift of God" (Matthew) or "honouring God" (Timothy)
- Region of origin: Netherlands, ultimately Greek, Hebrew

Tijs is a Dutch male given name. It can be a derivative form of Matthijs, which is the Dutch form of Matthew or Matthias, or a short form of Timothijs or Timotheus, Dutch forms of Timothy. Another spelling of this name is Thijs.

It may refer to:

- Tijs Goldschmidt (born 1953), Dutch writer and evolutionary biologist
- Tijs Tinbergen (born c. 1947), Dutch filmmaker
- Tiësto (born Tijs Michiel Verwest, 1969), Dutch DJ
