= Timothy (given name) =

Given name most often associated with males

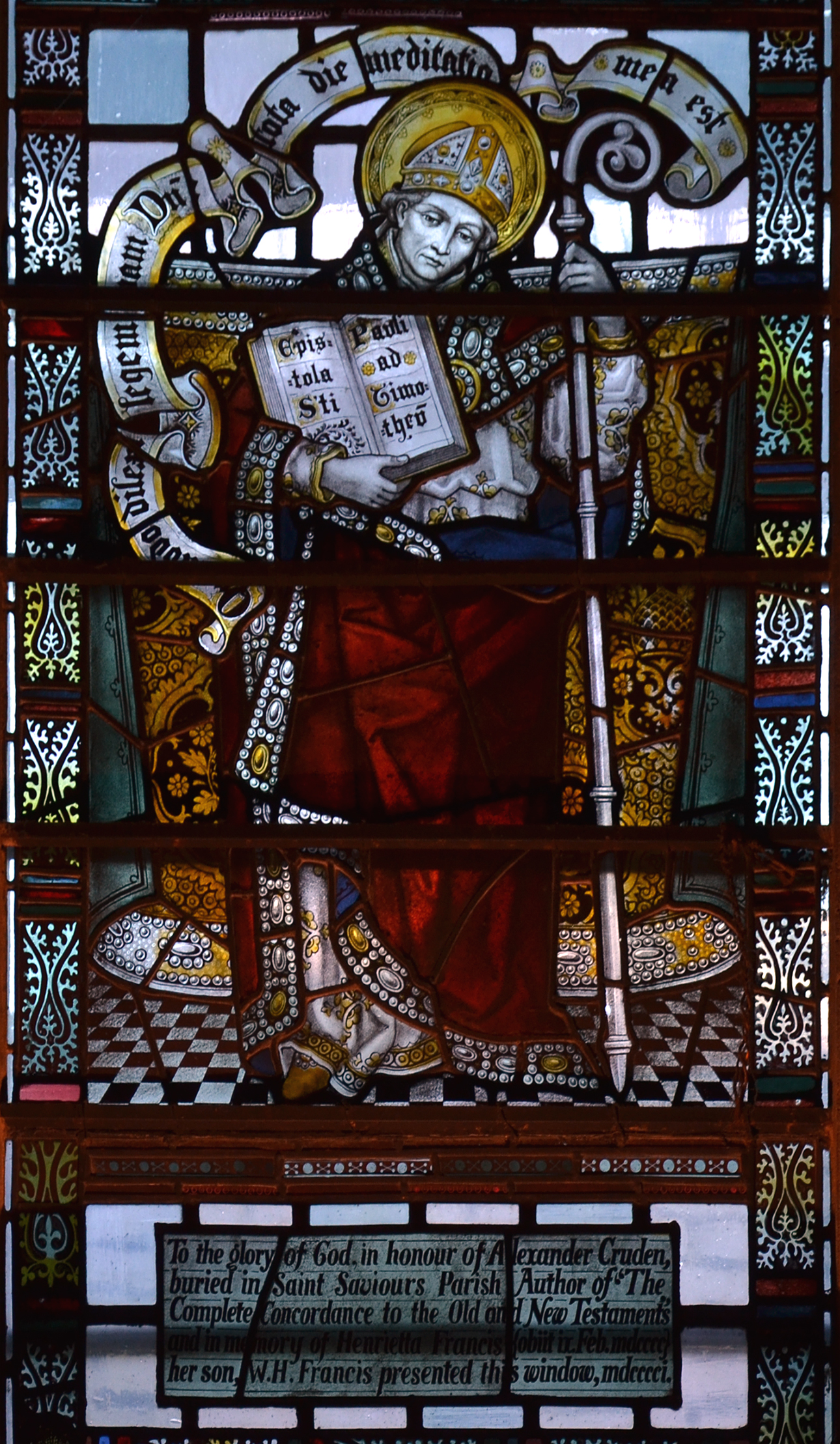
- Saint Timotheus
- Pronunciation: /ˈtɪməθi/
- Gender: Male

Origin
- Origin: Greek name Τιμόθεος
- Meaning: "Honouring God" or "Honoured by God"

Other names
- Nicknames: Timmy, Timo, Timbo
- Related names: Tim, Timo, Timofey, Tymish, Timotej, Timotey, Timoteo, Timotheus, Tymoteusz, Timothée

Timothy is a masculine name. It is a version of the Greek name Τιμόθεος (Timόtheos) meaning 'one who honours God', from τιμή 'honour' and θεός 'god'. Timothy (and its variations) is a common name in several countries.

In the United States, the name was most popular in the 1960s, ranking 13th among all boys' names. Popularity for the name has since declined, with its latest rating of #208 in 2024. The name has been used for girls, having a peak in 1968, ranking 908 in the United States, and has declined since, making it a very rare name for girls.

== People named Timothy ==
=== Religion ===
- Timothy of Ammon (2nd century BC), Ammonite general
- Saint Timothy, 1st-century Christian bishop whose name is associated with two books of the New Testament
- Timothy (died 178), companion of Symphorian, Christian martyr
- Timothy of Constantinople (7th century), Christian priest and writer
- Timothy (bishop of Zagreb) (died 1287)
- Timothy of Faras (fl. 1372), Nubian bishop
- Timothy Drew (Prophet Noble Drew Ali; 1886–1929), American religious leader, founder of the "Moorish Science Temple of America"
- Timothy Ware (1934–2022), monastic name Kallistos Ware, Metropolitan of Diokleia in Phrygia, an Orthodox assistant bishop in the UK
- Timothy Dolan (born 1950), American Roman Catholic cardinal, Archbishop of New York (2009–2025), and writer
- Timothy Kwok (born 1959), Hong Kong-born Anglican bishop

Patriarchs of Constantinople

- Timothy I of Constantinople (died 523)
- Timothy II of Constantinople (died 1620)

Patriarchs of Alexandria

- Timothy I of Alexandria (died 384)
- Timothy II of Alexandria (died 477), also known as Timotheus Aelurus, monophysite
- Timothy III Salophakiolos (died 481), Greek Orthodox Patriarch of Alexandria 460–475 and 477–485
- Timothy IV of Alexandria (died 535), also known as Timothy III, since the Coptic Church does not recognize Timothy III Salophakiolos

Patriarchs of Seleucia-Ctesiphon

- Timothy I of Seleucia-Ctesiphon, patriarch of the Church of the East, 780–823
- Timothy II of Seleucia-Ctesiphon, patriarch of the Church of the East, 1318 – c. 1332

=== Sports ===
- Timothy Chandler (born 1990), American professional soccer player
- Timothy Cheruiyot, Kenyan middle-distance runner specialising in the 1500 metres
- Timothy Castagne (born 1995), Belgian professional soccer player
- Timothy Disken, Australian paralympic swimmer
- Timothy Fok, President of the Hong Kong Football Association
- Timothy Fosu-Mensah (born 1998), Dutch professional soccer player
- Timothy Foli, American baseball player and coach
- Timothy Goebel, American figure skater
- Timothy Henry Henman, British professional tennis player
- Timothy Hodge, Australian Paralympic swimmer
- Timothy LeDuc, American pair skater
- Timothy Liljegren (born 1999), Swedish ice hockey defenceman
- Timothy Lowndes, Australian sport shooter
- Timothy Maloney, Australian wheelchair basketball player
- Timothy Masters (rower), Australian rower
- Timothy Matthews (born 1974), Australian Paralympic athlete
- Timothy McIsaac, Canadian Paralympic swimmer
- Timothy McKernan, American figure skater
- Timothy Peters, NASCAR driver
- Timothy Phillips, known as Tim Phillips, American competition swimmer
- Timothy Putt (born 1998), Australian water polo player
- Timothy Raines, American baseball player and coach
- Timothy Seaman, American race walker
- Timothy Soares (born 1997), American-Brazilian basketball player for Ironi Ness Ziona B.C. of the Israeli Basketball Premier League
- Timothy Tillman (born 1999), American professional soccer player
- Timothy Weah (born 2000), American professional soccer player
- Timothy Wynn (born 1985), Australian rugby league footballer

=== Arts ===
- Timothy Adams, American actor and model
- Timothy Bottoms, American actor
- Timothy Busfield, American actor
- Timothy Carlton, English actor
- Timothy Dalton, Welsh-born English actor
- Timothy Fadek, American photographer
- Timothy Farrell (1922–1989), American actor
- Timothy Granaderos (born 1986), American actor and model
- Timothy Hutton, American actor
- Timothy Kirkpatrick, American drummer
- Timothy Leary, American writer, psychologist, and psychedelic drug advocate
- Timothy Francis Lee, British rapper known as Yxngxr1
- Timothy Z. Mosley (Timbaland), record producer and rapper
- Timothy Patrick Murphy, American actor
- Timothy V. Murphy, Irish actor
- Timothy Olyphant, American actor
- Timothy Omundson, American actor
- Timothy J. Rice-Oxley, songwriter and keyboard player in British band Keane
- Timothy B. Schmit American musician
- Timothy Smith, Australian DJ and electronic music producer known as Timmy Trumpet
- Timothy Spall, English actor
- Timothy Van Laar, American artist, writer, and professor
- Timothy James Webb, Australian artist
- Timothy Wilcots, American drag performer also known as Latrice Royale

=== Politics ===
- Timothy Copeland, American politician
- Timothy Farrar (1747–1849), justice of the New Hampshire Supreme Court
- Timothy Groseclose, American political scientist and economist
- Timothy Guerrette, American politician
- Timothy Pickering, politician from Massachusetts who served as the third United States Secretary of State
- Timothy Pilgrim, Australian Privacy Commissioner and Australian Information Commissioner
- Timothy Quill, Irish politician
- Timothy Twombly, American politician

=== Other ===
- Timothy J. Broderick (born 1964), American physician and university professor
- Timothy Ray Brown (1966–2020), the Berlin Patient, the first person in the world to be cured of HIV
- Timothy Chambers, American philosopher
- Timothy Creamer (born 1959), American astronaut
- Timothy J. Cunningham (1982–2018), formerly missing person
- Timothy Dexter (1748–1806), American businessman
- Timothy Doner (born 1995), American polyglot and foreign policy analyst
- Timothy Egan (born 1954), American journalist
- Timothy Ha (born 1937), former Supervisor and Principal of St. Paul's College, Hong Kong and Education Secretary of the Hong Kong Sheng Kung Hui
- Timothy Kopra (born 1963), American astronaut
- Timothy McCoy (1955–1972), American murder victim who was killed by John Wayne Gacy
- Timothy McVeigh (1968–2001), the terrorist convicted of the Oklahoma City bombing
- Timothy Mo (born 1950), British Asian novelist
- Tiff Needell (born 1951), also known as Timothy Tiff Needell, a UK television presenter
- Timothy Peake (born 1972), British test pilot and astronaut
- Timothy Snyder (born 1969), American author and historian
- Timothy Tong (born 1949), former commissioner for the Independent Commission Against Corruption of Hong Kong
- Timothy Treadwell (1957–2003), grizzly bear enthusiast
- Timothy Wong Man-kong, historian from Hong Kong

=== Fictional characters ===
- Timothy Batterson, a character in Ninjago
- Timothy Claypole, a character from Rentaghost
- Timothy Lumsden, the lead character in Sorry! (TV series)
- Timothy Heppner, a character from the 2020 Andrew Unger novel Once Removed
- Reverend Timothy Lovejoy, a character from The Simpsons
- Timothy McGee, a character from NCIS
- Timothy Q. Mouse, a character from the 1941 Disney film Dumbo
- Timothy Twostroke, a character in the Pixar film Cars
- Timothy Wright, a character in the alternate reality game Marble Hornets
- the title character of Timothy Goes to School, a animated television series
- Timothy "Tiny Tim" Cratchit, a character from the 1843 novella A Christmas Carol by Charles Dickens
- Timothy Pilgrim, the titular character from the 1975 TVOntario series The Adventures of Timothy Pilgrim
- Timothy Jackson "Tim" Drake/Wayne (Robin) (Red Robin) a character from DC
- Timothy Aloysius Cadwallader "Dum Dum" Dugan is a character in various Marvel Universes
- Timothy "Tim" Bradford, one of the main characters from the ABC Show The Rookie

=== Surname ===
- Christopher Timothy (born 1940), Welsh actor
- Miriam Timothy (1879–1950), British harpist
- Nick Timothy (born 1980), British political adviser

== Disambiguations ==
- Tim (disambiguation)
- Timoti
- Timothy Brown (disambiguation), multiple people

== See also ==
- Tymoteusz
- Tim
- Timmy
- Timo
- Timotheus
- Timothée
- Timofey
- Timoteo (given name)
