= Bredin =

Bredin is a surname. Notable people with the surname include:

- Andrew Bredin (born 1962), English cricketer
- Bala Bredin (1916–2005), British Army officer
- Correne Bredin (born 1980), Canadian ice hockey player
- Edgar Craven Bredin (1886–1950), Irish mechanical and locomotive engineer, later a railway manager
- Frédérique Bredin (born 1956), French politician
- Gary Bredin (born 1948), Canadian ice hockey player
- Jane Bredin (1959–2011), equestrian
- Jean-Denis Bredin (1929–2021), French lawyer
- Patricia Bredin (1935–2023), British actress, the first UK entry in the Eurovision Song Contest
- Roger Bredin (born 1953), Swedish curler
- Stéphane Bredin (born 1976), French civil servant
- William Bredin (1862–1942), Canadian politician and pioneer

== See also ==
- Bredin, Alberta, municipal district in northwestern Alberta, Canada
- Breddin
- St Mary Bredin church in Canterbury, England
