= Ana Anderson =

American researcher and immunologist

Ana Carrizosa Anderson
- Born: Bogotá
- Education: Harvard University; University of Miami
- Scientific career
- Workplaces: Harvard University
- Thesis: T cell cross-reactivity in the selection and expansion of the autoreactive T cell repertoire (1999)
- Website: Ana Anderson Lab

Ana Carrizosa Anderson is a Colombian-American microbiologist who is a professor at the Harvard Medical School. Her research combines transcriptomics and systems biology to understand T-cell response to chronic disease.

== Early life and education ==
Anderson was born in Bogotá. She grew up in Miami, and eventually attended the University of Miami. Anderson studied microbiology and immunology as an undergraduate degree. She moved to Harvard University for her doctoral research in immunology, where she studied T cell cross reactivity.

== Research and career ==
Anderson looks to understand the pathways that are involved with T cell response to chronic disease. She has explored the role of regulatory T cells in cancer, and the specific effector T cells in tumor tissue. Her research combines mass cytometry, transcriptomics, and genome editing. Checkpoint receptors regulate the activation, differentiation and function of T-cells. They are up-regulated (e.g. increases response) on activated T cells to mitigate for uncontrolled inflammation. Immune checkpoint receptors are hijacked in cancer, where their high rates of expression on tumor T cells hampers the anti-tumor response. Anderson has investigated TIM-3, an immune checkpoint receptor that is involved with immunity to tumors. The blockade of immune checkpoint receptors is a recognized form of cancer treatment. Anderson is interested in how TIM-3 is involved with regulating tumor tissue immune cells, and understanding how the blockade impacts immune cell function in the tumor microenvironment.

Anderson uses transcriptomics technologies and systems biology to understand dysfunctional T-cells.

Anderson looks to understand the function of Treg in tumor tissue. CD4^{+}FoxP3^{+} Treg are immunosuppressive cells that suppress anti-tumor immunity. Inside tumor cells, Treg cells up-regulate checkpoint receptors and are major suppressors of anti-tumor immunity. The Treg cells that infiltrate tumor tissue up-regulate immune checkpoint receptors and have a highly suppressive phenotype.

== Selected publications ==
- Chen Zhu; Ana C Anderson; Anna Schubart; et al. (December 2005). "The Tim-3 ligand galectin-9 negatively regulates T helper type 1 immunity". Nature Immunology. 6 (12): 1245–52. doi:10.1038/ni1271. ISSN 1529-2908. PMID 16286920. Wikidata Q28281686.
- Kaori Sakuishi; Lionel Apetoh; Jenna M Sullivan; Bruce R Blazar; Vijay K Kuchroo; Ana C Anderson (6 September 2010). "Targeting Tim-3 and PD-1 pathways to reverse T cell exhaustion and restore anti-tumor immunity". Journal of Experimental Medicine. 207 (10): 2187–2194. doi:10.1084/jem.20100643. ISSN 0022-1007. PMC 2947065. PMID 20819927. Wikidata Q34161493.
- Ana C Anderson; Nicole Joller; Vijay K Kuchroo (1 May 2016). "Lag-3, Tim-3, and TIGIT: Co-inhibitory Receptors with Specialized Functions in Immune Regulation". Immunity. 44 (5): 989–1004. doi:10.1016/j.immuni.2016.05.001. ISSN 1074-7613. PMC 4942846. PMID 27192565. Wikidata Q38837469.
