= Howard L. Weiner =

American neurologist, neuroscientist and immunologist

Howard L Weiner
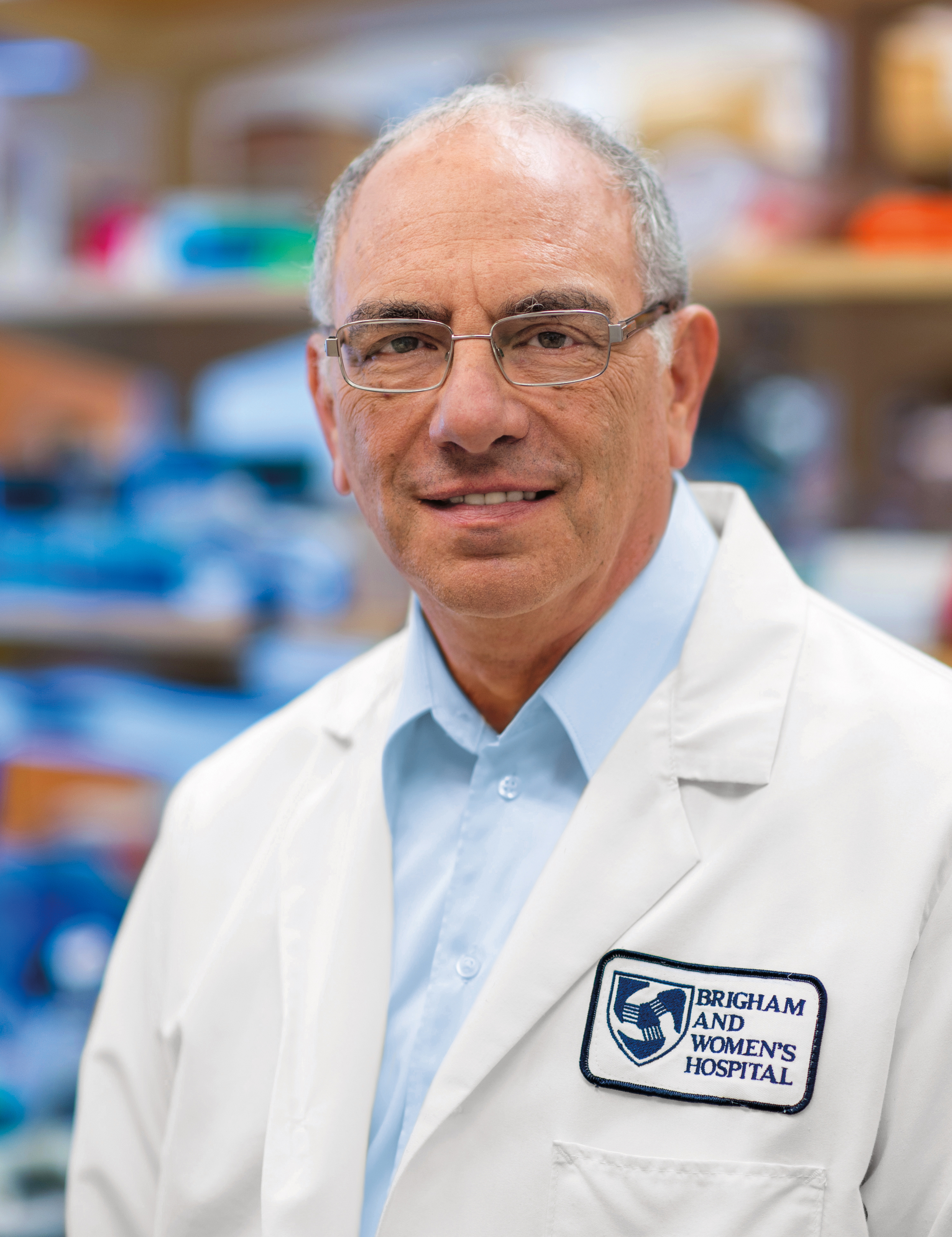
- Born: December 25, 1944 (age 81); Denver, Colorado, U.S.
- Education: University of Colorado Medical School
- Known for: multiple sclerosis research
- Children: Ron Weiner, Dan Weiner
- Awards: John Dystel Prize for Multiple Sclerosis Research (2007)
- Scientific career
- Fields: Neurology, Immunology
- Workplaces: Brigham and Women's Hospital

Howard L. Weiner (born December 25, 1944) is an American neurologist, neuroscientist and immunologist who is also a writer and filmmaker. He performs clinical and basic research focused on multiple sclerosis (MS) and other neurologic diseases such as Alzheimer's disease and Lou Gehrig's disease (ALS). His work also focuses on autoimmune diseases such as diabetes. Weiner is the Robert L. Kroc Professor of Neurology at Harvard Medical School, director of the Brigham MS Center at the Brigham and Women's Hospital and co-director of the Ann Romney Center for Neurologic Diseases established in 2014, at the Brigham and Women's Hospital in Boston, Massachusetts.

== Personal life ==
Weiner was born in 1944 in Denver, Colorado. His mother, Charlotte (née Wasserstrom) was born in Vienna, Austria in 1922 and his father, Paul, was born in Vienna, Austria in 1917, both to Ashkenazi Jewish families. His mother's family worked as furriers and his father's family owned a large clothing store in the fashionable Am Graben district in the center of Vienna.

In 1968 he married his wife, Mira (née Avinery), settled in the Boston area and raised two sons. Dan Weiner, is the co-founder and managing partner of RevelOne, a marketing talent and strategy firm for technology companies. His younger son is Ron Weiner, a television writer with credits such as Silicon Valley (TV series) and 30 Rock.

== Education ==
Weiner majored in philosophy as an undergraduate at Dartmouth College (1962–1965), leaving after three years to attend medical school.

Weiner received his medical degree from the University of Colorado Medical School in 1969, and performed his medical internship at Sheba Medical Center in Tel HaShomer, Israel, his medical residency at Beth Israel Deaconess Medical Center, Boston (1970–1971) and his neurology residency at the Harvard Longwood Program in Neurology (1971–1974).

In 1972, during his neurology residency, Weiner published Neurology for the House Officer with Lawrence P. Levitt, a fellow neurology resident. Neurology for the House Officer became a widely used manual that offered a practical approach to treating neurologic diseases. It was translated into French, Spanish, Portuguese, Russian, Chinese, Japanese. It is currently in its 8th edition, now authored by Alex Rae Grant, MD and entitled Weiner and Levitt's Neurology for the House Officer. Weiner also published Pediatric Neurology for the House Officer with Levitt and Mike Bresnan and Case Histories in Neurology for the House Officer with Levitt and Stephen Hauser. An entire House Officer Series was created based on Neurology for the House Officer. Following his residency, Weiner received a special fellowship from the Colorado MS Society to study immunology under Henry Claman at the University of Colorado School of Medicine where he studied B cell stimulation by anti-immunoglobulin. He then returned to Harvard Medical School to take a research position under Bernard N. Fields where he studied viral host interactions using the reovirus model system.

== Career at Harvard Medical School ==
In 1985, Weiner was awarded an endowed chair from the Kroc Foundation of Santa Inez California for his study of MS with a gift of $1M to the Harvard Medical School. The chair was named for Robert L. Kroc, the brother of Ray Kroc, the founder of McDonald's. Three Kroc chairs were established in the United States to support research in the autoimmune diseases of MS, diabetes, and rheumatoid arthritis as members of the Kroc family suffered from these diseases. In 1985, together with Dennis J. Selkoe, Weiner established the Center for Neurologic Diseases at Brigham and Women's Hospital that he currently co-directs with Selkoe. In 2014, it was renamed The Ann Romney Center for Neurologic Diseases. The center carries out basic and translational research in MS, Alzheimer's disease, ALS, Parkinson's disease, brain tumors and other neurologic diseases, and consists of over 300 scientists and research personnel.

In 2003, in honor of Weiner's 60th birthday and in recognition of his research in MS and other neurologic diseases, a gift of $3.3M was made to Harvard Medical School by Biogen, a Boston-based biotechnology company, to establish the Howard L. Weiner chair in neuroscience at Harvard. Because a chair cannot carry the name of an active faculty member, the chair was named for Samuel L. Wasserstrom, Weiner's maternal grandfather who was murdered in The Holocaust. Vijay K. Kuchroo was named the first incumbent of the Wasserstrom chair. The chair will carry Weiner's name upon his retirement. In 2020, the Foundation for Neurologic Diseases in Boston made a gift of $2M to the Brigham and Women's Hospital to establish the Indirawati Kuchroo and Charlotte Weiner Distinguished Chair in Neuroimmunology in honor of Kuchroo and Weiner's mothers who both suffered from Alzheimer's disease. Francisco Quintana was named the first incumbent of the Kuchroo-Weiner Chair. In 2023, Ann and Mitt Romney made a gift of $2.5M to the Brigham and Women's Hospital to establish the Howard L. Weiner Distinguished Chair in Neurology in honor of Weiner's work in MS and neurologic diseases. Oleg Butovsky was named the first incumbent of the Howard L. Weiner chair. During the course of his career, Weiner has trained over 125 clinicians and scientists.

== Medical research ==
The major focus of Weiner's career has been the study of MS, which he began in 1972 as a resident in neurology at the Peter Bent Brigham Hospital in Boston. More recently he has studied immune mechanisms in other neurologic diseases including Alzheimer's disease and ALS, Parkinson's disease, stroke and traumatic brain injury. He has published over 800 articles in the scientific literature. In 1983, he alongside Stephen L. Hauser, now Director, Weill Institute for Neurosciences and Professor of Neurology at University of California, San Francisco, published a seminal article on the treatment of MS in The New England Journal of Medicine. This demonstrated in a controlled trial a profound effect of the immunosuppressant and chemotherapy drug cyclophosphamide in stopping active, progressive MS. The article introduced the timed 25-foot walk (ambulation index) that subsequently has become a classic clinical measure in MS. In 2000, Weiner founded the Partners Multiple Sclerosis Center (now called the Brigham MS Center) at Brigham and Women's Hospital. The Brigham MS Center encompasses both adult and pediatric patients the Brigham and Women's Hospital and the Massachusetts General Hospital, respectively. Both are member hospitals of the Mass General Brigham system in Boston. The Brigham MS Center has served as a model for the comprehensive care of MS patients and includes clinical care and research, an infusion center and dedicated MRI magnet. The Brigham MS Center has 6,000 patient visits per year. Weiner established the CLIMB Study (Comprehensive Longitudinal Investigation of Multiple Sclerosis at Brigham and Women's Hospital). The CLIMB natural history study of MS, which in an analogous fashion to the Framingham Heart Study; follows over 2000 patients with annual exams, blood studies, and MRI imaging to understand the course of MS over time. Weiner has pioneered the basic investigation and application of oral tolerance and mucosal immunology for the treatment of autoimmune and inflammatory diseases. His laboratory investigates the role of the microbiome in neurological disease. In 2021, he initiated human trials of a nasal vaccine for the treatment of Alzheimer's disease in which blood monocytes are triggered to clear amyloid from the brain; protollin is now through Phase 1 trials. In 2022, he began a program of human trials of nasal immune therapy for MS, Alzheimer's disease and ALS which an anti-CD3 monoclonal antibody is given nasally to induce regulatory T cells.

== Biotechnology ==
In 1994, Weiner founded Autoimmune, Inc a biotechnology company which developed the application of oral tolerance for the treatment of autoimmune diseases including MS, rheumatoid arthritis and type 1 diabetes. Susan Quinn, a writer known for her biography of Marie Curie, chronicled Weiner's journey with Autoimmune, Inc in a book entitled, Human Trials: Scientists, Investors, and Patients in the Quest for a Cure. The clinical development of nasal tolerance for MS, Alzheimer's disease, and ALS using anti-CD3 monoclonal antibody (foralumab) is currently being developed by Tiziana Life Sciences where Weiner heads the scientific advisory board, including studies in COVID-19. Based on Weiner's research, Tilos Therapeutics was formed in 2016 and is developing the treatment of cancer using a monoclonal antibody directed against LAP which a new checkpoint inhibitor that targets TGF-beta and regulatory T cells. Tilos Therapeutics was acquired by Merck & Co in 2019.

== Awards ==
In 1988, Weiner received the Senator Jacob Javits Neuroscience Award from the National Institutes of Health. In 2003, Weiner was awarded the John Dystel Prize in multiple sclerosis research for his work on the immunology and immunotherapy of multiple sclerosis, by the American Academy of Neurology and the National MS Society. In 2008 Weiner received the Betty and David Koetser Foundation Prize for Brain Research. In 2012, Weiner received a National Institutes of Health Transformative Research Award from the institutes' Directors office for the investigation of the innate immune system in Alzheimer's Disease. Of 750 applications for the award, only 20 were given, and Weiner's video won first place. In 2024, Weiner was given the “Giants of Multiple Sclerosis Award” by the Consortium of MS Centers for his lifetime work in the field of MS research. In 2025, The Weiner Prize in Neuroimmunology was established to recognize outstanding achievement in the field of neuroimmunology. The inaugural recipient was Lawrence Steinman of Stanford, who gave the inaugural lecture at Harvard. The Weiner Prize will be given on an annual basis and includes a 10K prize. In 2025, Weiner received the Silver and Gold Alumni Award from the University of Colorado in recognition of his contributions to the science of art in medicine. Other awards include American Brain Foundation Award (2019), the Soriano lectureship for Contributions to Neuroscience (2013), the UCSF Neurology Fishman Professorship (2013), Award for Outstanding Research Nature Biotechnology (2009), the MS Dinner of Champions Hope Award (2005), Millennium Innovator in Medicine Award (2003), Stanley Waterman MS Research lectureship (1999), and the University of Toronto Neurology Mary and Sandy McEwan lectureship (1996).

== Film career ==
Weiner wrote, produced and directed a documentary film entitled, What is Life: The Movie which was released in 2011. The film won four 2011 Los Angeles Movie Awards in the category of Documentary Feature: Award of Excellence, Best Cinematography, Best Editing, and Best Visual Effects. His second film, The Last Poker Game, is a narrative feature film which Weiner wrote, produced and directed, starring Martin Landau and Paul Sorvino. It had its world premiere at the Tribeca Film Festival on April 24, 2017. It won Best Feature Drama and Martin Landau won Best Actor at the 20th Annual California Independent Film Festival in 2017. The film had a limited theatrical release on January 12, 2018, as Abe and Phil's Last Poker Game and is now available on iTunes and Amazon. The film has also received critical acclaim in Variety and the Village Voice. Weiner gave a lecture on his film making entitled “A Doctor’s Journey to Hollywood”. At Tribeca, Martin Landau spoke about “The Last Poker Game” and becoming an actor. At the Hollywood premiere, a panel led by Pete Hammond of Deadline Hollywood discussed the film.

== Music ==
Weiner wrote the words and music to a country and western song “Spit on Flowers” and a love song “Island of Time” that he released as music videos in which he performs the songs with the Ward Hayden and Outliers Band. Weiner wrote the words and music to “Lonely Summer Nights” the theme song for this film. "What Is Life? The Movie", which he performs with his son, Ron.

== Books ==
Weiner published the novel The Children's Ward (Putnam New York) in 1980. In 2007, Weiner published Curing MS: How Science is Solving the Mysteries of Multiple Sclerosis (Crown: New York). The book chronicles both the history of MS and Weiner's personal journal in investigating and treating MS. Weiner's latest book, The Brain Under Siege was published in 2021. In his book, Weiner likens the brain to a crime scene, showing readers how “clues” point to causes and suggest paths to a cure. In 2022, the book was a finalist for The Next Generation Indie Book Awards.
