= David A. Hafler =

American neurologist

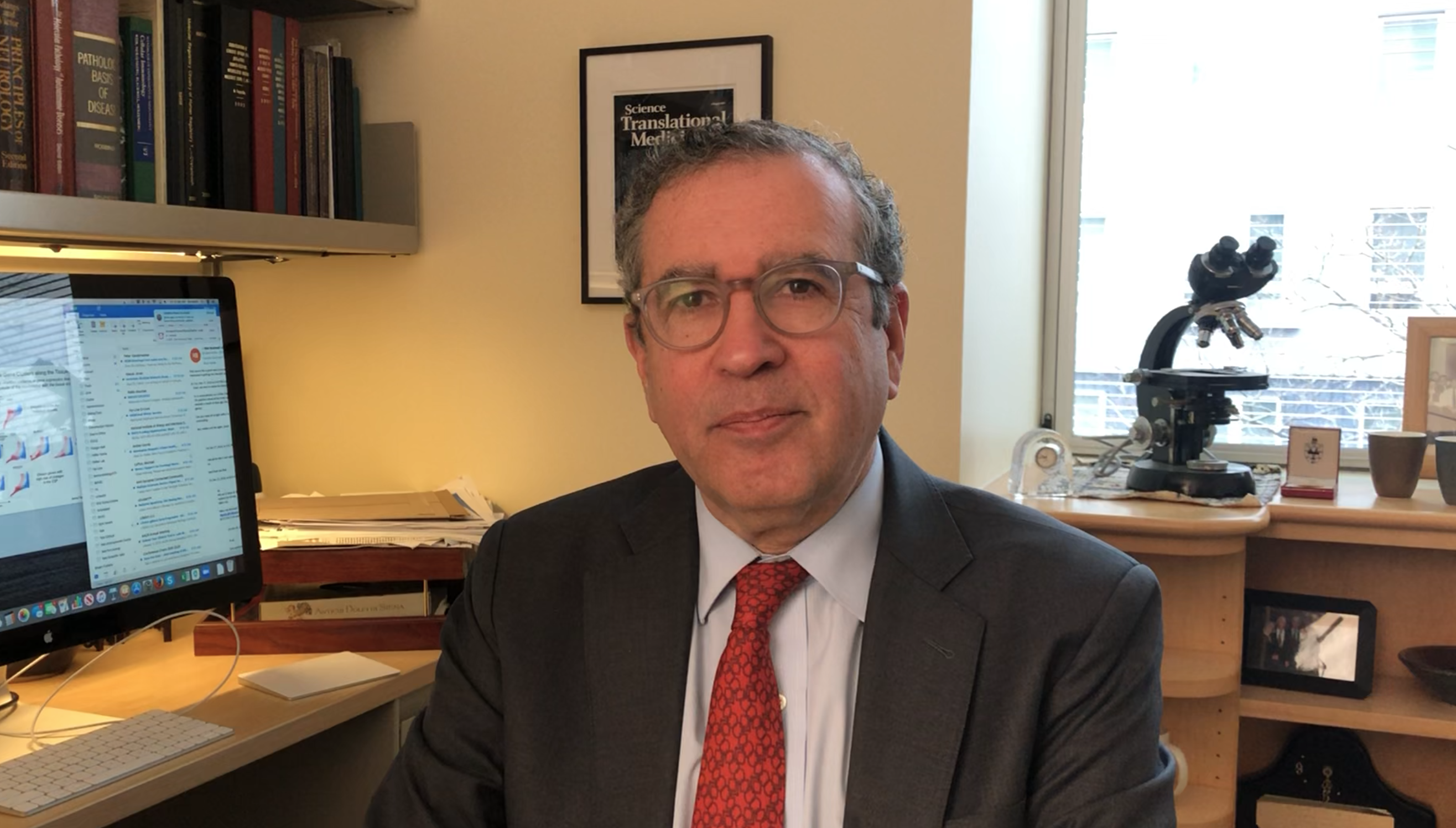
- Hafler in November 2020
- Born: 1952 (age 73–74); New York City, U.S.
- Occupation: Neurologist
- Known for: His work in the fields of immunity, genetics and multiple sclerosis

David A. Hafler (born 1952) is an American neurologist. He is the Edgerly Professor and former chairman of the department of Neurology at the Yale School of Medicine, where he works on immunity, genetics, and multiple sclerosis. In 2018, he was elected to the National Academy of Medicine.

== Early life and education ==
Hafler was born in 1952 in New York. He became interested in immunology at a young age and began doing research in the field as a high school student. In 1974 he graduated from Emory University in Atlanta, Georgia with a combined Bachelor of Science in chemistry and Master of Science in biochemistry. His master's thesis was on fragments of myelin basic protein.

In 1978, he received his MD degree from the University of Miami School of Medicine in Miami, Florida. He was a medical intern from 1978–1979 at the Johns Hopkins Hospital in Baltimore, Maryland. From 1979 to 1982, he was a resident in neurology at the New York Hospital-Cornell Medical Center and Memorial Sloan Kettering Cancer Institute in New York City. In 1982, he was a guest investigator in the laboratory of the immunologist Henry G. Kunkel at Rockefeller University.

== Career ==
From 1982 to 1984, he was a fellow in neurology and immunology at Harvard Medical School in Boston, Massachusetts. He was one of the first post-doctoral fellows of Howard L. Weiner, and began to work in his lab on multiple sclerosis. In 1984, he joined the faculty of Harvard Medical School in the department of Neurology. He stayed on in Weiner's laboratory, becoming a principal investigator.

In 1998, Hafler and Weiner co-founded a private biotech company called Autoimmune Inc., a biopharmaceutical company developing orally administered pharmaceutical products for the treatment of autoimmune and other cell-mediated inflammatory diseases and conditions. The Company's products, which induce tissue-specific immunosuppression without toxicity, are based upon the principles of oral tolerance. The company went public in 1993 with Henri Termeer and others on the Board of Directors.

In 2000, he was appointed to an endowed professorship and became the Breakstone Professor of Neurology at Harvard.

In 2009, Hafler and his laboratory moved to Yale Medical School in New Haven, Connecticut, where he became the Glaser Professor and chairman of the department of Neurology. He was awarded the John Dystel Prize for Multiple Sclerosis Research in 2010 by the American Academy of Neurology and National Multiple Sclerosis Society. It was awarded "for fundamental discoveries related to MS in fields such as immunology and genetics, and for bringing clinical importance to basic science findings."

In 2015, Hafler was appointed to the newly created Edgerly Professorship in Neurology at Yale. This endowed professorship was provided by William S. and Lois Stiles Edgerly who had long supported research in multiple sclerosis. In 2018 he was elected to membership in the National Academy of Medicine with the citation "For seminal discoveries defining the pathogenesis of multiple sclerosis (MS), including identification of autoreactive T cells and mechanisms that underlie their dysregulation, and the discovery of susceptibility genes that lead to MS."

== Awards and honors ==
- 1978 Elected into AOA Society
- 1993 Elected to The American Society for Clinical Investigation
- 2004 Javits Neuroscience Investigator Award, National Institutes of Health
- 2010 John Dystel Prize for Multiple Sclerosis Research, American Academy of Neurology
- 2015 Raymond D. Adams Lectureship, American Neurological Association
- 2018 Elected to the National Academy of Medicine

== Selected publications ==
- Hafler, David A.; David A. Fox; Mary Elizabeth Manning; Stuart F. Schlossman; Ellis L. Reinherz; Howard L. Weiner (1985). "In Vivo Activated T Lymphocytes in the Peripheral Blood and Cerebrospinal Fluid of Patients with Multiple Sclerosis". The New England Journal of Medicine. 312 (22): 1405–1411. doi:10.1056/NEJM198505303122201. PMID 2985995.
- Ota K, Matsui M, Milford E, Weiner H, Hafler DA. T cell recognition of an immunodominant MBP epitope in MS. Nature 346, 183. 2001
- Baecher-Allan C, Brown JA, Freeman GJ, Hafler, DA. CD4+CD25high regulatory cells in human peripheral blood. J Immunol 167(3): 1245-53 2004
- Viglietta V, Baecher-Allan C, Hafler DA, Loss of suppression by CD+CD25+ regulatory T cells in MS patients. J Exp Med 199:971.
- Viglietta, V; Baecher-Allan C; Weiner HL; Hafler DA (2004). "Loss of functional suppression by CD+CD25+ regulatory T cells in patients with multiple sclerosis". The Journal of Experimental Medicine. 199 (7): 971–979. doi:10.1084/jem.20031579. PMC 2211881. PMID 15067033.
- International Multiple Sclerosis Genetic Consortium; Hafler, D.A., Compston, A., Sawcer, S., Lander, S., Daly, M.J., DeJager, P.L., de Bakker, P.I.W., Gabriel, S.B., Mirel, D.B., Ivinson, A.J., Pericak-Vance, M.A., Gregory, S.G., Rioux, J.D., McCauley, J.L., Haines, J.L., Barcellos, L.F., Cree, B., Oksenberg, J.R., Hauser, S.L. (2007). "Risk alleles for multiple sclerosis identified by a genomewide study". New England Journal of Medicine. 357 (9): 851–62. doi:10.1056/NEJMoa073493. PMID 17660530.
- Kleinewietfeld M, Manzel A, Titze J, Kvakan H, Yosef N, Linker RA, Muller DN, Hafler DA. Sodium chloride drives autoimmune disease by the induction of pathogenic Th17 cells. Nature; 496(7446):518-22
- Farh K, Marson A, Zhu J, Kleinwietfeld M, Housley WJ, Beik S, Shoresh N, Whitton H, Ryan RJH, Shishkin AA, Hatan M, Carrasco-Alfonso MJ, Mayer D, Luckey CJ, Patsopoulos NA, De Jager PL, Kuchroo VK, Epstein CB, Daly MJ, Hafler DA* Bernstein BE, *. Genetic and epigenetic fine mapping of causal variants in autoimmune disease. Nature; 518(7539):337-43
- International Multiple Sclerosis Genetics Consortium. Low frequency and rare coding variation contributes to multiple sclerosis risk. Cell, 2018
