= Daniel Fidelin =

French politician

Mayor of Montivilliers
- Incumbent
- Assumed office 30 March 2014
- Preceded by: Daniel Petit

Member of the National Assembly for Seine-Maritime's 9th constituency
- In office 19 June 2002 – 19 June 2012
- Preceded by: Patrick Jeanne
- Succeeded by: Estelle Grelier

Personal details
- Born: 25 May 1948 (age 78) Fécamp, France
- Party: UMP; The Republicans

Daniel Fidelin (born 25 May 1948) was a member of the National Assembly of France. He represents the Seine-Maritime department, and is a member of the Union for a Popular Movement.
