= Abe & Phil's Last Poker Game =

- Theatrical poster
- Directed by: Howard L. Weiner
- Screenplay by: Howard L. Weiner
- Produced by: Howard L. Weiner
- Starring: Martin Landau; Paul Sorvino; Maria Dizzia
- Cinematography: Terrence Hayes
- Edited by: Andy Keir; Victoria Lesiw
- Music by: Steven Argila
- Production company: Long Road Film
- Distributed by: Gravitas Ventures
- Release date: April 24, 2017 (Tribeca Film Festival)
- Running time: 85 minutes
- Country: United States
- Language: English

Abe & Phil's Last Poker Game is a 2017 American comedy-drama film directed and written by Howard L. Weiner and starring Martin Landau, Paul Sorvino and Maria Dizzia. It is about a character named Dr. Abe Mandelbaum, played by Landau, who is placed in a retirement home while incapable of managing his wife's decaying health.

It was the first feature film by Weiner, a neurologist. It debuted at the 2017 Tribeca Film Festival, before Landau's death in July 2017. It received mixed reviews, with some positive assessments of Landau's performance.

== Cast ==
- Martin Landau as Dr. Abe Mandelbaum
- Paul Sorvino as Phil Nicoletti
- Maria Dizzia as Angela Donadio
- Ann Marie Shea as Molly Mandelbaum
- Pamela Dubin as Sheryl
- Alexander Cook as Richard Grollman
- Lyralen Kaye as Sister Elizabeth

== Production ==
Abe & Phil's Last Poker Game was the first feature film written and directed by Professor Howard L. Weiner, a neurologist. Weiner stated that in medical school, he made his own music videos about The Beatles, and viewed cinema as another medium to pursue truth. He forwarded the screenplay to an Emerson College cinema instructor, who saw promise in it and gave him advice.

Weiner's son, television writer Ron Weiner, contacted producers and had some scenes shot in Los Angeles. It was filmed over five weeks. Howard Weiner also produced it for Premiere Entertainment.

Landau chose to take the role, saying "It was unusual, and it kept unfolding in unpredictable ways".

== Release ==
The film screened at the Tribeca Film Festival under the title The Last Poker Game, the only directorial and writing debut of a septuagenarian at Tribeca that year. Martin Landau attended the spring festival, for his last film released before he died in July 2017. A trailer was published in November 2017 ahead of the January 12, 2018 theatrical and video-on-demand release.

== Reception ==
As of February 18, 2018 the film has a 67% approval rating on Rotten Tomatoes, based on 9 reviews. Metacritic also gave it a score of 48, indicating "mixed or average" reviews.

Pete Hammond, writing for Deadline Hollywood, assessed it as "not only a touching, funny, quite raunchy (especially in its depiction of senior sex) dramedy, it is exceptionally well made". Variety critic Joe Leydon assessed it as "low-key and deeply felt", and hailed Landau for his best performance since 1994's Ed Wood, commenting Landau's death could also influence viewers' perspectives on him playing a character close to death. Ben Kenigsberg in The New York Times criticized it for "flat direction", adding Weiner at least incorporated his medical expertise, "however awkwardly presented". The Hollywood Reporter's John DeFore called it "tepid" but said Landau "delivers with dignity in an uplift-oriented project". In the Los Angeles Times, Michael Rechtshaffen judged Landau "effective" but said the film was on "a wobbly line between melancholic and mawkish".
