= Transmembrane immunoglobulin and munin domain =

Transmembrane immunoglobulin and munin domain (TIM) proteins are a family of cell surface immunomodulatory proteins.

== See also ==
- TIM1
