= Abba Eban =

Israeli diplomat and politician (1915–2002)

- אבא אבן
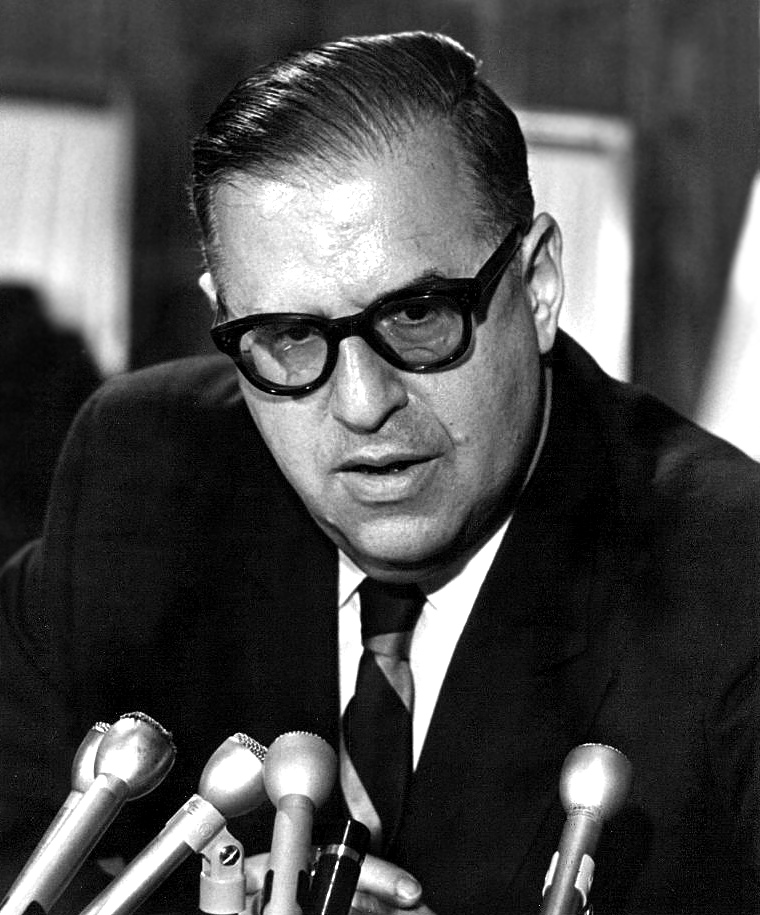
- Abba Eban in 1970

Ministerial roles
- 1959–1960: Minister without Portfolio
- 1960–1963: Minister of Education & Culture
- 1963–1966: Deputy Prime Minister
- 1966–1974: Minister of Foreign Affairs

Faction represented in the Knesset
- 1959–1965: Mapai
- 1965–1968: Alignment
- 1968–1969: Labor Party
- 1969–1988: Alignment

Diplomatic roles
- 1949–1959: Permanent Representative to the UN
- 1950–1959: Ambassador to the United States

Personal details
- Born: 2 February 1915 Cape Town, South Africa
- Died: 17 November 2002 (aged 87) Tel Aviv, Israel
- Spouse: Shoshana Ambache
- Children: Eli Eban
- Education: Queens' College, Cambridge (BA)
- Awards: Israel Prize (2001)
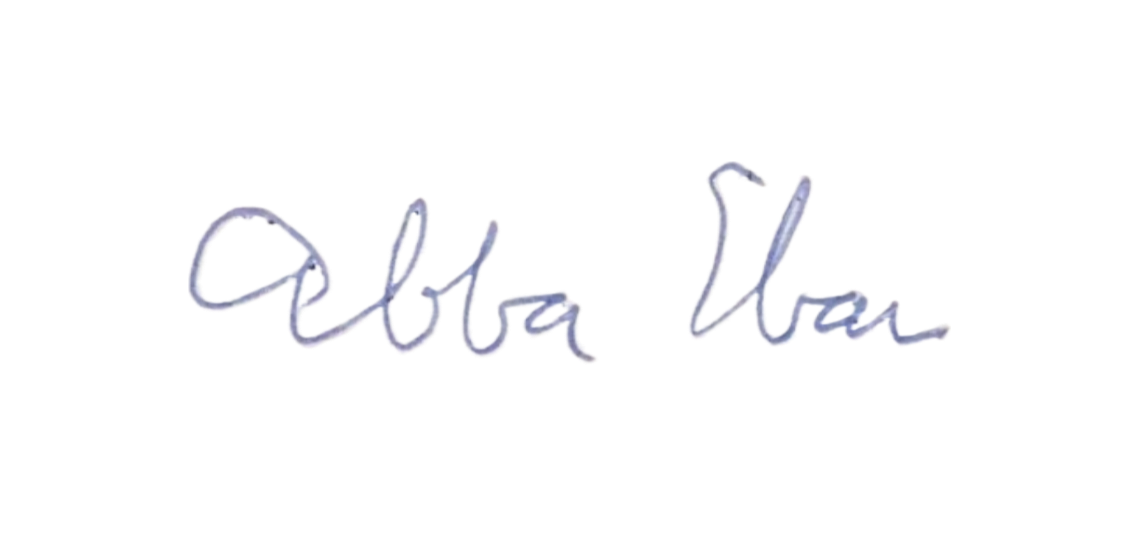
- Signature

Abba Solomon Meir Eban (/ˈɑːbə ˈiːbən/; Hebrew: אבא שלמה אבן [ˈ(ʔ)aba ˈ(ʔ)even]; born Aubrey Solomon Meir Eban; 2 February 1915 – 17 November 2002) was a South African-born Israeli diplomat and politician, and a scholar of the Arabic and Hebrew languages.

During his career, he served as Foreign Affairs Minister, Education Minister, and Deputy Prime Minister of Israel. He was the second ambassador to the United States and the first Permanent Representative of Israel to the United Nations. He was also vice president of the United Nations General Assembly and president of the Weizmann Institute of Science. Eban famously remarked of the Palestinians, "The Arabs never miss an opportunity to miss an opportunity."

== Early life, family and education ==
Eban was born in Cape Town, South Africa, on 2 February 1915 to Lithuanian Jewish parents. His mother, Alida Sacks, was the aunt of Oliver Sacks, making the two of them first cousins. His father, Avram Solomon, died in London less than a week before Eban's first birthday. The family had travelled there seeking treatment for his undiagnosed illness. He recalled being sent to his grandfather's house as a child to study the Hebrew language, Talmud, and Biblical literature. He lived for a period of time in Belfast, Northern Ireland.

He attended St Olave's Grammar School, then in Southwark, and read Classics and Oriental languages at Queens' College, Cambridge, where he achieved a very rare triple first, studying Hebrew, Arabic, and Persian; these were three of the ten languages he would reportedly master (Note: Greek, Latin, English, Modern Hebrew, Biblical Hebrew, Arabic, Persian, French, German and Spanish) (he enjoyed translating newspaper articles into Ancient Greek). At the age of 23, he became a Fellow of Pembroke College, a role he held from 1938 to 1939, and was marked for a distinguished academic career.

During his time at university and afterwards, Eban was highly involved in the Federation of Zionist Youth and was editor of its journal, The Young Zionist. At the outbreak of World War II, he worked for Chaim Weizmann at the Zionist Organization in London from December 1939.

== Career ==
=== Early career ===
Eban served in the British Army in Egypt and Mandate Palestine, becoming an intelligence officer in Jerusalem, where he coordinated and trained volunteers for resistance in the event of a German invasion, serving as a liaison officer for the Allies to the Jewish Yishuv.

After the war he continued in his post, helping to establish and run the British Foreign Office's Middle East Centre for Arab Studies which was originally based in Jerusalem before relocating to Shemlan near Beirut. He was at that time known as "Aubrey Evans".

In 1947, he translated from the original Arabic Maze of Justice: Diary of a Country Prosecutor, a 1937 novel by Tawfiq al-Hakim.

=== Diplomacy ===
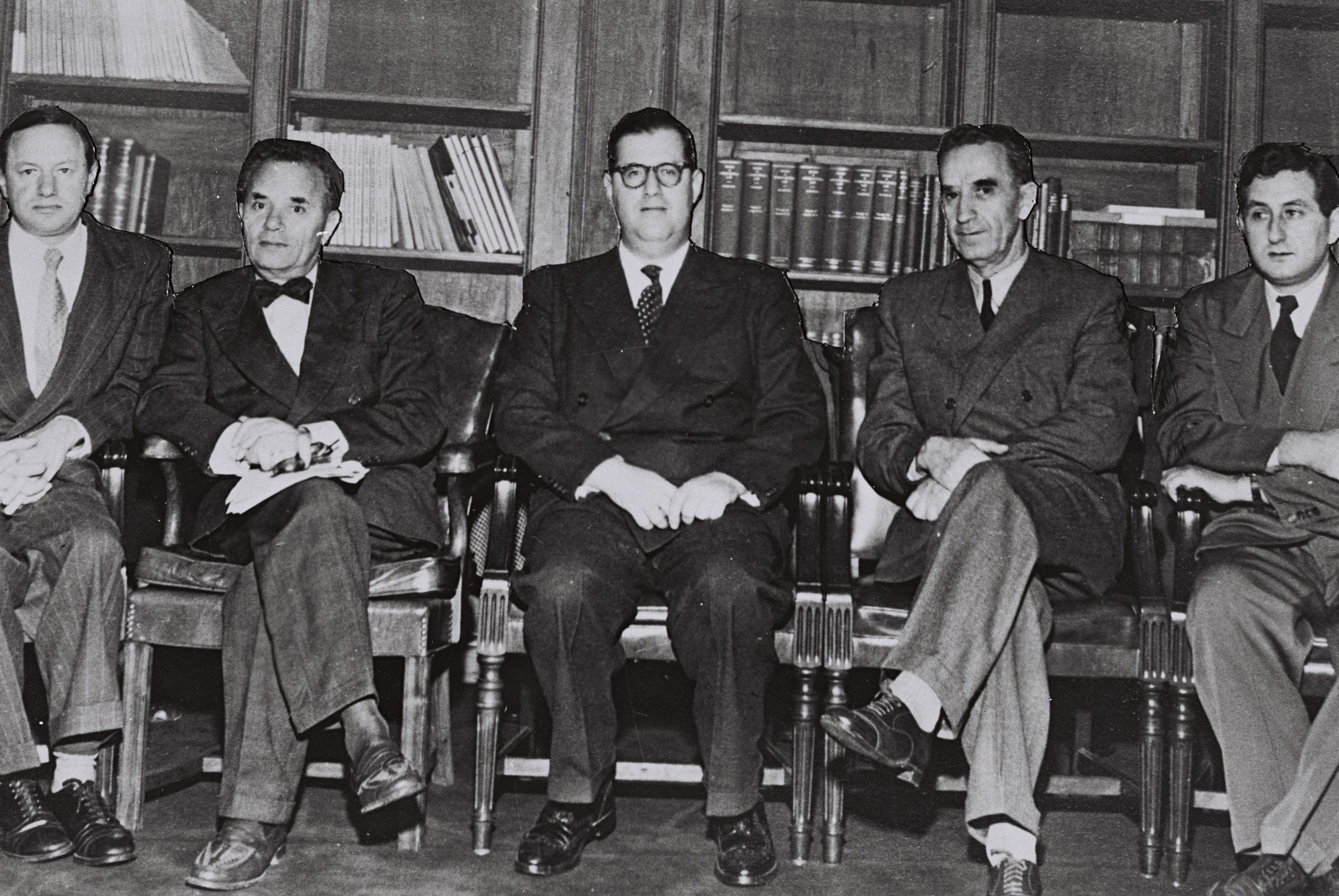
Israeli UN delegation: (L–R) consul general A. Lourie; counsellor J. Robinson; Eban; Avraham Katznelson; Gideon Rafael (1950)

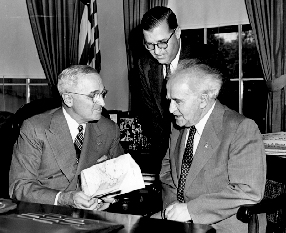
(L–R) U.S. President Truman, Eban, and Israeli PM Ben-Gurion (1951)

Eban moved back to London briefly to work in the Jewish Agency's Information Department, from which he was posted to New York, where the United Nations General Assembly was considering the "Palestine Question". In 1947, he was appointed as a liaison officer to the United Nations Special Committee on Palestine, where he was successful in attaining approval for the recommendation of partition of Palestine into Jewish and Arab segments—Resolution 181. At this stage, he changed his name to the Hebrew word Abba, meaning "Father".

In July 1948, during the Arab-Israeli War, the Arab Higher Committee presented a formal complaint to the United Nations of the various war crimes committed by "Palestinian Jews", which included engaging in "bacteriological warfare". Eban vehemently denied the accusations that the Haganah had poisoned water wells, attempted to block further investigations and accused the Arab states of engaging in "antisemitic incitement". The accusations were proven true only in 2022, when Operation Cast Thy Bread was revealed.

Eban continued at the United Nations over the next decade. From 1950 to 1959 he also served as his country's ambassador to the United States.

He was renowned for his oratorical skills. As Henry Kissinger stated:

I have never encountered anyone who matched his command of the English language. Sentences poured forth in mellifluous constructions complicated enough to test the listener’s intelligence and simultaneously leave him transfixed by the speaker's virtuosity.

His knowledge of history and fluency in ten languages enhanced his speech-making in the United Nations, even to skeptical or hostile audiences. In 1952, Eban was elected vice president of the UN General Assembly. A collection of Eban's speeches before the United Nations' Security Council and General Assembly as well as at universities and other venues between 1948 and 1968 was compiled in Voice of Israel. He was also known for his witty remarks. For example, when he was complimented on his perfect Oxford English, he corrected that he actually attended Cambridge, "but in public life you must expect to be smeared!"

=== Politics ===
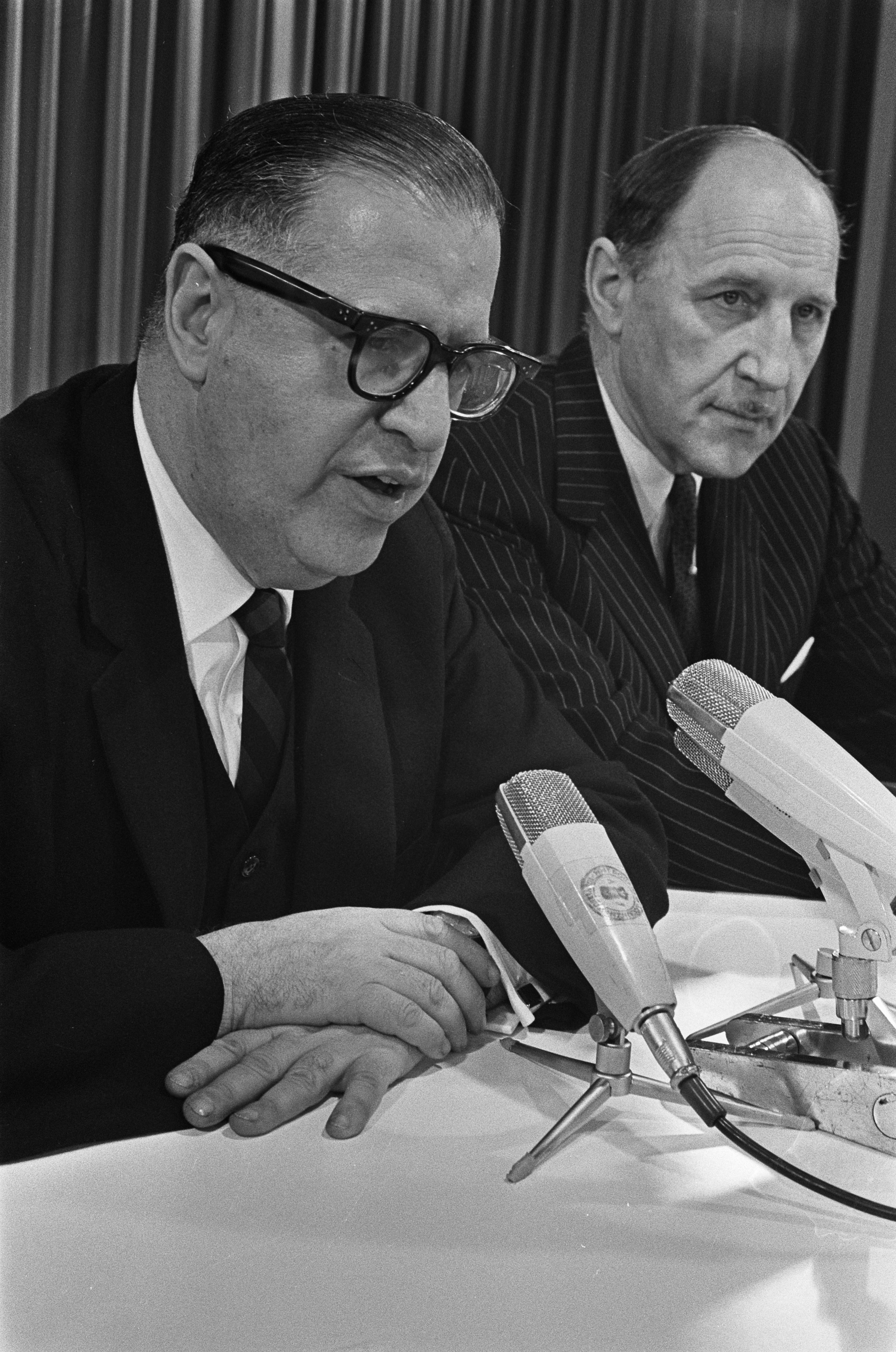
Abba Eban at a press conference (1968)

Eban left the United States in 1959 and returned to Israel, where he was elected to the Knesset (the Israeli parliament) as a member of Mapai. He served under David Ben-Gurion as Minister of Education and Culture from 1960 to 1963, then as deputy to Prime Minister Levi Eshkol until 1966. Through this period (1959–66), he also served as president of the Weizmann Institute of Science in Rehovot.

From 1966 to 1974, Eban served as Israel's foreign minister. He defended the country's reputation after the Six-Day War by asserting, in a speech to the United Nations General Assembly, that Israel acted in response to an imminent threat: "So on the fateful morning of 5 June, when Egyptian forces moved by air and land against Israel's western coast and southern territory, our country's choice was plain." Nonetheless, he was a strong supporter of trading parts of the territories occupied in the war in exchange for peace. While serving as foreign minister, he remained in contact with Israel's Ambassador to the US Avraham Harman during the war. Five days after the USS Liberty incident took place, Harman cabled from Washington D.C. to Eban in Tel Aviv that one of their sources was reporting that the Americans had "clear proof that from a certain stage the pilot discovered the identity of the ship and continued the attack anyway." Three days later, Harman repeated the warning to Eban that the White House was "very angry" and "the reason for this is that the Americans probably have findings showing that our pilots indeed knew that the ship was American." Eban also played an important part in the shaping of UN Security Council Resolution 242 in 1967, as well as Resolution 338 in 1973. Among his other high level contacts, he was received by Pope Paul VI in 1969.

Eban was at times criticized for not voicing his opinions in Israel's internal debate. However, he was generally known to be on the "dovish" side of Israeli politics and was increasingly outspoken after leaving the cabinet. In 1977 and 1981, it was widely understood that Shimon Peres intended to name him Foreign Minister, had the Labor Party won those elections. Eban was offered the chance to serve as minister without portfolio in the 1984 national unity government, but instead he chose to serve as chair of the Knesset's Foreign Affairs and Defense Committee from 1984 to 1988.

His comment that Arabs "never miss an opportunity to miss an opportunity" (meaning, for peace), made after the Geneva peace talks in December 1973, is often quoted.

=== Later career ===
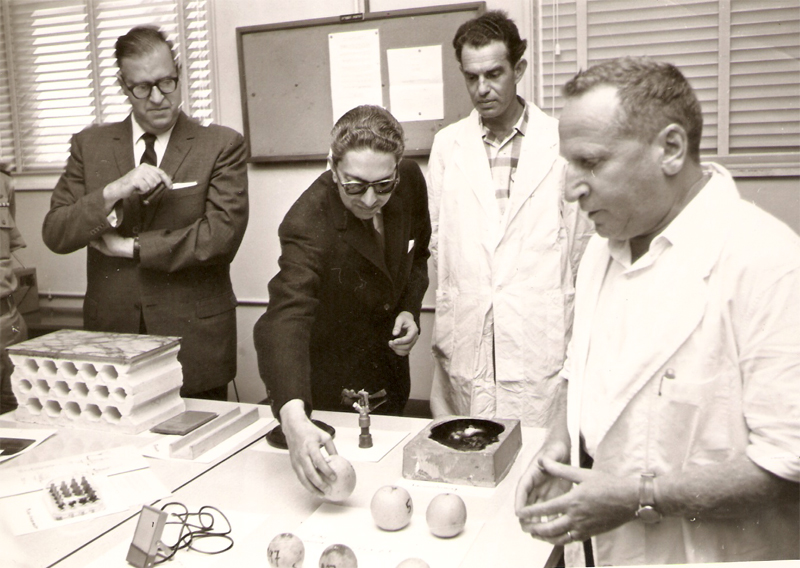
Abba Eban (left) escorting the King of Nepal in a 1958 visit to the Weizmann Institute in Rehovot. Shortly after the visit, Eban became President of the institute.

In 1988, after three decades in the Knesset, Eban lost his seat over internal splits in the Labour Party. He devoted the rest of his life to writing and teaching, including serving as a visiting academic at Princeton University, Columbia University and George Washington University. He also narrated television documentaries including Heritage: Civilization and the Jews (PBS, 1984), for which he was host, Israel, A Nation Is Born (1992), and On the Brink of Peace (PBS, 1997). In his book Diplomacy for the Next Century (p. 161) he said of Benjamin Netanyahu "Only Binyamin Netanyahu, the newly elected Israeli leader, failed to comprehend the centrality of the Palestine issue in the Middle East".

== Awards ==
In 2001, Eban was awarded the Israel Prize for lifetime achievement and special contribution to society and the State.

== Personal life and death ==
Eban was married to Shoshana "Suzy" (née Ambache) (sister of Aura Herzog), and they had two children. Eban died in 2002 and was buried in Kfar Shmaryahu, north of Tel Aviv. Suzy died in 2011.

Eban's son, Eli Eban, is a clarinetist who teaches at Indiana University. Eli has two children, Yael and Omri Eban.

== Published works ==
- Voice of Israel. 1957. OCLC 332941.
  - Reissued as an eBook by Plunkett Lake Press. 2015. ASIN B00WMSREMK
- The tide of nationalism. 1959. OCLC 371099. (Herbert Samuel lecture)
- Eban, Abba Solomon (1968). My people: the story of the Jews. ISBN 978-0-394-72759-2.
- My country: the story of modern Israel. New York, Random House. 1972. ISBN 978-0-394-46314-8.
- Eban, Abba Solomon (1977). Abba Eban: an autobiography. ISBN 978-0-394-49302-2.
  - Reissued as an eBook by Plunkett Lake Press. 2015. ASIN B00TBTU9ZC.
- Eban, Abba Solomon (1983). The new diplomacy: international affairs in the modern age. ISBN 978-0-394-50283-0.
- Eban, Abba Solomon (1984). Heritage: civilization and the Jews. ISBN 978-0-671-44103-6.
- Personal witness: Israel through my eyes. G. P. Putnam's Sons. 1992. ISBN 978-0-399-13589-7.
- Eban, Abba Solomon; Even, Abbâ Šelomo (1998). Diplomacy for the next century. ISBN 978-0-300-07287-7.

== General sources and further reading ==
- Brecher, Michael (2019). "Eban and Israeli Foreign Policy: Diplomacy, War, and Disengagement". The Diplomats, 1939-1979. Princeton University Press. pp. 398–435. doi:10.2307/j.ctv8pz9nc.20.
- Butler, Gavri (25 November 2002). "In Memoriam – Abba Eban". The Commentator. 6 (5). Archived from the original on 5 March 2016.
- Charney, Marc D. (18 November 2002). "Abba Eban, Eloquent Defender And Voice of Israel, Is Dead at 87". The New York Times. Archived from the original on 7 February 2012.
- Siniver, Asaf (2015). "Abba Eban and the Development of American–Israeli Relations, 1950–1959". Diplomacy & Statecraft. 26 (1): 65–83 – via ResearchGate.
