= Marie-Agnès Poussier-Winsback =

French politician (born 1967)

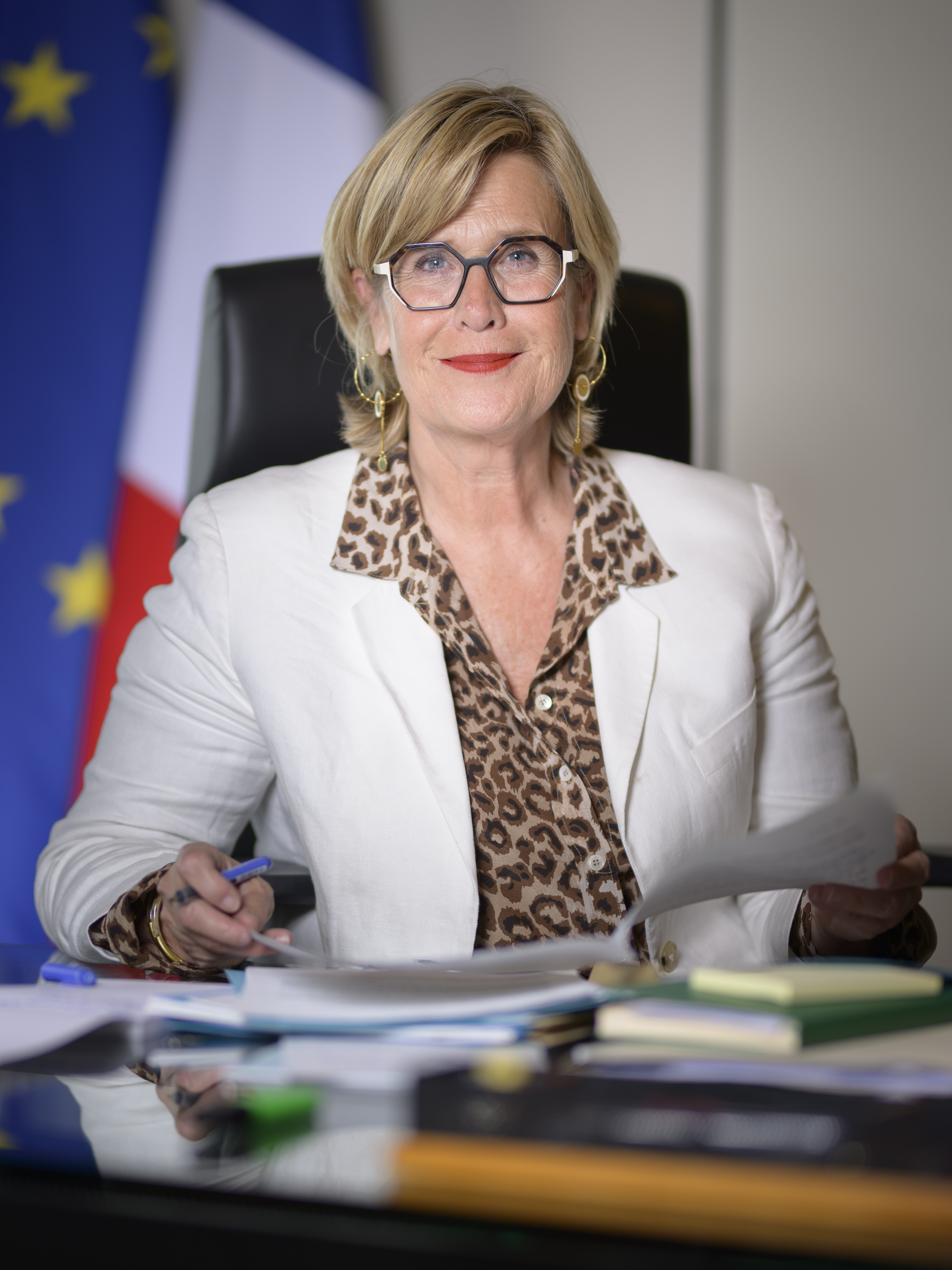

Member of the National Assembly for Seine-Maritime's 9th constituency
- In office 22 June 2022 – 21 October 2024
- Preceded by: Stéphanie Kerbarh
- Succeeded by: David Guérin
- Incumbent
- Assumed office 24 January 2025

Personal details
- Born: 25 March 1967 (age 59) Nancy, France
- Party: Horizons (since 2021)
- Other political affiliations: Republican (2015-2021); UMP (2002-2015); RPR (1989-2002)
- Education: Paris-Panthéon-Assas University

Marie-Agnès Poussier-Winsback (born 25 March 1967) is a French politician of Horizons who has been serving as member of parliament for Seine-Maritime's 9th constituency since the 2022 French legislative election. She was re-elected in the June 2024 French legislative election. In September 2024, she was appointed Minister Delegate for the Social and Solidarity Economy in the Barnier government. She returned to parliament in January 2025 when she was replaced in government by Véronique Louwagie.

== See also ==
- List of deputies of the 16th National Assembly of France
- List of deputies of the 17th National Assembly of France
