= HAVCR2 =

Protein-coding gene in the species Homo sapiens

Identifiers
- Aliases: HAVCR2, HAVcr-2, KIM-3, TIM3, TIMD-3, TIMD3, Tim-3, CD366, hepatitis A virus cellular receptor 2, SPTCL
- External IDs: OMIM: 606652; MGI: 2159682; GeneCards: HAVCR2
Available structures
PDB	Ortholog search: PDBe RCSB
PDB	List of PDB id codes 5F71

Gene location (Human)
Chr.	Chromosome 5 (human)
Band	5q33.3	Start	157,085,422 bp
Band	5q33.3	End	157,142,869 bp

Gene location (Mouse)
Chr.	Chromosome 11 (mouse)
Band	11|11 B1.1	Start	46,345,762 bp
Band	11|11 B1.1	End	46,372,082 bp
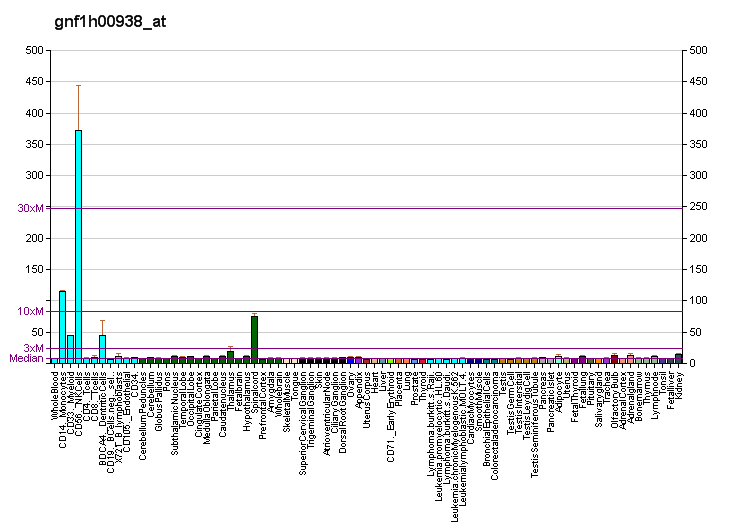

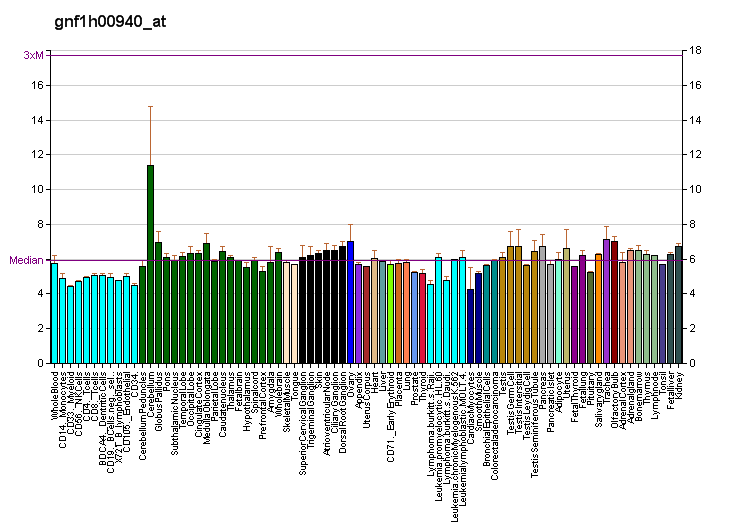
RNA expression pattern
Bgee	Human / Mouse (ortholog); Top expressed in: granulocyte; monocyte; appendix; blood; spleen; C1 segment; lymph node; amniotic fluid; upper lobe of left lung; decidua / Top expressed in: gastrula; decidua; stroma of bone marrow; spleen; lumbar subsegment of spinal cord; embryo; endothelial cell of lymphatic vessel; superior frontal gyrus; primary visual cortex; dentate gyrus of hippocampal formation granule cell; More reference expression data
BioGPS	More reference expression data
Gene ontology
Molecular function	metal ion binding; protein binding
Cellular component	integral component of membrane; membrane; cell junction; early endosome; immunological synapse; cell surface; mediator complex
Biological process	negative regulation of natural killer cell mediated cytotoxicity directed against tumor cell target; negative regulation of defense response to bacterium; negative regulation of interferon-gamma production; negative regulation of immunological synapse formation; adaptive immune response; maternal process involved in female pregnancy; positive regulation of cytokine production; negative regulation of natural killer cell activation; immune system process; negative regulation of immune response to tumor cell; negative regulation of interleukin-6 production; negative regulation of granulocyte colony-stimulating factor production; natural killer cell tolerance induction; positive regulation of interferon-gamma production; positive regulation of macrophage activation; regulation of tolerance induction dependent upon immune response; negative regulation of T-helper 1 type immune response; positive regulation of defense response to bacterium; positive regulation of interleukin-4 production; negative regulation of gene expression; positive regulation of NIK/NF-kappaB signaling; negative regulation of myeloid dendritic cell activation; macrophage activation involved in immune response; negative regulation of T cell proliferation; positive regulation of T cell proliferation; positive regulation of ERK1 and ERK2 cascade; positive regulation of innate immune response; negative regulation of interferon-alpha production; negative regulation of innate immune response; positive regulation of chemokine production; negative regulation of T cell activation via T cell receptor contact with antigen bound to MHC molecule on antigen presenting cell; negative regulation of tumor necrosis factor production; toll-like receptor 9 signaling pathway; negative regulation of type I interferon production; innate immune response; inflammatory response; negative regulation of interleukin-3 production; negative regulation of NF-kappaB transcription factor activity; toll-like receptor 3 signaling pathway; negative regulation of interleukin-2 production; cellular response to lipopolysaccharide; positive regulation of interleukin-1 production; toll-like receptor 7 signaling pathway; defense response to Gram-positive bacterium; regulation of transcription by RNA polymerase II
Sources:Amigo / QuickGO
Orthologs
Databases	NCBI: entry; OMA: entry
Species	Human	Mouse
Entrez	84868	171285
Ensembl	ENSG00000135077	ENSMUSG00000020399
UniProt	Q8TDQ0	Q8VIM0
RefSeq (mRNA)	NM_032782	NM_134250
RefSeq (protein)	NP_116171	NP_599011
Location (UCSC)	Chr 5: 157.09 – 157.14 Mb	Chr 11: 46.35 – 46.37 Mb
PubMed search
- Wikidata
View/Edit Human	View/Edit Mouse

Hepatitis A virus cellular receptor 2 (HAVCR2), also known as T-cell immunoglobulin and mucin-domain containing-3 (TIM-3), is a protein that in humans is encoded by the HAVCR2 (TIM-3) gene. HAVCR2 was first described in 2002 as a cell surface molecule expressed on IFNγ producing CD4+ Th1 and CD8+ Tc1 cells. Later, the expression was detected in Th17 cells, regulatory T-cells, and innate immune cells (dendritic cells, NK cells, monocytes, macrophages). HAVCR2 receptor is a regulator of the immune response.

== Discovery ==
In a screen to identify differentially expressed molecules between Th1 and Th2 cells, Vijay Kuchroo and colleagues first described HAVCR2/TIM-3 in 2002. Kuchroo was the first to characterize the inhibitory function of TIM-3 and its role in inhibiting T cell responses in both autoimmunity and cancer. Similar to other checkpoint inhibitors such as PD-1 and CTLA-4, TIM-3 has been successfully targeted to treat several solid and hematogenous malignancies, including melanoma, AML, and MDS.

== Classification ==
HAVCR2 /TIM-3 is member of TIM immunoregulatory proteins family which is encoded by gene on mouse chromosome 11B1.1 and on human chromosome 5q33.2. This chromosomal region has been repeatedly linked with asthma, allergy and autoimmunity. The TIM gene family include another eight members (TIM-1–8) on mouse chromosome and three members (TIM-1, TIM-3 and TIM-4) on human chromosome.

== Structure ==
HAVCR2 belongs to TIM family cell surface receptor proteins. These proteins share a similar structure, in which the extracellular region consists of membrane distal single variable immunoglobulin domain (IgV), a glycosylated mucin domain of variable length located closer to the membrane transmembrane region, and intracellular stem. The IGV domain is formed by two antiparallel beta sheets that are linked by disulfide bridges between four conserved cysteines. Cysteine bridges create a CC´ loop and an FG loop in the domain which make unique cleft characteristics for TIM-3 proteins. The cleft is stabilized by disulfide and hydrogen bonds and is a binding site for ligands such as CEACAM-1 and phosphatidylserine. The extracellular portion of the IgV domain may also be glycosylated and this glycan-binding sites is recognizes by carbohydrate domain of another ligands galectin-9 (Gal-9). The mucin domain is variable in a member of the TIM family, in TIM3 it is the smallest domain and has regions rich in serine, proline and threonine. This region also contains target sites for O- and N-linked glycosylation. The transmembrane domain anchors the HAVCR2 protein in the cytoplasmic membrane of the cell. The intracellular domain of HAVCR2 is called C-terminal cytoplasmic tail. It contains five conserved tyrosine residues that interact with multiple components of T-cell receptor (TCR) complex, mediates intercellular signaling pathways and negatively regulates its function.

== Function ==
HAVCR2/TIM-3 is a transmembrane protein of T lymphocytes (CD4^{+} and CD8^{+} T cells), other lymphocytes (like NK cells), myeloid cells (monocytes, macrophages, DC, mast cells), or various cells in different tumor types. The receptor is an immune checkpoint and together with other inhibitory receptors including programmed cell death protein 1 (PD-1) and lymphocyte activation gene 3 protein (LAG3) mediate the CD8+ T-cell exhaustion in terms of proliferation and secretion of cytokines such as TNF-alpha, IFN-gamma and IL-2. Combined blockade of HAVCR2 and PD-1 led to improved CD8+ T-cell response during the lymphocytic choriomeningitis virus infection. HAVCR2 and PD-1 may be responsible for NK cell exhaustion as well. Similarly, HAVCR2/TIM-3 and VSIR/VISTA may co-exist on macrophages infiltrating different human and mouse tumours where they can co-regulate immunotherapy resistance. HAVCR2 has also been shown as a CD4+ Th1-specific cell surface protein that regulates macrophage activation, regulates the production of cytokines and enhances the severity of experimental autoimmune encephalomyelitis in mice. Is also known the free form of HAVCR2 outside the cell membrane (soluble form), lacking mucin and the transmembrane domain. However, the function of the soluble protein is unknown.

=== Ligands ===
==== Gal-9 ====
HAVCR2 is primarily activated by soluble galectin-9. The engagement leads to stimulation of an influx of calcium to intracellular space and induction of programmed cell death, apoptosis, cell necrosis or T cell anergy. As a consequence, a suppression of Th1 and Th17 responses and induction of immune tolerance occurs, gal-9/HAVCR2 increases the immunosuppressive activity of Treg cells. In addition to galectin-9, several ligands have been identified, such as phosphatidylserine (PtdSer), High Mobility Group Protein 1 (HMGB1) and Carcinoembryonic Antigen Related Cell Adhesion Molecule 1 (CEACAM1).

==== PtdSer ====
PtdSer is exposed on the surface of apoptotic cells and binds through the FG loop in the IgV domain. The binding of PtdSer with TIM-3 receptor has been shown to cause an uptake of apoptotic cells and is responsible for the cross-presentation of dying cell-associated antigens by dendritic cells. PtdSer binds to the opposite side of the IgV domain of TIM-3 than Gal-9, and although this interaction of PtdSer to TIM-3 has five times less affinity than other members of the TIM family, Tim-3 can also bind some other ligand to phagocytose apoptotic cells.

==== HMGB1 ====
HMGB1 is alarmin and interacts with DNA released from dying cells or pathogen nucleid acid, facilitating absorption by cell and increasing nucleic acid sensing by endosomal Toll-like receptors (TLRs). HMGB1 binds to HAVCRS2/TIM3 on dendritic cells but its binding site has not been determined. TIM-3 receptor prevents the entry of the nucleic acids into the cell and suppresses activation of TLR signaling in dendritic cells. So the binding of HMGB1suppresses activation of innate immune response.

==== CEACAM1 ====
The last known TIM3 receptor ligand is CEACAM1 glycoprotein. It is co-expressed with TIM3 T cells but also monocytes, macrophages, dendritic cells. It binds to the CC´ and FG loops of the TIM3 protein. CEACAM1 can also bind to TIM3 intracellularly (cis presentation) and is likely to be important for TIM-3 maturation on cell surface. The CEACAM1 binding contributes to the development of T cell tolerance, triggers the release of BAT3 from TIM-3 leading to inhibition of TCR signaling, and also inhibits the immune response of myeloid cells.

== Clinical significance ==
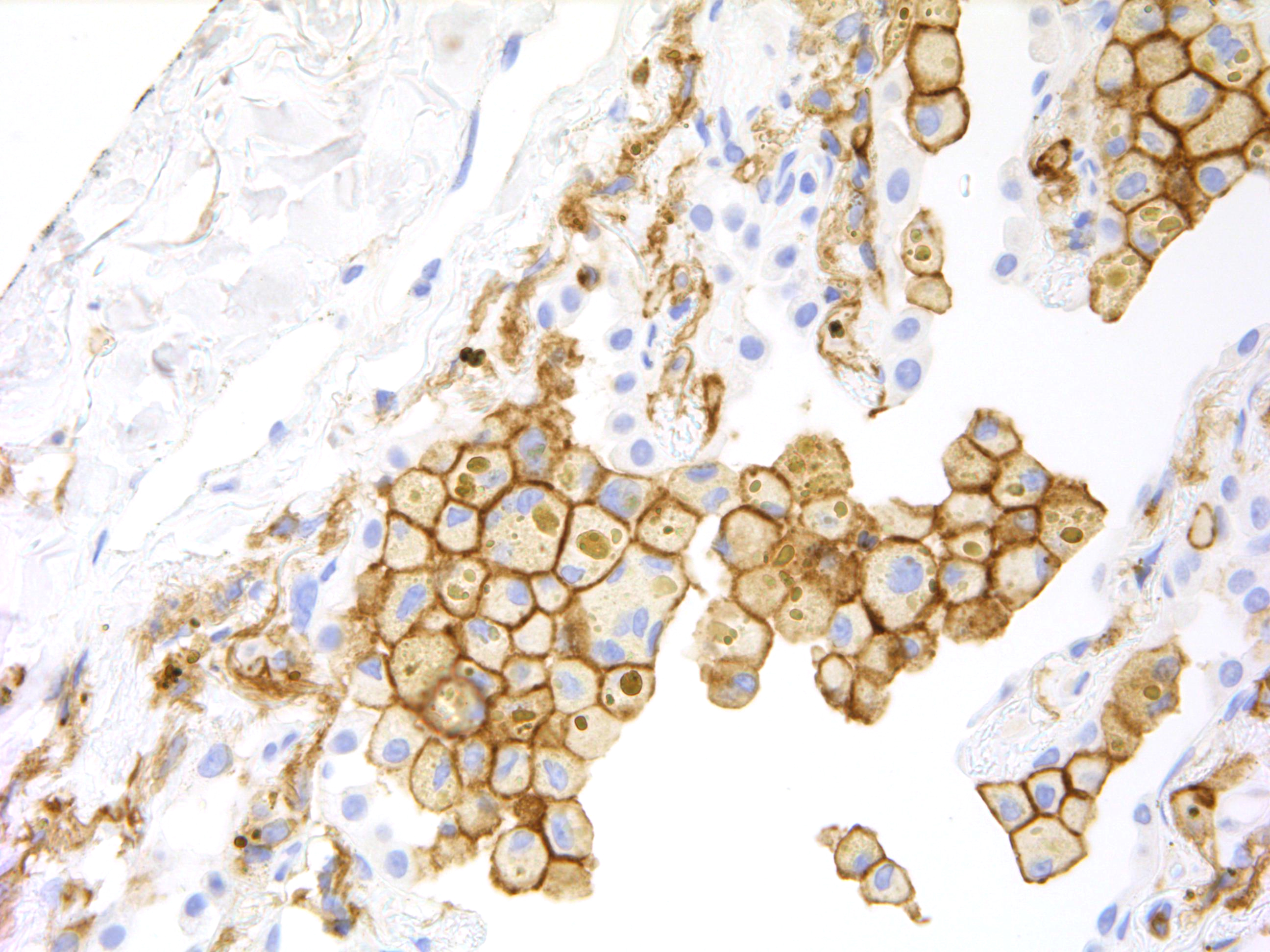
Immunohistochemical analysis of HAVCR2 in paraffin-embedded human lung carcinoma tissue.

HAVCR2 expression is up regulated in tumor-infiltrating lymphocytes in lung, gastric, head and neck cancer, schwannoma, melanoma and follicular B-cell non-Hodgkin lymphoma. It is also up-regulated in tumour-associated macrophages in various malignancies, including melanoma, especially in immunotherapy-resistant context.

The HAVCR2 pathway may interact with the PD-1 pathway in the dysfunctional CD8^{+} T cells and Tregs in cancer. HAVCR2 is mainly expressed on activated CD8^{+} T cells and suppresses macrophage activation following PD-1 inhibition. Upregulation was observed in tumors progressing after anti-PD-1 therapy. This seems to be a form of adaptive resistance to immunotherapy. Multiple phase 1/2 clinical trials with anti-HAVCR2 monoclonal antibodies (LY3321367, Eli Lilly and Company; MBG453, Novartis Pharmaceuticals; TSR-022, Tesaro, Inc.) in combination with anti-PD-1 or anti-PD-L1 therapies are ongoing.

HAVCR2 is also an exhaustion marker for NK cells. Blockade of this receptor can improve the NK cells antitumor activity in esophageal cancer, melanoma and lung adenocarcinoma.

The role of HAVCR2 in the T-cell dysfunction has been investigated in chronic viral infections. Together with PD-1, HAVCR2 negatively regulate CD8+ T-cells and thus, in vivo blockade of HAVCR2 and PD-1 led to the restoring of antiviral immunity.

A recent genome-wide association study (GWAS) has found that genetic variations in HAVCR2 are associated with late-onset sporadic Alzheimer's disease (LOAD). HARVC2 is capable of interacting with amyloid-β precursor protein.
