= Estelle Grelier =

French politician

Secretary of state for the Territorial collectivity
- In office 11 February 2016 – 10 May 2017
- President: François Hollande
- Prime Minister: Manuel Valls; Bernard Cazeneuve
- Preceded by: Philippe Richert

Member of the National Assembly for Seine-Maritime's 9th constituency
- In office 2012–2017
- Preceded by: Daniel Fidelin
- Succeeded by: Stéphanie Kerbarh

Member of the European Parliament
- In office 2009–2012
- Preceded by: Jean-Louis Cottigny

Personal details
- Born: 22 June 1973 (age 53) La Roche-sur-Yon, France
- Party: Socialist Party
- Education: Grenoble Institute of Political Studies

Estelle Grelier (born 22 June 1973) is a French politician of the Socialist Party (PS) who served as Secretary of State for Local Authorities in the governments of successive Prime Ministers Manuel Valls and Bernard Cazeneuve from 2016 until 2017.

== Political career ==
Grelier was a Member of the European Parliament from 2009 until 2012 for the North-West constituency. In parliament, she served on the Committee on Budgets.

Following the 2012 French legislative election, Grelier became a member of the National Assembly, where she served on the Committee on European Affairs until 2016.
