= HAVCR1 =

Protein-coding gene in the species Homo sapiens

Identifiers
- Aliases: HAVCR1, HAVCR, HAVCR-1, KIM-1, KIM1, TIM, TIM-1, TIM1, TIMD-1, TIMD1, CD365, hepatitis A virus cellular receptor 1
- External IDs: OMIM: 606518; MGI: 2159680; GeneCards: HAVCR1
Available structures
PDB	Ortholog search: PDBe RCSB
PDB	List of PDB id codes 5DZO, 5F70

Gene location (Human)
Chr.	Chromosome 5 (human)
Band	5q33.3	Start	157,029,413 bp
Band	5q33.3	End	157,059,119 bp

Gene location (Mouse)
Chr.	Chromosome 11 (mouse)
Band	11|11 B1.1	Start	46,625,907 bp
Band	11|11 B1.1	End	46,670,405 bp
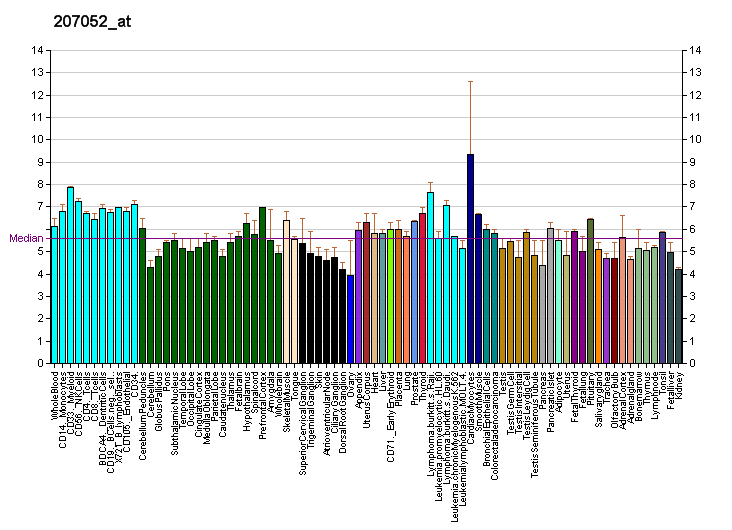
RNA expression pattern
Bgee	Human / Mouse (ortholog); Top expressed in: testicle; human kidney; rectum; gonad; granulocyte; epithelium of colon; lymph node; blood; endometrium; islet of Langerhans / Top expressed in: blastocyst; zygote; decidua; morula; secondary oocyte; mesenteric lymph nodes; embryo; primary oocyte; proximal tubule; spleen; More reference expression data
BioGPS	More reference expression data
Gene ontology
Molecular function	virus receptor activity
Cellular component	integral component of membrane; motile cilium; membrane
Biological process	viral process; viral entry into host cell
Sources:Amigo / QuickGO
Orthologs
Databases	NCBI: entry; OMA: entry
Species	Human	Mouse
Entrez	26762	171283
Ensembl	ENSG00000113249	ENSMUSG00000040405
UniProt	Q96D42	Q5QNS5
RefSeq (mRNA)	NM_001099414; NM_001173393; NM_001308156; NM_012206	NM_001166631; NM_001166632; NM_134248
RefSeq (protein)	NP_001166864; NP_001295085; NP_036338	NP_001160103; NP_001160104; NP_599009
Location (UCSC)	Chr 5: 157.03 – 157.06 Mb	Chr 11: 46.63 – 46.67 Mb
PubMed search
- Wikidata
View/Edit Human	View/Edit Mouse

Hepatitis A virus cellular receptor 1 (HAVcr-1) also known as T-cell immunoglobulin and mucin domain 1 (TIM-1) is a protein that in humans is encoded by the HAVCR1 gene.

It is also known as KIM-1 Kidney Injury Molecule -1, which is a type 1 transmembrane protein the most highly upregulated in injured kidneys by various types of insults. Its upregulation during renal injury has been found in the kidneys of the vertebrates such as Zebrafish and humans.

The hepatitis A virus cellular receptor 1 (HAVCR1/TIM-1), is a member of the TIM (T cell transmembrane, immunoglobulin, and mucin) gene family, which plays critical roles in regulating immune cell activity especially regarding the host response to viral infection. TIM-1 is also involved in allergic response, asthma, and transplant tolerance.

The TIM gene family was first cloned from the mouse model of asthma in 2001. Subsequently, it was demonstrated that members of the TIM gene family including TIM-1 participate in host immune response. The mouse TIM gene family contains eight members (TIM-1-8) while only three TIM genes (TIM-1, TIM-3, and TIM-4) have been identified in humans.

== Structure and function ==
TIM genes belong to type I cell-surface glycoproteins, which include an N-terminal immunoglobulin (Ig)-like domain, a mucin domain with distinct length, a single transmembrane domain, and a C-terminal short cytoplasmic tail. The localization and functions of TIM genes are divergent between each member. TIM-1 is preferentially expressed on Th2 cells and has been identified as a stimulatory molecule for T-cell activation. TIM-3 is preferentially expressed on Th1 and Tc1 cells and function as an inhibitory molecule, which mediated apoptosis of Th1 and Tc1 cells. TIM-4 is preferentially expressed on antigen-presenting cells, modulating the phagocytosis of apoptotic cells by interacting with phosphatidylserine (PS) exposed on apoptotic cell surface.

== Role in viral infection ==
TIM genes are also involved in host-virus interaction. As receptors for phosphatidylserine, TIM proteins bind many families of viruses [filovirus, flavivirus, New World arenavirus and alphavirus] that include viruses such as dengue and ebola. Entry of Lassa fever virus, influenza A virus, and SARS coronavirus were not affected by TIM-1 expression. TIM-1 and TIM-4 enhanced viral entry more than TIM-3.

=== Hepatitis A ===
TIM-1 has been identified as an attachment factor for exosome-packaged hepatitis A virus (HAV). Infectious HAV-containing exosomes are internalized by HAVCR1, but true entry into the cytosol is achieved through fusion with NPC1. It has also been shown that non-exosomal HAV (encapsidated) infection occurs independent of HAVCR1 expression. By using an expression cloning library, IgA has been demonstrated as a specific ligand of TIM-1. The association of TIM-1 and IgA was able to enhance the virus-receptor interaction.

=== Ebola ===
Recently, TIM-1 has been shown to be a receptor or cofactor for Ebola virus entry. TIM-1 binds to Ebola virus glycoproteins (GP) and mediates Ebola virus cellular entry by increasing Ebola virus infectivity in cell lines with a low susceptibility. Moreover, reducing expression of endogenous TIM-1 in highly permissive cell lines decreased Ebola virus infectivity. Furthermore, TIM-1 IgV domain specific antibody ARD5 inhibited Ebola virus infectivity, indicating that TIM-1 was critical for Ebola virus entry. Also, TIM-1 expression on human mucosal epithelial cells from the trachea, cornea and conjunctiva demonstrated the correlation of TIM-1 expression feature and viral entry routes.

=== Dengue ===
TIM-1 has been identified as a cellular factor for Dengue virus entry by overexpression of TIM-1 on poorly susceptible cell lines for Dengue virus infection. TIM-1 enhanced dengue virus infectivity by 500-fold, particularly increased virus internalization. TIM-1 directly interacted with Dengue virus particle by recognizing PS on the virion surface. In addition, the Dengue virus susceptibility of different cell lines was consistent with endogenous expression level of TIM-1 gene in such cell lines, suggesting that TIM-1 is crucial for Dengue virus entry.
