= Plunkett Lake Press =

American publishing company

Plunkett Lake Press is a publishing company based in Lexington, Massachusetts. It was founded by Patrick Mehr in 2010. PLP e-publishes classics of non-fiction: biographies, memoirs and texts of historical interest with a focus on Central Europe, such as Under a Cruel Star by Heda Margolius Kovaly and Defying Hitler by Sebastian Haffner.

PLP e-publishes literary non-fiction about several topics, including France, Germany, Israel, immigration, and science. Most Plunkett Lake Press eBooks are in English; some are in French and German. A few titles are also available in paperback. Plunkett Lake Press's eBooks are available worldwide in the Amazon/Kindle, Apple iBooks, Nook and Kobo formats.

Plunkett Lake Press offers a roster of non-fiction by Stefan Zweig, including his autobiography The World of Yesterday and his biographies of Balzac, Erasmus of Rotterdam, Joseph Fouché, Magellan, Marie Antoinette, Freud, and Mary Stuart.

Other Plunkett Lake Press authors include Jean-Denis Bredin, Abba Eban, Amos Elon, Albert Memmi, Susan Quinn, Emilio Segrè and Chaim Weizmann.
