= Francisco J. Quintana =

Argentinean-American immunologist and neuroscientist

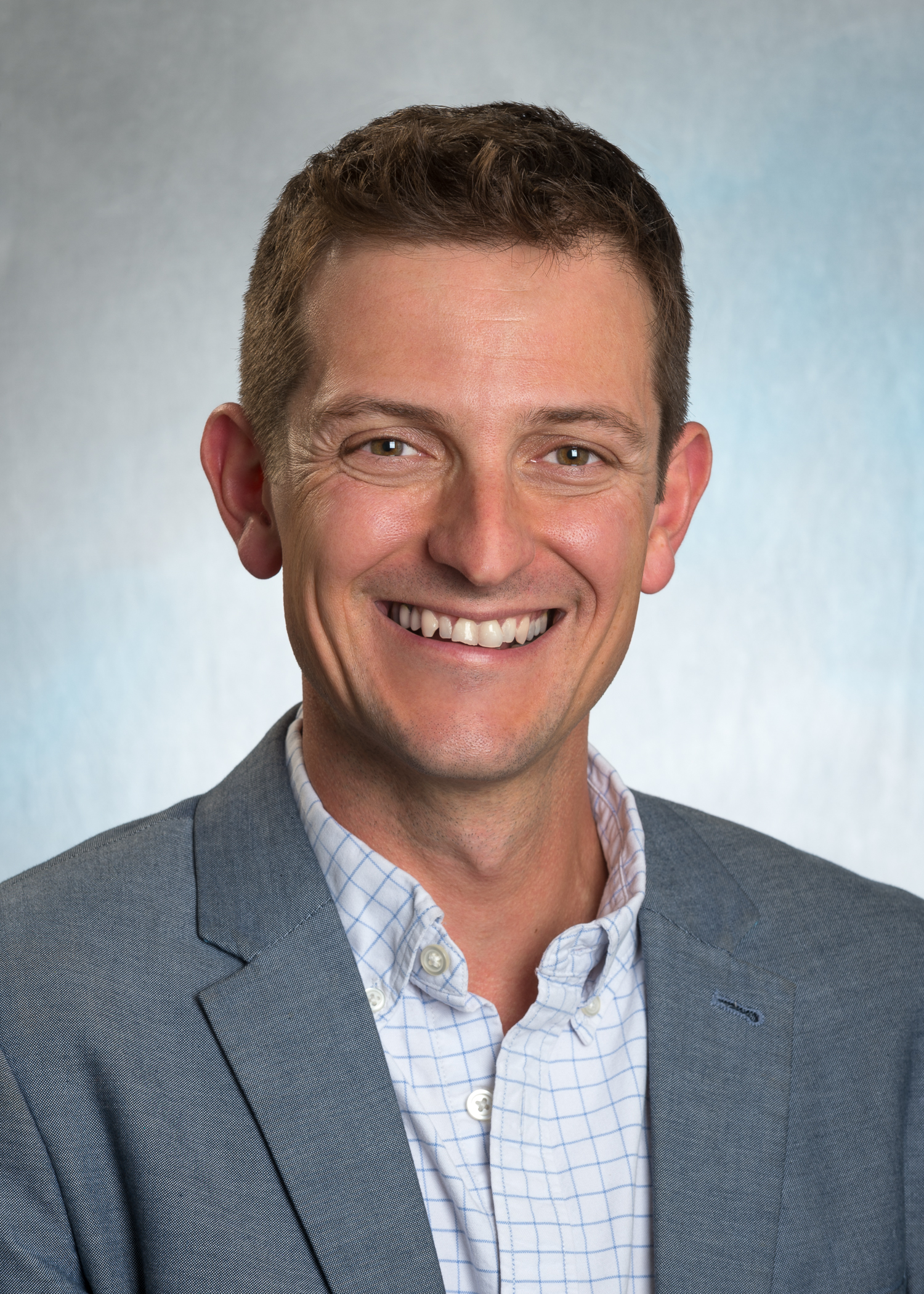
- Education: Weizmann Institute of Science, PhD
- Website: https://quintanalab.bwh.harvard.edu

Francisco J. Quintana is an Argentinean-American immunologist and neuroscientist, and Professor of Neurology at Harvard Medical School.

== Education and career ==
Quintana joined Brigham and Women's Hospital and Harvard Medical School as a postdoctoral fellow in 2005 where he was advised by Dr. Howard L. Weiner. In 2018, Quintana was appointed Professor of Neurology with tenure. Quintana is also an Associate Member of the Broad Institute of MIT and Harvard.
