= Charles Revet =

French politician (1937–2021)

Member of the French Senate for Seine-Maritime
- In office 24 September 1995 – 30 September 2019
- Succeeded by: Pascal Martin

President of the General council of Seine-Maritime
- In office 1993–2004
- Preceded by: André Martin
- Succeeded by: Didier Marie

Member of the National Assembly for Seine-Maritime's 9th constituency
- In office 1993–1995
- Preceded by: Frédérique Bredin
- Succeeded by: Frédérique Bredin

Personal details
- Born: 9 November 1937; Turretot, France
- Died: 30 November 2021 (aged 84); Turretot, France
- Political party: UDF; UMP; The Republicans
- Profession: Farmer

Charles Revet (9 November 1937 – 30 November 2021) was a French politician who was a member of the Senate of France, representing the Seine-Maritime department. He was a member of the Union for a Popular Movement.
