= Stéphanie Kerbarh =

French politician (born 1975)

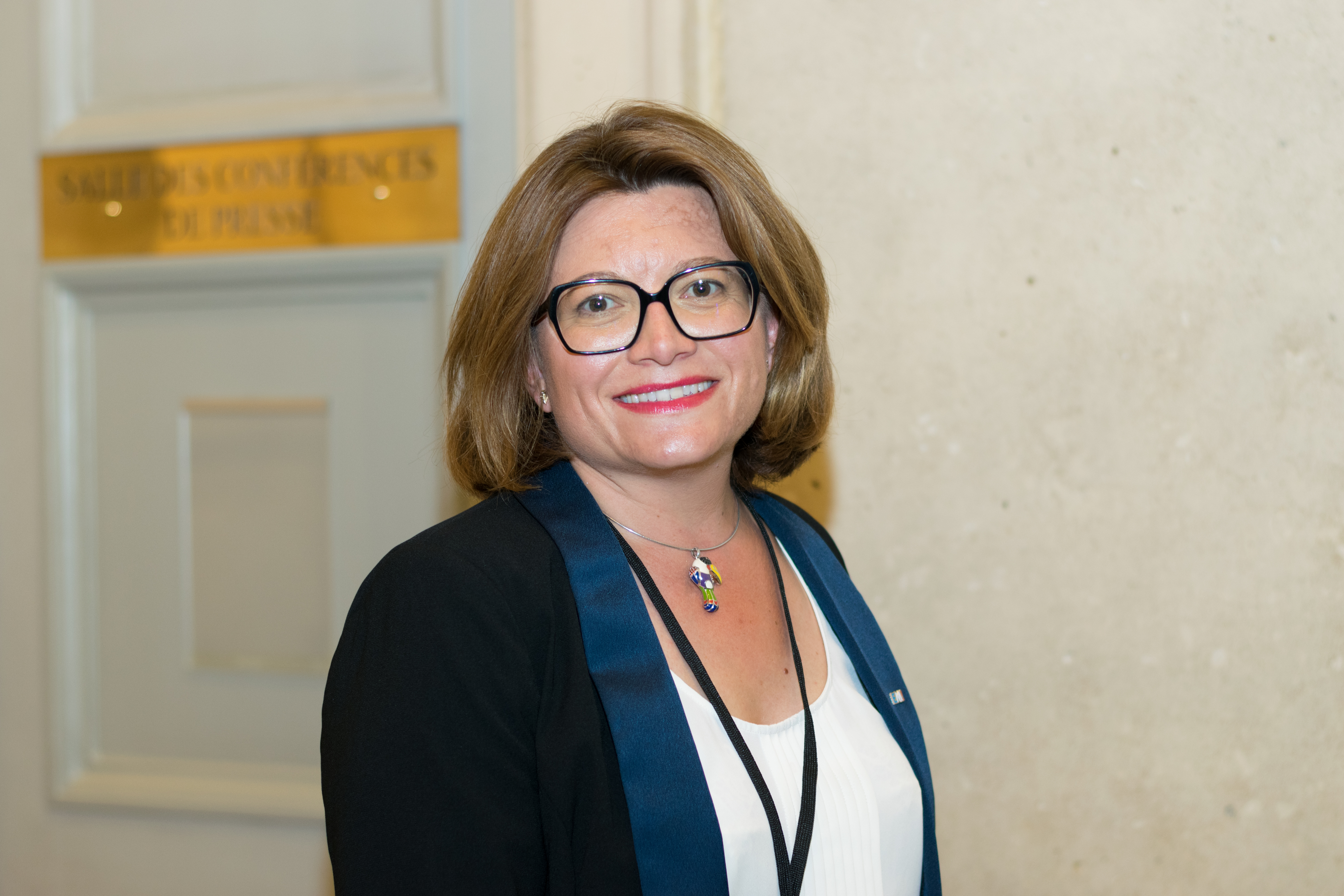
- Stéphanie Kerbarh in 2017

Member of the National Assembly for Seine-Maritime's 9th constituency
- In office 21 June 2017 – June 2022
- Preceded by: Estelle Grelier
- Succeeded by: Marie-Agnès Poussier-Winsback

Personal details
- Born: 31 July 1975 (age 51) Orléans, France
- Party: La République En Marche! (2017–2021)
- Education: University of Le Havre

Stéphanie Kerbarh (born 31 July 1975) is a French politician who served as a member of the French National Assembly from 2017 to 2022, representing the department of Seine-Maritime. From 2017 until 2021, she was a member of La République En Marche! (LREM).

== Political career ==
In parliament, Kerbarh served as member of the Committee on Sustainable Development and Spatial Planning. In addition to her committee assignments, she was part of the parliamentary friendship groups with Belgium, India and Somalia. In 2020, Kerbarh joined En commun (EC), a group within LREM led by Barbara Pompili.

After announcing her decision to run a non-LREM ticket in the 2021 regional elections, Kerbarh was excluded from the party. She stood in the 2022 French legislative election as a miscellaneous centre candidate but lost her seat in the first round. The seat was won in the second round by Marie-Agnès Poussier-Winsback from the Horizons party.

== Political positions ==
In July 2019, Kerbarh decided not to align with her parliamentary group's majority and became one of 52 LREM members who abstained from a vote on the French ratification of the European Union’s Comprehensive Economic and Trade Agreement (CETA) with Canada.

== See also ==
- 2017 French legislative election
