= Seine-Maritime's 9th constituency =

Constituency of the National Assembly of France

9th constituency of Seine-Maritime
- inline Constituency of the National Assembly of France

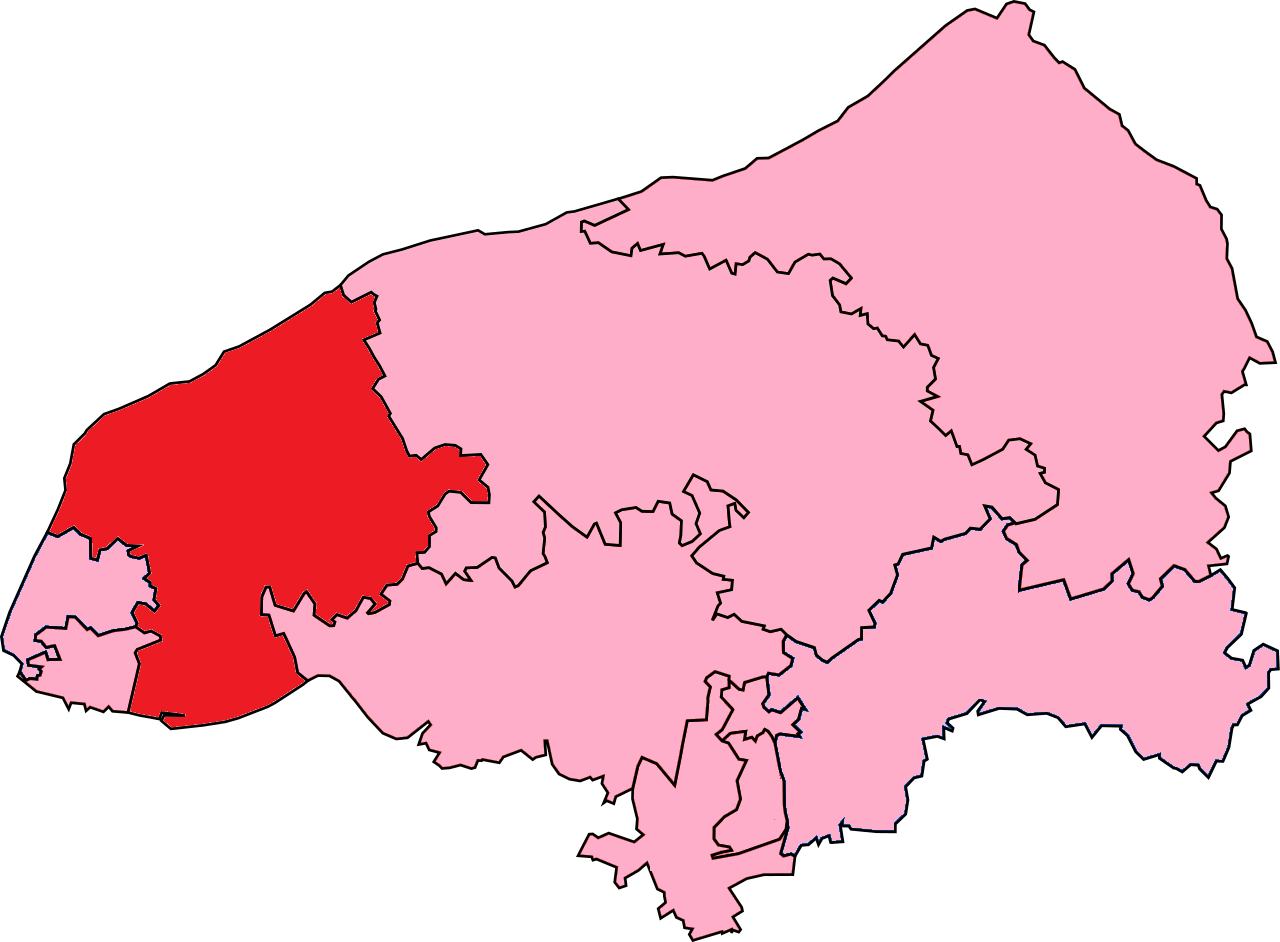
- Seine-Maritime's 9th Constituency shown within Seine-Maritime
- Deputy: Marie-Agnès Poussier-Winsback; H
- Department: Seine-Maritime
- Cantons: Bolbec, Criquetot-l'Esneval, Fauville-en-Caux, Fécamp, Goderville, Saint-Romain-de-Colbosc, Valmont
- Registered voters: 93669

The 9th constituency of the Seine-Maritime (French: Neuvième circonscription de la Seine-Maritime) is a French legislative constituency in the Seine-Maritime département. Like the other 576 French constituencies, it elects one MP using the two-round system, with a run-off if no candidate receives over 50% of the vote in the first round.

== Description ==
The 9th Constituency of the Seine-Maritime includes the coast and some inland areas to the north and east of Le Havre. At the northern end of the constituency is the fishing port of Fécamp.

The seat has swung between left and right since 1988 broadly in line with the national picture. In 2017 keeping with this pattern the constituency elected the candidate of Emmanuel Macron's En Marche! party.

== Assembly Members ==
Election	Member	Party
1958	Louis Delaporte	CNIP
1962	Louis Boisson	SFIO
1967	Raymond Offroy	UDR
1968	Raymond Offroy	UDR
1973	Raymond Offroy	UDR
1978	Irénée Bourgois	PCF
1981	Jean Beaufils	PS
1986	Proportional representation – no election by constituency	
1988	Frédérique Bredin	PS
1993	Charles Revet	UDF
1997	Frédérique Bredin	PS
2000	Patrick Jeanne	PS
2002	Daniel Fidelin	UMP
2007	Daniel Fidelin	UMP
2012	Estelle Grelier	PS
2017	Stéphanie Kerbarh	LREM
2021	Stéphanie Kerbarh	PRV
2022	Marie-Agnès Poussier-Winsback	H

== Election results ==
=== 2024 ===
Legislative Election 2024: Seine-Maritime's 9th constituency
Party	Candidate	Votes	%	±%
RN	Douglas Potier	28,528	44.58	+15.33
DIV	Aude de Castet	392	0.61	N/A
LO	René Pinato	1,122	1.75	N/A
HOR (Ensemble)	Marie-Agnès Poussier-Winsback	20,528	32.08	+3.71
DVG	Solène Morel	1	0.01	N/A
DLF	Patrick Bucourt	967	1.51	N/A
LFI (NFP)	Christiane Rouxel	11,845	18.51	−1.82
REC	Christophe Ros	615	0.96	−1.58
Turnout		63,998	97.03	+47.24
Registered electors		95,433		
2nd round result
HOR	Marie-Agnès Poussier-Winsback	31,548	50.34	−0.50
RN	Douglas Potier	31,122	49.66	+0.50
Turnout		62,670	94.97	+46097
Registered electors		95,448		
HOR hold		Swing		

=== 2022 ===
Legislative Election 2022: Seine-Maritime's 9th constituency
Party	Candidate	Votes	%	±%
RN	Nicolas Goury	13,591	29.25	+11.95
HOR (Ensemble)	Marie-Agnès Poussier-Winsback	13,184	28.37	-0.38
LFI (NUPÉS)	Stéphanie Fouani	9,449	20.33	−14.35
LR (UDC)	Victor Balier	2,176	4.68	−10.08
FGR	Mickaël Baron	1,725	3.71	N/A
PRV	Stéphanie Kerbarh*	1,555	3.35	N/A
REC	Jean Marc Bled	1,181	2.54	N/A
LREM	Victor Fournier**	1,133	2.44	N/A
Others	N/A	2,477		
Turnout		47,624	49.79	−2.82
2nd round result
HOR (Ensemble)	Marie-Agnès Poussier-Winsback	21,352	50.84	-12.10
RN	Nicolas Goury	20,644	49.16	+12.10
Turnout		41,996	48.00	+2.48
HOR hold				

* PRV dissident
** LREM dissident

=== 2017 ===
Legislative Election 2017: Seine-Maritime's 9th constituency
Party	Candidate	Votes	%	±%
LREM	Stéphanie Kerbarh	13,855	28.75	N/A
FN	Geneviève Salvisberg	8,336	17.30	+2.66
PS	Estelle Grelier	8,187	16.99	−21.07
UDI	Didier Peralta	7,115	14.76	N/A
LFI	Rachid Chebli	5,454	11.32	N/A
PCF	Céline Brulin	2,019	4.19	−3.91
DLF	Patrick Bucourt	1,076	2.23	N/A
EELV	Thierry Lecerf	1,052	2.18	−0.43
Others	N/A	1,097		
Turnout		49,281	52.61	−6.11
2nd round result
LREM	Stéphanie Kerbarh	23,852	62.94	N/A
FN	Geneviève Salvisberg	14,045	37.06	N/A
Turnout		42,636	45.52	−12.31
LREM gain from PS		Swing		

=== 2012 ===
Legislative Election 2012: Seine-Maritime's 9th constituency
Party	Candidate	Votes	%	±%
PS	Estelle Grelier	20,654	38.06	+10.82
UMP	Daniel Fidelin	18,180	33.51	−13.06
FN	Geneviève Salvisberg	7,944	14.64	+10.83
FG	Céline Brulin	4,393	8.10	+4.94
EELV	Alain Plantaz	1,417	2.61	−0.56
Others	N/A	1,672		
Turnout		54,260	58.72	−3.47
2nd round result
PS	Estelle Grelier	29,069	54.40	+7.56
UMP	Daniel Fidelin	24,369	45.60	−7.56
Turnout		53,438	57.83	−4.90
PS gain from UMP				

=== 2007 ===
Legislative Election 2007: Seine-Maritime's 9th constituency
Party	Candidate	Votes	%	±%
UMP	Daniel Fidelin	24,327	46.57	+6.89
PS	Estelle Grelier	14,228	27.24	−6.37
MoDem	Daniel Duchemin	3,683	7.05	N/A
FN	Yves Robert	1,992	3.81	−8.09
LV	Jean Vittrant	1,654	3.17	−0.01
PCF	Véronique Blondel	1,650	3.16	+0.31
Far left	François Racé	1,444	2.76	N/A
Others	N/A	3,260		
Turnout		53,161	62.19	−2.73
2nd round result
UMP	Daniel Fidelin	27,758	53.16	+1.73
PS	Estelle Grelier	24,461	46.84	−1.73
Turnout		53,618	62.73	−1.44
UMP hold				

=== 2002 ===
Legislative Election 2002: Seine-Maritime's 9th constituency
Party	Candidate	Votes	%	±%
UMP	Daniel Fidelin	20,436	39.68	N/A
PS	Patrick Jeanne	17,310	33.61	−5.06
FN	Jean-Francois Touze	6,130	11.90	−0.36
LV	F.Marie Michaux	1,639	3.18	+0.26
PCF	Jean-Claude Blondel	1,467	2.85	−4.16
CPNT	Stephanie Carton	1,447	2.81	N/A
LCR	Dominique Pierre	1,150	2.23	N/A
Others	N/A	1,923		
Turnout		52,649	64.92	−7.01
2nd round result
UMP	Daniel Fidelin	25,794	51.43	N/A
PS	Patrick Jeanne	24,359	48.57	−7.31
Turnout		52,038	64.17	−10.34
UMP gain from PS				

=== 1997 ===
Legislative Election 1997: Seine-Maritime's 9th constituency
Party	Candidate	Votes	%	±%
PS	Frédérique Bredin	20,167	38.67	
UDF	Daniel Fidelin	15,412	29.55	
FN	Guy Bourle	6,396	12.26	
PCF	Raymond Lecacheur	3,656	7.01	
LV	Gilbert Cloarec	1,522	2.92	
DVD	Claude Courbot	1,519	2.91	
GE	Robert Berthet	1,156	2.22	
Others	N/A	2,324		
Turnout		54,444	71.93	
2nd round result
PS	Frédérique Bredin	29,945	55.88	
UDF	Daniel Fidelin	23,647	44.12	
Turnout		56,397	74.51	
PS gain from UDF				
