= Jean-Denis Bredin =

French writer and lawyer (1929–2021)

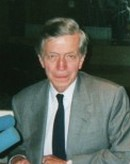
- Born: Jean-Denis Hirsch; 17 May 1929; Paris, France
- Died: 1 September 2021 (aged 92); Paris, France
- Occupation: Lawyer
- Employer: Bredin Prat
- Known for: Member of the Académie Française
- Family: Frédérique Bredin (daughter)

Jean-Denis Bredin (born Jean-Denis Hirsch: 17 May 1929 – 1 September 2021) was a French attorney and founding partner of the firm Bredin Prat. He was widely admired as an author-commentator, both for his novels and for his non-fiction works, with a particular focus on recent and contemporary history. On 15 June 1989, he was elected to membership of the Académie Française, becoming the twentieth occupant of seat 3, which had been vacated through the death of Marguerite Yourcenar. His daughter, Frédérique Bredin, served between 2013 and 2019 as President of the French National Center of Cinematography and the moving image.

Bredin died on 1 September 2021 aged 92.

== Bibliography ==
- Traité de droit du commerce international, en collaboration avec le doyen Loussouarn – Sirey – 1969
- La République de Monsieur Pompidou – Julliard – 1974
- Les Français au pouvoir – Grasset – 1977
- Éclats, en collaboration avec Jack Lang et Antoine Vitez – Simoën – 1978
- Joseph Caillaux – Hachette Littérature – 1980
- Rapport de la mission de réflexion et de propositions sur le cinéma, rapport au ministre de la Culture – 1981
- L’Affaire – Julliard – 1983
- Rapport de la mission sur l’enseignement des métiers du cinéma et de l’audiovisuel, rapport aux ministres de l’Éducation nationale, de la Culture et de l’Industrie – 1984
- Un coupable – Gallimard – 1985
- Les Nouvelles Télévisions hertziennes, rapport au Premier ministre – La Documentation française – 1985
- L’Absence – Gallimard – 1986
- La Tâche – Gallimard – 1988
- Sieyès – Le Fallois – 1989
- Un enfant sage – Gallimard – 1990
- Battements de cœur – Fayard – 1991
- Bernard Lazare – Le Fallois – 1992
- L’Affaire, nouvelle édition refondue – Fayard-Julliard – 1993
- Comédie des apparences – Odile Jacob – 1994
- Encore un peu de temps – Gallimard – 1996
- Convaincre, Dialogue sur l’éloquence, en collaboration avec Thierry Lévy – Odile Jacob – 1997
- Une singulière famille – Fayard – 1999
- Rien ne va plus – Fayard – 2000
- Lettre à Dieu le Fils – Grasset – 2001
- Un tribunal au garde-à-vous. Le procès de Pierre Mendès-France, 9 mai 1941 – Fayard – 2002
- Et des amours desquelles nous parlons – Fayard – 2004
- Mots et pas perdus – Plon – 2005
- On ne meurt qu'une fois, Charlotte Corday – Fayard – 2006
- L'infamie: Le procès de Riom – Grasset – 2012
- The Affair: The Case of Alfred Dreyfus - newly edited and translated – Plunkett Lake Press-George Braziller –
