= Frédérique Bredin =

French politician (born 1956)

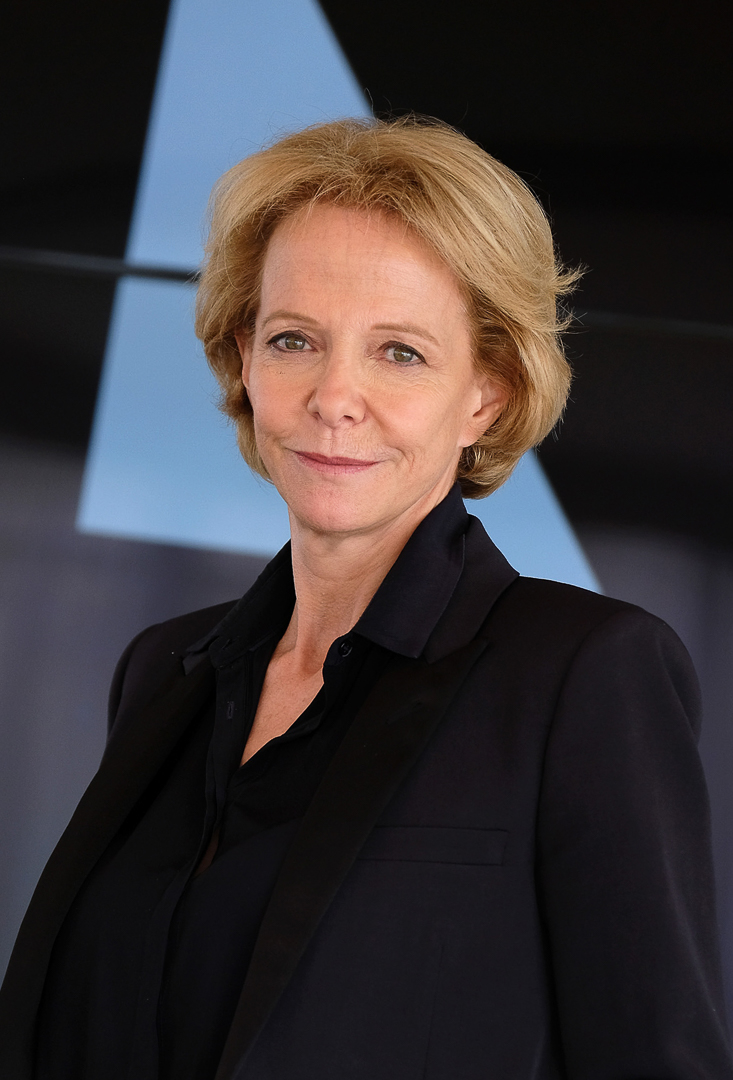
- Bredin in 2018

President of the Centre national du cinéma et de l'image animée
- In office 15 July 2013 – 12 July 2019
- Preceded by: Éric Garandeau
- Succeeded by: Dominique Boutonnat

Minister of Youth Affairs and Sports
- In office 16 May 1991 – 29 March 1993
- Prime Minister: Édith Cresson; Pierre Bérégovoy
- Preceded by: Lionel Jospin
- Succeeded by: Michèle Alliot-Marie

Member of the National Assembly for the Seine-Maritime's 9th constituency
- In office 10 December 1995 – 14 September 2000
- Preceded by: Charles Revet
- Succeeded by: Patrick Jeanne
- In office 23 June 1988 – 16 June 1991
- Preceded by: Constituency established
- Succeeded by: Jean Vittrant

Member of the European Parliament for France
- In office 19 July 1994 – 19 July 1996
- Succeeded by: Marie-Arlette Carlotti

Mayor of Fécamp
- In office 19 March 1989 – 21 December 1995
- Preceded by: Jean-Pierre Deneuve
- Succeeded by: Jean-Claude Michel

Personal details
- Born: Frédérique Marie Denise Bredin; 2 November 1956 (age 69) Paris, France
- Party: Socialist Party
- Spouse: Jean-Pascal Beaufret (m. 1985; div. 2008)
- Children: 2
- Parent(s): Jean-Denis Bredin (father); Danièle Hervier (mother)
- Education: Lycée Victor-Duruy
- Alma mater: Sciences Po; ÉNA
- Occupation: Civil servant • Politician

Frédérique Marie Denise Bredin (born 2 November 1956) is a French politician of the Socialist Party (PS) who served as president of the National Center of Cinematography and the moving image (CNC) from 2013 to 2019.

== Early life and education ==
Her father, Jean-Denis Bredin, was an attorney who was the founder of the law firm Bredin Prat.

Born in Paris, Bredin graduated from the Paris Institute of Political Studies, as well as the École nationale d'administration, graduating in 1980 alongside fellow French Socialist Party (PS) politicians François Hollande, Michel Sapin, and Ségolène Royal.

== Political career ==
Bredin began her political career serving under Jack Lang during his time as Culture Minister of France, then in 1986 became cultural advisor to President François Mitterrand. She ran in the 1988 legislative election out of a constituency in Seine-Maritime. She won election to the National Assembly, and at 31 years of age she was the youngest member of the Assembly at that time. In 1989, Bredin was elected mayor of Fécamp.

On 16 May 1991, Bredin was named Minister of Youth Affairs and Sports. She held that position until 29 March 1993, when the PS was removed from power.

In the 1994 European Parliament elections, the PS won 15 seats; Bredin was awarded one of them, and served until 1996. In 1995, she was named national secretary for the PS, with her role placing an emphasis on culture and communication; she served in that role until 2000.

== Life after politics ==
After her term ended, Bredin retired from politics and got a job at the Lagardère Active.

In the Socialist Party's 2011 primaries, Bredin endorsed Arnaud Montebourg as the party's candidate for the 2012 presidential election.

In 2013, Bredin was named president of the CNC, and was reappointed to the same position in 2016.

In 2025, Bredin stood as the Socialist candidate in a National Assembly by-election in Paris's 2nd constituency, but lost the runoff election to former prime minister Michel Barnier.

2025 National Assembly by-election: Paris's 2nd constituency
Party	Candidate	Votes	%	±%
First round
LR	Michel Barnier	8,702	45.15	
PS	Frédérique Bredin	6,101	31.66	
RN	Thierry Mariani	1,412	7.33	
REC	Hilaire Bouyé	1,144	5.94	
n/a	Others	1,914	9.93	
Total votes		19,273	100.00	
Turnout		19,541	26.18	
Second round
LR	Michel Barnier	11,180	62.62	
PS	Frédérique Bredin	6,673	37.38	
Total votes		17,853	100.00	
Turnout		18,300	24.51	
