= Protollin =

Vaccine adjuvant now being trialed as an Alzheimer's vaccine at Brigham and Women's

Protollin is a drug initially formulated as a vaccine adjuvant. It is composed of lipopolysaccharides derived from the Shigella flexneri or Pleisiomonas shigelloides bacterium combined with hydrophobic outer membrane proteins derived from Neisseria meningitidis.

On November 16, 2021, Brigham and Women's Hospital announced that it was beginning a Phase I clinical trial of Protollin as a nasally-delivered vaccine to activate the body's immune response against amyloid proteins that form in the brain and are thought to contribute to the symptoms of Alzheimer's disease. In 2026, the group reported drug safety and demonstrated some dose-dependent changes in immune markers that were consistent with their hypothesis.
