= TIMD4 =

Protein-coding gene in the species Homo sapiens

Identifiers
- Aliases: TIMD4, SMUCKLER, TIM4, T-cell immunoglobulin and mucin domain containing 4, T cell immunoglobulin and mucin domain containing 4
- External IDs: OMIM: 610096; MGI: 2445125; GeneCards: TIMD4
Available structures
PDB	Ortholog search: PDBe RCSB
PDB	List of PDB id codes 5F7H, 5DZN, 5F7F

Gene location (Human)
Chr.	Chromosome 5 (human)
Band	5q33.3	Start	156,919,292 bp
Band	5q33.3	End	156,963,226 bp

Gene location (Mouse)
Chr.	Chromosome 11 (mouse)
Band	11|11 B1.1	Start	46,701,627 bp
Band	11|11 B1.1	End	46,735,159 bp
RNA expression pattern
Bgee	Human / Mouse (ortholog); Top expressed in: left testis; right testis; sperm; lymph node; testicle; oocyte; trabecular bone; synovial joint; gonad; superficial temporal artery / Top expressed in: spleen; secondary oocyte; mesenteric lymph nodes; zygote; primary oocyte; subcutaneous adipose tissue; mammary gland; white adipose tissue; embryo; liver; More reference expression data
BioGPS	n/a
Orthologs
Databases	NCBI: entry; OMA: entry
Species	Human	Mouse
Entrez	91937	276891
Ensembl	ENSG00000145850	ENSMUSG00000055546
UniProt	Q96H15	Q6U7R4
RefSeq (mRNA)	NM_001146726; NM_138379	NM_178759
RefSeq (protein)	NP_001140198; NP_612388	NP_848874
Location (UCSC)	Chr 5: 156.92 – 156.96 Mb	Chr 11: 46.7 – 46.74 Mb
PubMed search
- Wikidata
View/Edit Human	View/Edit Mouse

T-cell immunoglobulin and mucin domain containing 4 (TIMD-4) also known as T-cell membrane protein 4 (TIM-4) is a protein in humans that is encoded by the TIMD4 gene.

== Gene ==
TIM-4 genes are in mouse present on chromosome 11B1.1 and in humans on chromosome 5q33.2. TIM-4 contains IgV domain with integrin-binding site as well as a unique metal-ion-dependent ligand binding site for phosphatidylserine. TIM-4 also contains mucin domain with high levels of O-glycosylation.

== Tissue distribution ==
Unlike other TIMs that are mainly expressed on T cells TIM-4 is expressed on APCs such as dendritic cells or macrophages.

== Structure ==
In comparison to other TIM proteins (such as TIM-1, TIM-2...) it does not contain a tyrosine-phosphorylation motif in its intracellular tail domain.

== Function ==
TIM-4 serves as a ligand for TIM-1 but also as a receptor for phosphatidylserine. Its phosphatidylserine binding however does not mediate signalling instead it works more as a tethering receptor. Its phosphatidylserine binding properties also play an important role in removal of apoptotic cells. Moreover recognition of phosphatidylserine also helps to control adaptive immune system by clearing phosphatidylserine expressing apoptotic T cells. That leads to the regulation of antigen specific memory T cells. TIM-4 is also able to inhibit naive T cells by non-TIM-1 receptor binding but once T cells are active TIM-4 works as positive regulator helping to maintain their activity. TIM-4 expression on macrophages plays an important role in their homeostatic maintenance.

== Clinical significance ==
It was shown that TIM-4 plays a role in Th2 development. As such it plays a role in the development of allergies and might be a target for future therapies. TIM-4 also mediates autophagy at the site of tumor, which leads to reduced antigen presentation leading to increased toleration of tumor by the immune system. Therefore there are studies using the blockade of TIM-4 as a complementary therapy for cancer treatment.
