= Vijay Kuchroo =

Indian-American immunologist and entrepreneur

Vijay K. Kuchroo
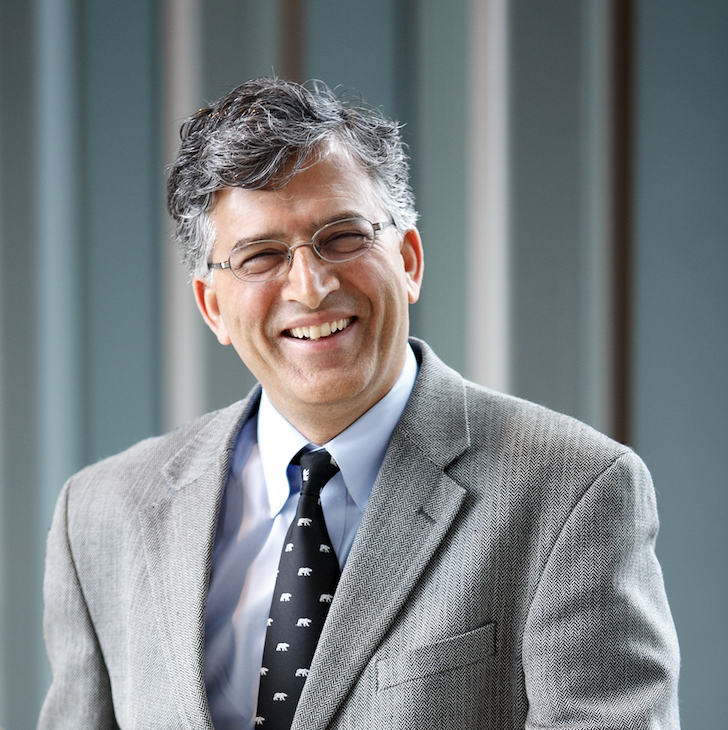
- Born: Baramulla, J&K, India
- Citizenship: United States of America
- Education: Haryana Agricultural University; University of Queensland; National Institutes of Health, Bethesda; Harvard Medical School
- Occupations: Immunologist, Entrepreneur

Vijay K. Kuchroo is an Indian-American immunologist and entrepreneur. He is the Samuel L. Wasserstrom Professor of Neurology at Harvard Medical School and Brigham & Women's Hospital, and the founding Director of The Gene Lay Institute of Immunology and Inflammation at Brigham & Women's Hospital, Massachusetts General Hospital, and Harvard Medical School in Boston, Massachusetts. He is also an Institute Member of the Broad Institute of MIT and Harvard in Cambridge, Massachusetts.

Kuchroo is known for his research in autoimmunity, neuroimmunology, and cancer immunology. Seminal work from the Kuchroo laboratory include discovery of the co-inhibitory receptor TIM-3, and other TIM family of genes, and a pathogenic immune cell subset that drives autoimmune neuroinflammation called Th17 cells.

== Career ==
Kuchroo graduated with honors from a Bachelor of Veterinary Science (equivalent to DVM) from Haryana Agricultural University, Hisar, India, and obtained a Ph.D. in Veterinary Pathology from the University of Queensland, Brisbane Australia. He then completed postdoctoral training in the United States, first at the National Institutes of Health (NIH) as a Fogarty International Fellow and subsequently as a Research Fellow in the Department of Pathology at Harvard Medical School, where he went on to join the faculty. Kuchroo later joined Harvard Medical School’s Neurology Department as a junior faculty member, and was promoted in 2004 to Professor, and Senior Scientist at Brigham & Women's Hospital. In 2005, he was named the first incumbent of the Samuel L. Wasserstrom chair of Neurology, an endowed chair established with a gift to Harvard Medical School from Boston Biotechnology company, Biogen, and named in honor of Howard Weiner’s grandfather who was killed in the Holocaust. In 2014, Kuchroo became founding Director of the Evergrande Center for Immunologic Diseases, a joint center between Harvard Medical School and Brigham & Women's Hospital dedicated to studying the molecular and genetic basis of tissue inflammation in human diseases. In 2023, he was appointed as the inaugural Director of The Gene Lay Institute of Immunology and Inflammation, which was established with a $100 million gift to Brigham & Women's Hospital from biotechnology entrepreneur and founder of BioLegend, Dr. Gene Lay, MS, DVM.

Kuchroo is on the board of directors and scientific advisory boards of multiple biotech and pharmaceutical companies.

== Research ==
Kuchroo's earlier work established myelin proteolipid protein – a major protein of the central nervous system (CNS) – as a bona fide self-antigen that induces neuroinflammation To study autoimmune inflammation in the CNS, his laboratory has generated transgenic mice models which spontaneously develop neuroinflammation, including the 2D2 T cell receptor transgenic mice which are now widely used to study CNS autoimmunity.

The immune checkpoint receptor, T-cell immunoglobulin and mucin-domain containing-3 (TIM-3, encoded by the Havcr2 gene), was first discovered by Kuchroo and his team, along with other members of the TIM family of genes in 2002. He was the first to characterize the inhibitory function of TIM-3 and its role in inhibiting T cell responses in autoimmunity and cancer. Similar to other checkpoint inhibitors such as PD-1 and CTLA-4, TIM-3 has been targeted to treat several solid and hematogenous malignancies, including melanoma, Acute Myeloid Leukemia, and myelodysplastic syndrome. Kuchroo was instrumental in shepherding anti-Tim-3 antibody from discovery through to clinic by working with a number of biotech and drug companies to its ultimate use by Novartis for treatment in cancer. Multiple clinical trials are still underway to study the therapeutic potential of TIM-3 in the treatment of human cancers.

Kuchroo's most critical contribution to the field of immunology has come from his discovery in 2005 of a novel IL-17 cytokine-producing T cell subset – Th17 cells – that drives autoimmune inflammation. This pivotal discovery by his and other research groups at the time was followed by the identification of pathways that regulate their differentiation and pro-inflammatory functions. The Kuchroo lab extensively characterized the role of Th17 cells in autoimmune disease pathogenesis, and together with bioinformatician Aviv Regev at the Broad Institute, built the regulatory network for the development. Dr. Kuchroo was instrumental in promoting clinical trials of IL-17-blockade for the treatment of autoimmune diseases, leading to successful treatment of multiple autoimmune diseases with IL-17 and IL-23 inhibitors. He was also the first to identify a link between high salt and generation of Th17 cells, suggesting a role of high salt diets in triggering autoimmune diseases, which has now been confirmed by multiple epidemiological studies in human autoimmune diseases.

Kuchroo has published over 430 peer-reviewed, original articles, and his paper reporting the development of Th17 cells is one of the highest-cited papers in the field of Immunology. Many of his groundbreaking discoveries - most notably around TIM-3 and Th17 cells - are being developed for clinical therapies, with several active clinical trials based on his research and several pharmaceutical companies founded, based on these discoveries.

== Awards ==
- 2025 - American Association of Immunologists (AAI) - Thermo Fisher Meritorious Career Award
- 2021 - John Dystel Prize for Multiple Sclerosis Research from National Multiple Sclerosis Society and the American Academy of Neurology
- 2021 - AAI Distinguished Fellow Award
- 2020 - ICIS BioLegend William E. Paul Award
- 2018 - Lupus Research Alliance Dr. William E. Paul Distinguished Innovator Award
- 2017 - Nobel Assembly Lecture at Karolinska Institute
- 2014 - Nobel Laureate Peter Doherty Distinguished Lecture / Prize
- 2011 - Ranbaxy Science Foundation Prize for Medical Research (New Delhi, India)
- 2002–2009 - NIH The Javits Neuroscience Investigator Award
- 1988–1990 - Charles A. King Trust Award, The Medical Foundation (Boston, Massachusetts)
- 1985 - NIH Fogarty International Fellow
- 1984–1985 - University of Queensland Fred Z. Eager Research Prize and Medal for the best Ph.D. thesis (Brisbane, Australia)

== Authored bibliography ==
- Korn, Thomas; Bettelli, Estelle; Oukka, Mohamed; Kuchroo, Vijay K. (2009). "IL-17 and Th17 Cells". Annual Review of Immunology. 27 (1). Annual Reviews: 485–517. doi:10.1146/annurev.immunol.021908.132710. ISSN 0732-0582. PMID 19132915. (VK ORCID 0000-0001-7177-2110 GS h6h5FdoAAAAJ).
