= Susan Quinn =

American writer of non-fiction

Susan Taft Quinn (born 1940) is an American writer of non-fiction books and articles. She is a recipient of the PEN New England Award.

== Life ==
Born in 1940, Susan Quinn grew up in Chillicothe, Ohio, and graduated from Oberlin College.

She began her writing career as a newspaper reporter on a suburban daily outside of Cleveland, Ohio, following two years as an apprentice actor at the Cleveland Play House, a professional repertory company.

In 1967, she published her first book under her married name of Susan Jacobs: a nonfiction account of the making of a Broadway play called On Stage (Alfred A. Knopf). In 1972, after moving to Boston, she became a regular contributor to an alternative Cambridge weekly, The Real Paper, then a contributor and staff writer on Boston Magazine. In 1979, she won the Penney-Missouri magazine award for an investigative article for Boston Magazine on dangerous cargo transported through the city, and the Golden Hammer Award from the National Association of Home Builders for an investigative article on home inspections. She has written articles for many publications, including the New York Times Magazine, the Atlantic Monthly, and Ms Magazine.

Since 1987 Quinn has published three books on scientific and medical subjects and two dealing with artistic, social, and political issues. Her biography of Marie Curie required seven years of study and was helped by a fellowship from the Guggenheim foundation. It was translated into eight languages and was awarded the Grand prix des lectrices de Elle in 1997. Along with other works by Quinn, this biography has been reissued in eBook form by Plunkett Lake Press. She has served as the chair of PEN New England, a branch of the writers’ organization International PEN.

She lives as Susan Quinn Jacobs in Brookline, Massachusetts.

== Awards and honors ==
- 1988 L.L. Winship/PEN New England Award, A Mind of Her Own: The Life of Karen Horney

== Books ==
- A Mind of Her Own; The Life of Karen Horney (Simon and Schuster, Addison-Wesley and Perseus, 1987)
  - published as an eBook by Plunkett Lake Press.
- Marie Curie: A Life (Perseus, 1995)
  - published as an eBook by Plunkett Lake Press
- Human Trials: Scientists, Investors and Patients in the Quest for a Cure (Perseus, 2001)
- Furious Improvisation: How the WPA and a Cast of Thousands Made High Art out of Desperate Times (Walker, 2008)
- Eleanor and Hick: The Love Affair That Shaped a First Lady (Penguin Random House, 2016)
