= Andrew Bredin =

English cricketer

Personal information
- Full name: Andrew Michael Bredin
- Born: 12 January 1962 (age 64); Wimbledon, Surrey, England
- Batting: Right-handed
- Bowling: Slow left-arm orthodox

Domestic team information
- Years: Team
- 1986: Sussex

Career statistics
Competition	First-class
Matches	7
Runs scored	26
Batting average	6.50
100s/50s	–/–
Top score	8*
Balls bowled	690
Wickets	7
Bowling average	55.00
5 wickets in innings	–
10 wickets in match	–
Best bowling	2/50
Catches/stumpings	1/–
- Source: Cricinfo, 26 July 2011

Andrew Michael Bredin (born 12 January 1962) is a former English cricketer. Bredin was a right-handed batsman who bowled slow left-arm orthodox. He was born in Wimbledon, Surrey.

He made his first-class debut for Sussex against Surrey in the 1986 County Championship. He made 6 further first-class appearances, all of which came in the 1986, with his final appearance coming against Northamptonshire. In his 7 first-class matches, he took 7 wickets at an average of 55.00, with a high score of 2/50. With the bat, he scored 26 runs at a batting average of 6.50, with a high score of 8 not out. He made no further appearances for Sussex following the 1986 season.
