= Stéphane Bredin =

French civil servant (born 1976)

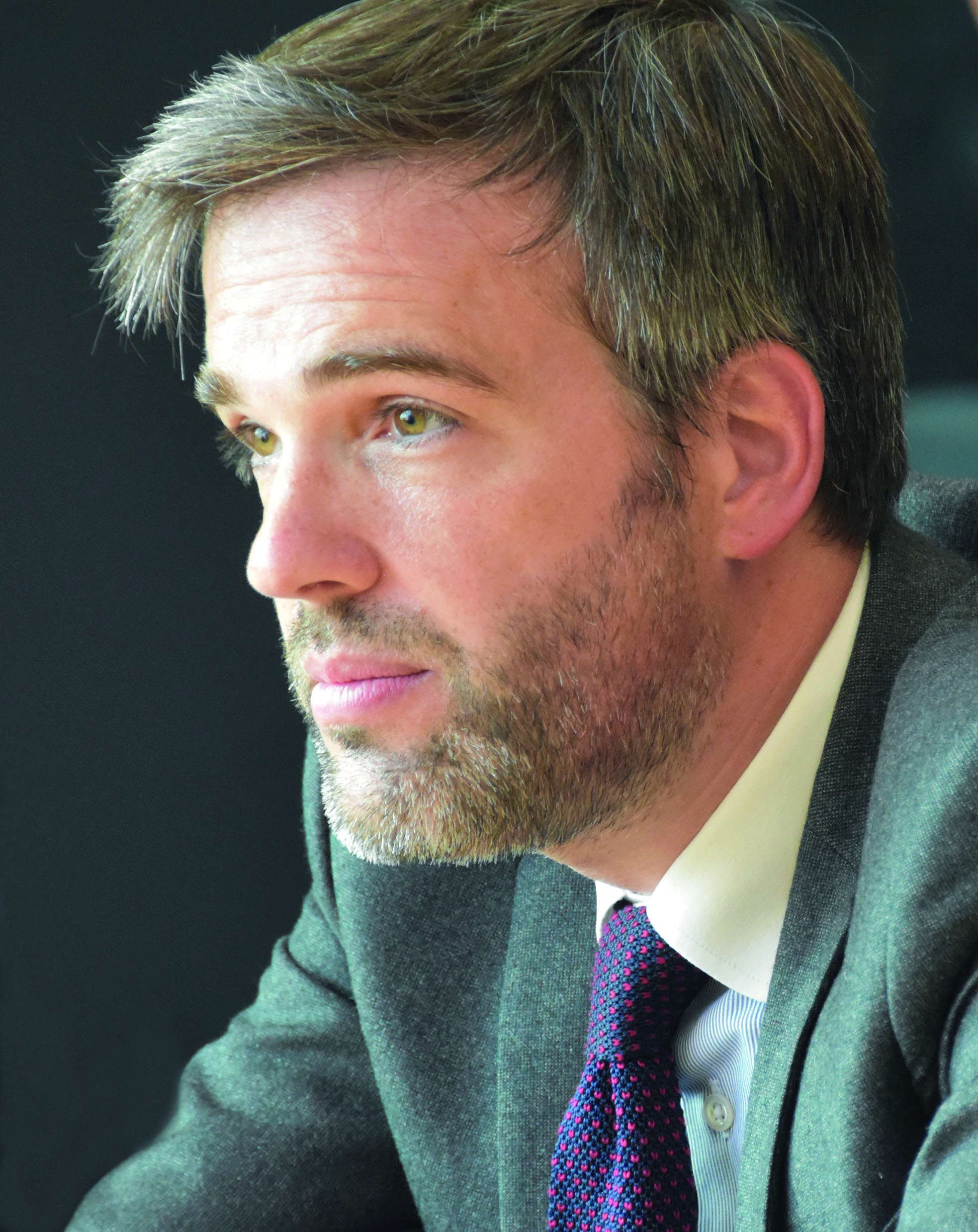
- Bredin in 2022

Director of the Penitentiary Administration
- In office 2 August 2017 – 8 March 2021
- Preceded by: Philippe Galli
- Succeeded by: Laurent Ridel

Personal details
- Born: 4 October 1976 (age 49)

Stéphane Henri Georges Bredin (born 4 October 1976) is a French civil servant who has been serving as prefect of Calvados since 2023. From 2021 to 2023, he served as prefect of Indre. From 2017 to 2021, he served as director of the penitentiary administration.
